= Karachi–Peshawar Line =

Karachi–Peshawar Railway Line کراچی–پشاور مرکزی ریل راستہ
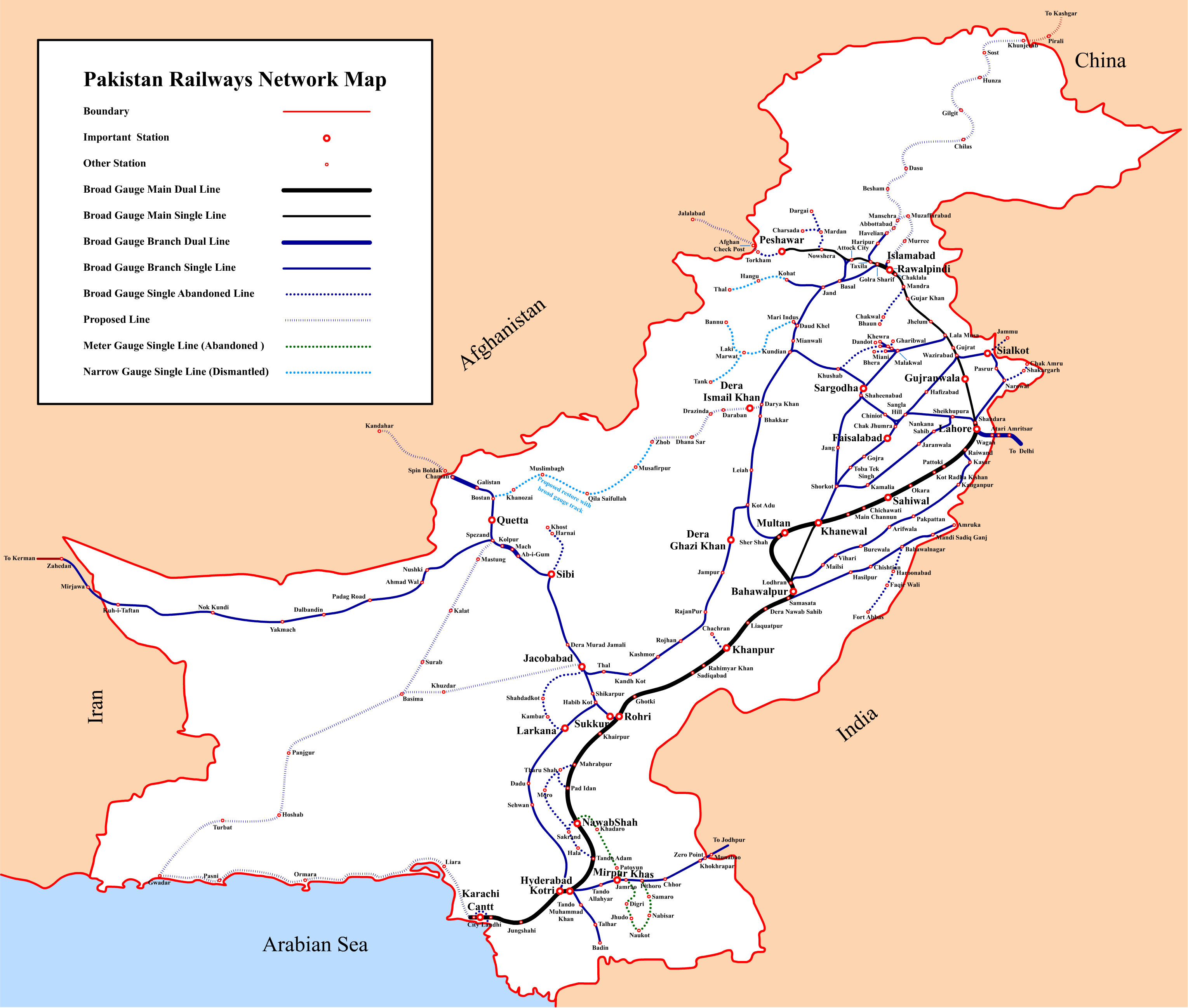
- PR rail network with Main Line 1 highlighted in black

Overview
- Other name(s): Main Line 1 ML-1
- Native name: کراچی–پشاور مرکزی ریل راستہ
- Owner: Pakistan Railways
- Termini: Kiamari; Peshawar Cantonment
- Stations: 173

Service
- Operator: Pakistan Railways

Technical
- Line length: 1,872 km (1,163 mi)
- Track gauge: 1,676 mm (5 ft 6 in)
- Operating speed: (Current) 60 km/h (37 mph) to 115 km/h (71 mph) (Proposed) 140 km/h (87 mph)

Karachi–Peshawar Railway Line (Urdu: کراچی–پشاور مرکزی ریل راستہ, romanized: karāčī-pešāvar markazī rēl rāsta) (also referred to as Main Line 1 or ML-1) is one of four main railway lines in Pakistan that is operated and maintained by Pakistan Railways. The 1,687-kilometer (1,048 mi) long line starts at Kiamari station, Sindh, and ends at Peshawar Cantonment Station in Khyber Pakhtunkhwa. The railway is dual tracked between Keamari and Shahdara Bagh, and Chaklala and Golra Sharif. With 173 railway stations, the line serves as the country's main passenger and freight line, 75% of the country's railroad cargo and passenger traffic passing through yearly.

In 2016, funding for a six-year, US$6.8 billion upgrade and renovation project was agreed as part of the China Pakistan Economic Corridor, with the average speed to be doubled to 140 kilometers per hour upon completion. The project has been delayed several times since then.

== History ==
The present-day Karachi–Peshawar Railway Line was built as a patchwork of different railways during the British Raj during the 19th century. It consists of the following historic sections built between 1861 and 1900:

- Karachi–Kotri section, opened in 1861 (Kotri Bridge over the Indus River, opened in 1899)
- Kotri–Rohri section, opened in 1900
- Rohri–Multan section, opened in 1879 (Empress Bridge (near Bahawalpur) over the Sutlej River, opened in 1878)
- Multan–Lahore section, opened in 1861
- Lahore–Peshawar section, opened in 1876 (Attock Bridge over the Indus River, opened in 1883)

=== Early development ===
The Scinde Railway was constructed in 1861 as a 1,676 mm (5 ft 6 in) broad gauge railway line between Karachi and Kotri. Work on the first line for public use in the region had commenced in April 1858. Following completion, the Indus Steam Flotilla began docking in Kotri instead of Karachi from Multan. The Punjab Railway was constructed and inaugurated in late 1861 as a 1,676 mm (5 ft 6 in) broad gauge railway line between Multan and Lahore, and later extended to Amritsar. The travel time between Sindh and Punjab was greatly reduced together with the Scinde Railway, Indus Steam Flotilla and Punjab Railways; the previous 40 day journey between Karachi and Lahore was reduced to 48 hours.

=== Mergers & expansion ===
In 1870, the Scinde, Punjab & Delhi Railway was with the merger of the Scinde Railway, Indus Steam Flotilla, Punjab Railway and Delhi Railway companies to increase efficiency of passenger and cargo transport between Sindh and Punjab. However, the rail gap between Kotri and Multan was considered a hassle, as the Indus River and Sutlej River were major obstacles to crossings at the time. In 1871, the Indus Valley State Railway was inaugurated and construction began on extending the railway line from Multan south towards Bahawalpur, crossing the Sutlej River and to Rohri. In 1876, the Punjab Northern State Railway was constructed between Lahore and Peshawar and in 1883 the Attock Bridge over the Indus River was opened. In 1878, the Empress Bridge over the Sutlej River was opened and in 1879 the Indus Valley State Railway reached Rohri. From there, a steam ferry would transport eight rail carriages at a time across the Indus between Rohri and Sukkur. This was cumbersome and time-consuming. In 1889, the Lansdowne Bridge between Rohri and Sukkar was opened and in 1893 work on the Kotri Bridge commenced. It was only in 1900 that the section between Rohri and Kotri was completed. In 1885, all the companies were merged to form the North Western State Railway.

== ML-1 upgrade ==
In 2015, China and Pakistan signed an agreement to perform a joint feasibility study of modernizing ML-1, funded by Chinese loans, as part of the China–Pakistan Economic Corridor. The plan involved doubling the track from Karachi to Peshawar, providing grade separation, as well as communications-based train control. The new infrastructure would allow for 134 trains per day, up from the current capacity of 34 trains per day.

The first phase was expected to cost US$3.65 billion. In June 2016, China and Pakistan unveiled plans for the second phase of the project, with a total cost of US$8.2 billion at the time for both phases of the project.

The first phase was initially expected to be completed by December 2017, with the second phase expected to be completed in 2021. The project has since been delayed repeatedly.

Upgrading the railway line is expected to permit train travel at speeds of 160 kilometers per hour, versus the average 60 to 105 km per hour speed currently possible on existing track, and is expected to increase Pakistan Railways' annual revenues by approximately US$480 million. The upgrades are also expected to cut transit times from Karachi to Peshawar by half. Pakistani railways currently account for 4% of freight traffic in the country, and upon completion of CPEC, Pakistani railways are expected to transport 20% of the country's freight traffic by 2025.

=== Upgrade plan ===
At the time of CPEC's announcement, the ML-1 was dual track between Karachi and the Lahore suburb of Shahdara, and between Golra Sharif and Chaklala, with long stretches of single track elsewhere. Construction works to upgrade to dual track between Lodhran to Shahdara were completed in January 2016. As part of the first phase of the CPEC railway project, the remaining stretch of track between Shahdara and Peshawar is to be upgraded to dual track.

The first part of the project will focus on upgrading the Multan to Peshawar section, which will then be followed by the Hyderabad to Multan section, and finally by the Hyderabad to Karachi section.

The 676-kilometer portion between Lalamusa, north of Lahore, and Peshawar will require complete reconstruction, with the addition of tunnels, culverts, and bridges, while over 900 kilometers south of Lalamusa towards Karachi will be upgraded to handle cars with a 25-ton axle load capacity. A spur from Taxila to Havelian will also be constructed, with a dry port to be established near the city of Havelian. The entire length of track will be upgraded to computerized signal systems, with stretches of track in urban areas fenced off to prevent pedestrians and vehicles from crossing tracks in unauthorized areas.

=== Upgrade timeline ===
In January 2022, it appeared that there was no funding plan in place and China was reluctant to provide capital. From 2022 through 2024, Pakistan and China negotiated over the exact size of the loan and the scope of the first phase of the ML-1 project, despite an agreement from both countries in 2023 to fast-track its implementation. The negotiations have delayed the first phase of the project; in 2024, the Pakistani government unveiled a plan with reduced total cost of US$6.7 billion, but the Chinese government instead seemed more supportive of financing smaller, more-manageable segments, e.g., only the Karachi to Hyderabad section as a first step for a sum of US$1.1 billion. The reduced total plan required significant compromises on the design and scope and was deemed “unviable” by the Planning Commission.

Some economists, including ex-Finance Minister Miftah Ismail, argued at the time that the loans are a poor choice economically, especially with the state being under financial strain. However, this has been countered with the assertion that the upgrades are necessary, risking the railway system not functioning otherwise, and the expansion will provide unique advantages in regional trade and economic strategy.

In October 2024, China and Pakistan agreed to split the project into two phases: one from Karachi to Hyderabad and Hyderabad to Multan, and another from Multan to Peshawar.

In December 2025, Pakistan finalized an agreement for financing the first phase of the project with Asian Development Bank.

In July 2026, the planning minister announced the ground-breaking for the upgrades would happen on or after January 2027.

== Stations ==
The stations on this line are as follows:

- Karachi City
- D.C.O.S. Halt (Abandoned)
- Karachi Cantonment
- Chanesar Halt (Abandoned)
- Departure Yard
- Karsaz Halt (Abandoned)
- P. A.F. Halt (Abandoned)
- Drigh Road Junction
- Drigh Colony Junction Halt
- Airport Halt
- Malir Colony Halt
- Malir
- Landhi
- Jummah Goth
- Bin Qasim
- Badal Nala
- Gaddar
- Dabheji
- Gharo (Abandoned)
- Ran Pethani
- Loqia Halt (Abandoned)
- Jungshahi
- Sahdero (Abandoned)
- Braudabad
- Utram (Abandoned)
- Jhimpir
- Latif Chang (Abandoned)
- Meting
- Ongar (Abandoned)
- Bholari
- Kotri Junction
- Giddu Halt (Abandoned)
- Hyderabad Junction
- Detha
- Rahuki (Abandoned)
- Khatian Road (Abandoned)
- Allahdino Sand
- Palijani
- Wahab Shah
- Oderolal
- Tando Adam Junction
- Jalal Marri
- Shahdadpur
- Lundo
- Sarhari
- Nawaz Dahri (Abandoned)
- Nawabshah Junction
- Bucheri
- Daur
- Balochpur (Abandoned)
- Bandhi
- Mirjat (Abandoned)
- Kot Lalloo
- Padidan
- Bhiria Road
- Ghulamabad (Abandoned)
- Lakha Road
- Sialabad (Abandoned)
- Mahrabpur Junction
- Deparja (Abandoned)
- Setharja
- Ranipur Riyasat
- Gambat
- Pir Katpar (Abandoned)
- Tando Musti Khan
- Sahu (Abandoned)
- Khairpur
- Raina (Abandoned)
- Begmanji
- South Block Hut
- Rohri Junction
- Mando Dairo
- Sangi
- Hingoro Road Halt (Abandoned)
- Pano Akil
- Mahesar
- Ali Nawaz Ghoto Halt (Abandoned)
- Ghotki
- Sarhad
- Mirpur Mathelo
- Daharki
- Kobar (Abandoned)
- Reti
- Dhandi (Abandoned)
- Chak Asmat Ullah Halt (Abandoned)
- Shaheed Haider Ali
- Machi Goth
- Sadikabad
- Chandrami (Abandoned)
- Adam Sahaba
- Rahim Yar Khan
- Tarinda
- Dari Azim Khan Halt (Abandoned)
- Kot Samaba
- Sahja
- Khanpur Junction
- Jhetha Bhutta
- Feroza
- Metla (Abandoned)
- Liaquatpur
- Tanwari (Abandoned)
- Chani Goth
- Kulab (Abandoned)
- Dera Nawab Sahib
- Tibbi Izzat (Abandoned)
- Mubarakpur
- Kalanchwala
- Samasata Junction
- Bahawalpur
- Adamwahan Bridge (Abandoned)
- Adam Wahan
- Lodhran Junction
- Shah Nal (Abandoned)
- Mujahidabad (Abandoned)
- Gilawala
- Noori Lal Halt (Abandoned)
- Zarif Shaheed
- Basti Dad (Abandoned)
- Shujabad
- Chak (Abandoned)
- Buch (Abandoned)
- Pir Mukhtar Wala Halt (Abandoned)
- Sher Shah Junction
- Muzaffarabad (Abandoned)
- Multan Cantonment
- Multan City (Abandoned)
- Mumtazabad Halt (Abandoned)
- New Multan (Abandoned)
- Piran Ghaib
- Tatipur (Abandoned)
- Riazabad
- Kot Abbas Shaheed (Abandoned)
- Shamkote (Abandoned)
- Khanewal Junction
- Dera Taj
- Pirawala (Abandoned)
- Rajput Nagar
- Kacha Khuh (Abandoned)
- Waris Ali Shahaeed (Abandoned)
- Mohsinwal (Abandoned)
- Musa Virk (Abandoned)
- Mian Channun
- Sadiq Ali Shaheed (Abandoned)
- Iqbal Nagar (Abandoned)
- Kassowal
- Kotla Adib Shaheed (Abandoned)
- Chichawatni
- Dad Fatihana (Abandoned)
- Masud Akhtar Shahid (Abandoned)
- Harappa
- Mirdad Muafi (Abandoned)
- Sahiwal
- Nur Muhammad Mokal (Abandoned)
- Yusafwala
- Qadirabad (Abandoned)
- Okara Cantonment
- Tabruk (Abandoned)
- Okara
- Hazarat Karanwala (Abandoned)
- Kissan
- Renala Khurd
- Akhtarabad (Abandoned)
- Habibabad
- Sehjowal (Abandoned)
- Pattoki
- Wan Adhan (Abandoned)
- Changa Manga
- Bhoe Asal (Abandoned)
- Kot Radha Kishn
- Prem Nagar
- Raiwind Junction
- Karyal Halt (Abandoned)
- Jia Bagga
- Halloki Halt (Abandoned)
- Kana Kacha (Abandoned)
- Green Town Halt (Abandoned)
- Kot Lakhpat
- Walton
- Lahore Cantonment
- Lahore Junction
- Badami Bagh
- Shahdara Bagh Junction
- Koh-I-Noor (Abandoned)
- Kala Shah Kaku
- Muridke
- Sadhoke
- Kamoke
- Eminabad
- Theri Sansi (Abandoned)
- Gujranwala City (Abandoned)
- Gujranwala
- Gujranwala Cantonment
- Ghakkhar Mandi
- Dhaunkal
- Nizamabad (Abandoned)
- Wazirabad Junction
- Haripur Band
- Kathala (Abandoned)
- Gujrat
- Deona Juliani
- Lala Musa Junction
- Chak Pirana
- Kharian Cantonment
- Kharian City
- Banni Bangla (Abandoned)
- Choa Kariala
- Sarai Alamgir
- Jhelum
- Kala Gujran
- Kaluwal
- Dina
- Ratial (Abandoned)
- Domeli
- Bakrala
- Tarki
- Sohawa
- Tandoi (Abandoned)
- Pindora (Abandoned)
- Missa Keswal
- Gujar Khan
- Ghungrila
- Mandra
- Kaliam Awan
- Mankiala
- Mughal (Abandoned)
- Sihala
- Lohi Behr (Abandoned)
- Chaklala
- Rawalpindi
- Nur Junction
- Madina-Tul-Hijjaj
- Golra Sharif Junction
- Sangjani
- Taxila Cantonment Junction
- Wah Cantonment
- Budho
- Wah
- Hasan Abdal
- Burhan
- Faqeerabad
- Sanjwal
- Sanjwal Cantonment (Abandoned)
- Attock City Junction
- Rumian
- Attock Khurd
- Khairabad Kund
- Jhangira Road
- Akora Khattak
- Hayat Sher Pao Shaheed (Abandoned)
- Nowshera Junction
- Khushhal Kot
- Pir Piai
- Pabbi
- Taru Jabba
- Nasarpur
- Peshawar City
- Peshawar Cantonment
