= Awam Express =

Pakistani express train

Overview
- Service type: Inter-city rail
- First service: 1925
- Last service: Present
- Current operator: Pakistan Railways

Route
- Termini: Karachi Cantonment; Peshawar Cantonment
- Stops: 62
- Distance travelled: 1,732 kilometres (1,076 mi)
- Average journey time: 33 hours, 30 minutes
- Service frequency: Daily
- Train numbers: 13UP (Karachi→Peshawar); 14DN (Peshawar→Karachi)

On-board services
- Classes: Economy Class; AC Standard; AC Business
- Sleeping arrangements: Available
- Catering facilities: Available

Technical
- Track gauge: 1,676 mm (5 ft 6 in)
- Track owner: Pakistan Railways
Route map
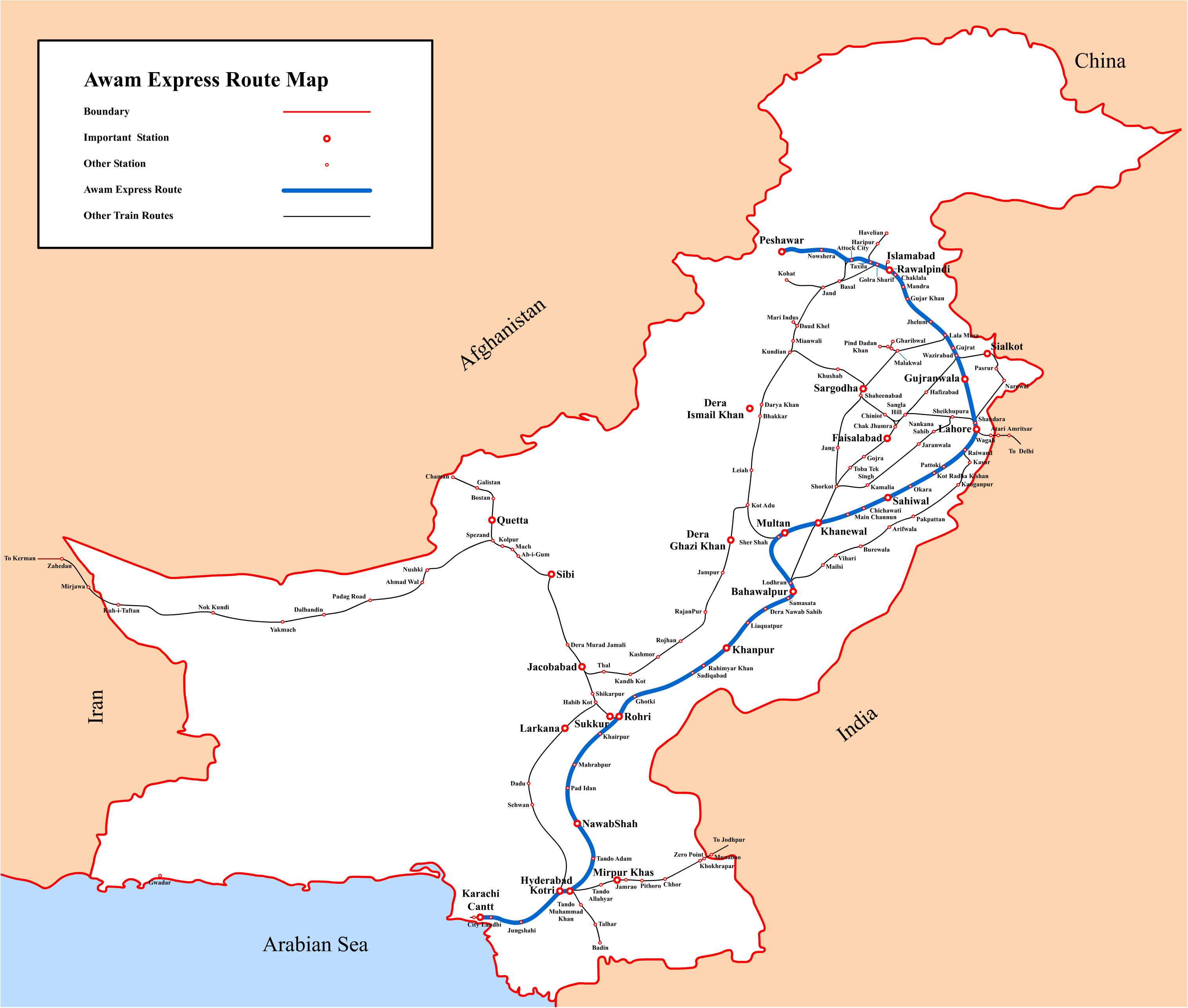

Awam Express (Urdu: عوام ایکسپریس) is a passenger train operated daily by Pakistan Railways between Karachi and Peshawar. The trip took approximately 33 hours and 30 minutes to cover a published distance of 1,732 kilometres (1,076 mi), traveling along the entire stretch of the Karachi–Peshawar Railway Line.

== Route ==
- Karachi Cantonment–Peshawar Cantonment via Karachi–Peshawar Railway Line

== Station stops ==
- Karachi Cantonment
- Landhi
- Jungshahi
- Jhimpir
- Kotri Junction
- Hyderabad Junction
- Tando Adam Junction
- Shadadpur
- Nawabshah
- Lot Lalloo
- Pad Idan
- Bhiria Road
- Mehrabpur Junction
- Setharja
- Ranipur Riyasat
- Gambat
- Khairpur
- Rohri Junction
- Pano Akil
- Ghotki
- Mirpur Mathelo
- Daharki
- Sadiqabad
- Rahim Yar Khan
- Khanpur
- Liaqatpur
- Dera Nawab Sahib
- Samasata Junction
- Bahawalpur
- Shujabad
- Multan Cantonment
- Khanewal Junction
- Chichawatni
- Sahiwal
- Okara Cantonment
- Pattoki
- Kot Radha Kishan
- Raiwand Junction
- Kot Lakhpat
- Lahore Junction
- Gujranwala
- Wazirabad Junction
- Gujrat
- Lala Musa Junction
- Kharian Cantonment
- Jhelum
- Dina
- Gujar Khan
- Chaklala
- Rawalpindi
- Golra (Islamabad)
- Taxila Junction
- Hasan Abdal
- Attock City Junction
- Jahangira Road
- Nowshera Junction
- Peshawar City
- Peshawar Cantonment

== Equipment ==
The train has Economy Class, AC Standard and AC Business accommodations.

== Incidents ==
- 15 September 2016: Awam Express collided with a freight train near Multan, killing at least six people and injuring more than 150.

== Cease of operation ==
Pakistan Railways suspended the operation of five trains during the 2022 flood. PR couldn't resume its operation after suspending during the 2022 flood. Finally, on 20 December 2023 awam express was restored.
