= Lalamusa Goods railway station =

Railway station in Punjab, Pakistan

Lalamusa Goods Railway Station لالا موسیٰ گڈز ریلوے اسٹیشن

General information
- Owner: Ministry of Railways
- Line: Karachi–Peshawar Railway Line

Other information
- Station code: LLMG

Services
Preceding station	Pakistan Railways	Following station
Lala Musa Junction towards Kiamari	Karachi–Peshawar Line	Chak Pirana towards Peshawar Cantonment

Lalamusa Goods Railway Station (Urdu and Punjabi: لالا موسیٰ گڈز ریلوے اسٹیشن) is located in Lala Musa city, Gujrat district of Punjab province, Pakistan. The station is located on the Karachi–Peshawar Line of Pakistan Railways.

== See also ==
- List of railway stations in Pakistan
- Pakistan Railways
