= Burhan railway station =

Railway station in Pakistan

Burhan Railway Station برہان ریلوے اسٹیشن

General information
- Coordinates: 33.8215°N 72.5879°E
- Owner: Ministry of Railways
- Line: Karachi–Peshawar Railway Line

Other information
- Station code: BUN

History
- Opened: 1879

Services
Preceding station	Pakistan Railways	Following station
Hasan Abdal towards Kiamari	Karachi–Peshawar Line	Faqirabad towards Peshawar Cantonment
Location

Burhan Railway Station (Urdu and Punjabi: برہان ریلوے اسٹیشن) is located in the town of Burhan, Attock district, Punjab province, Pakistan.

== See also ==
- List of railway stations in Pakistan
- Pakistan Railways
