= Pir Katpar railway station =

Railway station in Pakistan

Pir Katpar Railway Station پیر کاٹپر ریلوے اسٹیشن پير ڪٽبر ريلوي اسٽيشن

General information
- Owner: Ministry of Railways
- Line: Karachi–Peshawar Railway Line

Other information
- Station code: POP

Services
Preceding station	Pakistan Railways	Following station
Gambat towards Kiamari	Karachi–Peshawar Line	Tando Mustikhan towards Peshawar Cantonment
Location

Pir Katpar Railway Station (Urdu: پیر کاٹپر ریلوے اسٹیشن, Sindhi: پیر ڪٽبر ریلوي اسٽیشن) is located in Pir Katpar village, Khairpur District of Sindh province of the Pakistan.

== See also ==
- List of railway stations in Pakistan
- Pakistan Railways
