= Bandhi railway station =

Railway station in Pakistan

Bandhi Railway Station باندھی ریلوے اسٹیشن ٻانڏي ريلوي اسٽيشن
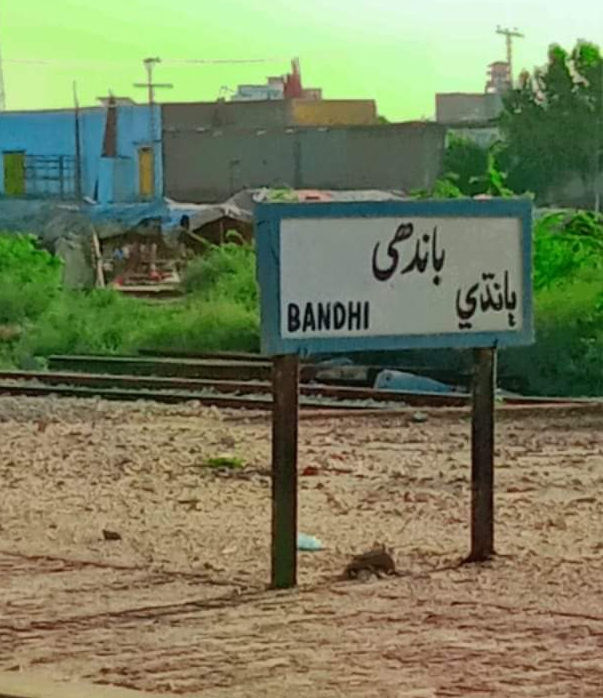

General information
- Coordinates: 26.5866°N 68.3015°E
- Owner: Ministry of Railways
- Line: Karachi–Peshawar Railway Line

Other information
- Station code: BHE

Services
Preceding station	Pakistan Railways	Following station
Daur towards Kiamari	Karachi–Peshawar Line	Kot Lalloo towards Peshawar Cantonment
Location
- Location within Pakistan Location within Sindh

Bandhi Railway Station (Urdu: باندھی ریلوے اسٹیشن, Sindhi: ٻانڌي ريلوي اسٽيشن) is a railway station located in town of Bandhi, in Shaheed Benazir Abad district, Sindh, Pakistan. It is located around 55 km from Nawabshah.

== See also ==
- List of railway stations in Pakistan
- Pakistan Railways
