= Ratial railway station =

Railway station in Punjab, Pakistan

Ratial Railway Station رتیال ریلوے اسٹیشن
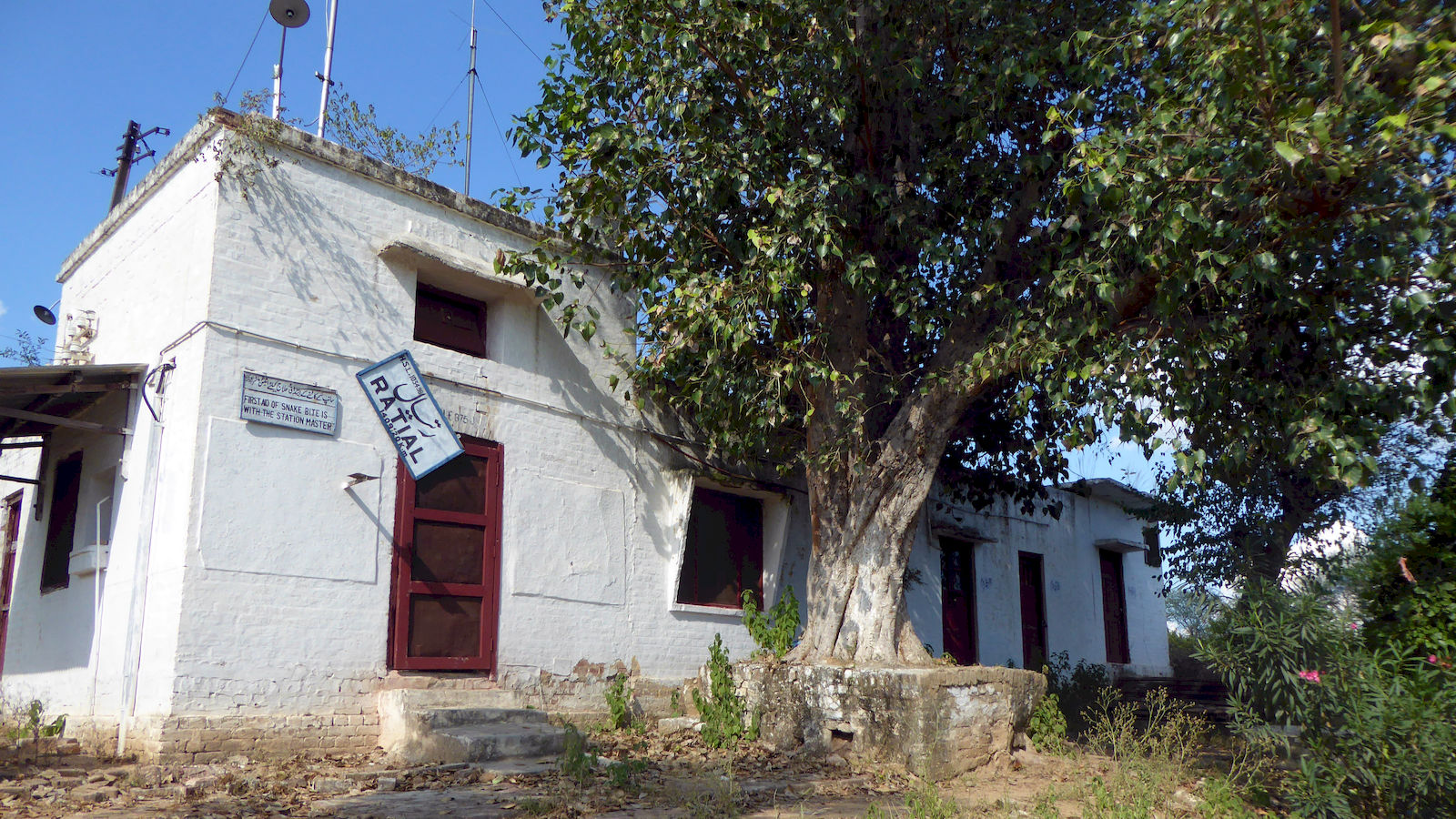

General information
- Coordinates: 33.0328°N 73.5360°E
- Owner: Ministry of Railways
- Line: Karachi–Peshawar Railway Line

Other information
- Station code: RTL

Services
Preceding station	Pakistan Railways	Following station
Dina towards Kiamari	Karachi–Peshawar Line	Domeli towards Peshawar Cantonment
Location

Ratial Railway Station (Urdu and Punjabi: رتیال ریلوے اسٹیشن) is an abandoned railway station located in Ratial village, Jhelum district of Punjab province of the Pakistan. The station was made abandoned by Pakistan Railways in 2022.

== See also ==
- List of railway stations in Pakistan
- Pakistan Railways

== Gallery ==
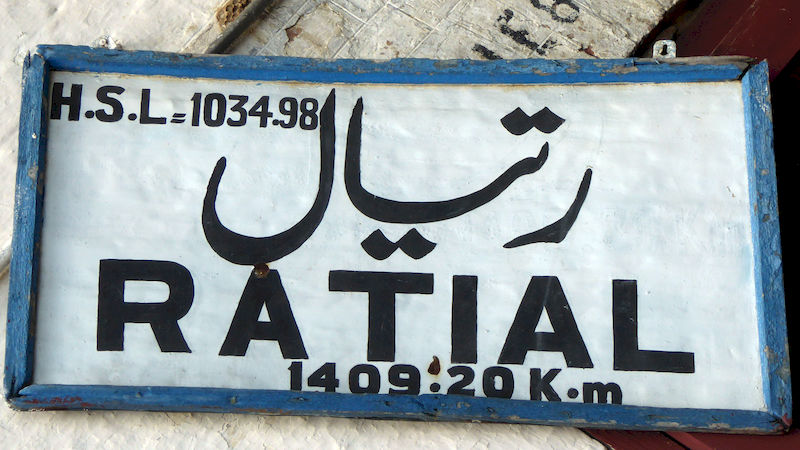
Ratial railway station tag

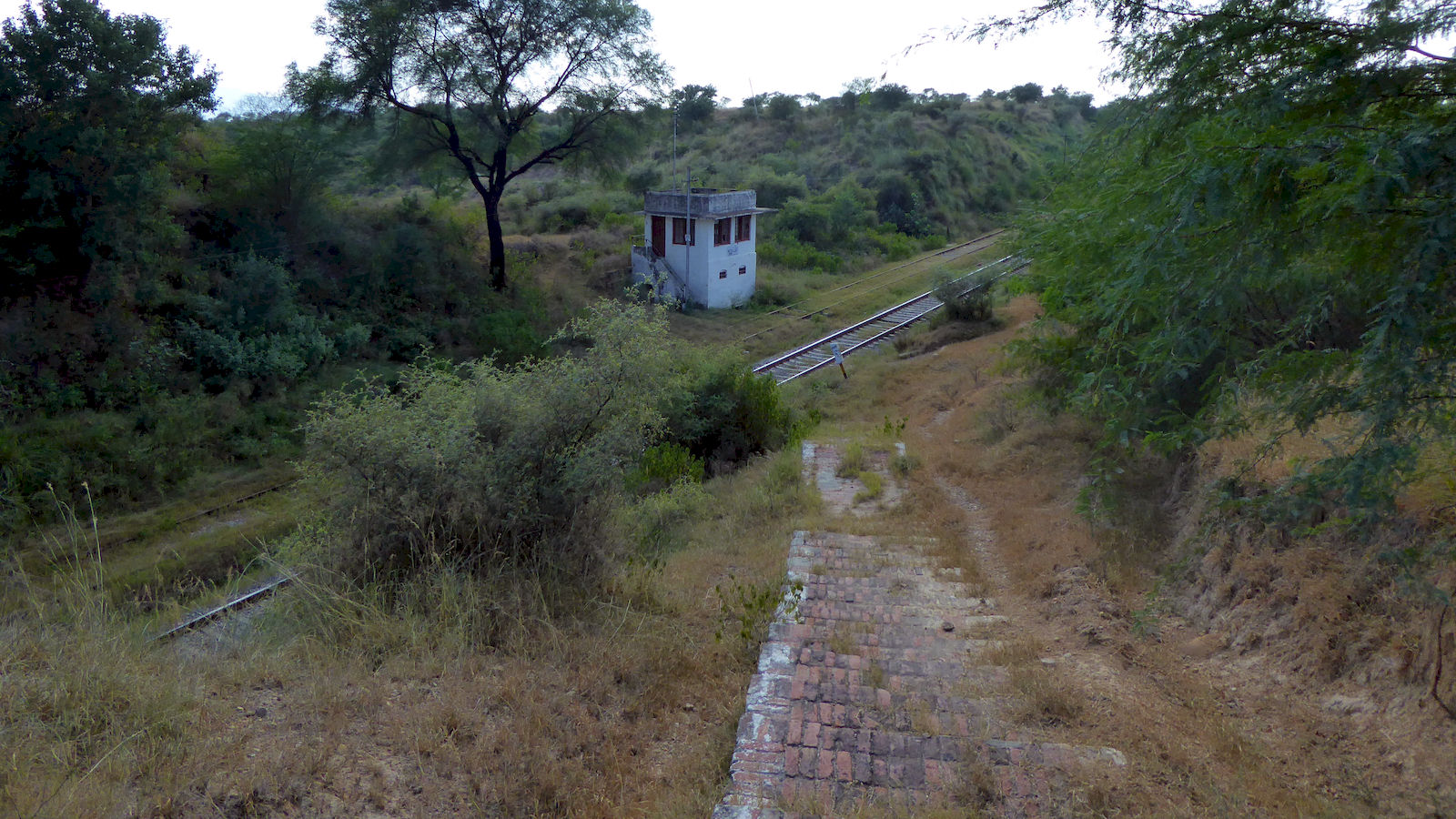
Ratial railway station stairs to the track
