= Dad Fatihana railway station =

Railway station in Punjab, Pakistan

Coordinates: 30.5666°N 72.7833°E

Dad Fatihana Station داد فاتیہانا ریلوے اسٹیشن

General information
- Owner: Ministry of Railways
- Line: Karachi–Peshawar Railway Line

Other information
- Station code: DDH
Location
- Location within Punjab, Pakistan Location within Pakistan

Dad Fatihana railway station (Urdu: داد فاتیہانا ریلوے اسٹیشن) is a disused railway station on the Karachi–Peshawar Railway Line located in Dad Fatihana village, Punjab, Pakistan. The station is located east of Chichawatni railway station and west of Harappa railway station.

== See also ==
- List of railway stations in Pakistan
- Pakistan Railways
