= Renala Khurd railway station =

Railway station in Punjab, Pakistan

Renala Khurd Railway Station رینالہ خورد ریلوے اسٹیشن

General information
- Coordinates: 30.8814°N 73.5992°E
- Owner: Ministry of Railways
- Line: Karachi–Peshawar Railway Line

Other information
- Station code: RKQ

Services
Preceding station	Pakistan Railways	Following station
Kissan towards Kiamari	Karachi–Peshawar Line	Akhtarabad towards Peshawar Cantonment
Location

Renala Khurd Railway Station (Urdu and Punjabi: رینالہ خورد ریلوے اسٹیشن) is located in Renala Khurd subdivision, Okara district of Punjab province of the Pakistan.

== History ==
Renala Khurd railway station was constructed in 1969. The old station building is now not in use. When CBI signals were installed in 2016, the new station building was built.

== See also ==
- List of railway stations in Pakistan
- Pakistan Railways
