= Kalowal railway station =

Railway station in Punjab, Pakistan

Kaluwal Railway Station کالو وال ریلوے اسٹیشن

General information
- Coordinates: 33.0241°N 73.6586°E
- Owner: Ministry of Railways
- Line: Karachi–Peshawar Railway Line

Other information
- Station code: KOW

Services
Preceding station	Pakistan Railways	Following station
Kala Gujran towards Kiamari	Karachi–Peshawar Line	Dina towards Peshawar Cantonment
Location

Kalowal Railway Station (Urdu and Punjabi: کالو وال ریلوے اسٹیشن) is an abandoned railway station located in Kalowal village, Jhelum district of Punjab province of the Pakistan.

== See also ==
- List of railway stations in Pakistan
- Pakistan Railways
