= Qadirabad railway station =

Railway station in Pakistan

Coordinates: 30.715833°N 73.266389°E

Qadirabad Railway Station قادر آباد ریلوے اسٹیشن

General information
- Owner: Ministry of Railways
- Line: Karachi–Peshawar Railway Line

Other information
- Status: Closed
- Station code: QDB
Location

Qadirabad Railway Station (Urdu: قادرآباد ریلوے اسٹیشن) is an abandoned railway station on the Karachi–Peshawar Railway Line located in Punjab, Pakistan. The station is located east of Yusafwala railway station and west of Okara Cantonment railway station.

== See also ==
- List of railway stations in Pakistan
- Pakistan Railways
