= Kissan railway station =

Railway station in Punjab, Pakistan

Kissan Railway Station کسان ریلوے اسٹیشن

General information
- Coordinates: 30.8443°N 73.5236°E
- Owner: Ministry of Railways
- Line: Karachi–Peshawar Railway Line

Other information
- Station code: KFS

Services
Preceding station	Pakistan Railways	Following station
Okara towards Kiamari	Karachi–Peshawar Line	Renala Khurd towards Peshawar Cantonment
Location

Kissan Railway Station (Urdu and Punjabi: کسان ریلوے اسٹیشن)is located in Kissan village, Okara district of Punjab province, Pakistan.

== See also ==
- List of railway stations in Pakistan
- Pakistan Railways
