= Akhtarabad railway station =

Railway station in Pakistan

Akhtarabad Railway Station اخترآباد ریلوے اسٹیشن

General information
- Coordinates: 30.920835°N 73.680093°E
- Owner: Ministry of Railways
- Line: Karachi–Peshawar Railway Line

Other information
- Station code: AKHB

Services
Preceding station	Pakistan Railways	Following station
Renala Khurd towards Kiamari	Karachi–Peshawar Line	Habibabad towards Peshawar Cantonment
Location

Akhtarabad Railway Station (Urdu: اخترآباد ریلوے اسٹیشن) is located in Pakistan.

== See also ==
- List of railway stations in Pakistan
- Pakistan Railways
