= Chak Pirana railway station =

Railway station in Punjab, Pakistan

Chak Pirana Railway Station چک پیرانا ریلوے اسٹیشن

General information
- Coordinates: 32.7511°N 73.9072°E
- Owner: Ministry of Railways
- Line: Karachi–Peshawar Railway Line

Other information
- Station code: CPI

Services
Preceding station	Pakistan Railways	Following station
Lalamusa Goods towards Kiamari	Karachi–Peshawar Line	Kharian Cantonment towards Peshawar Cantonment
Location

Chak Pirana Railway Station (Urdu and Punjabi: چک پیرانا ریلوے اسٹیشن) is an abandoned railway station located in Chak Pirana village in Gujrat district of Punjab province, Pakistan.

== See also ==
- List of railway stations in Pakistan
- Pakistan Railways
