= Habibabad railway station =

Railway station in Punjab, Pakistan

Habibabad Railway Station حبیب آباد ریلوے اسٹیشن

General information
- Coordinates: 30.9544°N 73.7444°E
- Owner: Ministry of Railways
- Line: Karachi–Peshawar Railway Line

Other information
- Station code: HBAD

Services
Preceding station	Pakistan Railways	Following station
Akhtarabad towards Kiamari	Karachi–Peshawar Line	Sehjowal towards Peshawar Cantonment
Location

Habibabad Railway Station (Urdu and Punjabi: حبیب آباد ریلوے اسٹیشن) is located in Habibabad town, Kasur district of Punjab province, Pakistan.

== See also ==
- List of railway stations in Pakistan
- Pakistan Railways
