= Okara railway station =

Pakistani railway station

Okara Railway Station اوکاڑہ ریلوے اسٹیشن
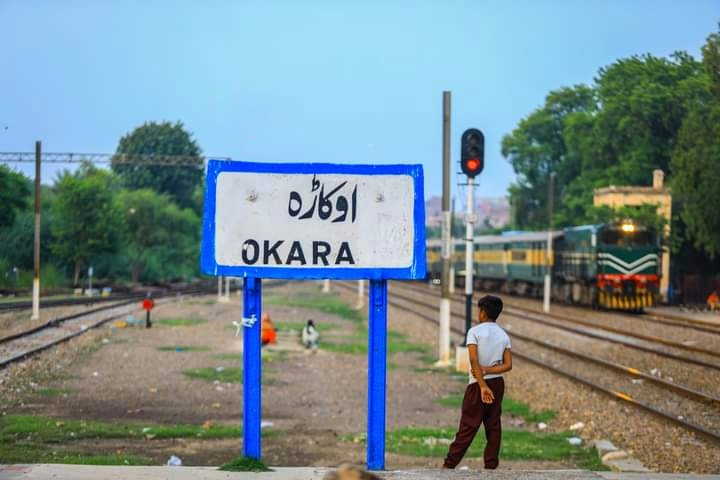
- Okara railway station

General information
- Coordinates: 30.8054°N 73.4443°E
- Owner: Ministry of Railways
- Line: Karachi–Peshawar Railway Line
- Platforms: 3
- Tracks: 5

Construction
- Parking: yes

Other information
- Station code: OKR

History
- Opened: 1927

Services
Preceding station	Pakistan Railways	Following station
Okara Cantonment towards Kiamari	Karachi–Peshawar Line	Kissan towards Peshawar Cantonment
Location

Okara Railway Station (Urdu and Punjabi: اوکاڑہ ریلوے اسٹیشن) is located in Okara, of Punjab province, Pakistan.

== History ==
The railway station was built in 1927 during British India era.

In May 2025, Okara station was reported to be among 14 of Pakistan Railways' Lahore Division stations being converted to solar energy.

== Gallery ==
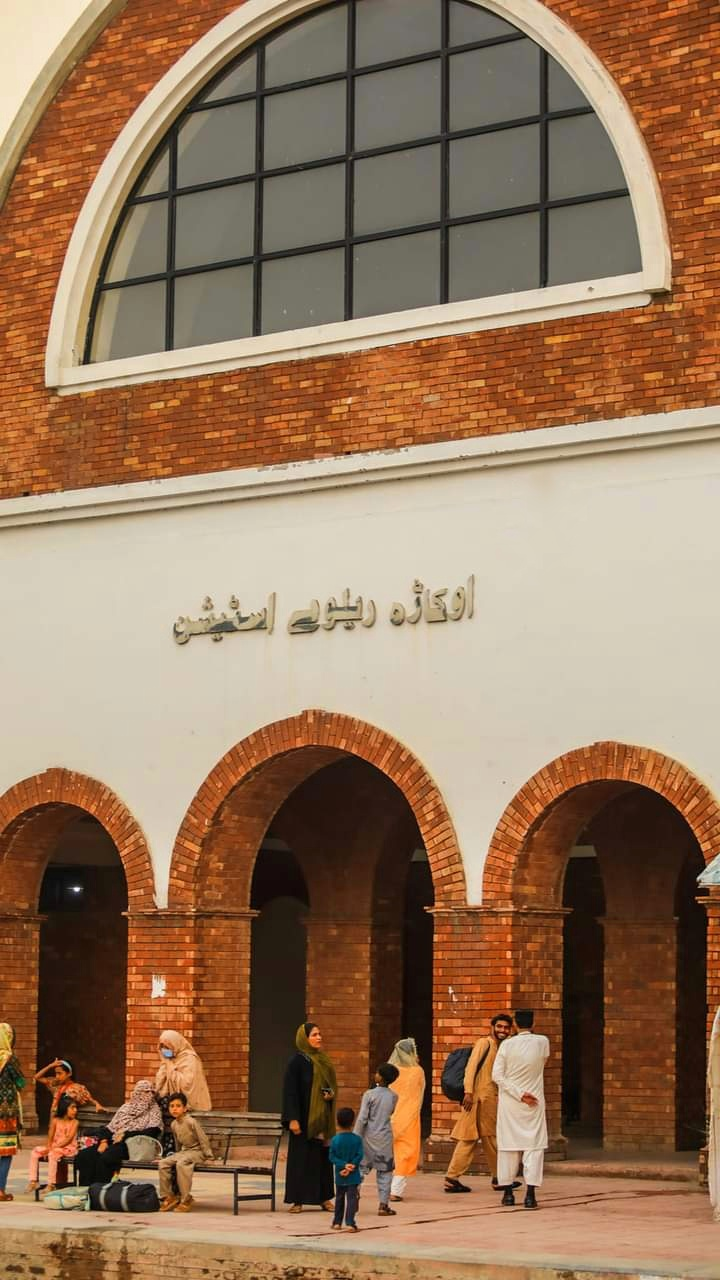

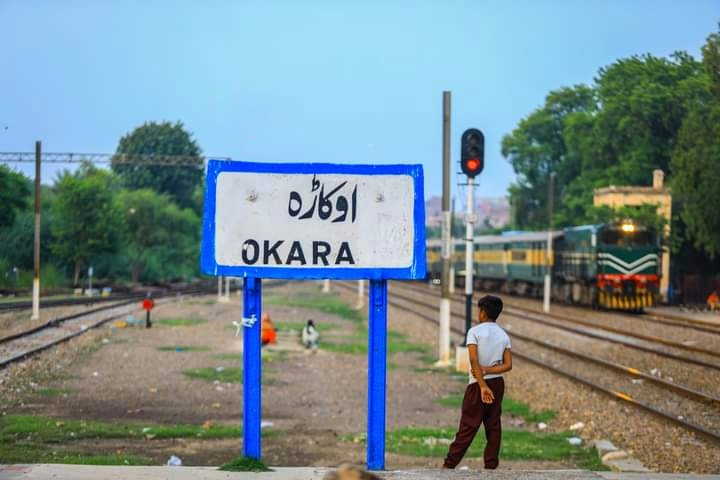

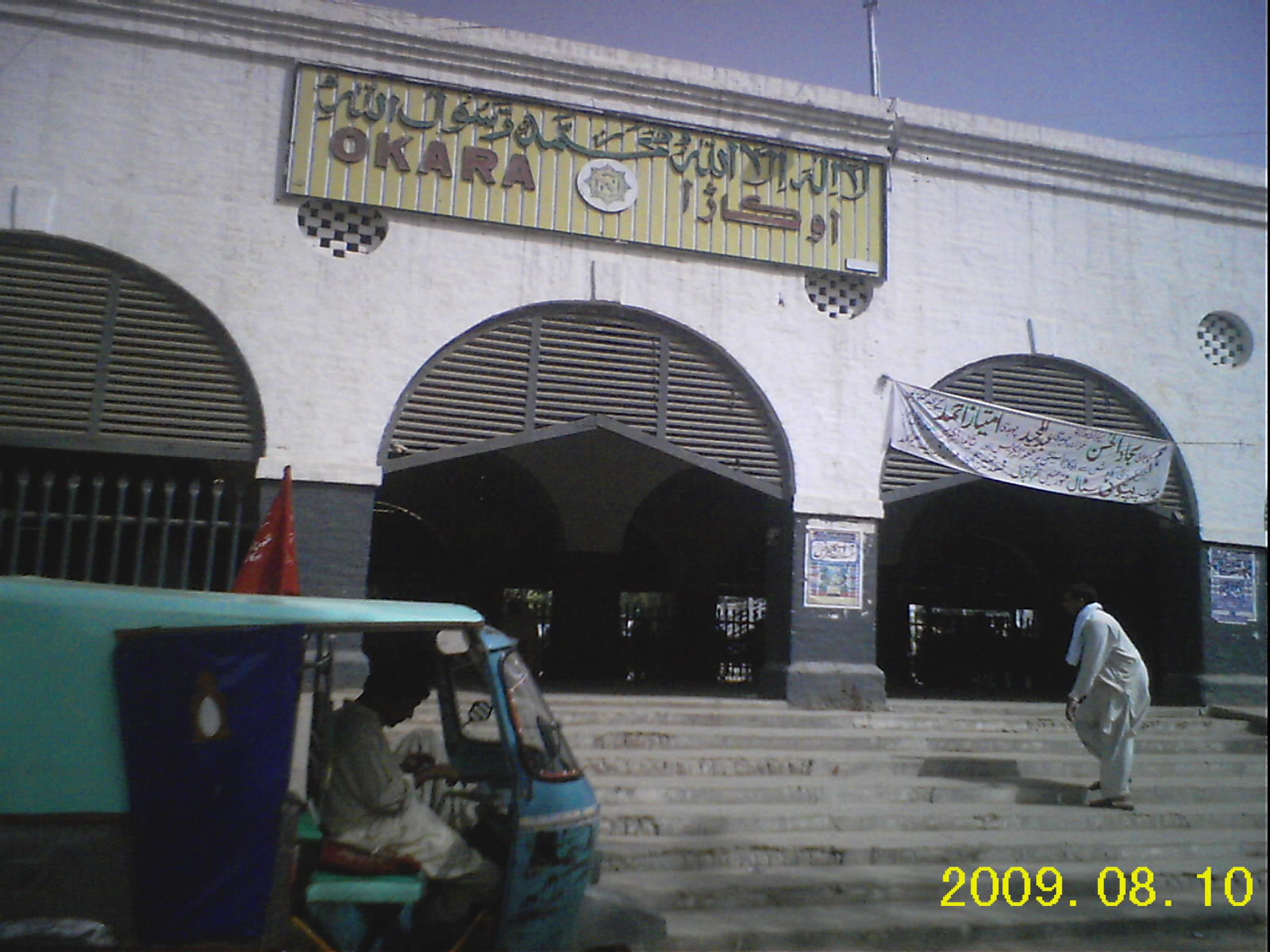

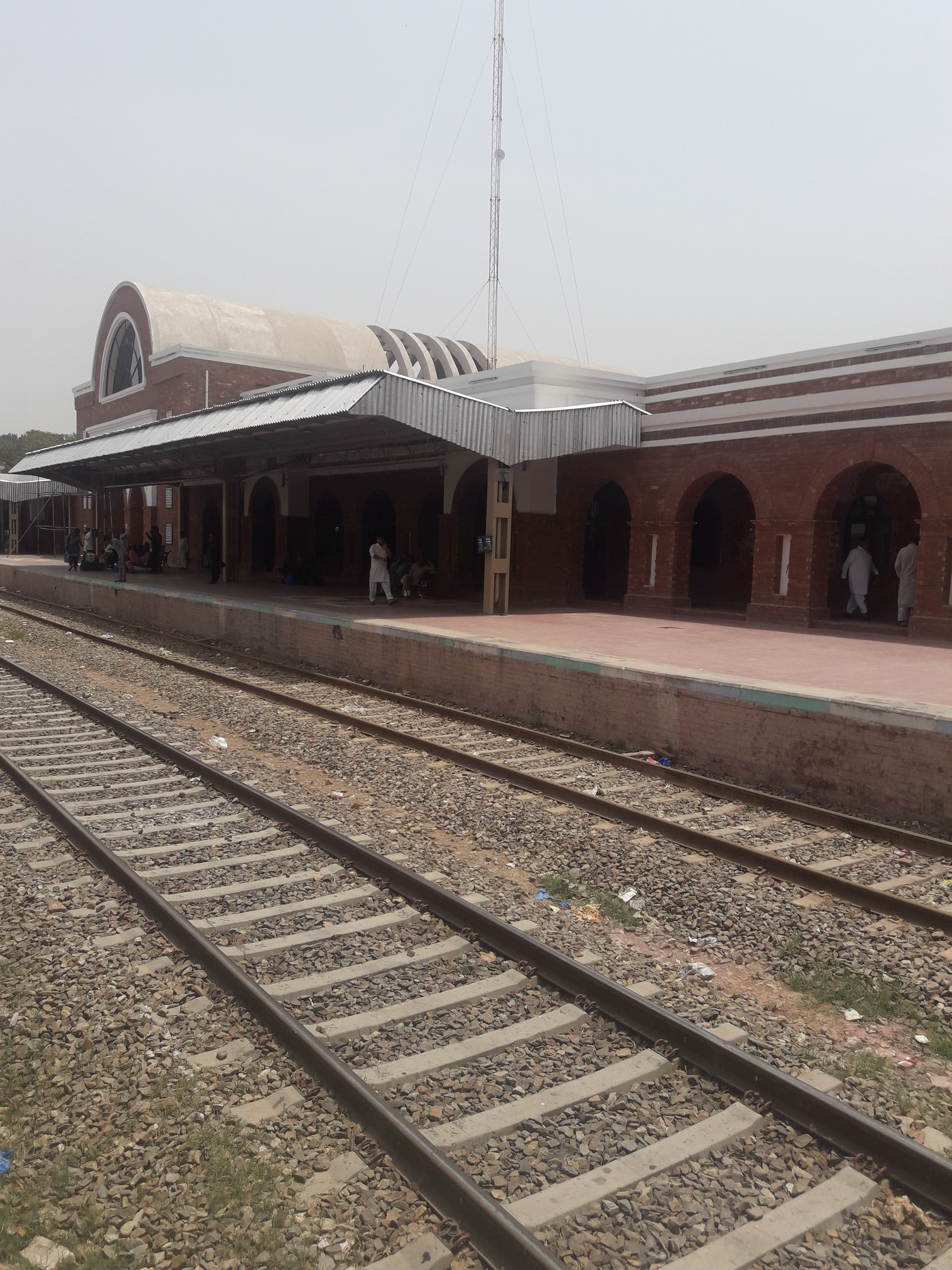

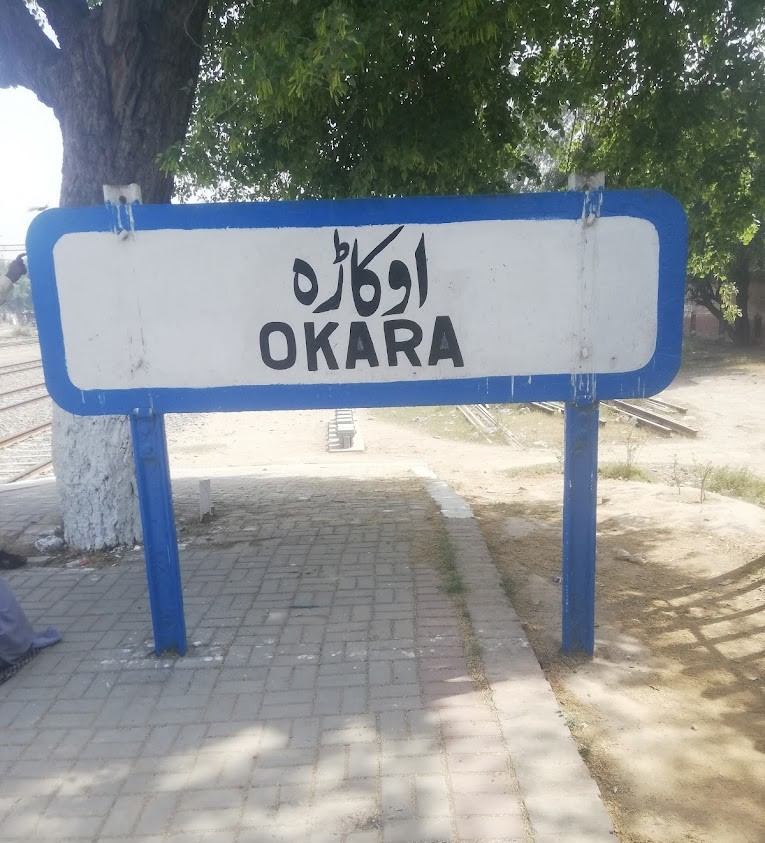

== See also ==
- List of railway stations in Pakistan
- Pakistan Railways
