= Deona Juliani railway station =

Railway station in Punjab, Pakistan

Deona Juliani Railway Station دیونا جولیانی ریلوے اسٹیشن

General information
- Coordinates: 32.632965°N 74.004892°E
- Owner: Ministry of Railways
- Line: Karachi–Peshawar Railway Line

Other information
- Station code: DEN

Services
Preceding station	Pakistan Railways	Following station
Gujrat towards Kiamari	Karachi–Peshawar Line	Lala Musa Junction towards Peshawar Cantonment
Location

Deona Juliani Railway Station (Urdu and Punjabi: دیونا جولیانی ریلوے اسٹیشن) is an abandoned railway station located in Dewna Mandi village, Gujrat district of Punjab province, Pakistan.

== See also ==
- List of railway stations in Pakistan
- Pakistan Railways
