= Departure Yard Railway Station =

Railway station in Karachi, Pakistan

Departure Yard Railway Station ڈیپارچر یارڈ ریل گاڑی اسٹیشن

General information
- Owner: Ministry of Railways
- Line: Karachi–Peshawar Railway Line

Other information
- Station code: DPY

History
- Opened: 1964

Services
Preceding station	Pakistan Railways	Following station
Karachi Cantonment towards Kiamari	Karachi–Peshawar Line	Drigh Road towards Peshawar Cantonment
Location

Departure Yard Railway Station (Urdu: ڈیپارچر یارڈ ریل گاڑی سٹیشن) is located near Baloch Colony flyover on Sharah-e-Faisal in Karachi, Pakistan.

== See also ==
- List of railway stations in Pakistan
- Pakistan Railways
