= Harappa railway station =

Railway station in Punjab, Pakistan

Harappa Railway Station ہڑپہ ریلوے اسٹیشن

General information
- Coordinates: 30.5985°N 72.9068°E
- Owner: Ministry of Railways
- Line: Karachi–Peshawar Railway Line

Other information
- Station code: HAP

Services
Preceding station	Pakistan Railways	Following station
Chichawatni towards Kiamari	Karachi–Peshawar Line	Sahiwal towards Peshawar Cantonment
Location

Harappa Railway Station (Urdu and Punjabi: ہڑپہ ریلوے اسٹیشن) is located in Harappa village, Sahiwal district of Punjab province of Pakistan.

== See also ==
- List of railway stations in Pakistan
- Pakistan Railways
