= Tando Adam Junction railway station =

Railway station in Tando Adam Khan, Pakistan

Tando Adam Junction Station ٹنڈو آدم جنکشن ریلوے اسٹیشن ٽنڊو آدم جنڪشن ريلوي اسٽيشن

General information
- Coordinates: 25.7608°N 68.6623°E
- Owner: Ministry of Railways
- Lines: Karachi–Peshawar Railway Line; Tando Adam–Mehrabpur Branch Line

Other information
- Station code: TDM

Services
Preceding station	Pakistan Railways	Following station
Wahab Shah towards Kiamari	Karachi–Peshawar Line	Jalal Marri towards Peshawar Cantonment
Location

Tando Adam Junction Railway Station (Urdu: ٹنڈو آدم جنکشن ریلوے اسٹیشن, Sindhi: ٽنڊوآدم جنڪشن ريلوي اسٽيشن) is located in Tando Adam city, Sanghar district of Sindh, Pakistan.

== Services ==
The following trains stop at Tando Adam Junction station:

Preceding station	Pakistan Railways	Following station
Hyderabad Junction towards Karachi Cantonment	Allama Iqbal Express	Nawabshah towards Sialkot Junction

== See also ==
- List of railway stations in Pakistan
- Pakistan Railways
