= Buch railway station =

Railway station in Pakistan

General information
- Owner: Ministry of Railways
- Line: Karachi–Peshawar Railway Line

Other information
- Station code: BUC

History
- Former names: Great Indian Peninsula Railway

Buch railway station (Urdu: بوچ ریلوے اسٹیشن) is located near Multan in Pakistan.

== Incident ==
On September 15, 2016, an Awam Express service going to Karachi from Peshawar had collided with a goods train at this station. The incident resulted in 4 deaths and 100 others injured. The main cause of this incident was signal system.

== See also ==
- List of railway stations in Pakistan
- Pakistan Railways
