= Gambat railway station =

Railway station in Pakistan

Gambat Railway Station گمبٹ ریلوے اسٹیشن گمبٽ ريلوي اسٽيشن

General information
- Coordinates: 27.3388°N 68.5445°E
- Owner: Ministry of Railways
- Line: Karachi–Peshawar Railway Line

Other information
- Station code: GBT

Services
Preceding station	Pakistan Railways	Following station
Ranipur Riyasat towards Kiamari	Karachi–Peshawar Line	Pir Katpar towards Peshawar Cantonment
Location

Gambat Railway Station (Urdu: گمبٹ ریلوے اسٹیشن, Sindhi: گمبٽ ريلوي اسٽيشن) is located in Gambat city, Khairpur District of Sindh province, Pakistan.

== See also ==
- List of railway stations in Pakistan
- Pakistan Railways
