= Kot Lalloo railway station =

Railway station in Pakistan

Kot Lalloo Railway Station کوٹ لالو ریلوے اسٹیشن ڪوٽ لالو ريلوي اسٽيشن

General information
- Coordinates: 26.6832°N 68.2928°E
- Owner: Ministry of Railways
- Line: Karachi–Peshawar Railway Line

Other information
- Station code: KQO

Services
Preceding station	Pakistan Railways	Following station
Bandhi towards Kiamari	Karachi–Peshawar Line	Pad Idan Junction towards Peshawar Cantonment
Location

Kot Lalloo Railway Station (Urdu: کوٹ لالو ریلوے اسٹیشن, Sindhi: ڪوٽ لالو ريلوي اسٽيشن) is located in Kot Lalloo village, Khairpur District of Sindh, Pakistan.

== See also ==
- List of railway stations in Pakistan
- Pakistan Railways
- Kot lalu
