= Ranipur Riyasat railway station =

Railway station in Pakistan

Ranipur Riyasat Station رانی پور ریاست ریلوے اسٹیشن راڻي پور رياست ريلوي اسٽيشن

General information
- Coordinates: 27.2804°N 68.5172°E
- Owner: Ministry of Railways
- Line: Karachi–Peshawar Railway Line

Other information
- Station code: RAN

Services
| Preceding station | Pakistan Railways | Following station |
|---|---|---|
| Setharja towards Kiamari | Karachi–Peshawar Line | Gambat towards Peshawar Cantonment |
Location

Ranipur Riyasat Railway Station (Urdu: رانی پور ریاست ریلوے اسٹیشن, Sindhi: راڻي پور رياست ريلوي اسٽيشن) is located in Ranipur town, Khairpur District of Sindh province, Pakistan.

== See also ==
- List of railway stations in Pakistan
- Pakistan Railways
