= Hump Yard railway station =

Railway station in Pakistan

General information
- Owner: Ministry of Railways
- Line: Karachi–Peshawar Railway Line

Other information
- Station code: HY

History
- Former names: Great Indian Peninsula Railway

Hump Yard railway station (Urdu: ہمپ یارڈ ریلوے اسٹیشن) is located in Pakistan.

== See also ==
- List of railway stations in Pakistan
- Pakistan Railways
