= Padidan railway station =

Railway station in Pakistan

Padidan Railway Station پڈ عیدن جنکشن ریلوے اسٹیشن پڊعيدن جنڪشن ريلوي اسٽيشن

General information
- Coordinates: 26.7767°N 68.2840°E
- Owner: Ministry of Railways
- Line: Karachi–Peshawar Railway Line

Other information
- Station code: PDN

History
- Opened: 1885

Services
Preceding station	Pakistan Railways	Following station
Kot Lalloo towards Kiamari	Karachi–Peshawar Line	Bhiria Road towards Peshawar Cantonment
Location

Pad Idan Railway Station (Urdu: پڈ عیدن ریلوے اسٹیشن, Sindhi: پڊعيدن ریلوي اسٽیشن) is located in Padidan town, Naushahro Feroze district of Sindh province, Pakistan.

== See also ==
- List of railway stations in Pakistan
- Pakistan Railways
