= MQD =

MQD or mqd can refer to:

- Macquarie Dictionary, a dictionary of Australian English
- Madang, a dialect of the Mainstream Kenyah language, spoken in Indonesia and Malaysia, by ISO 639 code
- Manganoquadratite, a mineral; see List of mineral codes
- Maquinchao Airport, an airport in Maquinchao, Argentina, by IATA code
- Medallion Qualification Dollars, a type of frequent flier point offered in the SkyMiles program, run by American airline Delta Air Lines
- Mirdad Muafi railway station, a train station in Pakistan
- Major questions doctrine, a principle of interpretation in United States law
