= LTFC (disambiguation) =

Luton Town F.C. (LTFC) is an English football club.

LTFC may also refer to:

== Football clubs ==
=== China ===
- Liaoning Tieren F.C.

=== England ===
- Leek Town F.C.
- Leighton Town F.C.
- Littlehampton Town F.C.
- London Tigers F.C.
- Louth Town F.C.
- Lowestoft Town F.C.
- Lutterworth Town F.C.
- Lydd Town F.C.
- Lydney Town F.C.
- Lye Town F.C.
- Lymington Town F.C.

=== Ireland ===
- Longford Town F.C.

=== Scotland ===
- Largs Thistle F.C.
- Larkhall Thistle F.C.
- Lothian Thistle Hutchison Vale F.C.

=== Wales ===
- Llandudno Town F.C.
- Llangefni Town F.C.

=== Northern Ireland ===
- Lurgan Town F.C.

== Other meanings ==
- Isparta Süleyman Demirel Airport, Turkey
- Latif Chang railway station, Pakistan
