= Hasan Abdal railway station =

Railway station in Punjab, Pakistan

Hasan Abdal Railway Station حسن ابدال ریلوے اسٹیشن
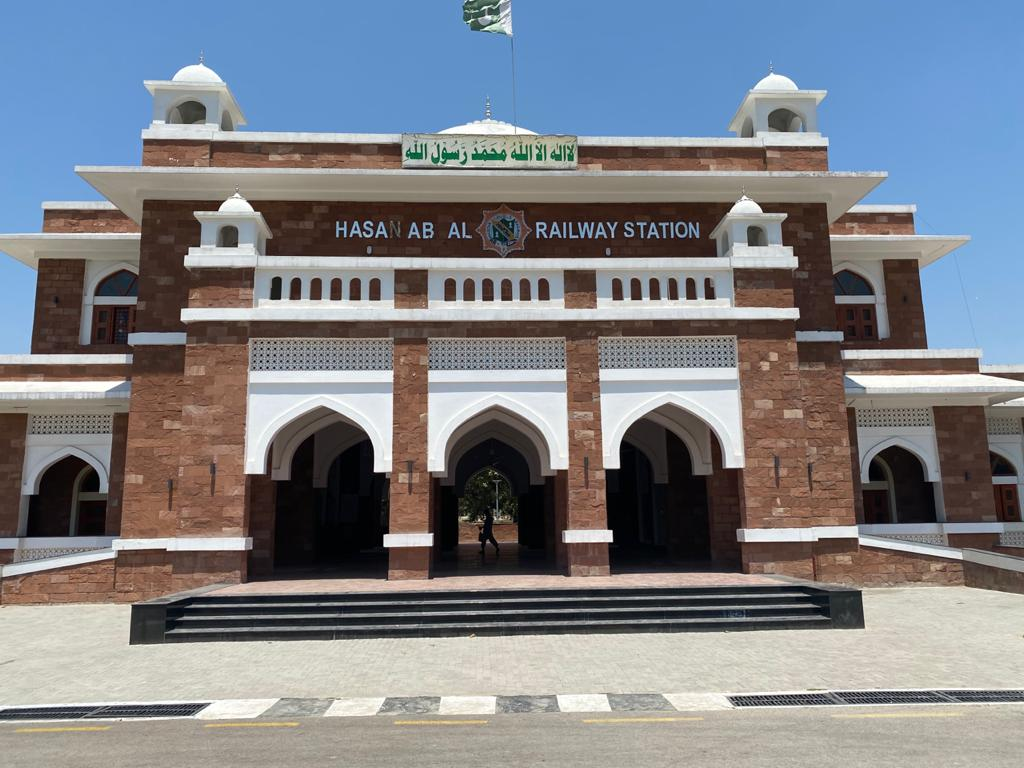

General information
- Coordinates: 33.8268°N 72.6993°E
- Owner: Ministry of Railways
- Line: Karachi–Peshawar Railway Line
- Platforms: 3

Construction
- Parking: Available

Other information
- Station code: HSN

History
- Opened: 1893

Services
Preceding station	Pakistan Railways	Following station
Wah towards Kiamari	Karachi–Peshawar Line	Burhan towards Peshawar Cantonment
Location

Hasan Abdal Railway Station (Urdu and Punjabi: حسن ابدال ریلوے اسٹیشن) is located in Hasan Abdal town, Attock district of Punjab province, Pakistan. The new building was inaugurated in 2020 by the then Prime minister Imran Khan.

== Renovation ==
Established in 1893, the British-era railway station has been renovated and reconstructed after 127 years. The railway station has been upgraded to a two-storey structure which cost Rs. 260 million (US$930,000), which included better facilities especially for Sikh pilgrims and it was inaugurated by the then Prime Minister of Pakistan Imran Khan on 6 November 2020.

== See also ==
- List of railway stations in Pakistan
- Pakistan Railways
- Hasan Abdal
- Gurdwara Panja Sahib
