= Sahiwal railway station =

Railway station in Punjab, Pakistan

Sahiwal Railway Station ساہیوال ریلوے اسٹیشن
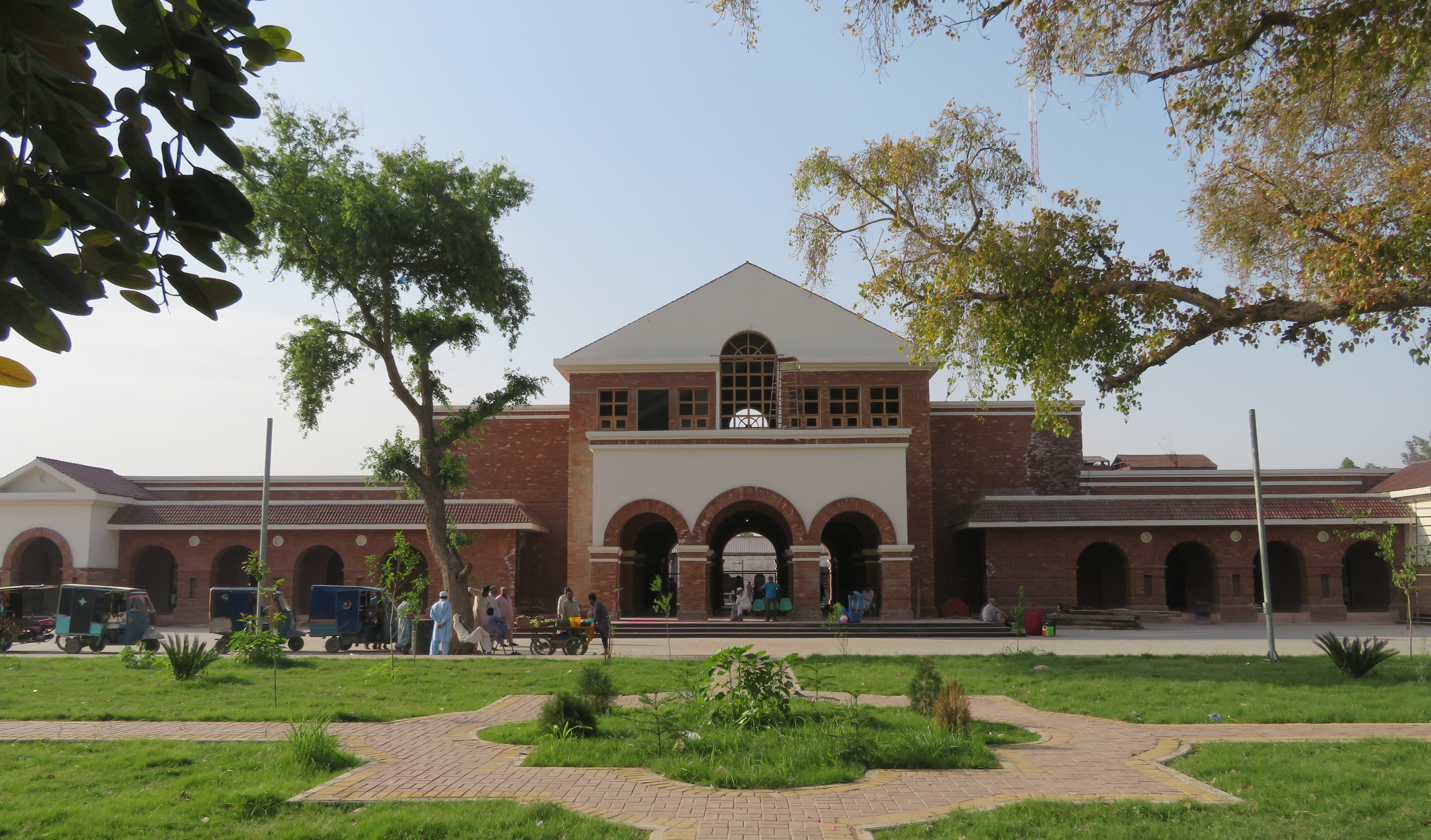

General information
- Coordinates: 30.6544°N 73.1009°E
- Owner: Ministry of Railways
- Line: Karachi–Peshawar Railway Line

Other information
- Station code: SWAL

History
- Opened: 1865; 2018 (reconstructed)

Services
Preceding station	Pakistan Railways	Following station
Harappa towards Kiamari	Karachi–Peshawar Line	Yusafwala towards Peshawar Cantonment
Location

Sahiwal Railway Station (Urdu and Punjabi: ساہیوال ریلوے اسٹیشن) is located in Sahiwal city, Sahiwal district of Punjab province of the Pakistan.

== History ==
In 2016, the old building of the station was demolished and a budget of Rs. 221 million was spent to reconstruct the modern building. In May 2018, the upgraded building was inaugurated by Railway Minister Khawaja Saad Rafique.

== See also ==
- List of railway stations in Pakistan
- Pakistan Railways
