= Dina railway station =

Railway station in Punjab, Pakistan

Dina Railway Station دینہ ریلوے اسٹیشن
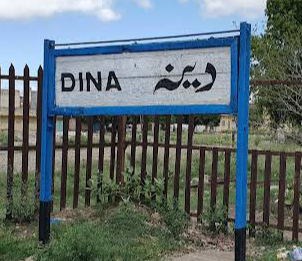

General information
- Coordinates: 33.0246°N 73.6032°E
- Owner: Ministry of Railways
- Line: Karachi–Peshawar Railway Line

Other information
- Station code: DIN

History
- Opened: 1926

Services
Preceding station	Pakistan Railways	Following station
Kaluwal towards Kiamari	Karachi–Peshawar Line	Ratial towards Peshawar Cantonment
Location

Dina Railway Station (Urdu and Punjabi: دینہ ریلوے اسٹیشن) is located in Dina city, Jhelum district of Punjab province of the Pakistan.

== Gallery ==
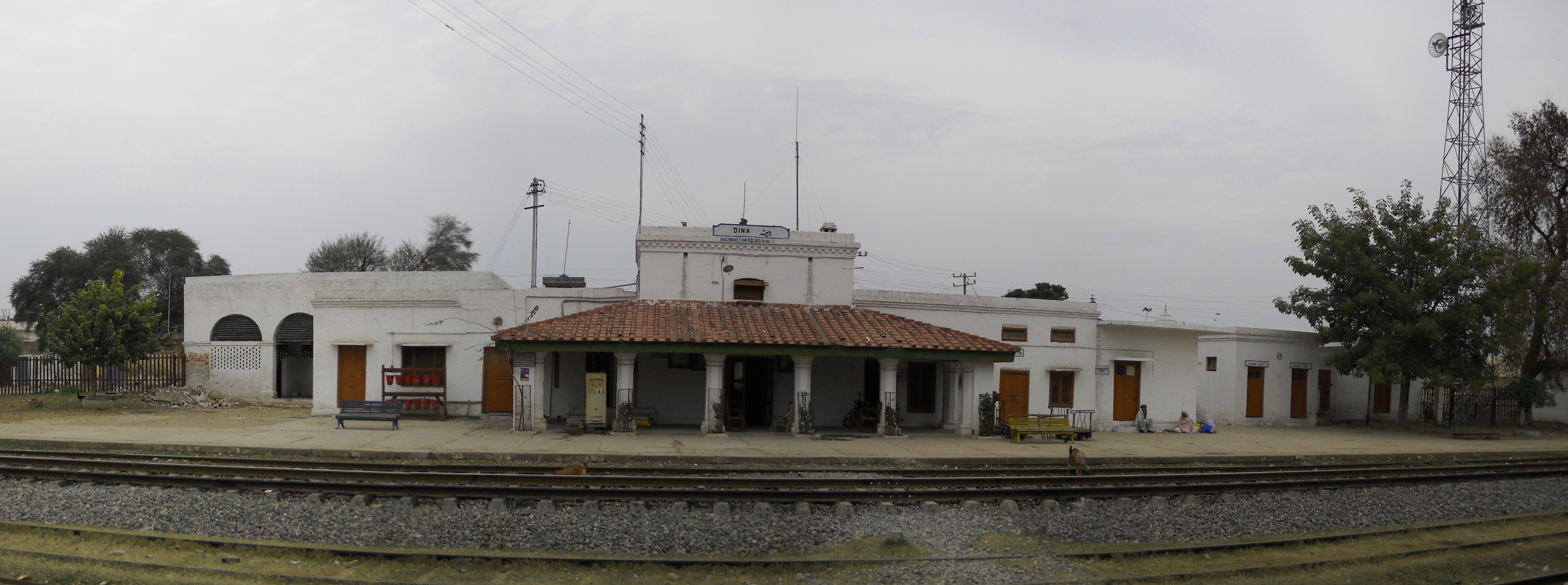

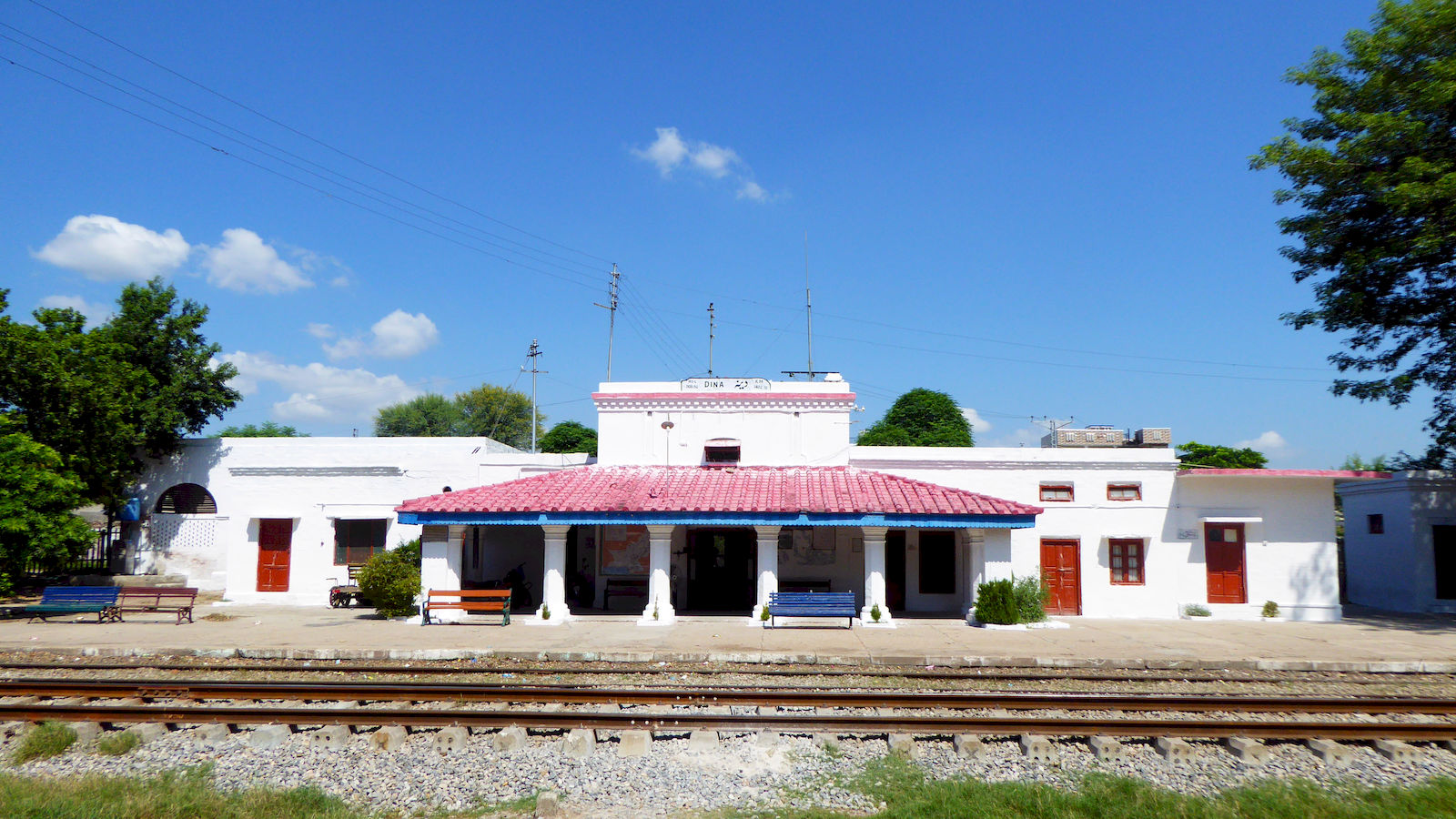
Dina railway station

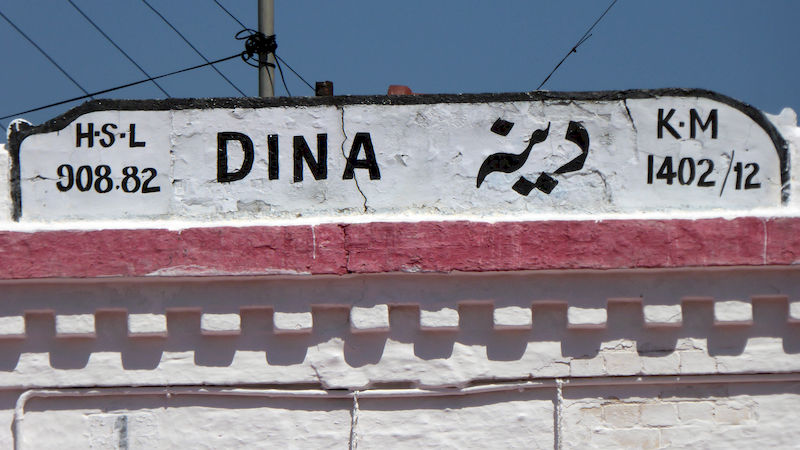
Dina railway station tag

== See also ==
- List of railway stations in Pakistan
- Pakistan Railways
