= Kharian Cantonment railway station =

Railway station in Pakistan

Kharian Cantonment Railway Station کھاریاں کینٹ ریلوے اسٹیشن
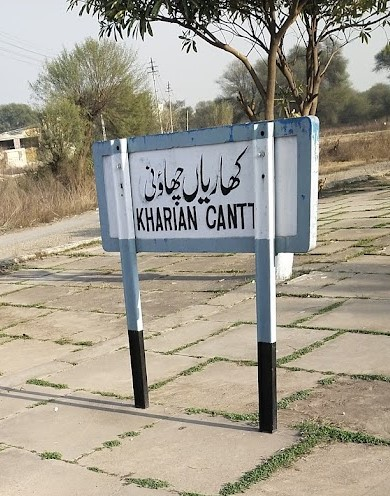

General information
- Coordinates: 32.7734°N 73.8899°E
- Owner: Ministry of Railways
- Line: Karachi–Peshawar Railway Line

Other information
- Station code: KRNC

Services
Preceding station	Pakistan Railways	Following station
Chak Pirana towards Kiamari	Karachi–Peshawar Line	Kharian towards Peshawar Cantonment
Location

Kharian Cantonment Railway Station (Urdu and Punjabi: کھاریاں کینٹ ریلوے اسٹیشن) is located in the Kharian cantonment area near Kharian city, Gujrat district of Punjab province of Pakistan.

== See also ==
- List of railway stations in Pakistan
- Pakistan Railways
