= YSW =

YSW could refer to:

- Yiddish Summer Weimar, a celebration of Yiddish culture in Weimar, Germany
- Yusafwala railway station, a train station in Yusafwala, Pakistan
- Yingshang County, a county in Anhui province, China; see List of administrative divisions of Anhui
