= HLO =

HLO may refer to:

- Halloki Halt railway station, in Pakistan
- Health Licensing Office of the Oregon Public Health Division
- Heiloo railway station, in the Netherlands
- Helicopter landing officer
- Australian Stock Exchange code for Helloworld Travel Ltd
- High level outline, a term for High-level design
- Homeless liaison officer
