= GHO (disambiguation) =

GHO or Gho may refer to:

- Gho, a traditional garment worn by Bhutanese men
- .gho, a file extension used by Ghost
- Gaza Humanitarian Organization
- Gharo railway station, in Pakistan
- Ghomara language
- Global Health Observatory
- Global HELP Organization
- Greater Hartford Open, now the Travelers Championship, an American golf tournament
- Joaquín Gho, Argentine professional footballer
