= Mirpur Mathelo railway station =

Railway station in Mirpur Mathelo, Pakistan

Mirpur Mathelo Railway Station میرپور ماتھیلو ریلوے اسٹیشن ميرپور ماٿيلو ريلوي اسٽيشن

General information
- Coordinates: 28.0193°N 69.5527°E
- Owner: Ministry of Railways
- Line: Karachi–Peshawar Railway Line

Other information
- Station code: MRP

Services
Preceding station	Pakistan Railways	Following station
Sarhad towards Kiamari	Karachi–Peshawar Line	Daharki towards Peshawar Cantonment
Location

Mirpur Mathelo Railway Station (Urdu: میرپور ماتھیلو ریلوے اسٹیشن, Sindhi: میرپور ماٿيلو ریلوي اسٽیشن) is located in Mirpur Mathelo town, Ghotki district of Sindh province, Pakistan.

== See also ==
- List of railway stations in Pakistan
- Pakistan Railways
