= Jehangira Road railway station =

Train station in Pakistan

Jehangira Road Station جہانگیرہ روڈ ریلوے اسٹیشن

General information
- Coordinates: 33.9586°N 72.1969°E
- Line: Karachi–Peshawar Railway Line

Other information
- Station code: JHR

History
- Opened: 1882

Services
Preceding station	Pakistan Railways	Following station
Khairabad Kund towards Kiamari	Karachi–Peshawar Line	Akora Khattak towards Peshawar Cantonment
Location

Jehangira Road Railway Station (Urdu: جہانگیرہ روڈ ریلوے اسٹیشن, Pashto: د جہانگیرہ سڑک اورګاډي سټيشن) is located in Jehangira Road town, Nowshera district of Khyber Pakhtunkhwa province of the Pakistan. The station is on Karachi–Peshawar Railway Line.

== See also ==
- List of railway stations in Pakistan
- Pakistan Railways
