= Nawaz Dahri railway station =

Railway station in Pakistan

Coordinates: 26.172471°N 68.442161°E

General information
- Owner: Ministry of Railways
- Line: Karachi–Peshawar Railway Line

Other information
- Station code: NZH

History
- Former names: Great Indian Peninsula Railway
Location

Nawaz Dahri railway station (Urdu: نواز ڈاہری ریلوے اسٹیشن, Sindhi: نواز ڏاھري ريلوي اسٽيشن) is an abandoned railway station located in Sindh Pakistan. The station was made abandoned by Pakistan Railways in 1997.

== See also ==
- List of railway stations in Pakistan
- Pakistan Railways
