= Setharja railway station =

Railway station in Pakistan

Setharja Railway Station سیٹھارجہ ریلوے اسٹیشن سيٺارجا ريلوي اسٽيشن

General information
- Coordinates: 27.2039°N 68.4769°E
- Owner: Ministry of Railways
- Line: Karachi–Peshawar Railway Line

Other information
- Station code: STJ

Services
Preceding station	Pakistan Railways	Following station
Mahrabpur Junction towards Kiamari	Karachi–Peshawar Line	Ranipur Riyasat towards Peshawar Cantonment
Location

Setharja Railway Station (Urdu: سیٹھارجہ ریلوے اسٹیشن, Sindhi: سيٺارجا ريلوي اسٽيشن) is located in Setharja town Thari Mirwah tehsil, Khairpur of Sindh province, Pakistan.

== See also ==
- List of railway stations in Pakistan
- Pakistan Railways
