= Lohi Bher railway station =

Railway station in Pakistan

Lohi Bher Railway Station

General information
- Owner: Ministry of Railways
- Line: Karachi–Peshawar Railway Line

Other information
- Status: Closed
- Station code: LBR

History
- Former names: Great Indian Peninsula Railway
Location

Lohi Bher Railway Station (Urdu: لوہی بھیر ریلوے اسٹیشن) is an abandoned railway station located in Islamabad Pakistan.

== See also ==
- List of railway stations in Pakistan
- Pakistan Railways
