= Musa Virk railway station =

Railway station in Pakistan

Coordinates: 30°25′N 72°18′E

General information
- Owner: Ministry of Railways
- Line: Karachi–Peshawar Railway Line

Other information
- Station code: MSVR

History
- Former names: Great Indian Peninsula Railway
Location

Musa Virk railway station (Urdu: موسیٰ ورک ریلوے اسٹیشن) is located in Pakistan.

== See also ==
- List of railway stations in Pakistan
- Pakistan Railways
