= Chandrami railway station =

Railway station in Pakistan

Chandrami Station چندرامی اسٹیشن

General information
- Coordinates: 28.3309°N 70.1688°E
- Owner: Ministry of Railways
- Line: Karachi–Peshawar Railway Line

Other information
- Station code: CDRN
Location

Chandrami railway station (Urdu: چندرامی ریلوے اسٹیشن) is an abandoned railway station located in Pakistan.

== See also ==
- List of railway stations in Pakistan
- Pakistan Railways
