= Mughal railway station =

Railway station in Pakistan

Coordinates: 33°31′N 73°14′E

Mughal Railway Station

General information
- Owner: Ministry of Railways
- Line: Karachi–Peshawar Railway Line

Other information
- Station code: MGL

History
- Former names: Great Indian Peninsula Railway
Location

Mughal Railway Station (Urdu: مغل ریلوے اسٹیشن) is an abandoned railway station located in Pakistan.

== See also ==
- List of railway stations in Pakistan
- Pakistan Railways
