= Okara Cantonment railway station =

Railway station in Punjab, Pakistan

Okara Cantonment Station اوکاڑہ کینٹ ریلوے اسٹیشن
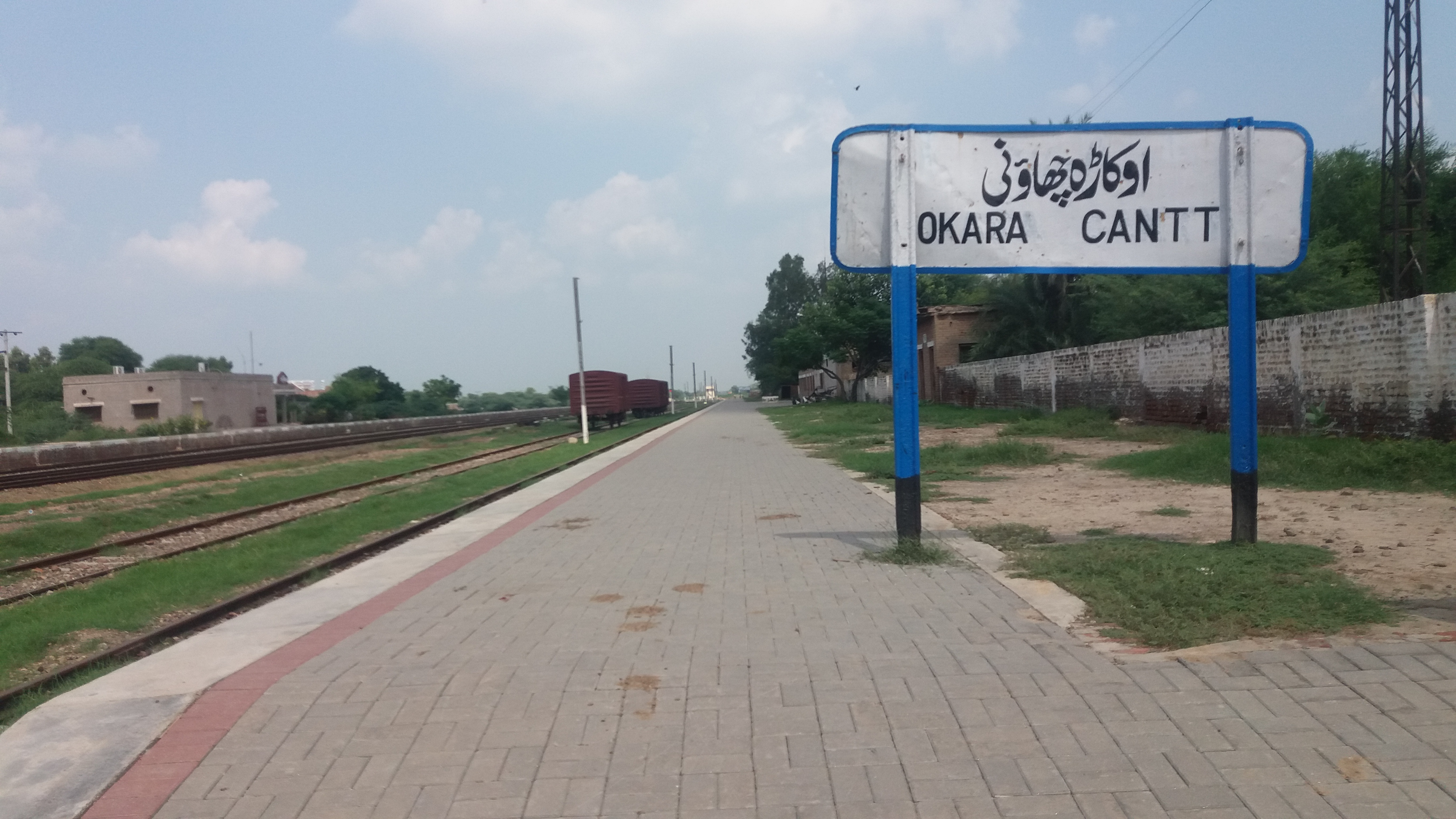
- Okara Cantonment railway station

General information
- Coordinates: 30.7500°N 73.3315°E
- Owner: Ministry of Railways
- Line: Karachi–Peshawar Railway Line
- Platforms: 1

Other information
- Station code: OKC

History
- Former names: Gambar Station

Services
Preceding station	Pakistan Railways	Following station
Yusafwala towards Kiamari	Karachi–Peshawar Line	Okara towards Peshawar Cantonment
Location

Okara Cantonment Railway Station (Urdu and Punjabi: اوکاڑہ کینٹ ریلوے اسٹیشن) is located in Okara Cantonment, 10 km away from Okara city, Okara district of Punjab province, Pakistan.

In May 2025, Okara Cantonment station was reported to be among 14 stations of Pakistan Railways' Lahore Division being converted to solar energy.

== See also ==
- List of railway stations in Pakistan
- Pakistan Railways
