= Theri Sansi railway station =

Railway station in Pakistan

Theri Sansi railway station تھیری سانسی ریلوے اسٹیشن

General information
- Owner: Ministry of Railways
- Line: Karachi–Peshawar Railway Line

Other information
- Status: Closed
- Station code: TSE
Location

Theri Sansi railway station (Urdu: تھیری سانسی ریلوے اسٹیشن) is an abandoned railway station near Gujranwala City Pakistan. The station was closed due to less commercial working in 1992 according to locals.

== See also ==
- List of railway stations in Pakistan
- Pakistan Railways
