= Deparja railway station =

Railway station in Sindh, Pakistan

General information
- Owner: Ministry of Railways

Other information
- Station code: DPJA

History
- Former names: Great Indian Peninsula Railway
Location

Deparja railway station (Urdu: ڈیپارجا ریلوے اسٹیشن);Sindhi: ڏيپارجا ريلوي اسٽيشن) is located in Mirwah tehsil of Khairpur district, Sindh Pakistan.Deparja is a village at Deparja railway station. If going from Karachi to Lahore (South to North) this railway station comes before Setharja railway station.

== Nearest places ==
- Setharja
- Thari Mirwah
- Hingorja

== See also ==
- List of railway stations in Pakistan
- Pakistan Railways
