= Mujahidabad railway station =

Railway station in Pakistan

Coordinates: 29.66564°N 71.5188°E

General information
- Owner: Ministry of Railways
- Line: Karachi–Peshawar Railway Line

Other information
- Status: closed
- Station code: MJC

History
- Former names: Great Indian Peninsula Railway
Location

Mujahidabad railway station is an abandoned railway station (Urdu: مجاہد آباد ریلوے اسٹیشن) located in Pakistan.

== See also ==
- List of railway stations in Pakistan
- Pakistan Railways
