= Utram railway station =

Railway station in Pakistan

Coordinates: 24.97907°N 67.972001°E

General information
- Owner: Ministry of Railways
- Line: Karachi–Peshawar Railway Line

Other information
- Station code: OTR

History
- Former names: Great Indian Peninsula Railway
Location

Utram railway station (Urdu: اترام ریلوے اسٹیشن) is located in Pakistan.

== See also ==
- List of railway stations in Pakistan
- Pakistan Railways
