= Empress Bridge =

Empress Bridge امپریس پل
- Coordinates: 29.447152°N 71.653175°E
- Carries: Karachi–Peshawar Railway Line
- Crosses: Sutlej River
- Locale: Adamwahan / Bahawalpur, Punjab, Pakistan
- Begins: Adamwahan, Lodhran District
- Ends: Bahawalpur District
- Other name(s): Adamwahan Bridge, Sutlej Bridge
- Named for: Queen Victoria (as Empress of India)
- Owner: Pakistan Railways
- Maintained by: Pakistan Railways

Characteristics
- Design: Iron truss
- Material: Iron, bricks
- Total length: 610 m (2,000 ft)
- No. of spans: 8

Rail characteristics
- No. of tracks: 2

History
- Designer: Rendel, Palmer and Tritton
- Constructed by: Indus Valley State Railway
- Built: 1826
- Opened: 1878
- Rebuilt: 1929 (double-tracked)

Location
- Interactive map of Empress Bridge

The Empress Bridge, also known as Adamwahan Bridge, is a railway bridge over the Sutlej River that provides a rail link between Punjab and Sindh. It is named after Queen Victoria who held the title of Empress of India.

== History ==
The bridge was originally commissioned in 1826 by the British during the reign of Bahawal Khan III to support the rail transport of goods and passengers. Its structural design used iron bars to form a single-track railway crossing. It was designed by Irish engineer William St. John Galwey and was opened in 1878.

In 1926, an upgrade project was initiated to increase the bridge’s carrying capacity. The consulting engineering firm Rendel, Palmer and Tritton converted the bridge from a single track to a double track by 1929.

== In popular culture ==
In 2019, a historical novel Anwasi by Hafeez Khan, which focuses on the construction of the Empress Bridge over the Sutlej River in the late nineteenth century, was published.
