= Yusafwala railway station =

Railway station in Punjab, Pakistan

Yusafwala Railway Station یوسف والا اسٹیشن

General information
- Coordinates: 30.7176°N 73.2652°E
- Owner: Ministry of Railways
- Line: Karachi–Peshawar Railway Line

Other information
- Station code: YSW

Services
Preceding station	Pakistan Railways	Following station
Sahiwal towards Kiamari	Karachi–Peshawar Line	Okara Cantonment towards Peshawar Cantonment
Location

Yusafwala Railway Station (Urdu and Punjabi: یوسف والا ریلوے اسٹیشن) is located in Yusafwala village, Sahiwal district of Punjab province of the Pakistan.

== History ==
In 2016, the reconstruction of the station was started, and it was completed in 2018 at a cost of Rs. 104 million.The station was inaugurated by the then railway minister Khawaja Saad Rafique. A coal handling facility was also developed at the station to supply coal to Sahiwal Coal Power Project. The station has a loco shed and a large freight yard which serves as a yard for Sahiwal Coal Power Project

== See also ==
- List of railway stations in Pakistan
- Pakistan Railways
