= Wan Adhan railway station =

Railway station in Punjab, Pakistan

Wan Adhan Railway Station وان ادھان ریلوے اسٹیشن

General information
- Coordinates: 31.0317°N 73.5450°E
- Owner: Ministry of Railways
- Line: Karachi–Peshawar Railway Line

Other information
- Station code: WNAD
Location

Wan Adhan Railway Station (Urdu: وان ادھان ریلوے اسٹیشن) is a closed railway station located in Punjab, Pakistan.
