= Chichawatni railway station =

Railway station in Pakistan

Chichawatni Railway Station چیچہ وطنی ریلوے اسٹیشن
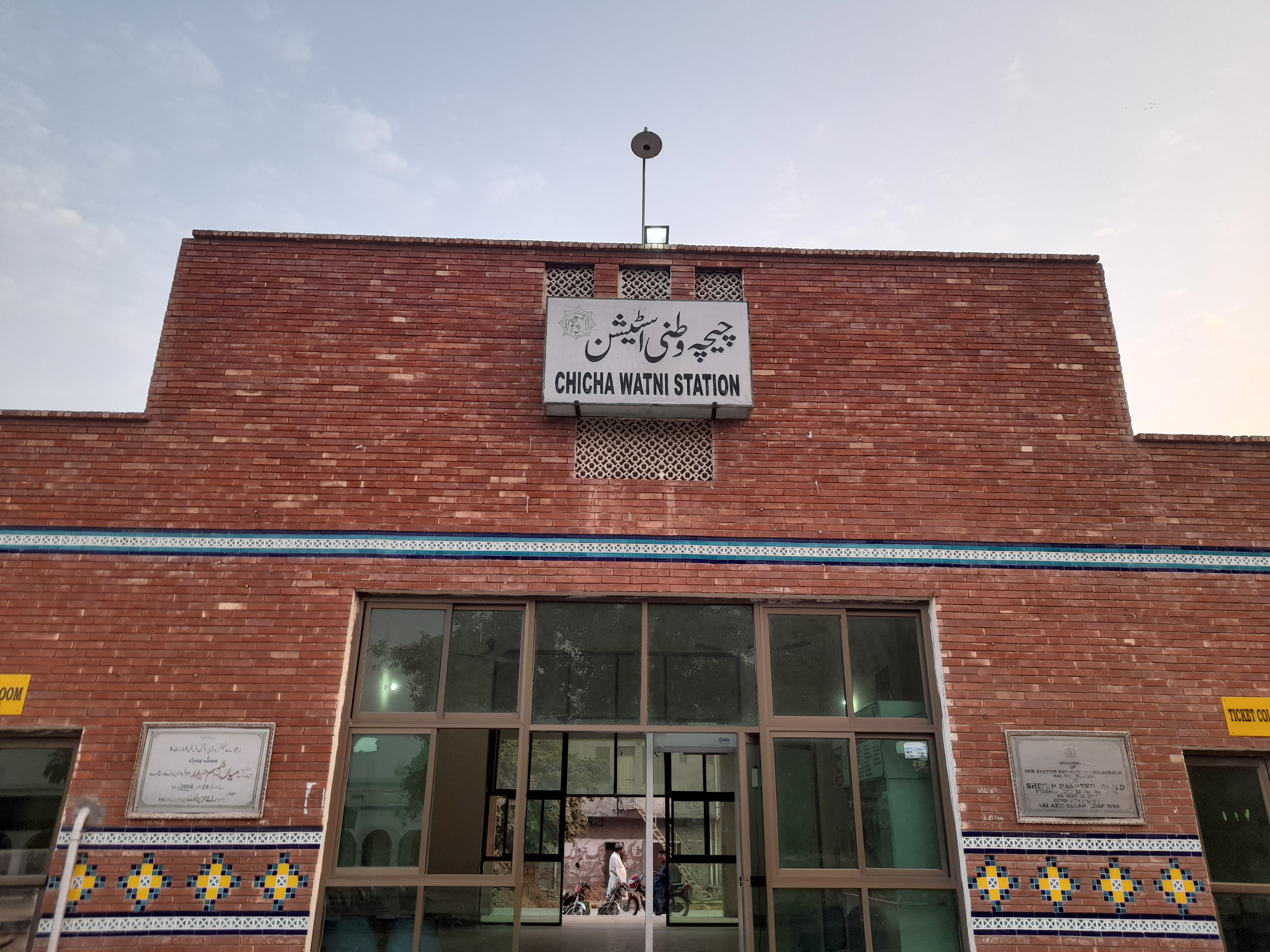
- Main building of the Chichawatni railway station

General information
- Coordinates: 30.5353°N 72.6903°E
- Owner: Ministry of Railways
- Line: Karachi–Peshawar Railway Line

Other information
- Station code: CCE

Services
Preceding station	Pakistan Railways	Following station
Kassowal towards Kiamari	Karachi–Peshawar Line	Harappa towards Peshawar Cantonment
Location

Chichawatni Railway Station (Urdu and Punjabi: چیچہ وطنی ریلوے اسٹیشن) is located in Chichawatni city, Sahiwal district of Punjab province of the Pakistan. In 2024, Pakistan Railways approved a two-minute stop for Business Express train, which travel from Lahore to Karachi, at Chichawatni station.

== Gallery ==
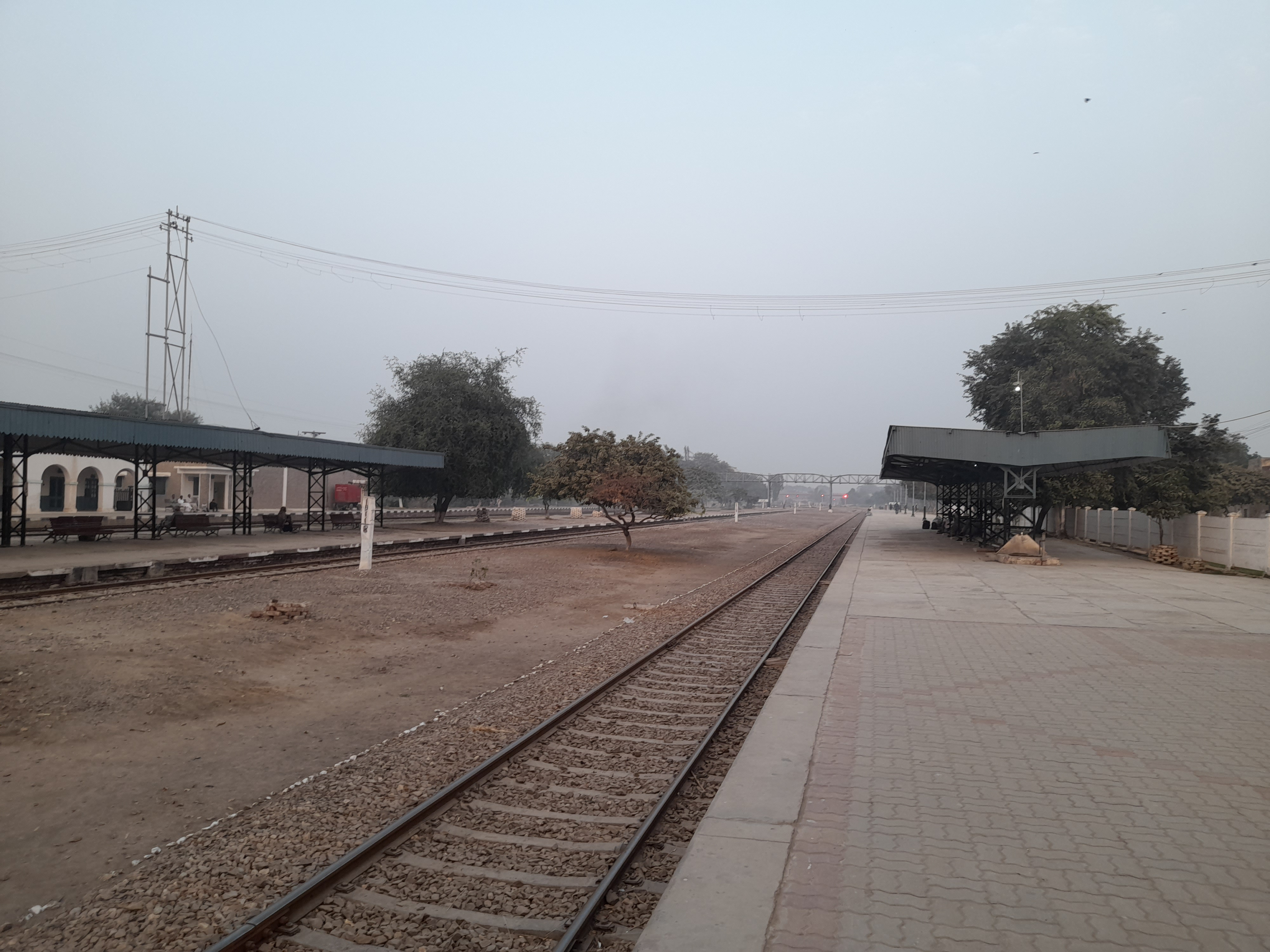
Chichawatni railway station's platform

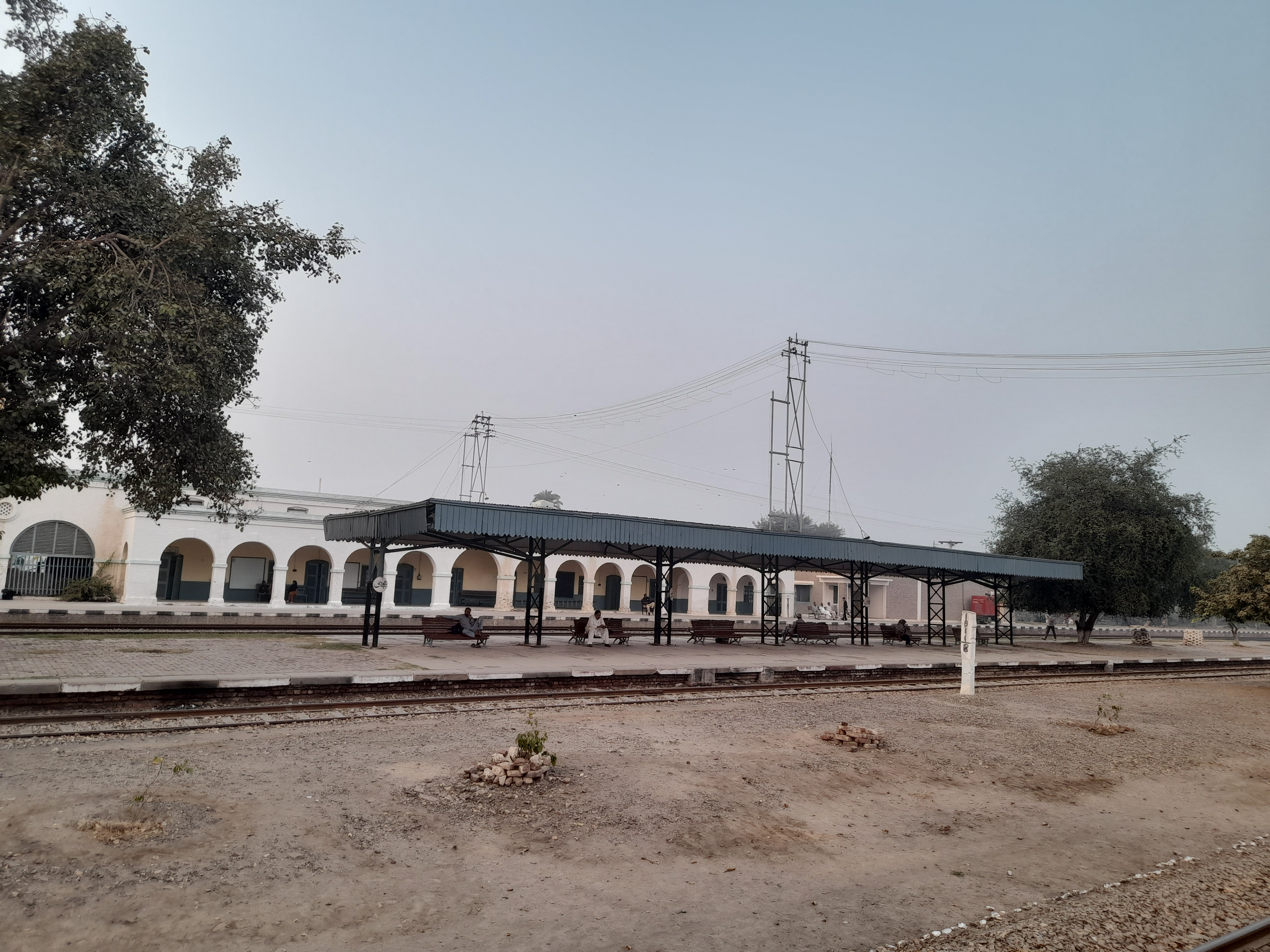
British-era building of the Chichawatni railway station

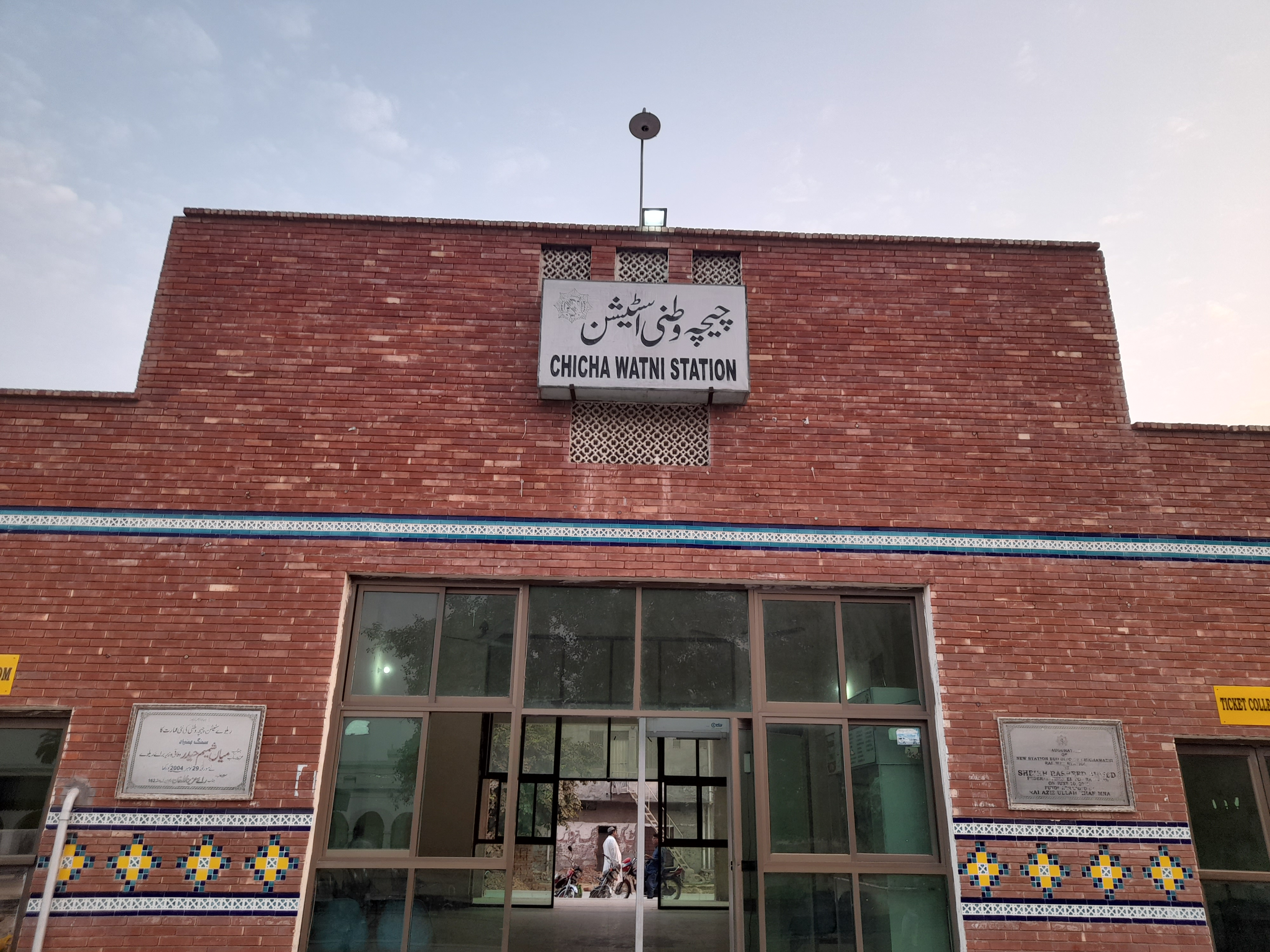
Chichawatni railway station new building

== See also ==
- List of railway stations in Pakistan
- Pakistan Railways
