= Kobar railway station =

Railway station in Pakistan

General information
- Owner: Ministry of Railways
- Line: Karachi–Peshawar Railway Line

Other information
- Station code: KBO

History
- Former names: Great Indian Peninsula Railway
Location

Kobar railway station (Urdu: کوبار ریلوے اسٹیشن) is located in Pakistan on the Karachi–Peshawar Railway Line.

== See also ==
- List of railway stations in Pakistan
- Pakistan Railways
