= Waris Ali Shaheed railway station =

Railway station in Punjab, Pakistan

Waris Ali Shaheed Station وارث علی شہید اسٹیشن

General information
- Coordinates: 30.2320°N 72.1136°E
- Owner: Ministry of Railways
- Line: Karachi–Peshawar Railway Line

Other information
- Station code: WSS
Location

Waris Ali Shaheed railway station (Urdu: وارث علی شہید ریلوے اسٹیشن) is a closed railway station located in Punjab, Pakistan.

== See also ==
- List of railway stations in Pakistan
- Pakistan Railways
