= Pindora railway station =

Railway station in Pakistan

General information
- Coordinates: 33.2265°N 73.3391°E
- Owner: Ministry of Railways

Other information
- Station code: PIND

History
- Former names: Great Indian Peninsula Railway
Location

Pindora railway station (Urdu: پنڈورا ریلوے اسٹیشن) is located in Pakistan.

== See also ==
- List of railway stations in Pakistan
- Pakistan Railways
