= Gharo railway station =

Railway station in Pakistan

Coordinates: 24.791993°N 67.553695°E

Gharo railway station گهارو ريلوي اسٽيشن

General information
- Owner: Ministry of Railways
- Line: Karachi–Peshawar Railway Line

Other information
- Station code: GHO

History
- Former names: Great Indian Peninsula Railway
Location

Gharo railway station (Urdu: گھارو ریلوے اسٹیشن, Sindhi: گهارو ريلوي اسٽيشن) is an abandoned railway station located in Gharo Town, Thatta District Pakistan.

== See also ==
- List of railway stations in Pakistan
- Pakistan Railways
