= Kotri Bridge =

Bridge in Sindh, Pakistan

Coordinates: 25.37266°N 68.31311°E

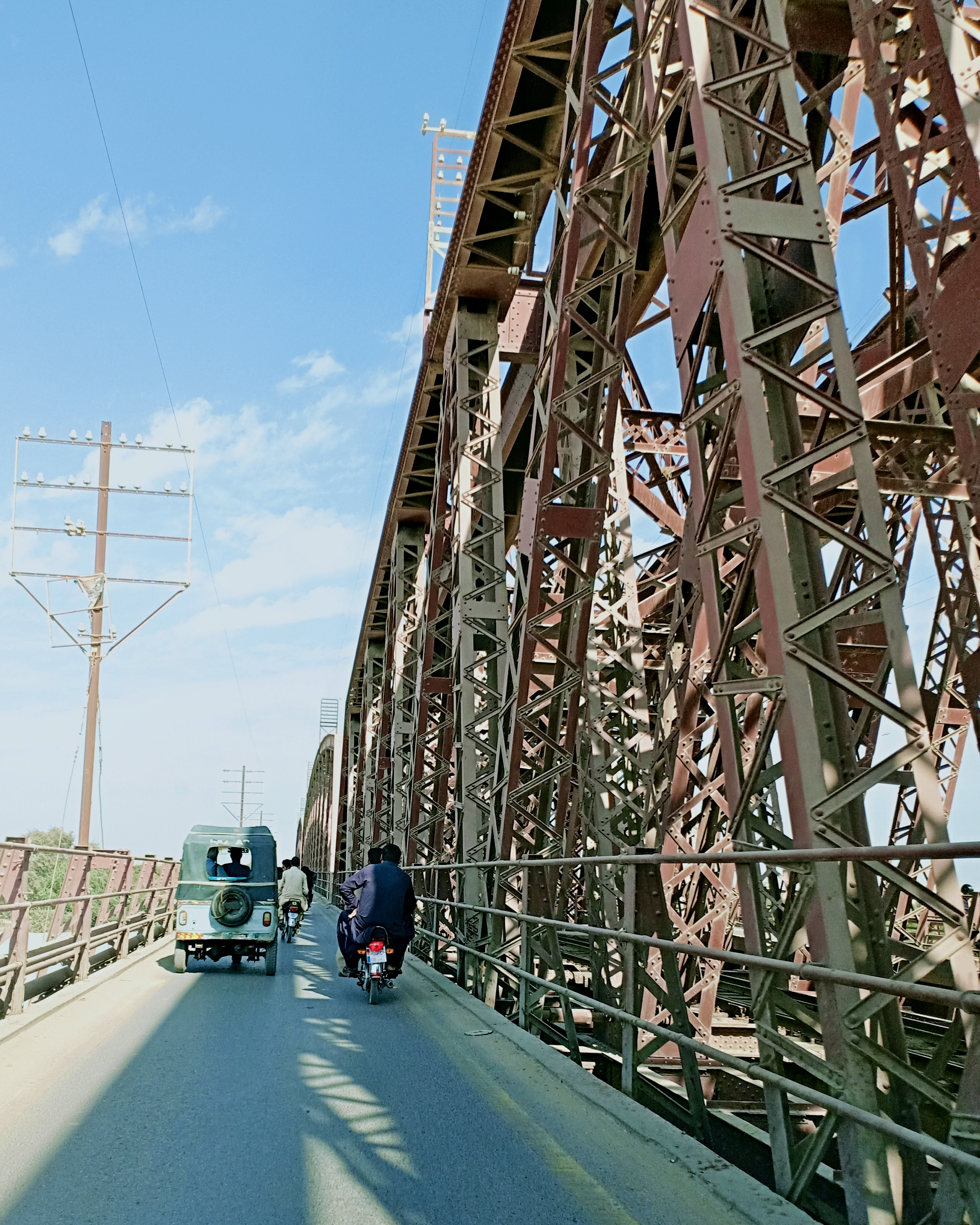
Kotri-Hyderabad Bridge

Kotri Bridge (Urdu: کوٹری پل) is a road-rail bridge situated between Kotri and Hyderabad on Indus River in Sindh, Pakistan.

== History ==
It was opened to traffic on 25 May 1900 and was reconstructed in 1931. It stretches over five spans and the total length of the bridge is 594 metres (1,948 ft).

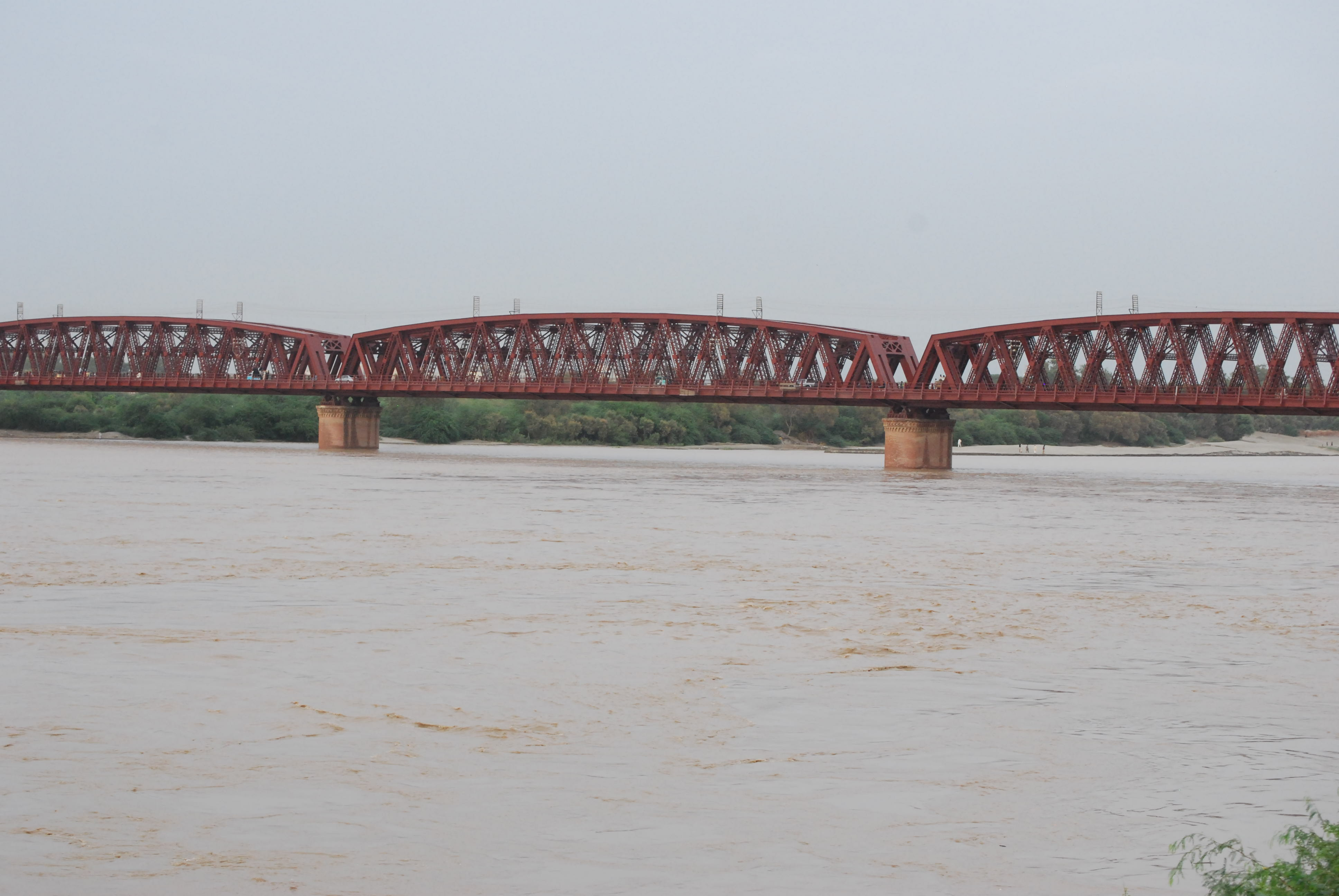
Kotri Bridge

It has a single railway track and roads on either side of railway track. In the early 1980s another railway bridge, known as Mehran Railway Bridge, was constructed alongside the old bridge. Kotri Bridge is still in use for one-way railway and two-way road traffic.

== See also ==
- Kotri Barrage (some miles upstream)
- Kotri Junction Railway Station
