= Latif Chang railway station =

Railway station in Pakistan

Coordinates: 25.084081°N 68.083274°E

General information
- Owner: Ministry of Railways
- Line: Karachi–Peshawar Railway Line

Other information
- Status: closed
- Station code: LTFC

History
- Former names: Great Indian Peninsula Railway
Location

Latif Chang railway station (Urdu: لطیف چھانگ ریلوے اسٹیشن) is an abandoned railway station located in Pakistan.

== See also ==
- List of railway stations in Pakistan
- Pakistan Railways
