= Sialabad railway station =

Railway station in Pakistan

General information
- Coordinates: 27.045°N 68.383°E
- Owner: Ministry of Railways

Other information
- Station code: SLBD

History
- Former names: Great Indian Peninsula Railway
Location

Sialabad railway station (Urdu: سیال آباد ریلوے اسٹیشن) is located in Pakistan.

== See also ==
- List of railway stations in Pakistan
- Pakistan Railways
