= Hingoro Road Halt railway station =

Railway station in Pakistan

Hingoro Road Halt railway station هنڱورو روڊ هالٽ ريلوي اسٽيشن

General information
- Owner: Ministry of Railways

Other information
- Station code: HGO

History
- Former names: Great Indian Peninsula Railway
Location

Hingoro Road Halt railway station (Urdu: ہنگورو روڈ ہالٹ ریلوے اسٹیشن, Sindhi: هنڱورو روڊ هالٽ ريلوي اسٽيشن) is located in Pakistan.

== See also ==
- List of railway stations in Pakistan
- Pakistan Railways
