= Banni Bangla railway station =

Railway station in Pakistan

General information
- Coordinates: 32.83928°N 73.83402°E
- Owner: Ministry of Railways

Other information
- Station code: BBNG

History
- Former names: Great Indian Peninsula Railway
Location

Banni Bangla railway station (Urdu: بننی بنگلہ ریلوے اسٹیشن) is an abandoned railway station located in between Kharian and Sarai Alamgir, Pakistan.

== See also ==
- List of railway stations in Pakistan
- Pakistan Railways
