= Tandoi railway station =

Railway station in Pakistan

Coordinates: 33°09′N 73°24′E

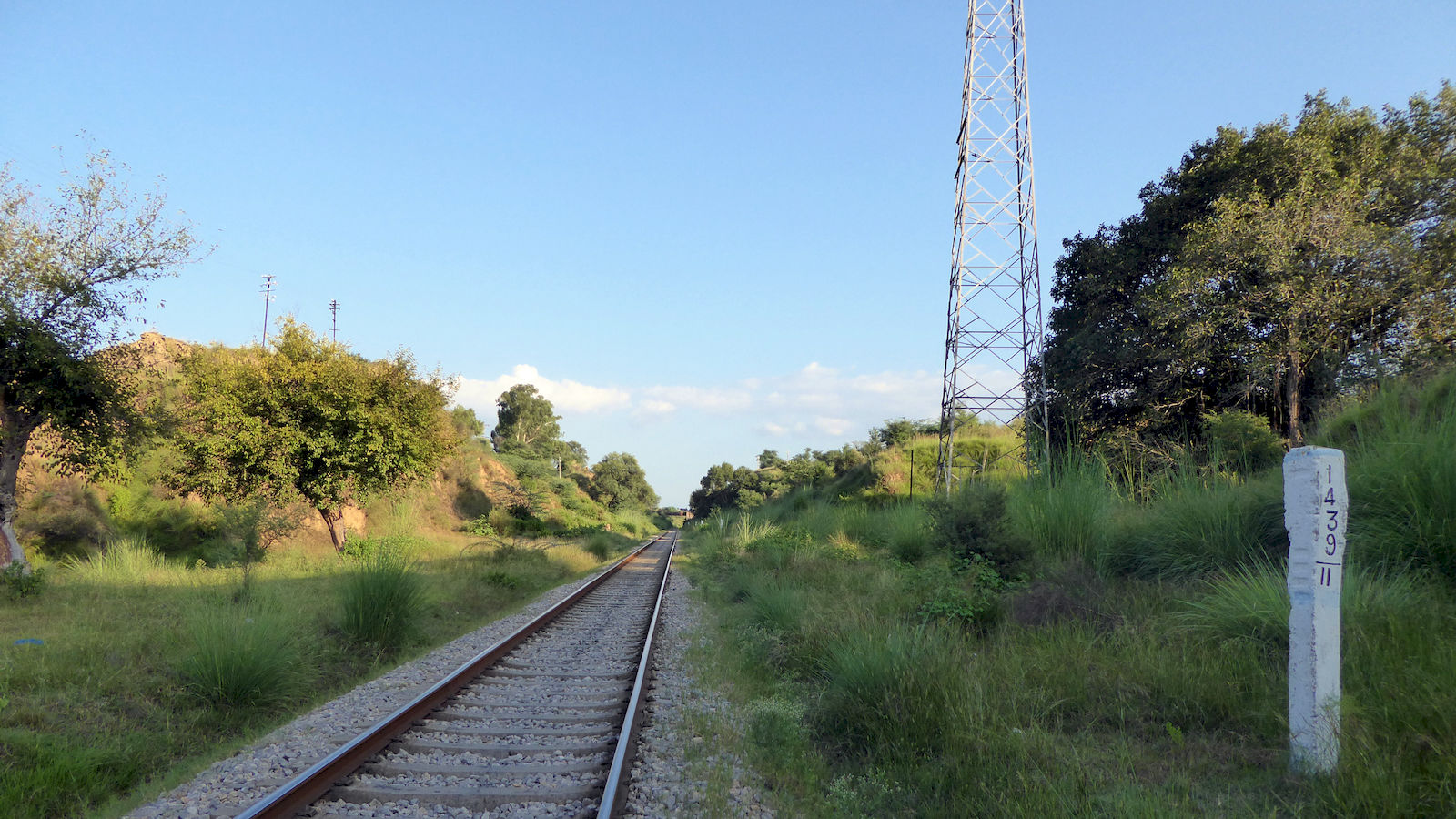
- ‌Location of Tandoi railway station

General information
- Owner: Ministry of Railways

Other information
- Station code: TDIA
Location

Tandoi railway station (Urdu: ٹنڈوئی ریلوے اسٹیشن) is located in Pakistan on the Karachi-Peshawar main line. It is an abandoned station, the building is no longer there and the only sign left is the old communication tower.

== See also ==
- List of railway stations in Pakistan
- Pakistan Railways
