= Masud Akhtar Shahid railway station =

Railway station in Pakistan

General information
- Owner: Ministry of Railways

Other information
- Station code: MAAS

History
- Former names: Great Indian Peninsula Railway
Location

Masud Akhtar Shahid railway station (Urdu: مسعود اختر شاہد ریلوے اسٹیشن) was a train station located in Pakistan.

== See also ==
- List of railway stations in Pakistan
- Pakistan Railways
