= Nur Muhammad Mokal railway station =

Railway station in Pakistan

Coordinates: 30°40′N 73°09′E

Nur Muhammad Mokal Railway Station

General information
- Owner: Ministry of Railways

Other information
- Station code: NMML

History
- Former names: Great Indian Peninsula Railway
Location

Nur Muhammad Mokal Railway Station (Urdu: نور محمد موکل ریلوے اسٹیشن) is located in Pakistan.

== See also ==
- List of railway stations in Pakistan
- Pakistan Railways
