= Tabruk railway station =

Pakistani rail station

General information
- Owner: Ministry of Railways

Other information
- Station code: TBRQ

History
- Former names: Great Indian Peninsula Railway
Location

Tabruk railway station (Urdu: تبرک ریلوے اسٹیشن) is located in Pakistan.

== See also ==
- List of railway stations in Pakistan
- Pakistan Railways
