= Karyal Halt railway station =

Railway station in Pakistan

Karyal Halt Railway Station

General information
- Owner: Ministry of Railways

Other information
- Station code: KRYL
Location

Karyal Halt Railway Station (Urdu: کڑیال ہالٹ ریلوے اسٹیشن) is located in Pakistan.

== See also ==
- List of railway stations in Pakistan
- Pakistan Railways
