= Tibbi Izzat railway station =

Railway station in Pakistan

Coordinates: 29.198106°N 71.316632°E

General information
- Owner: Ministry of Railways

Other information
- Station code: TZT

History
- Former names: Great Indian Peninsula Railway
Location

Tibbi Izzat railway station (Urdu: ٹبی عزت ریلوے اسٹیشن) is located in Pakistan.

== See also ==
- List of railway stations in Pakistan
- Pakistan Railways
