= Halloki Halt railway station =

Railway station in Pakistan

General information
- Coordinates: 31.3725°N 74.2900°E
- Owner: Ministry of Railways
- Line: Karachi–Peshawar Railway Line

Other information
- Station code: HLO

History
- Former names: Great Indian Peninsula Railway
Location

Halloki Halt railway station (Urdu: ہالوکی ہالٹ ریلوے اسٹیشن) is located in Pakistan.

== See also ==
- List of railway stations in Pakistan
- Pakistan Railways
