= Sanjwal Cantonment railway station =

Railway station in Punjab, Pakistan

General information
- Owner: Ministry of Railways

Other information
- Station code: SJC

History
- Former names: Great Indian Peninsula Railway
Location

Sanjwal Cantonment railway station (Urdu: سنجوال کینٹ ریلوے اسٹیشن) is located in Sanjwal Cantonment, Attock District, Pakistan.

== See also ==
- List of railway stations in Pakistan
- Pakistan Railways
