= Ghulamabad railway station =

Railway station in Pakistan

Ghulamabad railway station غلام آباد ريلوي اسٽيشن

General information
- Owner: Ministry of Railways

Other information
- Station code: GABD

History
- Former names: Great Indian Peninsula Railway
Location

Ghulamabad railway station (Urdu: غلام آباد ریلوے اسٹیشن, Sindhi: غلام آباد ريلوي اسٽيشن) is located in Pakistan.

== See also ==
- List of railway stations in Pakistan
- Pakistan Railways
