= Dhandi railway station =

Railway station in Pakistan

Dhandi Railway Station

General information
- Owner: Ministry of Railways
- Tracks: Dhandi Road Kot Sabzal
- Connections: Closed

Other information
- Station code: DDI

History
- Former names: Sardar Muhammad Salleh Khan Juna
Location

Dhandi Railway Station (Urdu: دھانڈی ریلوے اسٹیشن) is located in Pakistan.

== See also ==
- List of railway stations in Pakistan
- Pakistan Railways
