= Balochpur railway station =

Railway station in Pakistan

Balochpur railway station بلوچ پور ریلوے اسٹیشن

General information
- Coordinates: 26°31′14″N 68°18′28″E
- Owner: Ministry of Railways

Other information
- Station code: BLOR

History
- Former names: Great Indian Peninsula Railway
Location

The Balochpur railway station (Urdu: بلوچ پور ریلوے اسٹیشن) is located in Pakistan.

== See also ==
- List of railway stations in Pakistan
- Pakistan Railways
