= P.A.F. Halt railway station =

Railway station in Pakistan

General information
- Coordinates: 24°52′59″N 67°06′57″E
- Owner: Ministry of Railways

Other information
- Station code: AFH
Location

P.A.F. Halt railway station (Urdu: پی اے ایف ہالٹ ریلوے اسٹیشن) is located in Pakistan.

== See also ==
- List of railway stations in Pakistan
- Pakistan Railways
