= Mirdad Muafi railway station =

Railway station in Pakistan

Coordinates: 30°38′N 73°00′E

Mirdad Muafi Railway Station

General information
- Owner: Ministry of Railways

Other information
- Station code: MQD

History
- Former names: Great Indian Peninsula Railway
Location

Mirdad Muafi Railway Station (Urdu: میرداد موافی ریلوے اسٹیشن) is located in the Sahiwal District, Pakistan.

== See also ==
- List of railway stations in Pakistan
- Pakistan Railways
