= Peshawar Cantonment railway station =

Railway station in Pakistan

Peshawar Cantonment Station پشاور چھاؤنی ریلوے اسٹیشن
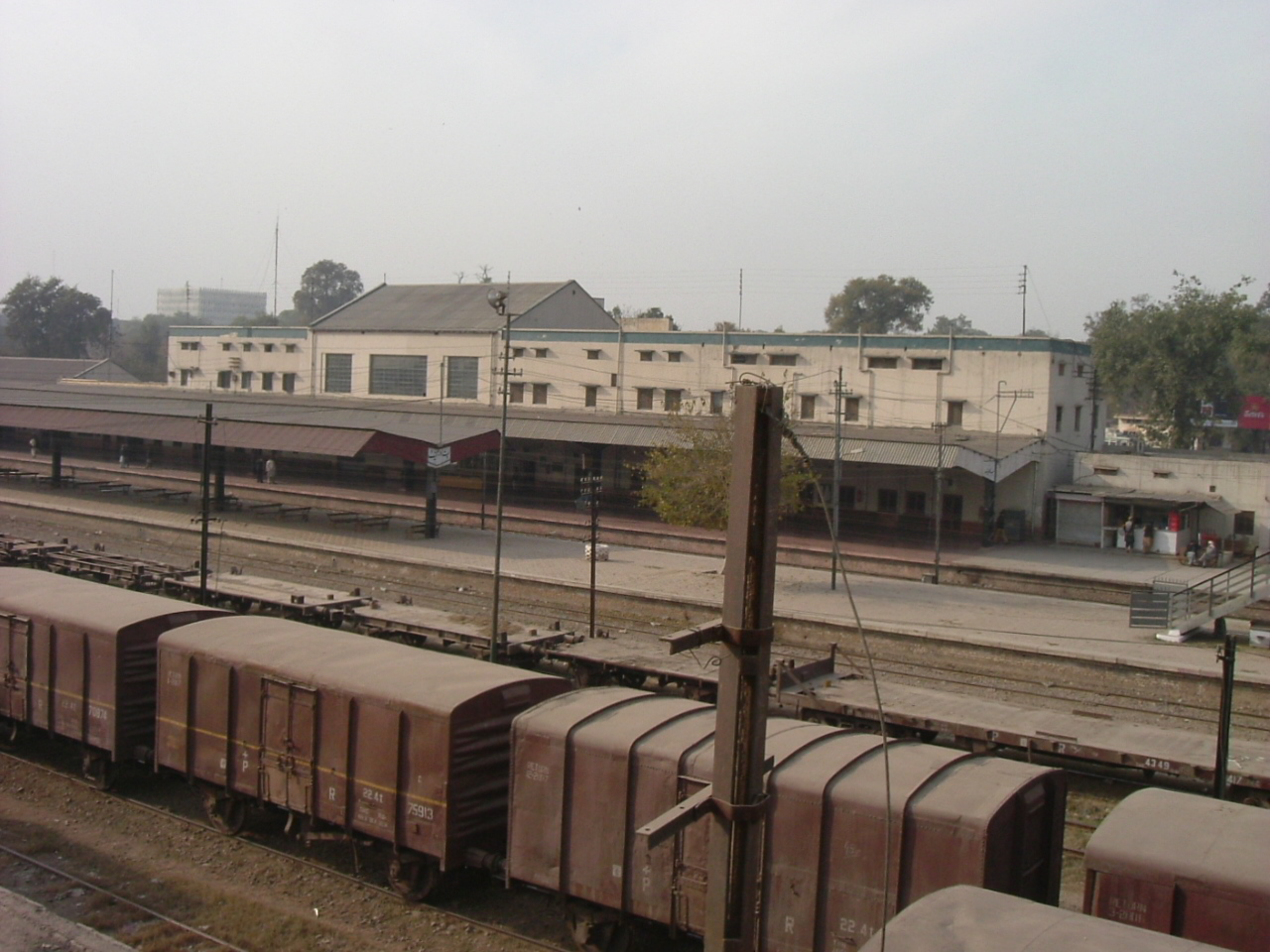

General information
- Location: Saddar Road, Peshawar, Khyber Pakhtunkhwa 25000; Pakistan
- Coordinates: 34.0023°N 71.5501°E
- Elevation: 339.5 metres (1,114 ft)
- System: Pakistan Railways Station
- Owner: Ministry of Railways
- Lines: Karachi–Peshawar Line; Khyber Pass Railway; Peshawar Circular Railway
- Platforms: 3
- Tracks: 7
- Connections: Peshawar BRT – Line 1

Construction
- Structure type: Standard (on ground station)
- Parking: Available
- Accessible: Available

Other information
- Status: Functional
- Station code: PSC
- Fare zone: Pakistan Railways Peshawar Zone

History
- Opened: 1898; 128 years ago

Services
Preceding station	Pakistan Railways	Following station
Peshawar City towards Kiamari	Karachi–Peshawar Line	Terminus
Peshawar City Terminus	Khyber Pass Railway (defunct)	Jamrud Junction towards Landi Khana
Preceding station	Peshawar Circular Railway	Following station
Charsadda towards Nowshera Junction	(proposed)	Peshawar City towards Charsadda
- Computerized Ticketing Counters Luggage Checking System Parking Disabled Access Food Plaza Kiosks WC Taxi Stand Public Transportation Metro interchange
Location

Peshawar Cantonment Railway Station (Urdu: پشاور چھاؤنی ریلوے اسٹیشن, Pashto: د پېښور اردوگاه اورګاډي سټيشن) (often abbreviated as Peshawar Cantt) is the principal railway station in Peshawar, in the Khyber Pakhtunkhwa province of Pakistan. It is located on Saddar Road. The station is staffed and has a booking office.

== Facilities ==
The station is on the Karachi–Peshawar Railway Line. Peshawar Cantonment station will be connected to the future TransPeshawar BRT – Line 1.

== Platforms ==
There are three platforms and seven tracks. The platforms are connected by foot overbridge.

== Services ==
The following trains originate at Peshawar Cantonment station:

TRAIN NUMBER	TRAIN NAME	DESTINATION
40 DN	JAFFER EXPRESS	QUETTA
14 DN	AWAM EXPRESS	KARACHI CANTT
48 DN	REHMAN BABA EXPRESS	KARACHI CANTT
20 DN	KHUSHAL KHAN KHATTAK EXPRESS	KARACHI CITY
02 DN	KHYBER MAIL EXPRESS	KARACHI CANTT

== See also ==
- Peshawar
- Khyber Pakhtunkhwa
- Pakistan Railways
- List of railway stations in Pakistan
- Khyber Pass Railway
