= Kiamari Railway Station =

Train station in Pakistan

Coordinates: 24°49′N 66°59′E

Kiamari Railway Station کیماڑی ریلوے اسٹیشن

General information
- Owner: Ministry of Railways
- Line: Karachi–Peshawar Railway Line

Other information
- Station code: KMR

History
- Opened: 1889

Services
Preceding station	Pakistan Railways	Following station
Terminus	Karachi–Peshawar Line	Karachi City towards Peshawar Cantonment
Location

Kiamari Railway Station (Urdu: کیماڑی ریلوے اسٹیشن, Sindhi: ڪياماڙي ريلوي اسٽيشن) is located in Kiamari Town, Karachi, Sindh, Pakistan.

== See also ==
- List of railway stations in Pakistan
- Pakistan Railways
