= Chaman Passenger =

Pakistani train

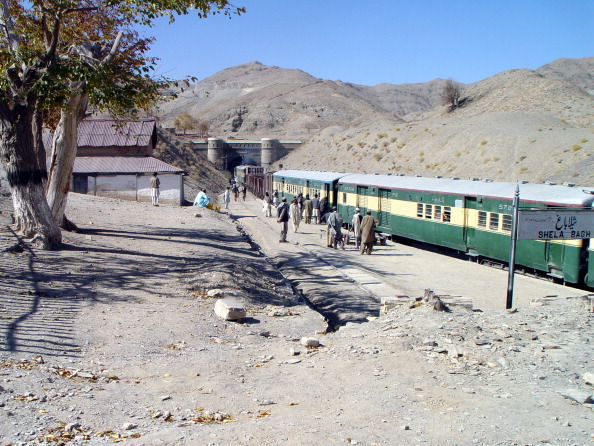
- Chaman Passenger train entering Khojak Tunnel

Overview
- Service type: Inter-city rail
- First service: 1958
- Current operator: Pakistan Railways

Route
- Termini: Quetta; Chaman
- Stops: 10
- Distance travelled: 142 kilometres (88 mi)
- Average journey time: 4 hours, 30 minutes
- Service frequency: Daily
- Train numbers: 221UP (Quetta→Chaman); 222DN (Chaman→Quetta)

On-board services
- Class: Economy
- Sleeping arrangements: Not Available
- Catering facilities: Not Available

Technical
- Track gauge: 1,676 mm (5 ft 6 in)
- Track owner: Pakistan Railways

Chaman Passenger is a passenger train operated daily by Pakistan Railways between Quetta and Chaman in Balochistan, Pakistan. The trip takes approximately 4 hours and 45 minutes to cover a published distance of 130 kilometres (81 mi), traveling along a stretch of the Rohri–Chaman Railway Line.

== Route ==
- Quetta to Chaman via Rohri–Chaman Railway Line

== Station stops ==
- Quetta
- Sheikh Mandah
- Beleli
- Kuchlak
- Bostan
- Yaru
- Gulistan
- Saranan Halt
- Qilla Abdullah
- Shela Bagh
- Chaman

== Equipment ==
Chaman Mixed only offers economy class seating.
