= Rehman Baba Express =

Pakistani passenger train

Overview
- Service type: Inter-city rail
- First service: 23 December 2018
- Current operator: Pakistan Railways

Route
- Termini: Karachi Cantonment; Peshawar Cantonment
- Stops: 26
- Distance travelled: 1,491 kilometres (926 mi)
- Average journey time: 27 hours, 50 minutes
- Service frequency: Daily
- Train numbers: 47UP (Karachi→Peshawar); 48DN (Peshawar→Karachi)

On-board services
- Classes: AC Business; AC Standard; Economy
- Sleeping arrangements: Available
- Catering facilities: Available

Technical
- Track gauge: 1,676 mm (5 ft 6 in)
- Track owner: Pakistan Railways

Rehman Baba Express (Urdu: رحمان بابا ایکسپریس) is a passenger train operated daily by Pakistan Railways between Karachi and Peshawar. The trip takes approximately 27 hours and 50 minutes, to cover a published distance of 1,491 kilometres (926 mi), traveling along the entire stretch of the Karachi–Peshawar Railway Line and Khanewal–Wazirabad Branch Line. The train named after the Rehman Baba, who was a Sufi Dervish and poet. The train was inaugurated on 23 December 2018 by former Minister for Railways Sheikh Rasheed Ahmad at Peshawar Cantonment railway station. Train was outsourced to PRACS on January 1 2023, in September 2023, PRACS refused to run Rehman Baba Express.

== Route ==
- Karachi Cantonment–Khanewal Junction via Karachi–Peshawar Railway Line
- Khanewal Junction–Wazirabad Junction via Khanewal–Wazirabad Branch Line
- Wazirabad Junction–Peshawar Cantonment via Karachi–Peshawar Railway Line

== Accommodation ==
AC Business
AC Standard
Economy

== Stops ==
- Karachi Cantonment
- Landhi Junction
- Hyderabad Junction
- Tando Adam Junction
- Nawabshah Junction
- Bhiria Road
- Mehrabpur Junction
- Rohri Junction
- Pano Akil
- Rahim Yar Khan
- Bahawalpur
- Multan Cantonment
- Khanewal Junction
- Toba Tek Singh
- Faisalabad
- Sangla Hill Junction
- Hafizabad
- Alipur Chatta
- Wazirabad Junction
- Lala Musa Junction
- Rawalpindi
- Attock Junction
- Jahangira Road
- Nowshera
- Peshawar Cantonment
