= Jaffar Express =

Pakistani passenger train

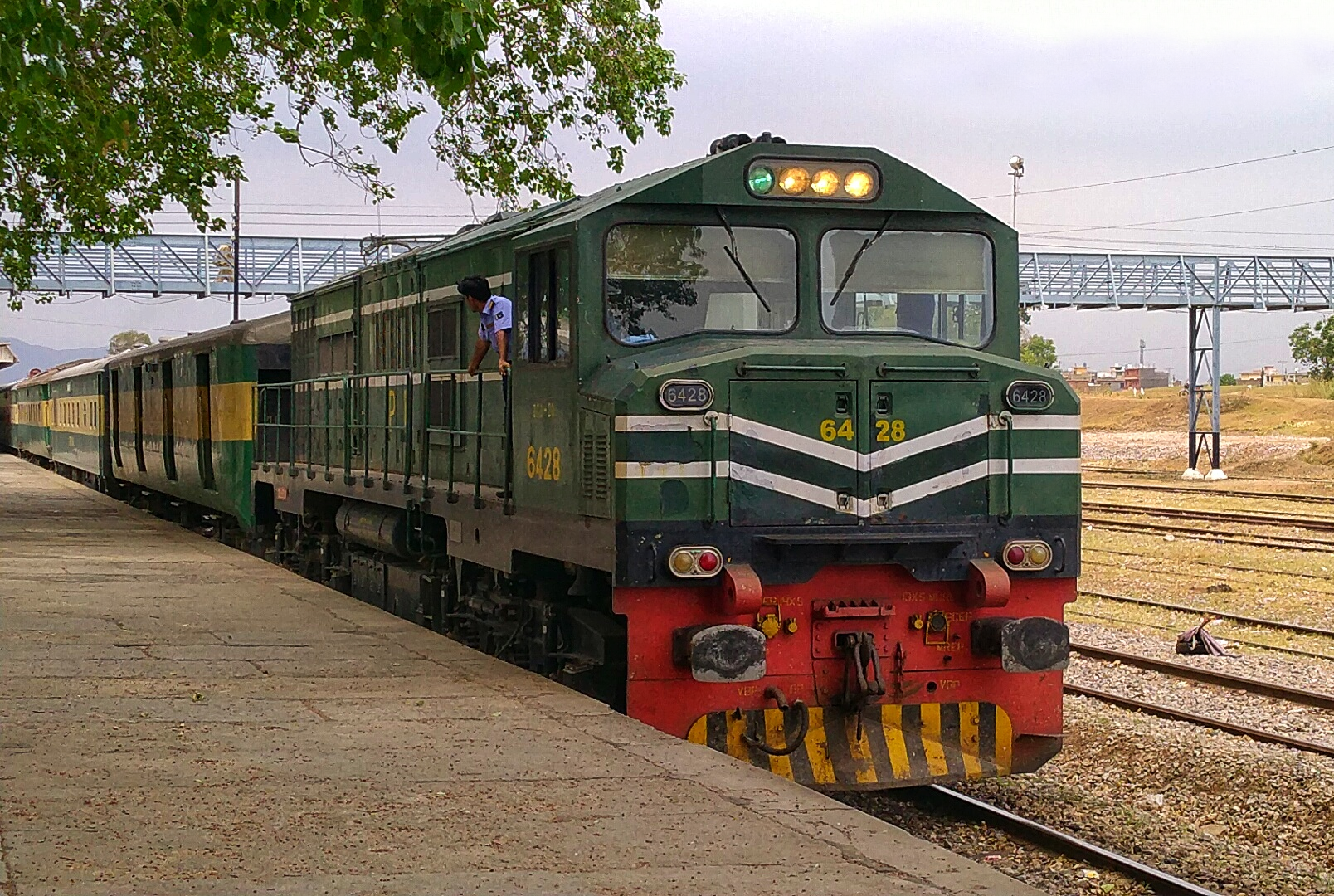
- The Jaffar Express at Attock City Junction railway station

Overview
- Service type: Inter-city rail
- Status: Operational
- Locale: Quetta
- First service: 16 April 2003
- Current operator: Pakistan Railways

Route
- Termini: Quetta; Peshawar
- Stops: 37
- Distance travelled: 1,632 kilometres (1,014 mi)
- Average journey time: 35 hours, 10 minutes
- Service frequency: Daily
- Train number: 39UP 40Dn (Quetta→Peshawar) (Peshawar→Quetta)

On-board services
- Classes: Economy Class; AC Standard; AC Business; AC Sleeper
- Seating arrangements: Available
- Sleeping arrangements: Available

Technical
- Track gauge: 1,676 mm (5 ft 6 in)
- Operating speed: 110 km/h
- Track owner: Pakistan Railways
Route map
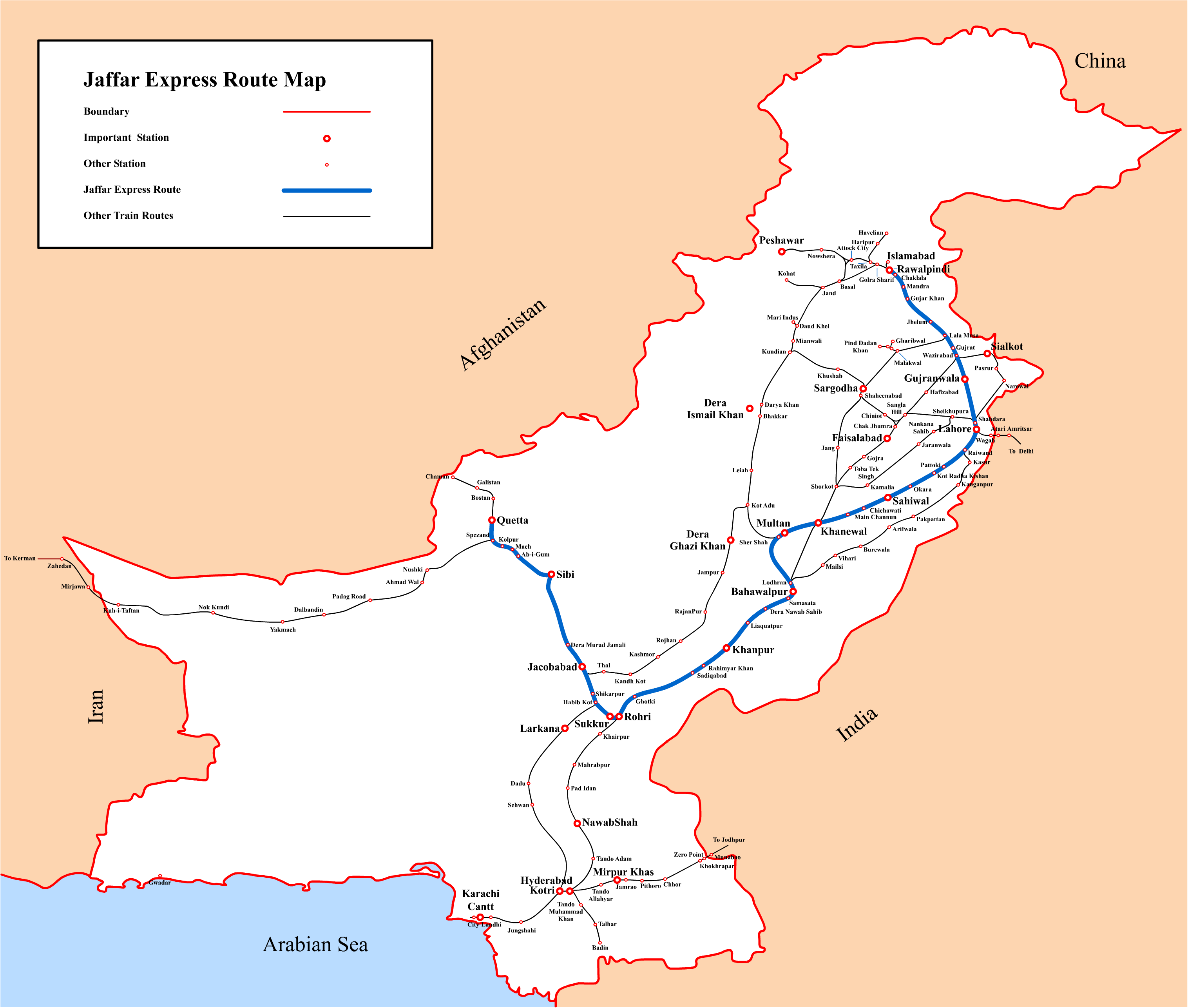

Jaffar Express (Urdu: جعفر ایکسپریس) is a passenger train operated daily by Pakistan Railways between Quetta and Peshawar. The trip takes approximately 34 hours, 10 minutes to cover a published distance of 1,632 kilometres (1,014 mi), traveling along a stretch of the Rohri–Chaman Railway Line and Karachi–Peshawar Railway Line.

== History ==
The Jaffar Express is named after Mir Jaffar Khan Jamali, who was a prominent Baloch tribal leader, active member of the Pakistan Movement, and a close friend of the Mohammad Ali Jinnah. He was the uncle of former Prime Minister Mir Zafarullah Khan Jamali. The train was inaugurated by the Prime Minister Mir Zafarullah Khan Jamali on 16 April 2003 with Chinese rakes. The original Jaffar Express ran between Quetta and Rawalpindi. In April 2017, the train was extended to Peshawar.

=== 2025 hijacking ===
On 11 March 2025, the Jaffar Express passenger train traveling from Quetta to Peshawar in Pakistan was hijacked by the Balochistan Liberation Army, with over 440 people taken hostage. The BLA claims it killed more than 30 Pakistan Army personnel. On 12 March security forces rescued all passengers and security personnel by the Balochistan Liberation Army (BLA). The Pakistan Army confirmed the deaths of all 33 BLA militants, as well as 21 passengers, 4 soldiers and the train driver.

In November 2025, the train was targeted again when unidentified attackers had planted an explosive device on the railway track in the Shaheed Abdul Aziz Bullo area on a route between Peshawar and Quetta.

== Route ==
- Quetta–Rohri Junction via Rohri–Chaman Railway Line
- Rohri Junction–Peshawar Cantonment via Karachi–Peshawar Railway Line

== Station stops ==
- Quetta
- Kolpur
- Mach
- Aab-e-Gum
- Sibi
- Bakhtiarabad Domki
- Dera Murad Jamali
- Dera Allah Yar
- Jacobabad Junction
- Shikarpur
- Sukkur
- Rohri Junction
- Pano Akil
- Ghotki
- Sadiqabad
- Rahim Yar Khan
- Khanpur
- Bahawalpur
- Multan Cantonment
- Khanewal Junction
- Mian Channun
- Chichawatni
- Sahiwal
- Okara
- Pattoki
- Raiwind Junction
- Kot Lakhpat
- Lahore Cantonment
- Lahore Junction
- Gujranwala
- Wazirabad Junction
- Gujrat
- Lala Musa Junction
- Jhelum
- Rawalpindi
- Attock City Junction
- Nowshera Junction
- Peshawar City
- Peshawar Cantonment

== Equipment ==
The train has Economy Class, AC Standard, AC Business and AC Sleeper accommodations.

== See also ==
- 2025 Jaffar Express hijacking
