= Khyber Mail (passenger train) =

Pakistani passenger train

Overview
- Service type: Inter-city rail
- First service: 12 February 1920
- Current operator(s): Pakistan Railways

Route
- Termini: Karachi Cantonment; Peshawar Cantonment
- Stops: 41
- Distance travelled: 1,732 kilometres (1,076 mi)
- Average journey time: 32 hours, 00 minutes
- Service frequency: Daily
- Train number(s): 1UP (Karachi→Peshawar); 2DN (Peshawar→Karachi)

On-board services
- Class(es): AC Sleeper; AC Business; AC Standard; Economy Class
- Sleeping arrangements: Available
- Catering facilities: Available

Technical
- Track gauge: 1,676 mm (5 ft 6 in)
- Operating speed: 55 km/h (34 mph)
- Track owner(s): Pakistan Railways
Route map
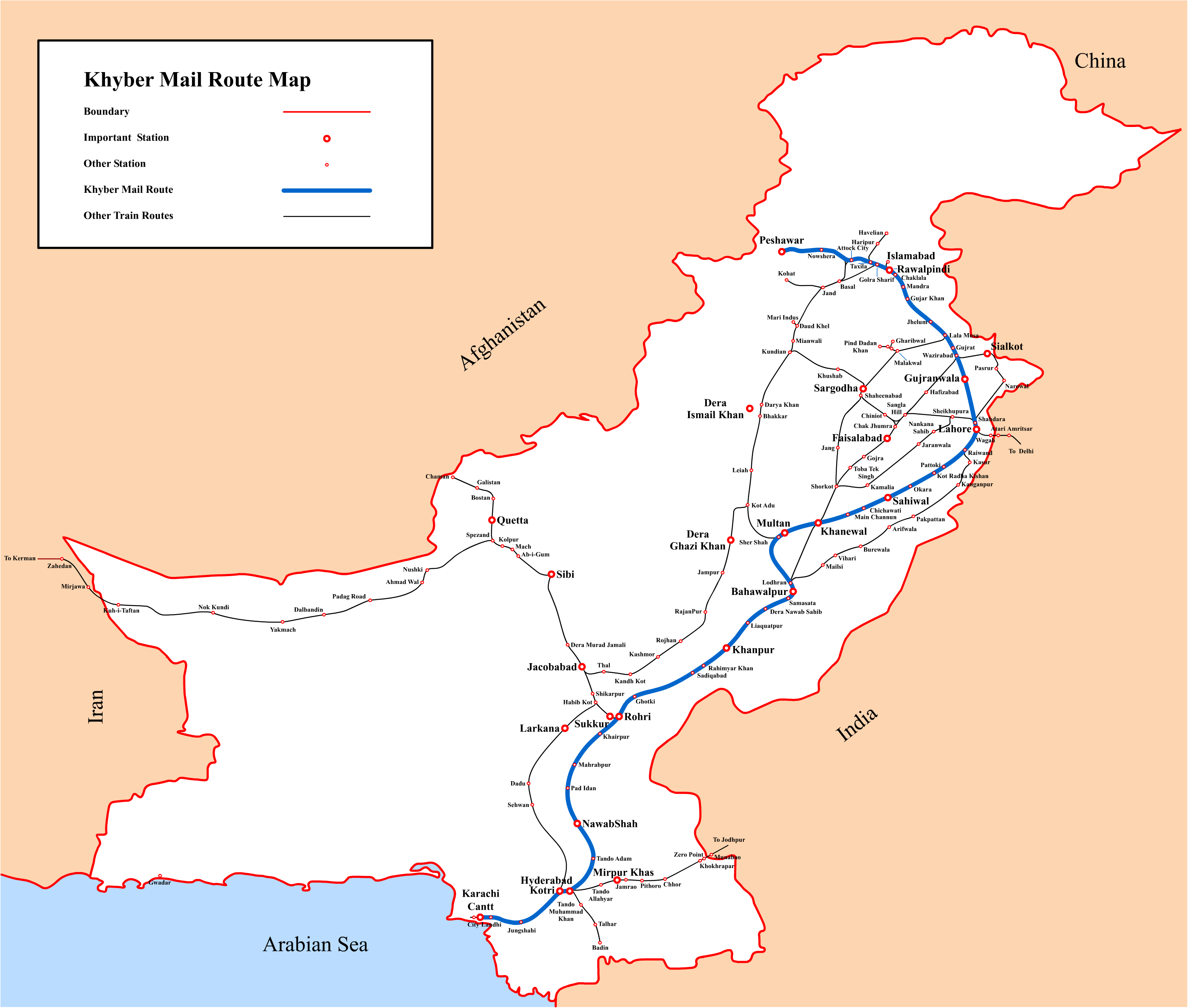
- Khyber Mail route map

Khyber Mail (Urdu: خیبر میل) is a passenger train operated daily by Pakistan Railways between Karachi and Peshawar. The trip takes approximately 32 hours, to cover a published distance of 1,732 kilometres (1,076 mi), traveling along the entire stretch of the Karachi–Peshawar Railway Line.

The train named after the famous Khyber Pass, located in the province of Khyber Pakhtunkhwa.

== History ==
The Khyber Mail is one of Pakistan's oldest and most prestigious passenger trains that has been continuously running since 12 February 1920.

In 2018, 50 coaches were upgraded with modern equipment.

The Train has completed its 100 years of Service on February 12, 2020.

A premium lounge dining car was added in 2024.

== Route ==
- Karachi Cantonment–Peshawar Cantonment via Karachi–Peshawar Railway Line

The Train departs Karachi Cantonment at 22:00 every night, Lahore Junction arrival next night 19:45 & departure 20:20. The train reaches Peshawar Cantonment at 06:00 on 3rd morning. Return timings is also same in Peshawar Cantonment to Karachi Cantonment journey. The train departs Peshawar Cantonment at 22:00, Lahore Junction arrival next morning 07:40 & departure 08:15. The train reaches Karachi Cantonment at 06:00 on 3rd morning.

== Station stops ==
- Karachi Cantonment
- Drigh Road
- Landhi
- Hyderabad Junction
- Nawabshah
- Khairpur
- Rohri Junction
- Pano Akil
- Ghotki
- Mirpur Mathelo
- Daharki
- Sadikabad
- Rahim Yar Khan
- Khanpur Junction
- Liaquatpur
- Dera Nawab Sahib
- Samasata Junction
- Bahawalpur
- Lodhran Junction
- Shujabad
- Multan Cantonment
- Khanewal Junction
- Mian Channun
- Chichawatni
- Sahiwal
- Okara
- Pattoki
- Kot Radha Kishn
- Raiwind Junction
- Kot Lakhpat
- Lahore Cantonment
- Lahore Junction
- Gujranwala
- Wazirabad Junction
- Gujrat
- Lala Musa Junction
- Jhelum
- Rawalpindi
- Attock City Junction
- Jhangira Road
- Nowshera Junction
- Peshawar City
- Peshawar Cantonment

== Equipment ==
The train has AC Business, AC Sleeper and Economy Class accommodations.

== Incidents ==
On Jun 8, 1998, 23 people were killed as a bomb exploded on moving Khyber Mail heading towards Peshawar, on Tando Masti Khan railway station.

On Aug 30, 2011, Karachi-bound Khyber Mail ran into a stationary passenger train nearly two kilometres from the Badami Bagh Railway Station in Lahore. Resulting 3 died 18 injured.
