= Allama Iqbal Express =

Pakistani express train

Overview
- Service type: Inter-city rail, Mail express
- Predecessor: Shaheen Express
- First service: 1940
- Current operator: Pakistan Railways

Route
- Termini: Karachi Cantonment; Sialkot Junction
- Stops: 36
- Distance travelled: 1,362 kilometres (846 mi)
- Average journey time: 25 hours
- Service frequency: Daily
- Train numbers: 9UP (Karachi→Sialkot); 10DN (Sialkot→Karachi)

On-board services
- Classes: Economy Class , AC Standard
- Sleeping arrangements: Not Available
- Catering facilities: Not available

Technical
- Track gauge: 1,676 mm (5 ft 6 in)
- Track owner: Pakistan Railways
Route map
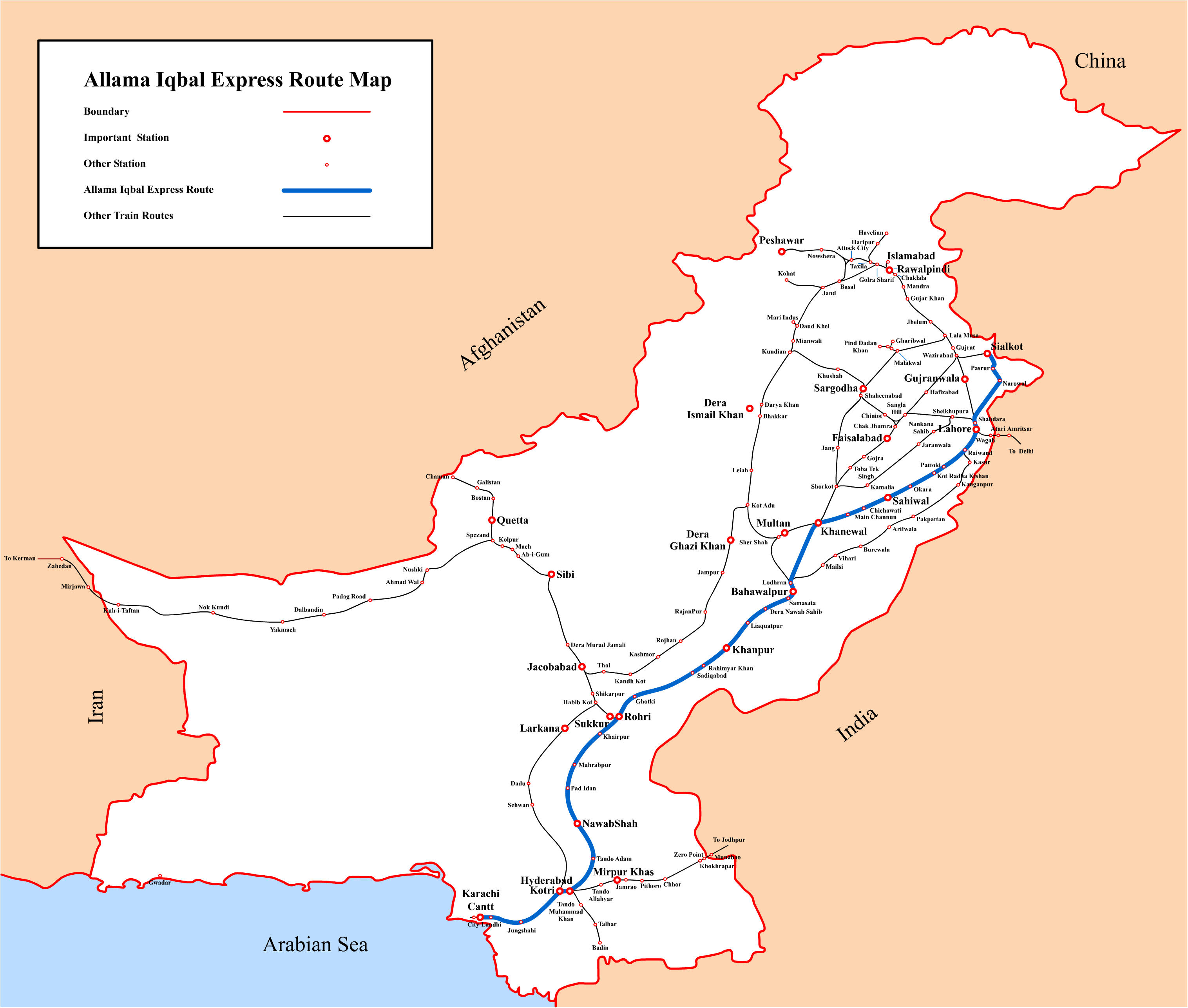
- Allama Iqbal Express route map

The Allama Iqbal Express (Urdu: علامہ اقبال ایکسپریس) is a passenger train operated daily by Pakistan Railways between Karachi and Sialkot, two important industrial hubs of Pakistan. The trip takes approximately 25 hours and 30 minutes to cover a published distance of 1,362 kilometres (846 mi), traveling along the Karachi–Peshawar Railway Line, Shahdara Bagh–Chak Amru Branch Line and Wazirabad–Narowal Branch Line.

== History ==
The Allama Iqbal Express is one of the oldest express trains of Pakistan, beginning in 1940 as the Shaheen Express from Karachi to Sialkot via Faisalabad. In 1985, Shaheen Express was renamed to Allama Iqbal Express, in honor of Pakistan's famous poet Dr. Muhammad Iqbal, who was born in Sialkot.

== Route ==
In 1998, the Allama Iqbal Express was redirected via Wazirabad Junction to Sialkot Junction. In 2004, it was again redirected to the current route via Narowal Junction.

- Karachi Cantonment–Shahdara Bagh Junction via Karachi–Peshawar Railway Line
- Shahdara Bagh Junction–Narowal Junction via Shahdara Bagh–Chak Amru Branch Line
- Narowal Junction–Sialkot Junction via Wazirabad–Narowal Branch Line

== Station stops ==
- Karachi Cantonment
- Drigh Road
- Landhi
- Kotri Junction
- Hyderabad Junction
- Tando Adam Junction
- Nawabshah
- Bhiria Road
- Mahrabpur Junction
- Gambat
- Rohri Junction
- Ghotki
- Sadiqabad
- Rahim Yar Khan
- Khanpur Junction
- Dera Nawab Sahib
- Bahawalpur
- Lodhran Junction
- Dunyapur
- Jahanian
- Khanewal Junction
- Mian Channun
- Chichawatni
- Sahiwal
- Okara
- Pattoki
- Kot Radha Kishn
- Raiwind Junction
- Kot Lakhpat
- Lahore Junction
- Shahdara Bagh Junction
- Narang
- Baddomalhi
- Narowal Junction
- Qila Sobha Singh
- Pasrur
- Chawinda
- Sialkot Junction

== Equipment ==
Allama Iqbal Express consists of 16 coaches (all economy class accommodation), one power van one AC standard and one luggage van.

1	2	3	4	5	6	7	8	9	10	11	12	13	14	15	16	17	18
Power Van	Economy	Economy	Economy	Economy	Economy	AC Standard	Economy	Economy	Economy	Economy	Economy	Economy	Economy	Economy	Economy	Economy	Luggage Van

== Incidents ==
On Nov 3, 2009, this train collided head-on with a goods train in Karachi. Resulting 18 dead and 45 injured.

== See also ==
- Pakistan Railways
