= New Chhor railway station =

Railway station in Sindh, Pakistan

New Chhor Railway Station نیا چھوڑ ریلوے اسٹیشن نئون ڇور ريلوي اسٽيشن

General information
- Owner: Ministry of Railways
- Line: Hyderabad–Khokhrapar Branch Line

Other information
- Station code: NCO

Services
| Preceding station | Pakistan Railways | Following station |
|---|---|---|
| Chhor towards Kotri Junction | Hyderabad–Khokhrapar Branch Line | Khokhropar towards Zero Point |
Location

New Chhor Railway Station (Urdu: نیا چھوڑ ریلوے اسٹیشن, Sindhi: نئون ڇور ريلوي اسٽيشن) is located in Sindh, Pakistan.

== See also ==
- List of railway stations in Pakistan
- Pakistan Railways
