= Nautheh railway station =

Railway station in Punjab, Pakistan

Nautheh Railway Station نوتہیہ ریلوے اسٹیشن

General information
- Owner: Ministry of Railways

Other information
- Station code: NUT

Services
Preceding station	Pakistan Railways	Following station
Sukheke towards Khanewal Junction	Khanewal–Wazirabad Branch Line	Kaleke towards Wazirabad Junction
Location

Nautheh Railway Station (Urdu: نوتہیہ ریلوے اسٹیشن) is located in Nautheh village, Hafizabad district of Punjab province of the Pakistan.

== See also ==
- List of railway stations in Pakistan
- Pakistan Railways
