= JLU =

JLU may refer to:

- Jagran Lakecity University, in Bhopal, Madhya Pradesh, India
- Jalu-Jo-Chunrd railway station, in Pakistan
- Jilin University, in China
- Justice League United, a superhero team from DC Comics
- Justice League Unlimited, an American television series
- Justus Liebig University of Giessen, in Hesse, Germany
