= Hirok railway station =

Railway station in Pakistan

Coordinates: 29.929721°N 67.226578°E

Hirok Railway Station ہیروک ریلوے اسٹیشن

General information
- Owner: Ministry of Railways
- Line: Rohri-Chaman Railway Line

Other information
- Station code: HRK

Services
| Preceding station | Pakistan Railways | Following station |
|---|---|---|
| Mach towards Rohri Junction | Rohri–Chaman Line | Dozan towards Chaman |
Location

Hirok Railway Station (Urdu: ہیروک ریلوے اسٹیشن, Balochi: ہیروک ریلوے اسٹیشن) is located in Hirok village, Kachhi district of Balochistan province of the Pakistan. Hirok is the only 'A' class station of Pakistan.

== See also ==
- List of railway stations in Pakistan
- Pakistan Railways
