= Dabanwala railway station =

Railway station in Punjab, Pakistan

Dabanwala Railway Station ڈبانوالہ ریلوے اسٹیشن

General information
- Coordinates: 30.9180°N 72.4155°E
- Owner: Ministry of Railways
- Line: Khanewal–Wazirabad Branch Line

Other information
- Station code: DBX

Services
Preceding station	Pakistan Railways	Following station
Chutiana towards Khanewal Junction	Khanewal–Wazirabad Branch Line	Toba Tek Singh towards Wazirabad Junction
Location

Dabanwala Railway Station or Daban Wala Railway Station (Urdu and Punjabi: ڈبانوالہ ریلوے اسٹیشن) is located in Dabanwala village, Toba Tek Singh district of Punjab province, Pakistan.

== See also ==
- List of railway stations in Pakistan
- Pakistan Railways
