= Chhor railway station =

Railway station in Pakistan

Chhor Railway Station چھور ریلوے اسٹیشن ڇور ريلوي اسٽيشن

General information
- Coordinates: 25.5188°N 69.7720°E
- Owner: Ministry of Railways
- Line: Hyderabad–Khokhrapar Branch Line

Other information
- Station code: COH

History
- Opened: 1936

Services
Preceding station	Pakistan Railways	Following station
Pithoro Junction towards Kotri Junction	Hyderabad–Khokhrapar Branch Line	Khokhropar towards Zero Point
Location
- Location within Pakistan Location within Sindh

Chhor Railway Station (Urdu: چھور ریلوے اسٹیشن, Sindhi: ڇور ريلوي اسٽيشن) is located in Pakistan.

== See also ==
- List of railway stations in Pakistan
- Pakistan Railways
