= MJI =

MJI or mji may refer to:

- Michigan Jewish Institute, a defunct Jewish educational institution in the Metro Detroit, Michigan area
- MJI, the IATA code for Mitiga International Airport, Tripoli, Libya
- MJI, the station code for Madeji Road railway station, Pakistan
- mji, the ISO 639-3 code for Kim Mun language
