= Kaleke railway station =

Railway station in Punjab, Pakistan

Kaleke Railway Station کالیکے ریلوے اسٹیشن

General information
- Owner: Ministry of Railways
- Line: Khanewal–Wazirabad Branch Line

Other information
- Station code: KKE

Services
Preceding station	Pakistan Railways	Following station
Nautheh towards Khanewal Junction	Khanewal–Wazirabad Branch Line	Hafizabad towards Wazirabad Junction
Location

Kaleke Railway Station (Urdu: کالیکے ریلوے اسٹیشن) is located in Kaleke City, Hafizabad district of Punjab province, Pakistan.

== See also ==
- List of railway stations in Pakistan
- Pakistan Railways
