= Yaru railway station =

Railway station in Pakistan

Yaru Railway Station یارو ریلوے اسٹیشن

General information
- Location: Yaru village, Pishin district, Balochistan; Pakistan
- Coordinates: 30.5021°N 66.9533°E
- Owner: Ministry of Railways
- Line: Rohri-Chaman Railway Line

Other information
- Station code: ZKZ

Services
Preceding station	Pakistan Railways	Following station
Bostan towards Rohri Junction	Rohri–Chaman Line	Gulistan towards Chaman
Location

Yaru Railway Station (Urdu: یارو ریلوے اسٹیشن, Balochi: یارو ریلوے اسٹیشن) is located in Yaru village, Pishin district of Balochistan province of the Pakistan.

== See also ==
- List of railway stations in Pakistan
- Pakistan Railways
