= Kuchlak railway station =

Railway station in Pakistan

Kuchlak Railway Station کچلاک ریلوے اسٹیشن

General information
- Coordinates: 30.3541°N 66.9496°E
- Owner: Ministry of Railways
- Line: Rohri-Chaman railway line

Other information
- Station code: KCK

Services
| Preceding station | Pakistan Railways | Following station |
|---|---|---|
| Beleli towards Rohri Junction | Rohri–Chaman Line | Bostan towards Chaman |
Location

Kuchlak Railway Station (Urdu: کچلاک ریلوے اسٹیشن, Balochi: کچلاک ریلوے اسٹیشن) is located in Kuchlak town, Quetta district of Balochistan province of the Pakistan.

== See also ==
- List of railway stations in Pakistan
- Pakistan Railways
