= Sultanabad railway station =

Railway station in Pakistan

Sultanabad Railway Station سلطان آباد ریلوے اسٹیشن سلطان آباد ريلوي اسٽيشن

General information
- Coordinates: 25.5037°N 68.8843°E
- Owner: Ministry of Railways

Other information
- Station code: SULB

Services
Preceding station	Pakistan Railways	Following station
Tando Allahyar towards Kotri Junction	Hyderabad–Khokhrapar Branch Line	Mirpur Khas towards Zero Point
Location

Sultanabad Railway Station (Urdu: سلطان آباد ریلوے اسٹیشن, Sindhi: سلطان آباد ريلوي اسٽيشن) is located in Sultanabad, Sindh, Pakistan.

== See also ==
- List of railway stations in Pakistan
- Pakistan Railways
