= Kandiaro railway station =

Railway station in Pakistan

Coordinates: 27.059577°N 68.222806°E

Kandiaro railway station ڪنڊيارو ريلوي اسٽيشن

General information
- Owner: Ministry of Railways

Other information
- Station code: KDRO

History
- Former names: Great Indian Peninsula Railway
Location

Kandiaro railway station (Urdu: کنڈیارو ریلوے اسٹیشن, Sindhi: ڪنڊيارو ريلوي اسٽيشن) is located in Pakistan.

== See also ==
- List of railway stations in Pakistan
- Pakistan Railways
