= Khanot railway station =

Railway station in Pakistan

Coordinates: 25°45′N 68°18′E

Khanot railway station خاڻوٺ ريلوي اسٽيشن

General information
- Owner: Ministry of Railways

Other information
- Station code: KNOT

History
- Former names: Great Indian Peninsula Railway
Location

Khanot railway station (Urdu: خانوٹ ریلوے اسٹیشن, Sindhi: خاڻوٺ ريلوي اسٽيشن) is located in Pakistan.

== See also ==
- List of railway stations in Pakistan
- Pakistan Railways
