= Haripur Band railway station =

Railway station in Punjab, Pakistan

Coordinates: 32.468473°N 74.103872°E

Haripur Band Railway Station ہری پور بند ریلوے اسٹیشن
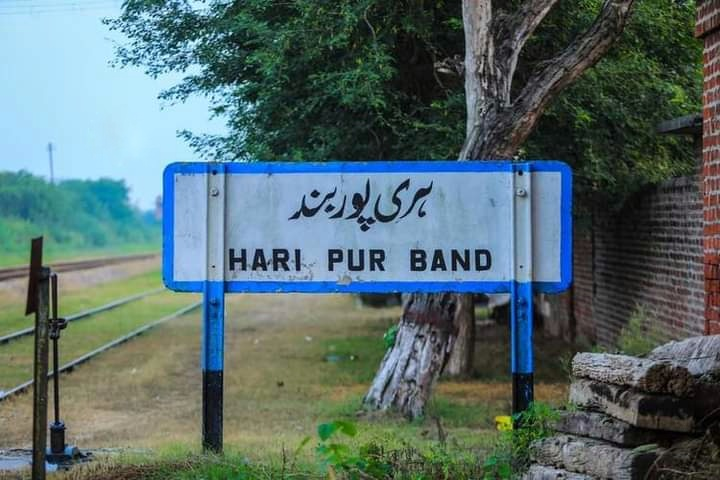

General information
- Owner: Ministry of Railways
- Line: Karachi–Peshawar Railway Line

Other information
- Station code: HPD

Services
Preceding station	Pakistan Railways	Following station
Wazirabad Junction towards Kiamari	Karachi–Peshawar Line	Gujrat towards Peshawar Cantonment
Location

Haripur Band Railway Station (Urdu and Punjabi: ہری پور بند ریلوے اسٹیشن) is located in Haripur band, Gujranwala district of Punjab province, Pakistan.

== See also ==
- List of railway stations in Pakistan
- Pakistan Railways
