= Lakha Road railway station =

Railway station in Pakistan

Lakha Road Railway Station لاکھا روڈ ریلوے اسٹیشن لاکا روڊ ريلوي اسٽيشن

General information
- Coordinates: 26.9907°N 68.3453°E
- Owner: Ministry of Railways
- Line: Karachi–Peshawar Railway Line

Other information
- Station code: LKRD

Services
Preceding station	Pakistan Railways	Following station
Bhiria Road towards Kiamari	Karachi–Peshawar Line	Mahrabpur Junction towards Peshawar Cantonment
Location

Lakha Road Railway Station (Urdu: لاکھا روڈ ریلوے اسٹیشن, Sindhi: لاکا روڊ ریلوي اسٽیشن) is located in Lakha road town, Naushahro Feroze district of Sindh province, Pakistan.

== See also ==
- List of railway stations in Pakistan
- Pakistan Railways
