= Khokhropar railway station =

Railway station in Pakistan

Khokhropar Railway Station کھوکھروپار ریلوے اسٹیشن کوکروپار ريلوي اسٽيشن

General information
- Coordinates: 25.7003°N 70.1955°E
- Owner: Ministry of Railways
- Line: Hyderabad–Khokhrapar Branch Line

Other information
- Station code: KRB

History
- Opened: 1936

Services
Preceding station	Pakistan Railways	Following station
New Chhor towards Kotri Junction	Hyderabad–Khokhrapar Branch Line	Zero Point Terminus
Location
- Location within Pakistan Location within Sindh

Khokhropar Railway Station (Urdu: کھوکھروپار ریلوے اسٹیشن, Sindhi: کوکروپار ريلوي اسٽيشن), also called Khokhrapar Railway Station, is located in Khokhrapar town, Sindh, Pakistan. This railway station, 70 km from Umerkot, was established in the late 19th century as the first railway station in Sindh on the India-Pakistan border. The valley comprises today's Sanghar, Mirpurkhas, Tharparkar and Umerkot districts. Rice and other grains were produced in huge quantity in the area. The people of Rajasthan used to travel to and from Khokhrapar railway station in a train called Raja-ji-Rail (train of Raja). It was called so because the Raja of Jodhpur and other Rajas of neighbouring princely states helped Indian Railways to lay down a 650-km meter-gauge track from Jodhpur to Hyderabad.

The train service continued even after the partition till the Indo-Pakistani War of 1965. In 1985, Mohammad Khan Junejo government planned to open the Khokhrapar border and established an immigration office at the railway station. However, the plan could not be materialized. Later, Thar Express was launched by Musharraf regime in 2006 to enable people of Pakistan to visit India through Khokhrapar border. The train had a weekly service. However, it did not halt at Khokhrapar railway station as it stopped at nearby Zero Point railway station.

As of August 9, 2019, the Thar Express has been cancelled until further notice due to escalating tensions between India and Pakistan.

== See also ==
- List of railway stations in Pakistan
- Pakistan Railways
