= Phulji railway station =

Railway station in Pakistan

General information
- Coordinates: 26.8633°N 67.7857°E
- Owner: Ministry of Railways

Other information
- Station code: PHJ

History
- Former names: Great Indian Peninsula Railway
Location

Phulji railway station (Urdu: پھلجی ریلوے اسٹیشن) is located in district Dadu Sindh Pakistan . Phulji railway station ڦلجي اسٽيشن ) is located in Pakistan.

== See also ==
- List of railway stations in Pakistan
- Pakistan Railways

ڦلجي اسٽيشن phulji railway station is situated in District Dadu Sindh Pakistan is very similar to Saeed Khans village Nabi Swabi.
