= Samiah railway station =

Railway station in Pakistan

General information
- Coordinates: 31.33012°N 70.99731°E
- Owner: Ministry of Railways

Other information
- Station code: SMTH

History
- Former names: Great Indian Peninsula Railway
Location

Samiah railway station (Urdu: سامیہ ریلوے اسٹیشن) is a railway station located in Pakistan.

== See also ==
- List of railway stations in Pakistan
- Pakistan Railways
