= Mansurwali railway station =

Railway station in Punjab, Pakistan

Coordinates: 32.381293°N 74.002011°E

Mansurwali Railway Station منصور والی ریلوے اسٹیشن

General information
- Owner: Ministry of Railways
- Line: Khanewal–Wazirabad Branch Line

Other information
- Station code: MNW

Services
Preceding station	Pakistan Railways	Following station
Jamke Chatta towards Khanewal Junction	Khanewal–Wazirabad Branch Line	Wazirabad Junction Terminus
Location

Mansurwali Railway Station (Urdu: منصور والی ریلوے اسٹیشن, Punjabi: منصور والی ریلوے اسٹیشن) is located in Mansurwali village, Gujranwala district of Punjab province of the Pakistan.

== See also ==
- List of railway stations in Pakistan
- Pakistan Railways
