= Sindh University railway station =

Railway station in Pakistan

Coordinates: 25.424311°N 68.281093°E

Sindh University railway station جامعہ سندھ ریلوے اسٹیشن سنڌ يونيورسٽي ريلوي اسٽيشن

General information
- Owner: Ministry of Railways
- Line: Kotri–Attock Railway Line

Other information
- Station code: SDUT

Services
Preceding station	Pakistan Railways	Following station
Jamshoro towards Kotri Junction	Kotri–Attock Line	Cadet Collage Petaro towards Attock City Junction
Location

Sind University railway station (Urdu: جامعہ سندھ ریلوے اسٹیشن, Sindhi: سنڌ يونيورسٽي ريلوي اسٽيشن) is located in Pakistan. This railway station is also known as Jamshoro railway station. It is located at the side of Indus Highway and opposite to University of Sindh. The station serves as a stop of passenger trains i.e. Bolan Mail and Khushhal Khan Khattak Express.

== See also ==
- List of railway stations in Pakistan
- Pakistan Railways
- Ministry of Railways
