= Kassowal railway station =

Railway station in Pakistan

Kassowal Railway Station کسووال ریلوے اسٹیشن

General information
- Coordinates: 30.4904°N 72.5364°E
- Owner: Ministry of Railways
- Line: Karachi–Peshawar Railway Line

Other information
- Station code: KSL

Services
Preceding station	Pakistan Railways	Following station
Mian Channun towards Kiamari	Karachi–Peshawar Line	Chichawatni towards Peshawar Cantonment
Location

Kassowal Railway Station (Urdu and Punjabi: کسووال ریلوے اسٹیشن)is located in Kassowal town, Sahiwal district of Punjab province of the Pakistan. It constructed in 1865.

== See also ==
- List of railway stations in Pakistan
- Pakistan Railways
