= Sangjani railway station =

Railway station in Pakistan

Sangjani Railway Station سنگجانی ریلوے اسٹیشن
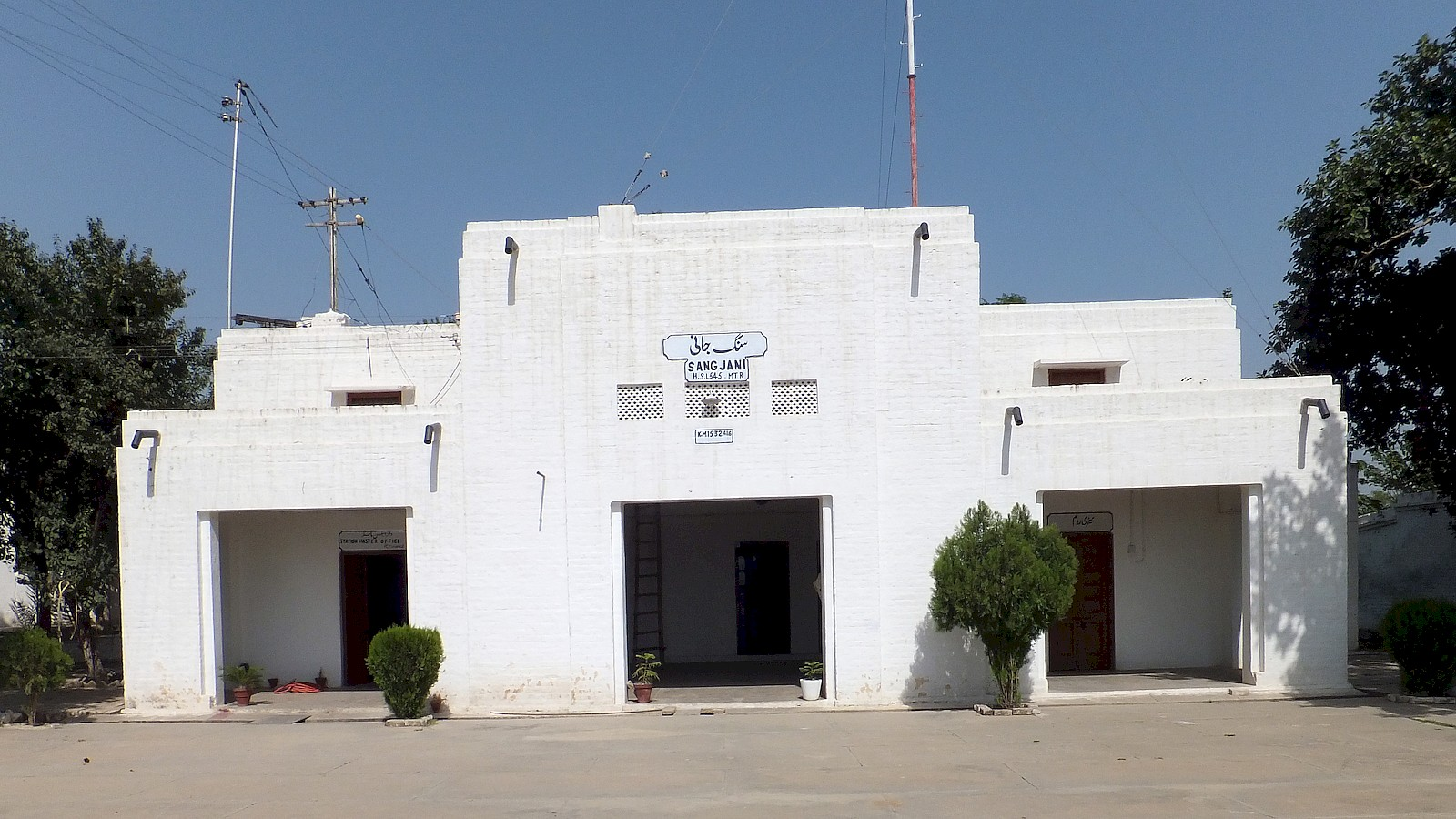

General information
- Coordinates: 33.6963°N 72.8504°E
- Owner: Ministry of Railways
- Line: Karachi–Peshawar Railway Line
- Platforms: 1

Other information
- Station code: SJI

Services
Preceding station	Pakistan Railways	Following station
Golra Sharif Junction towards Kiamari	Karachi–Peshawar Line	Taxila Cantonment towards Peshawar Cantonment
Location

Sangjani Railway Station (Urdu and Punjabi: سنگجانی ریلوے اسٹیشن) is an abandoned railway station located in Sangjani village, Islamabad Pakistan.

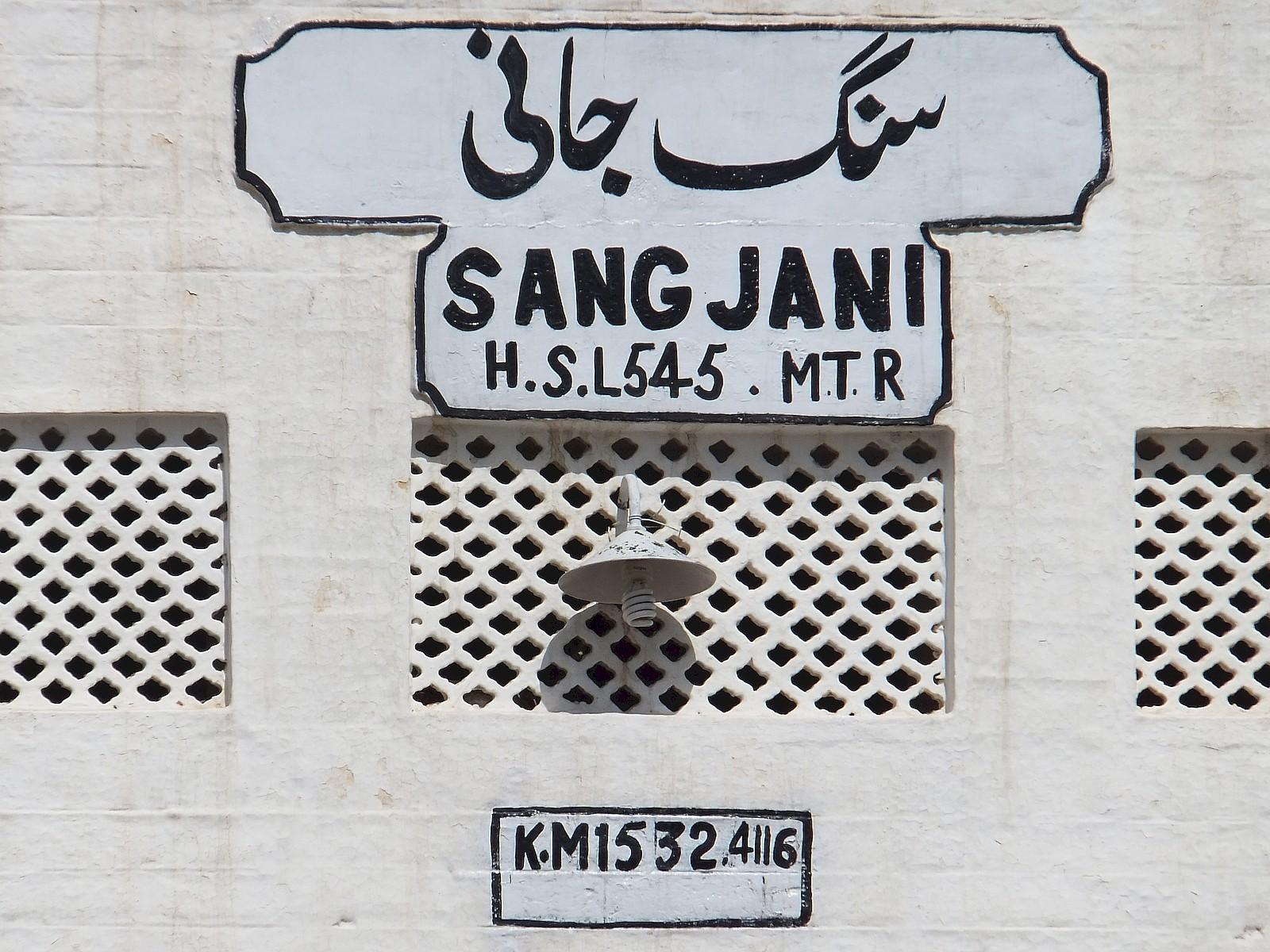
Sangjani railway station tag

== See also ==
- List of railway stations in Pakistan
- Pakistan Railways
