= Kamalia railway station =

Railway station in Pakistan

Kamalia Railway Station
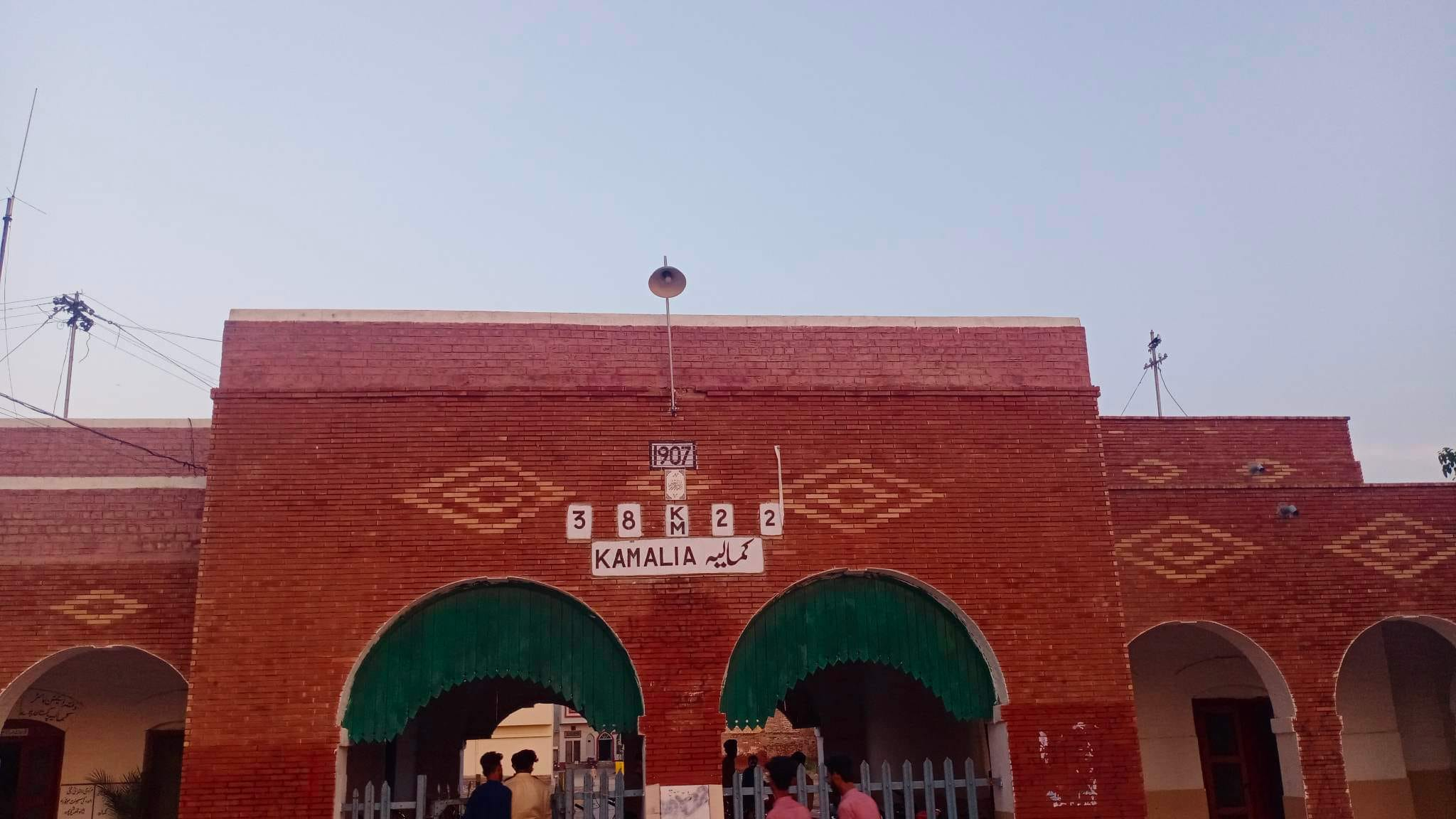

General information
- Coordinates: 30.7305°N 72.6287°E
- Owner: Ministry of Railways

Other information
- Station code: KZM

History
- Opened: 1907
- Former names: Great Indian Peninsula Railway
Location

Kamalia Railway Station (Urdu: کمالیہ ریلوے اسٹیشن) is located in Kamalia, Toba Tek Singh District, Pakistan.

== See also ==
- List of railway stations in Pakistan
- Pakistan Railways
