= Bhiria Road railway station =

Railway station in Pakistan

Bhiria Road Railway Station بھریا روڈ ریلوے اسٹیشن ڀريا روڊ ريلوي اسٽيشن
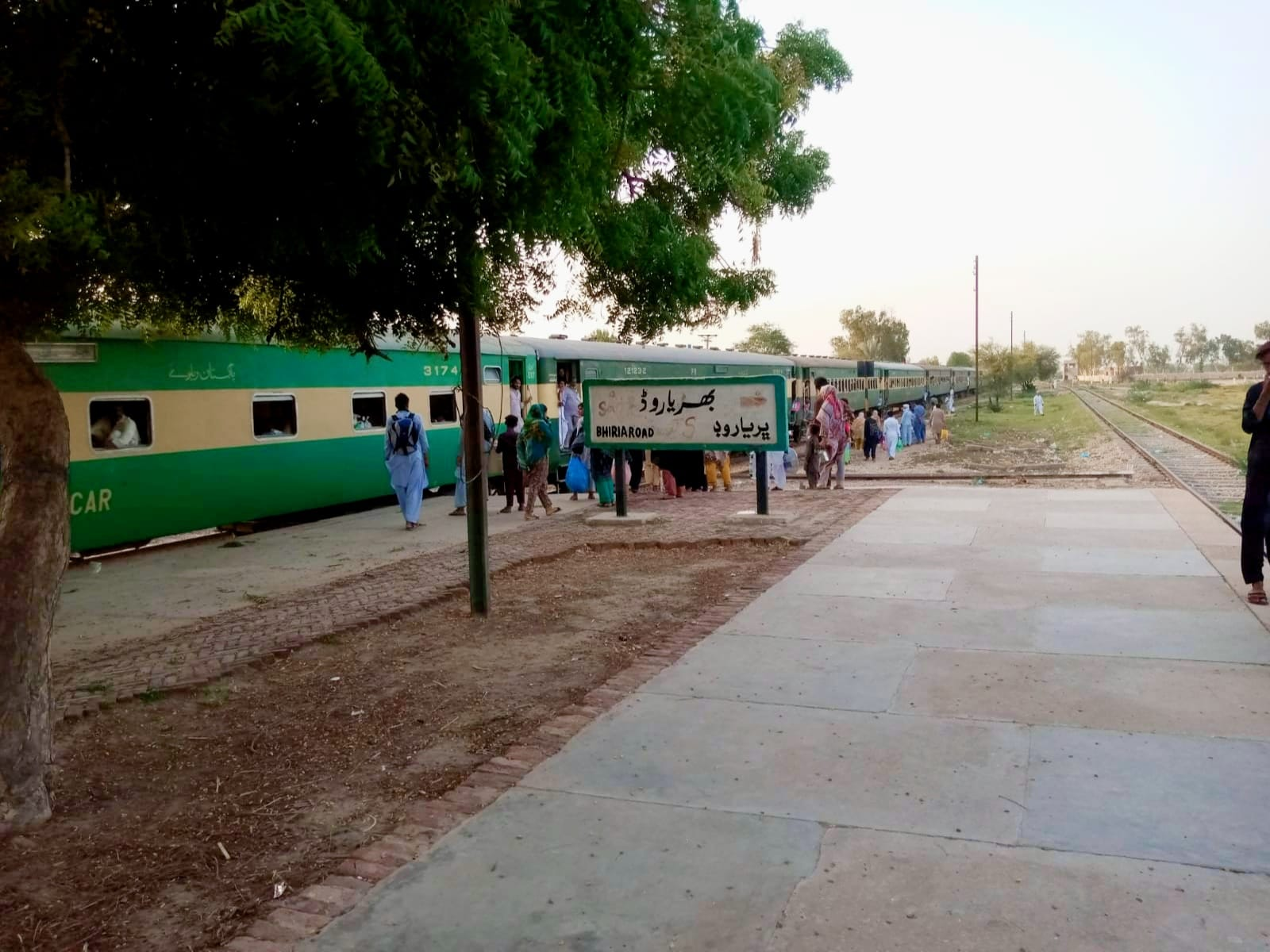

General information
- Coordinates: 26.8888°N 68.2837°E
- Owner: Ministry of Railways
- Line: Karachi–Peshawar Railway Line
- Platforms: 03

Other information
- Station code: BRO

Services
| Preceding station | Pakistan Railways | Following station |
|---|---|---|
| Pad Idan Junction towards Kiamari | Karachi–Peshawar Line | Lakha Road towards Peshawar Cantonment |
Location

Bhiria Road Railway Station (Urdu: بھریا روڈ ریلوے اسٹیشن, Sindhi: ڀريا روڊ ريلوي اسٽيشن) is located in Bhiria road city, Naushahro Feroze district of Sindh province, Pakistan.

== Train Stoppage ==
- 09up 10dn Allama Iqbal Express
- 11up 12dn Hazara Express
- 13up 14dn Awam Express
- 17up 18dn Millat Express
- 25up 26dn Bahauddin Zakaria Express
- 37up 38dn Fareed Express
- 47up 48dn Rehman Baba Express
- 145up 146dn Sukkur Express

== See also ==
- List of railway stations in Pakistan
- Pakistan Railways
