= Mahesar railway station =

Railway station in Pakistan

Mahesar Railway Station ماہیسر ریلوے اسٹیشن مهيسر ريلوي اسٽيشن

General information
- Coordinates: 27.9219°N 69.1988°E
- Owner: Ministry of Railways
- Line: Karachi–Peshawar Railway Line

Other information
- Station code: MHS

Services
Preceding station	Pakistan Railways	Following station
Pano Akil towards Kiamari	Karachi–Peshawar Line	Ghotki towards Peshawar Cantonment
Location

Mahesar Railway Station (Urdu: ماہیسر ریلوے اسٹیشن, Sindhi: مھيسر ريلوي اسٽيشن) is located in Mahesar village, Sukkur district of Sindh province, Pakistan.

== See also ==
- List of railway stations in Pakistan
- Pakistan Railways
