= Allahdadani railway station =

Railway station in Pakistan

Coordinates: 27.790331°N 68.565829°E

Allahdadani railway station الله دادانی ریلوے اسٹیشن

General information
- Owner: Ministry of Railways
- Line: Kotri–Attock Railway Line

Other information
- Station code: ADN
Location

Allahdadani railway station (Urdu: الله دادانی ریلوے اسٹیشن, Sindhi: الھہ داداڻي ریلوي اسٽیشن) is located in Pakistan.

== See also ==
- List of railway stations in Pakistan
- Pakistan Railways
