= Hafizabad railway station =

Railway station in Pakistan

Hafizabad Railway Station حافظ آباد ریلوے اسٹیشن

General information
- Owner: Ministry of Railways
- Line: Khanewal–Wazirabad Branch Line

Construction
- Parking: Available
- Accessible: Available

Other information
- Station code: HFD

History
- Opened: 15 August 1895

Services
Preceding station	Pakistan Railways	Following station
Kaleke towards Khanewal Junction	Khanewal–Wazirabad Branch Line	Gajargola towards Wazirabad Junction
Location

Hafizabad railway station (Urdu: حافظ آباد ریلوے اسٹیشن) is located in Hafizabad city, Hafizabad district of Punjab province of the Pakistan.

The station operates four trains to different parts of the country. On the Wazirabad - Faisalabad Railway Section, Hafizabad is the eighth railway station.

== See also ==
- List of railway stations in Pakistan
- Pakistan Railways
