= Gopang railway station =

Railway station in Pakistan

Coordinates: 27°35′N 68°07′E

Gopang railway station گوپانگ ريلوي اسٽيشن

General information
- Owner: Ministry of Railways

Other information
- Station code: GPG

History
- Former names: Great Indian Peninsula Railway
Location

Gopaag railway station (Urdu: گوپانگ ریلوے اسٹیشن, Sindhi: گوپانگ ريلوي اسٽيشن) is located in Pakistan.

== See also ==
- List of railway stations in Pakistan
- Pakistan Railways
