= Samand wala railway station =

Railway station in Pakistan

Coordinates: 32.693438°N 71.562291°E

Samandwala railway station

General information
- Owner: Ministry of Railways

Other information
- Station code: SMW

History
- Former names: Great Indian Peninsula Railway
Location

Samandwala railway station (Urdu: سمندوالا ریلوے اسٹیشن) is located in Pakistan.

== See also ==
- List of railway stations in Pakistan
- Pakistan Railways
