= Thermal Power Station railway station =

Railway station in Punjab, Pakistan

General information
- Owner: Ministry of Railways

Other information
- Station code: TPS

History
- Former names: Great Indian Peninsula Railway

Thermal Power Station railway station (Urdu: تھرمل پاور سٹیشن ریلوے اسٹیشن) is located in Muzaffargarh Punjab, Pakistan. This railway station is facilitating Thermal Power Station Muzaffargarh.

== See also ==
- List of railway stations in Muzaffargarh
- List of railway stations in Pakistan
- Pakistan Railways
