= Adam Wahan railway station =

Railway station in Punjab, Pakistan

Adam Wahan Railway Station آدم واہن ریلوے اسٹیشن

General information
- Coordinates: 29.4704°N 71.6441°E
- Owner: Ministry of Railways
- Line: Karachi–Peshawar Railway Line

Other information
- Station code: ADW

History
- Former names: Adamwahan Bridge railway station

Services
Preceding station	Pakistan Railways	Following station
Bahawalpur towards Kiamari	Karachi–Peshawar Line	Lodhran Junction towards Peshawar Cantonment
Location

Adam Wahan Railway Station (Urdu and Punjabi: آدم واہن ریلوے اسٹیشن) is located in Adam Wahan village, Lodhran district of Punjab province, Pakistan.

== See also ==
- List of railway stations in Pakistan
- Pakistan Railways
