= Sheikh Mandah railway station =

Railway station in Balochistan, Pakistan

Sheikh Mandah Station شیخ ماندہ ریلوے اسٹیشن

General information
- Coordinates: 30.2536°N 66.9707°E
- Owner: Ministry of Railways
- Line: Rohri-Chaman Railway Line

Other information
- Station code: SMS

Services
Preceding station	Pakistan Railways	Following station
Quetta towards Rohri Junction	Rohri–Chaman Line	Beleli towards Chaman
Location

Sheikh Mandah Railway Station (Urdu: شیخ ماندہ ریلوے اسٹیشن, Balochi: شیخ ماندہ ریلوے اسٹیشن) is located in Sheikh Mandah town, Quetta district of Balochistan province of the Pakistan.

== See also ==
- List of railway stations in Pakistan
- Pakistan Railways
