= Madeji Road railway station =

Railway station in Pakistan

Coordinates: 27.739367°N 68.472703°E

Madeji Road railway station مديجي روڊ ريلوي اسٽيشن

General information
- Owner: Ministry of Railways

Other information
- Station code: MJI

History
- Former names: Great Indian Peninsula Railway
Location

Madeji Road railway station (Sindhi: مديجي روڊ ريلوي اسٽيشن, Urdu: مدیجی روڈ ریلوے اسٹیشن) is located in Madeji, Pakistan.

== See also ==
- List of railway stations in Pakistan
- Pakistan Railways
