= List of active railway stations in Pakistan =

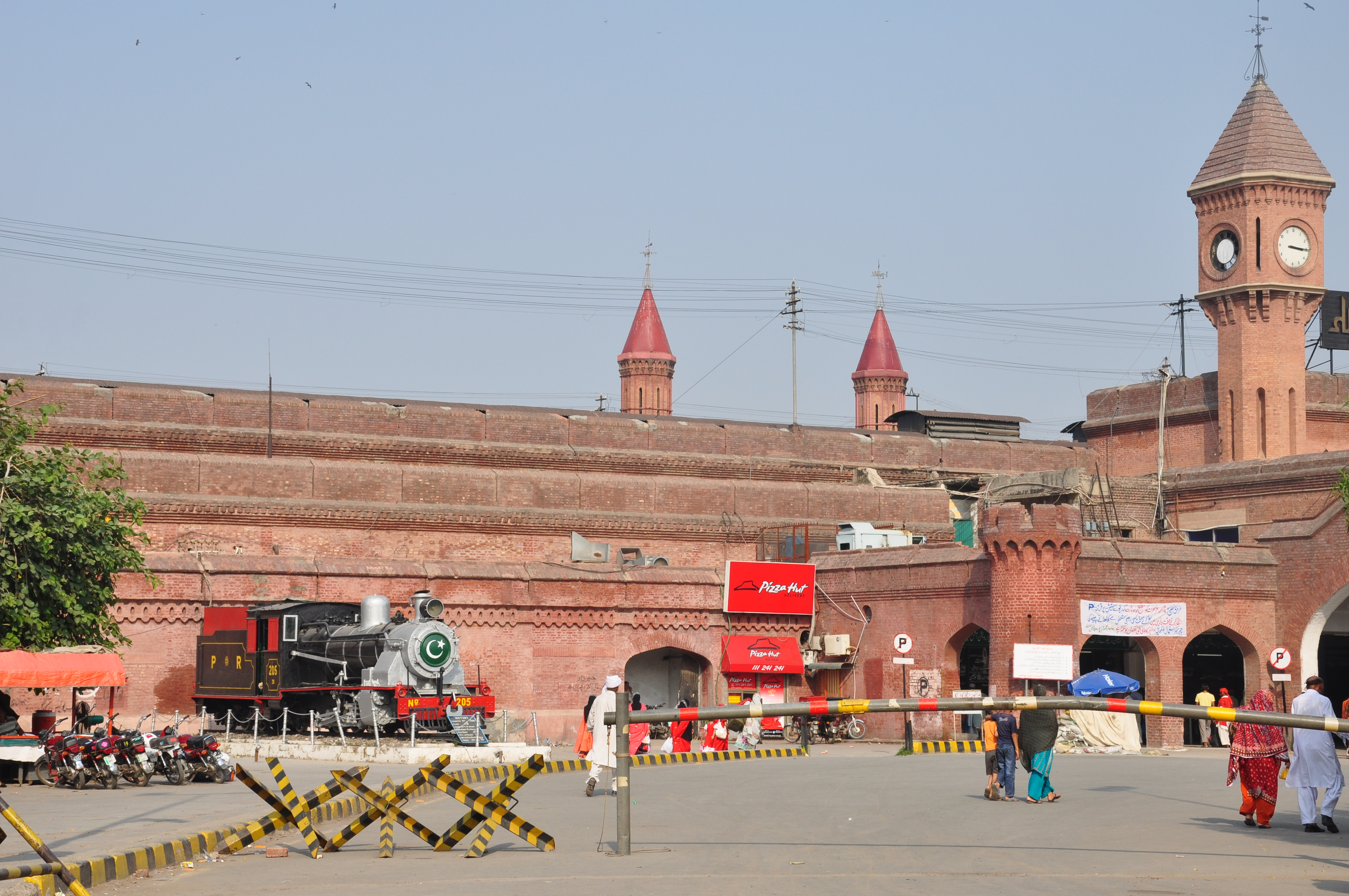
Lahore Junction railway station in Lahore, Pakistan's largest railway station in terms of area.

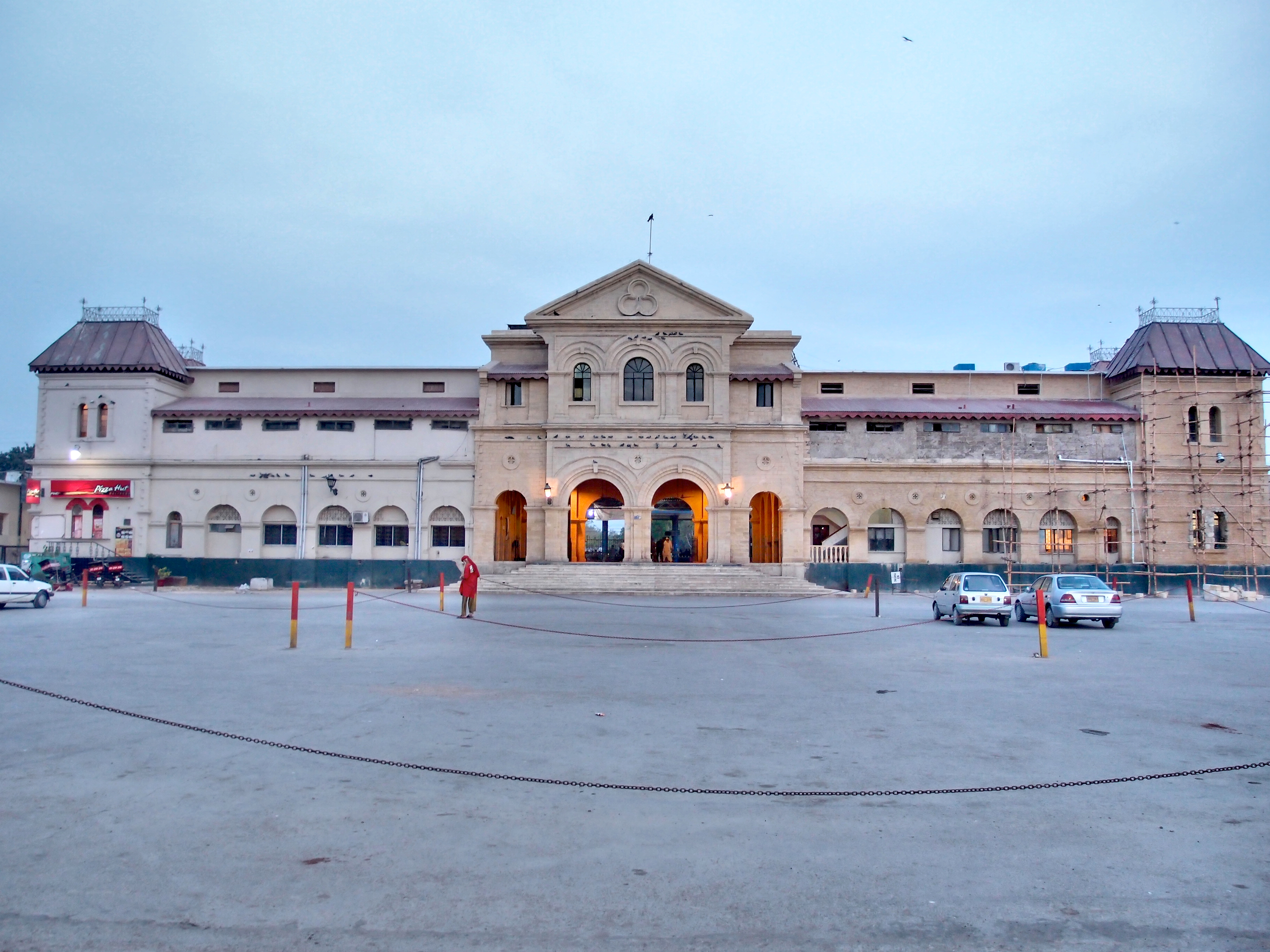
Karachi Cantonment railway station in Karachi is the busiest station in Pakistan.

The following are the active railway stations in Pakistan.

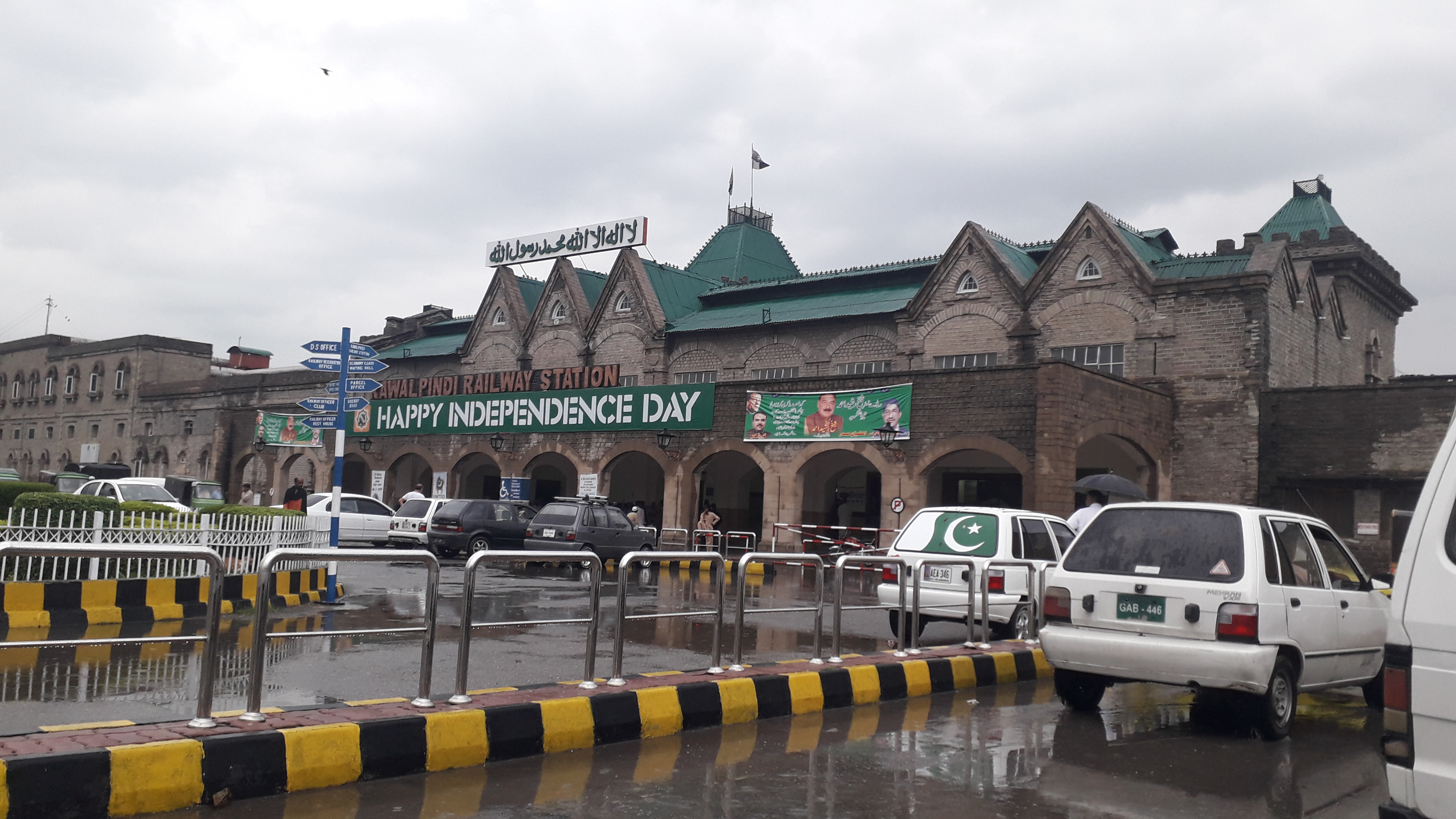
Rawalpindi Railway Station

== Balochistan ==
- Aab-e-Gum
- Ahmedwal
- Beleli
- Bostan Junction
- Bukhtiarabad Domki
- Chaman
- Dalbandin
- Damboli
- Dera Allah Yar
- Dera Murad Jamali
- Dozan
- Gulistan
- Hirok
- Kishingi
- Koh-e-Taftan
- Kolpur
- Kuchlak
- Mach
- Mushkaf
- Nushki
- Nuttall
- Panir
- Pehro Kunri
- Perak
- Peshi
- Qilla Abdullah
- Quetta
- Saranan Halt
- Sar-I-Ab
- Sheikh Mandah
- Shela Bagh
- Sibi Junction
- Spezand Junction
- Yaru

== Islamabad Capital Territory ==
- Golra Sharif Junction
- Margalla
- Tarnol

== Khyber Pakhtunkhwa ==
- Akora Khattak
- Babari Banda
- Baldher
- Faqir Hussain Shaheed
- Haripur Hazara
- Havelian
- Jahangira Road
- Khairabad Kund
- Khushhal Kot
- Kohat Cantonment
- Kot Najibullah
- Nasarpur
- Nowshera Junction
- Peshawar Cantonment
- Peshawar City
- Pabbi
- Pir Piai
- Seni Gumbat
- Serai Saleh Halt
- Taru Jabba

== Punjab ==
- Abdul Hakim
- Adam Sahaba
- Adam Wahan
- Ajnala
- Akhtar Karnana
- Alipur Chatta
- Alluwali
- Arif Wala
- Ashanpur
- Attock City Junction
- Attock Khurd
- Badami Bagh
- Baddomalhi
- Bahalike
- Bahawalpur
- Bana Mianwala Halt
- Basal Junction
- Basal Sharif
- Basirpur
- Basti Darwesh Lashari
- Bhakkar
- Bhalwal
- Buchiana
- Budh
- Budho
- Burhan
- Burj
- Chak Jhumra Junction
- Chaklala
- Chalisa Junction
- Changa Manga
- Charnali
- Chawinda
- Chenab Nagar
- Chhab
- Chichoki Mallian
- Chillianwala
- Chiniot
- Chund
- Chura Sharif Halt
- Chichawatni
- Chutiana
- Dabanwala
- Darkhana
- Dar ul Ihsan
- Darya Khan
- Daud
- Daud Khel Junction
- Dera Dinpanah
- Dera Ghazi Khan
- Dera Nawab Sahib
- Dera Taj
- Dhaunkal
- Dina
- Dinga
- Domala
- Domel
- Dunyapur
- Eminabad
- Faisalabad
- Farooq Abad
- Fateh Jang
- Faqirabad
- Fazilpur Dhandi
- Feroza
- Gagan
- Gaggoo
- Ghakhar Mandi
- Gilawala
- Gojra
- Gujar Khan
- Gujranwala
- Gujranwala Cantonment
- Gujrat
- Gunna Kalan
- Gurmani
- Habibabad
- Hafizabad
- Haji Chand
- Haranpur Junction
- Harappa
- Hariah
- Haripur Band
- Haveli Wasawewala
- Hasan Abdal
- Injra
- Jahania
- Jamke Chatta
- Jampur
- Jamraniwah
- Jan Muhammad Wala
- Jand Junction
- Jangal Mariala
- Jarala
- Jaranwala
- Jauharabad
- Jhalar
- Jhang Sadar
- Jhelum
- Jhetha Bhutta
- Jia Bagga
- Kahal
- Kahror Pakka
- Kala Khatai
- Kalanchwala
- Kaleke
- Kamalia
- Kamoke
- Kanjur
- Kanjwani
- Karor
- Kassowal
- Kasur Junction
- Khanewal Junction
- Khanpur
- Kharian Cantonment
- Kharian City
- Khudian Khas
- Kundian Junction
- Khushab Junction
- Kissan
- Kot Addu Junction
- Kot Behram
- Kot Chutta
- Kot Radha Kishan
- Kutabpur
- Lahore Junction
- Lal Pir
- Lala Musa Junction
- Lalian
- Leiah
- Liaquat Pur
- Lodhran Junction
- Machhianwala
- Mahmud Kot
- Mailsi
- Makhdumpur Pahoran
- Malakwal Junction
- Mamu Kanjan
- Mandra
- Mandi Ahmed Abad
- Mandi Burewala
- Mandi Bahauddin
- Mansurwali
- Mari Indus
- Marh Balochan
- Massan
- Mehar Shah
- Mehta Suja
- Mianwali
- Mian Shamir
- Missa Keswal
- Mithan Kot
- Mitha Tiwana
- Moman
- Mubarakpur
- Multan Cantonment
- Murad Chishti
- Muzaffargarh
- Nammal
- Nankana Sahib
- Narowal Junction
- Narang
- Okara
- Okara Cantonment
- Pakka Anna
- Pakhowal
- Pakpattan
- Pasrur
- Pattoki
- Pejowali
- Pind Dadan Khan
- Pir Mahal
- Phularwan
- Prem Nagar
- Qaidabad
- Qila Sattar Shah
- Qila Sheikhupura Junction
- Qila Sobha Singh
- Rahim Yar Khan
- Raiwind Junction
- Rajanpur
- Rajput Nagar
- Raokhan wala
- Rawalpindi
- Raya Khas
- Renala Khurd
- Riazabad
- Risalewala
- Rojhan
- Rumian
- Rurala Road
- Sadiqabad
- Sadhoke
- Safdarabad
- Sahianwala
- Sahiwal
- Samand wala
- Sambrial
- Sanawan
- Sangla Hill Junction
- Sanjwal
- Sarai Alamgir
- Sargodha Junction
- Sar Shamir Road
- Shadan Lund
- Shahidanwala
- Shahinabad Junction
- Shujabad
- Shah Jewana
- Shah Nikdur
- Shahwali
- Sher Shah Junction
- Shorkot Cantonment Junction
- Sialkot Junction
- Sillanwali
- Sobhaga
- Sodhra Kopra
- Sohawa
- Sukheke
- Tandliawala
- Tarinda
- Taunsa Barrage
- Taxila Cantonment Junction
- Thatta Mahla
- Thermal Power
- Toba Tek Singh
- Uchhri
- Ugoki
- Usmanwala
- Usman Khattar
- Vehari
- Wah
- Wah Cantonment
- Walton
- Wanbhacharan
- Warburton
- Waryam
- Wazirabad Junction
- Wegowal
- Yousafwala
- Zarif Shaheed

== Sindh ==
- Abad
- Abdullahabad Halt
- Airport Halt
- Allahdino Sand
- Amri
- Arian Road
- Badah
- Badal Nala
- Bakrani Road
- Balishah
- Balochabad
- Bandhi
- Bin Qasim
- Bhan Sayadabad
- Bhiria Road
- Bholari
- Braudabad
- Bubak Road
- Bucheri
- Budhapur
- Cadet College Petaro
- Chhor
- Daur
- Dadu
- Daharki
- Daur
- Departure Yard
- Detha
- Dhabeji
- Dhoro Naro
- Drigh Colony
- Drigh Road
- Gambat
- Ghotki
- Gopang
- Gosarji
- Habib Kot Junction
- Hasisar
- Haibat Shaheed
- Hyderabad Junction
- Jacobabad Junction
- Jalal Marri
- Jamrao Junction
- Jalo Jo Chaounro
- Jhimpir
- Jungshahi
- Kandkot
- Karachi City
- Karachi Cantonment
- Kashmor Colony
- Kiamari
- Khairpur
- Khokhropar
- Khanot
- Khudabad
- Kotri Junction
- Kot Lalloo
- Laki Shah Saddar
- Lakha Road
- Landhi
- Larkana
- Lundo
- Madeji Road
- Mahesar
- Mahota
- Mando Dairo
- Manjhand
- Mehrabpur Junction
- Mirpur Khas
- Mohenjo-daro
- Nawabshah
- New Chhor
- Oderolal
- Padidan
- Palijani
- Parche-Ji-Veri
- Phulji
- Piaro Goth
- Pithoro Junction
- Radhan
- Ranipur Riyasat
- Ran Pethani
- Rashidabad Halt
- Rehmani Nagar
- Reti
- Rohri Junction
- Ruk
- Sadhar Halt
- Saindad
- Sangi
- Sann
- Sarhad
- Sarhari
- Sehwan Sharif
- Setharja
- Shahdadpur
- Shadipalli
- Shah Nawaz Bhutto
- Shikarpur
- Sihar
- Sindh University
- South Block Hut
- Sukkur
- Sultanabad
- Sultankot
- Sumrasar Halt
- Tajpur Nasarpur Road
- Tando Adam Junction
- Tando Allahyar
- Tando Jam
- Tando Mustikhan
- Vasar Bah
- Wahab Shah

== Complete alphabetical list ==
- Abad railway station (AAD)
- Abdul Hakim railway station (XG)
- Abdullahabad Halt railway station (AABD)
- Ab-I-Gum railway station (ABG)
- Adamshaba railway station (ASA)
- Admwahan railway station (ADW)
- Ahmedwal railway station (AHW)
- Airport Halt Railway Station (APRT)
- Ajnala railway station (AAJ)
- Akora Khattak railway station (AKO)
- Alipur Chatta railway station (ACH)
- Allahdadani railway station (ADN)
- Allahdino Sand railway station (ADS)
- Alluwali railway station (AWI)
- Amri railway station (AMI)
- Arian Road railway station (AOD)
- Arif Wala railway station (ARF)
- Ashanpur railway station (ASH)
- Attock City Junction railway station (ATCY)
- Attock Khurd railway station (ATK)
- Babari Banda railway station (BJB)
- Badah railway station (BDR)
- Badal Nala railway station (BDNL)
- Badami Bagh railway station (BBG)
- Baddomalhi railway station (BDML)
- Bahalike railway station (BKZ)
- Bahawalpur railway station (BWPR)
- Bakhtiarabad Domki railway station (BKDK)
- Bakrani Road railway station (BKR)
- Baldher railway station (BZD)
- Baldia railway station (BDAA)
- Balishah railway station (BSF)
- Balochabad railway station (BLBD)
- Bandhi railway station (BHE)
- Banh Mianwala Halt railway station (BMWL)
- Basal Junction railway station (BOS)
- Basal Sharif railway station (BOSS)
- Basirpur railway station (BSU)
- Begmanji railway station (BGE)
- Behal railway station (BEL)
- Beleli railway station (BLI)
- Bhakkar railway station (BHKR)
- Bhalwal railway station (BWQ)
- Bhan Sayadabad railway station (BAN)
- Bhiria Road railway station (BRO)
- Bholari railway station (BOL)
- Bin Qasim railway station (BQM)
- Bostan Junction railway station (BTN)
- Braudabad railway station (BKB)
- Bubak Road railway station (BUK)
- Bucheri railway station (BCR)
- Buchiana railway station (BCX)
- Budhapur railway station (BDP)
- Budh railway station (BVD)
- Budho railway station (BUO)
- Burhan railway station (BUN)
- Burj railway station (BURJ)
- Cadet Collage Petaro railway station (CCQ)
- Chak Jhumra Junction railway station (CKJ)
- Chaklala railway station (CKL)
- Chak Saida railway station (CKSA)
- Chalisa Junction railway station (CHS)
- Chaman railway station (CMN)
- Changa Manga railway station (CGM)
- Chanigot railway station (CNG)
- Charnali railway station (CRH)
- Chawinda railway station (CWD)
- Chenab Nagar railway station (CNR)
- Chenab West Bank railway station (CWB)
- Chhab railway station (CBB)
- Chhor railway station (COH)
- Chichawatni railway station (CCE)
- Chichoki Mallian railway station (CCM)
- Chilianwala railway station (CHW)
- Chinot railway station (CHOT)
- Chund railway station (CUH)
- Chura Sharif Halt railway station (CHSF)
- Chutiana railway station (CUN)
- Dabanawala railway station (DBX)
- Dabheji railway station (DBJ)
- Dadu railway station (Pakistan) (DDU)
- Daharki railway station (DRK)
- Dalbandin railway station (DLH)
- Dar Ul Ihsan railway station (DRLN)
- Darkhana railway station (DKH)
- Darya Khan railway station (DYN)
- Daud Halt Junction railway station
- Daud Khel Junction railway station (DKL)
- Daur railway station (DOU)
- Dera Allahyar railway station (DAHR)
- Dera Dinpanah railway station (DNP)
- Dera Murad Jamali railway station (DMJJ)
- Dera Nawab Sahib railway station (DWBS)
- Dera Taj railway station (DRTJ)
- Detha railway station (DET)
- Dhaunkal railway station (DUX)
- Dhoro Naro railway station (DNO)
- Dina railway station (DIN)
- Dinga railway station (DGH)
- Dingra railway station (DNF)
- Domala railway station (DMLA)
- Domel railway station (DOME)
- Dorata railway station (DTA)
- Dozan railway station (DZN)
- Drigh Road railway station (DID)
- Drigh Colony Halt railway station (DCL)
- Dunyapur railway station (DYR)
- Eminabad railway station (EMBD)
- Faisalabad railway station (FSLD)
- Faisalabad Dry Port railway station (FDP)
- Faqirabad railway station (FQB)
- Faqir Hussain Shaheed railway station (FQHD)
- Farooq Abad railway station (FRQD)
- Fatehjang railway station (FJG)
- Feroza railway station (FRA)
- Gaddar railway station (GDR)
- Gagan railway station (GGK)
- Gagoo railway station (GOO)
- Gambat railway station (GBT)
- Ghotki railway station (GHK)
- Gilawala railway station (GLW)
- Gojra railway station (GJA)
- Golra Sharif Junction railway station (GLRS)
- Gopang railway station (GPG)
- Gosarji railway station (GSRJ)
- Gujar Khan railway station (GKN)
- Gujranwala railway station (GRW)
- Gujranwala Cant railway station (GRWC)
- Gujrat railway station (GRT)
- Gulistan railway station (GTN)
- Gunna Kalan railway station (GKO)
- Gurmani railway station (GUI)
- Habib Kot Junction railway station (HBKJ)
- Habibabad railway station (HBAD)
- Hafizabad railway station (HFD)
- Haranpur Junction railway station (HNP)
- Harappa railway station (HAP)
- Hariah railway station (HRA)
- Haripur Band railway station (HPD)
- Haripur Hazara railway station (HRU)
- Hasan Abdal railway station (HSN)
- Hasisar railway station (HSS)
- Hatala Halt railway station (HTA)
- Haveli Wasawewala railway station (HWSW)
- Hirok railway station (HRK)
- Hyderabad Junction railway station (HDR)
- Injra railway station (IJA)
- Jacobabad Junction railway station (JCD)
- Jahania railway station (JAI)
- Jalal Marri railway station (JLMR)
- Jalo Jo Chaounro railway station
- Jaman Shah railway station (JNS)
- Jamke Chatta railway station (JCT)
- Jamraniwah railway station (JMH)
- Jamrao Junction railway station (JMO)
- Jan Muhammad Wala railway station (JMW)
- Jand Junction railway station (JAD)
- Jangal Mariala railway station (JMY)
- Janiwala railway station (JWA)
- Jarala railway station (JRF)
- Jaranwala railway station (JNW)
- Jauharabad railway station (JAHD)
- Jaurah Karnana railway station (JRH)
- Jhalar railway station (JRN)
- Jhamat railway station (JHMT)
- Jhang City railway station (JHC)
- Jhang Sadar railway station (JGH)
- Jhangira Road railway station (JHR)
- Jhelum railway station (JMR)
- Jhetha Bhutta railway station (JTA)
- Jhimpir railway station (JHP)
- Jia Bagga railway station (JBA)
- Jummah Goth railway station (JMTH)
- Jungshahi railway station (JGS)
- Kahal railway station (KHL)
- Kahror Pakka railway station (KQP)
- Kala Khatai railway station (KLKT)
- Kala Shah Kaku railway station (KBS)
- Kalanchwala railway station (KCW)
- Kaleke railway station (KKE)
- Kallur Kot railway station (KLO)
- Kamalia railway station (KZM)
- Kamoke railway station (KAM)
- Kandiaro railway station (KDRO)
- Kanganpur railway station (KZN)
- Kanjur railway station (KUJ)
- Kanjwani railway station (KJK)
- Karachi Cant railway station (KC)
- Karachi City railway station (KYC)
- Karor railway station (KOR)
- Kassowal railway station (KSL)
- Kasur Junction railway station (KUS)
- Khairabad Kund railway station (KBD)
- Khairpur railway station (KHP)
- Khanewal Junction railway station (KWL)
- Khanot railway station (KNOT)
- Khanpur Junction railway station (KPR)
- Kharian railway station (KRN)
- Kharian Cant railway station (KRNC)
- Khokhropar railway station (KHO)
- Khost railway station (KOS)
- Khudabad railway station (KBW)
- Khudian Khas railway station (KHUK)
- Khushab Junction railway station (KHB)
- Khushhal railway station (KHLK)
- Kila Abdulla railway station (KAB)
- Kila Sobha Singh railway station (QSB)
- Kirdagap railway station (KDB)
- Kishingi railway station (KNV)
- Kissan railway station (KFS)
- Kohat Cant railway station (KHCT)
- Kolpur railway station (KLR)
- Kot Adu Junction railway station (ADK)
- Kot Lakhpat railway station (LKP)
- Kot Lalloo railway station (KQO)
- Kot Najib Ullah railway station (KJQ)
- Kot Sultan railway station (KTS)
- Kot-Lalloo railway station (KQO)
- Kotri Junction railway station (KOT)
- Kotsamaba railway station (KTSB)
- Kuchali Halt railway station (KCL)
- Kuchlak railway station (KCK)
- Koh-e-Taftan railway station (TFT)
- Kul Mokal railway station (KXU)
- Kundian Junction railway station (KDA)
- Kutabpur railway station (KUZ)
- Lahore Cant railway station (LRC)
- Lahore Junction railway station (LHR)
- Lakha Road railway station (LKD)
- Laki Shah Saddar railway station (LSS)
- Lal Pir railway station (LLPR)
- Lala Musa Junction railway station (LLM)
- Lalian railway station (LLAN)
- Landhi Junction railway station (LND)
- Langar Halt railway station (LGR)
- Larkana Junction railway station (LRK)
- Layari railway station (LYR)
- Leiah railway station (LAH)
- Liaquatpur railway station (LQP)
- Lodhran Junction railway station (LON)
- Lundo railway station (LDO)
- Mach railway station (MCH)
- Machhianwala railway station (MCW)
- Machi Goth railway station (MGQ)
- Madeji Road railway station (MJI)
- Mahesar railway station (MHS)
- Mahmud Kot railway station (MHK)
- Mahrabpur Junction railway station (MHR)
- Mailsi railway station (MSX)
- Makhad Road railway station (MBR)
- Makhdumpur Pahoran railway station (MDO)
- Malakwal Junction railway station (MKW)
- Malir railway station (MXB)
- Malir Colony railway station (MXBH)
- Mamu Kanjan railway station (MMX)
- Mandi Ahmed Abad railway station (MADD)
- Mandi Baha-Ud-Din railway station (MBDN)
- Mandi Burewala railway station (MBWL)
- Mandra Junction railway station (MNA)
- Manghopir railway station (MGHO)
- Mangoli railway station (MLE)
- Manjhand railway station (MJD)
- Mansurwali railway station (MNW)
- Margalla railway station (MGLA)
- Marh Balochan railway station (MBN)
- Mari Indus railway station (MAT)
- Marshalling Yard Pipri Halt railway station (PIE)
- Massan railway station (MSY)
- Mehta Suja railway station (MSJ)
- Meting railway station (MTG)
- Mian Channun railway station (MYH)
- Mian Shamir railway station (MSHR)
- Mian Wali railway station (MWI)
- Mirjat railway station (MRJT)
- Mirpur Khas Junction railway station (MPS)
- Mirpur Mathelo railway station (MRP)
- Missa Keswal railway station (MSA)
- Missan Kalar railway station (MSKR)
- Mitha Lak railway station (MTQ)
- Mitha Tiwana railway station (MTW)
- Mohenjo-daro railway station
- Moman railway station
- Mona railway station (MOV)
- Mubarakpur railway station (MBK)
- Mudduki railway station (MDI)
- Multan Cant railway station (MUL)
- Muridke railway station (MDK)
- Mushkaf railway station (MKF)
- Muzaffargarh railway station (MZG)
- Nakus railway station (NKS)
- Nammal railway station (NLM)
- Nankana Sahab railway station (NNS)
- Narang railway station (NRNG)
- Narowal Junction railway station (NWL)
- Nasarpur railway station (NPP)
- Nawabshah Junction railway station (NWS)
- New Chhor railway station (NCO)
- Nishtarabad railway station (NSHB)
- Nok Kundi railway station (KDD)
- Nowshera Junction railway station (NSR)
- Nur Shah railway station (NSH)
- Nushki railway station (NSE)
- Nuttall railway station (NTL)
- Oderolal railway station (ODL)
- Okara railway station (OKR)
- Okara Cant railway station (OKC)
- Orangi railway station (ORG)
- Pabbi railway station (PBI)
- Pad Idan Junction railway station (PDI)
- Pai Khel railway station (PIK)
- Paigah railway station (PGHA)
- Pakhowal railway station (PHL)
- Pakka Anna railway station (PCA)
- Pakpattan railway station (PPX)
- Palijani railway station (PJL)
- Panir railway station (PIR)
- Pano Akil railway station (PNL)
- Parche-Ji-Veri railway station
- Pasrur railway station (PSW)
- Pattoki railway station (PTO)
- Pehro Kunri railway station (PFK)
- Pejowali railway station (PJWL)
- Perak railway station (PRQ)
- Peshawar Cant railway station (PSC)
- Peshawar City railway station (PSH)
- Peshi railway station (PSI)
- Phularwan railway station (PHW)
- Phulji railway station (PHJ)
- Piaro Goth railway station (PRX)
- Pind Dadan Khan railway station (PDK)
- Piplan railway station (PPL)
- Pir Mahal railway station (PMX)
- Piran Ghaib railway station (PGB)
- Pithoro Junction railway station (PHO)
- Prem Nagar railway station (PNX)
- Qaidabad railway station (QDG)
- Qila Sattar Shah railway station (QSS)
- Qila Sheikhupura Junction railway station (QSP)
- Quetta railway station (QTA)
- Radhan railway station (RDH)
- Rahim Yar Khan railway station (RYK)
- Raiwind Junction railway station (RND)
- Raja Jang railway station (RJJ)
- Rajput Nagar railway station (RPNG)
- Ran Pethani railway station (RPN)
- Ranipur Riyasat railway station (RAN)
- Rashidabad Halt railway station
- Ratto Kala railway station (RTK)
- Rawalpindi railway station (RWP)
- Raya Khas railway station (RKHS)
- Rehmani Nagar railway station (RMNR)
- Renala Khurd railway station (RKQ)
- Reti railway station (RTE)
- Riazabad railway station (RZD)
- Risalewala railway station (RSE)
- Rohri Junction railway station (ROH)
- Ruk railway station (RUK)
- Rukanpur railway station (RKU)
- Rumian railway station (ROM)
- Rurala Road railway station (RRLN)
- Rustam Sargana railway station (RMG)
- Sadhoke railway station (SDQ)
- Sadikabad railway station (SDK)
- Safdarabad railway station (SFRD)
- Sahianwala railway station (SAHW)
- Sahiwal railway station (SWAL)
- Saindad railway station (SAND)
- Samandwala railway station (SMW)
- Samasata Junction railway station (SMA)
- Sambrial railway station (SMB)
- Samiah railway station (SMTH)
- Sanawan railway station (SNW)
- Sangi railway station (SGI)
- Sangla Hill Junction railway station (SLL)
- Sanjwal railway station (SJU)
- Sann railway station (SANN)
- Sar Shamir Road railway station (SSX)
- Sar-I-Ab railway station (SRB)
- Sarai Alamgir railway station (SXG)
- Saranan Halt railway station
- Sargodha Junction railway station (SRQ)
- Sarhad railway station (SHD)
- Sarhari railway station (SRH)
- Sehwan Sharif railway station (SWN)
- Serai Saleh Halt railway station (SSQ)
- Setharja railway station (STJ)
- Shadipalli railway station (SPI)
- Shah Abdul Latif railway station (SDLF)
- Shah Alam railway station (SAM)
- Shah Jewana railway station (SJW)
- Shah Nawaz Bhutto railway station (SNBT)
- Shah Nikdur railway station (SXU)
- Shahdadpur railway station (SDU)
- Shahdara Bagh Junction railway station (SDR)
- Shaheed Haider Ali railway station
- Shahidanwala railway station (SHY)
- Shahinabad Junction railway station (SHND)
- Shakirabad Halt railway station (SHKR)
- Sharigh railway station (SGH)
- Sheikh Wasil railway station (SWK)
- Shelabagh railway station (SBA)
- Sher Shah Junction railway station (SSH)
- Shikarpur railway station (SHP)
- Shorkot Cantonment Junction railway station (SKO)
- Shujabad railway station (SJB)
- Sialkot Junction railway station (SLK)
- Sibi Junction railway station (SIB)
- Sihar Halt railway station (SHS)
- Sillanwali railway station (SWY)
- Sindh University railway station (SDUT)
- Sobhaga railway station (SBQ)
- Sodhra Kopra railway station (SDA)
- Sohan Bridge railway station (SON)
- Sohawa railway station (SHA)
- Spezand Junction railway station (SZD)
- Srirampura railway station (SRPA)
- Sukheke railway station (SKE)
- Sukkur railway station (SUK)
- Sulemanabad Halt railway station (SLMA)
- Sultan Nagar railway station (SLNR)
- Sultanabad railway station (SULB)
- Sultankot railway station (SOK)
- Tajpur Nasarpur Road railway station (TJNR)
- Tandliawala railway station (TLW)
- Tando Adam Junction railway station (TDM)
- Tando Alahyar railway station (TDA)
- Tando Jam railway station (JTD)
- Tando Mustikhan railway station (TMK)
- Tarinda railway station (TRD)
- Tarnol railway station (TR0)
- Taru Jabba railway station (TAJ)
- Taxila Cantonment Junction railway station (TXL)
- Thatta Mahla railway station (TTM)
- Thermal Power Station railway station (TPS)
- Toba Tek Singh railway station (TTSG)
- Uchhri railway station (UCH)
- Ugoke railway station (UGE)
- Usman Khattar railway station (UKT)
- Usmanwala railway station (UMW)
- Vasar Bah railway station (VSB)
- Vehari railway station
- Wagha railway station (WGH)
- Wah railway station (WAH)
- Wah Cant railway station (WHC)
- Wahab Shah railway station (WHB)
- Wali Khan railway station (WHB)
- Walton (Pakistan) railway station (WTNS)
- Wanbhacharan railway station (WBN)
- Warburton (Pakistan) railway station (WRN)
- Waryam railway station (WYM)
- Wazirabad Junction railway station (WZD)
- Wegowal railway station (WGWL)
- Yaru railway station
- Yusafwala railway station (YSW)
- Zarif Shaheed railway station (ZRSD)

== Inactive Railway Stations ==
- Defunct Islamabad Capital Territory Stations
- Madina-Tul-Hijjaj (MTHJ)
- Nur Junction (NUR)
- Sangjani (SJI)
- Sihala (SIH)
- Defunct Railway Stations in Punjab
- Bakrala (BKRA)
- Chak Pirana (CPI)
- Choa Kariala (CKRL)
- Deona Juliani (DEN)
- Domeli (DMI)
- Ghungrila (GNX)
- Kala Gujran (KLA)
- Kaliam Awan (KWA)
- Kaluwal (KOW)
- Mankiala (MKE)
- Muradi Janjil Halt (MRDJ)
- Ratial (RTL)
- Sangjani (SJI)
- Sukho (SQZ)
- Taragarh (TRX)
- Tarki (TRI)

== See also ==
- Transport in Pakistan
- List of railway lines in Pakistan
