= Daharki railway station =

Railway station in Pakistan

Daharki Railway Station ڈہرکی ریلوے اسٹیشن ڏهرڪي ريلوي اسٽيشن

General information
- Coordinates: 28.0454°N 69.6877°E
- Owner: Ministry of Railways
- Line: Karachi–Peshawar Railway Line

Other information
- Station code: DRK

Services
Preceding station	Pakistan Railways	Following station
Mirpur Mathelo towards Kiamari	Karachi–Peshawar Line	Reti towards Peshawar Cantonment
Location

Daharki Railway Station (Urdu: ڈہرکی ریلوے اسٹیشن, Sindhi: ڏھرڪي ریلوي اسٽیشن) is located in Daharki city, Ghotki district of Sindh province, Pakistan.

== See also ==
- List of railway stations in Pakistan
- Pakistan Railways
