= Mehrabpur Junction railway station =

Pakistani railway station

Mehrabpur Junction Station محراب پور جنکشن ریلوے اسٹیشن محراب پور جنڪشن ريلوي اسٽيشن

General information
- Coordinates: 27.0996°N 68.4210°E
- Owner: Ministry of Railways
- Lines: Karachi–Peshawar Railway Line; Tando Adam–Mehrabpur Branch Line

Other information
- Station code: MHR

Services
Preceding station	Pakistan Railways	Following station
Lakha Road towards Kiamari	Karachi–Peshawar Line	Setharja towards Peshawar Cantonment
Location

Mehrabpur Junction Railway Station (Urdu: محراب پور جنکشن ریلوے اسٹیشن, Sindhi: محراب پور جنڪشن ريلوي اسٽيشن) is located in Mehrabpur city, Naushahro Feroze district of Sindh province, Pakistan.

== Services ==
The following trains stop at Mehrabpur Junction station:

Preceding station	Pakistan Railways	Following station
Nawabshah towards Karachi Cantonment	Allama Iqbal Express	Rohri Junction towards Sialkot Junction

== See also ==
- List of railway stations in Pakistan
- Pakistan Railways
