= Quetta railway station =

Railway station in Pakistan

Quetta Railway Station کوئٹہ ریلوے اسٹیشن
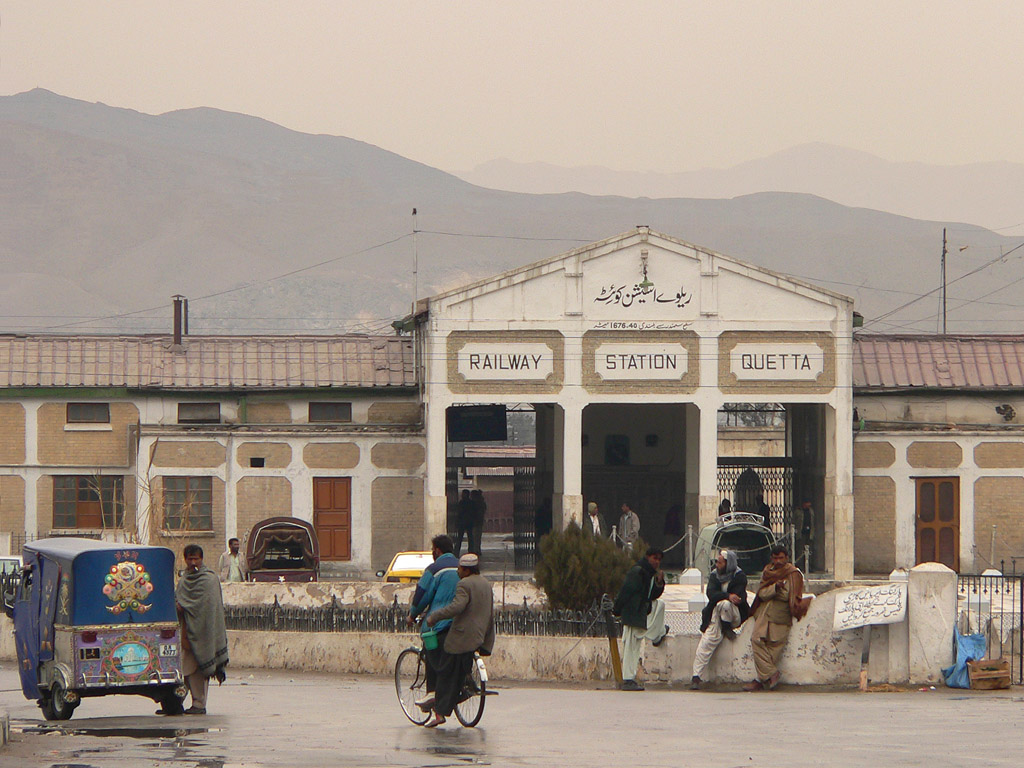
- Quetta Railway Station in 2006 – front view

General information
- Location: 526 Zarghun Road; Quetta, Balochistan 87300; Pakistan
- Coordinates: 30.1915°N 67.0009°E
- Owner: Ministry of Railways
- Lines: Rohri-Chaman Railway Line; Quetta-Taftan Railway Line

Construction
- Structure type: Standard (on ground station)
- Parking: Available
- Cycle facilities: Available
- Accessible: Available

Other information
- Status: Functional
- Station code: QTA

History
- Opened: 1887; 139 years ago

Services
Preceding station	Pakistan Railways	Following station
Sar-I-Ab towards Rohri Junction	Rohri–Chaman Line	Sheikh Mandah towards Chaman
Terminus	Quetta–Taftan Line	Sar-I-Ab towards Zahedan
- Computerized Ticketing Counters Luggage Checking System Parking Disabled Access Food Plaza Kiosks WC Taxi Stand Public Transportation Metro interchange
Location
- Location within Balochistan, Pakistan Location within Pakistan

Quetta Railway Station (Urdu: کوئٹہ اسٹیشن; Balochi: کوئٹہ اسٹیشن) is the main railway station of Quetta, Balochistan, Pakistan. It serves as a major station on the Rohri-Chaman Railway Line and as the eastern terminus of the Quetta-Taftan Railway Line.

== History ==
Quetta was considered a small city during the British Raj. The station was built as part of the strategic line constructed by the Scinde, Punjab & Delhi Railway. Construction began in 1881 and the line opened to traffic in 1887, which by then was part of the North Western State Railway. Quetta was always considered an important strategic destination as Britain feared that the Russian Empire might advance from Afghanistan into Quetta, thereby threatening its rule in South Asia. In 1857, it was suggested by William Andrew (Chairman of Scinde, Punjab & Delhi Railway) that a railway line be constructed through the Bolan Pass. On 18 September 1879, work began on laying the railway tracks, and after four months, the first 215 kilometres of the line from Ruk to Sibi was completed and became operational in January 1881. Beyond Sibi, the terrain was challenging. After immense difficulties and harsh weather conditions, the line reached Quetta in March 1887.

=== 2024 bombing ===
On 9 November 2024, at least 32 people died and at least 62 others were injured in a suicide bombing at the station by the Balochistan Liberation Army, a separatist terrorist group.

== Train routes ==
The following trains stop, terminate or originate at Quetta station:

Preceding station	Pakistan Railways	Following station
Terminus	Akbar Express	Kolpur towards Lahore Junction
Kolpur towards Karachi City	Bolan Mail	Terminus
Terminus	Chaman Mixed	Sheikh Mandah towards Chaman
Terminus	Jaffar Express	Kolpur towards Peshawar Cantonment

Gallery
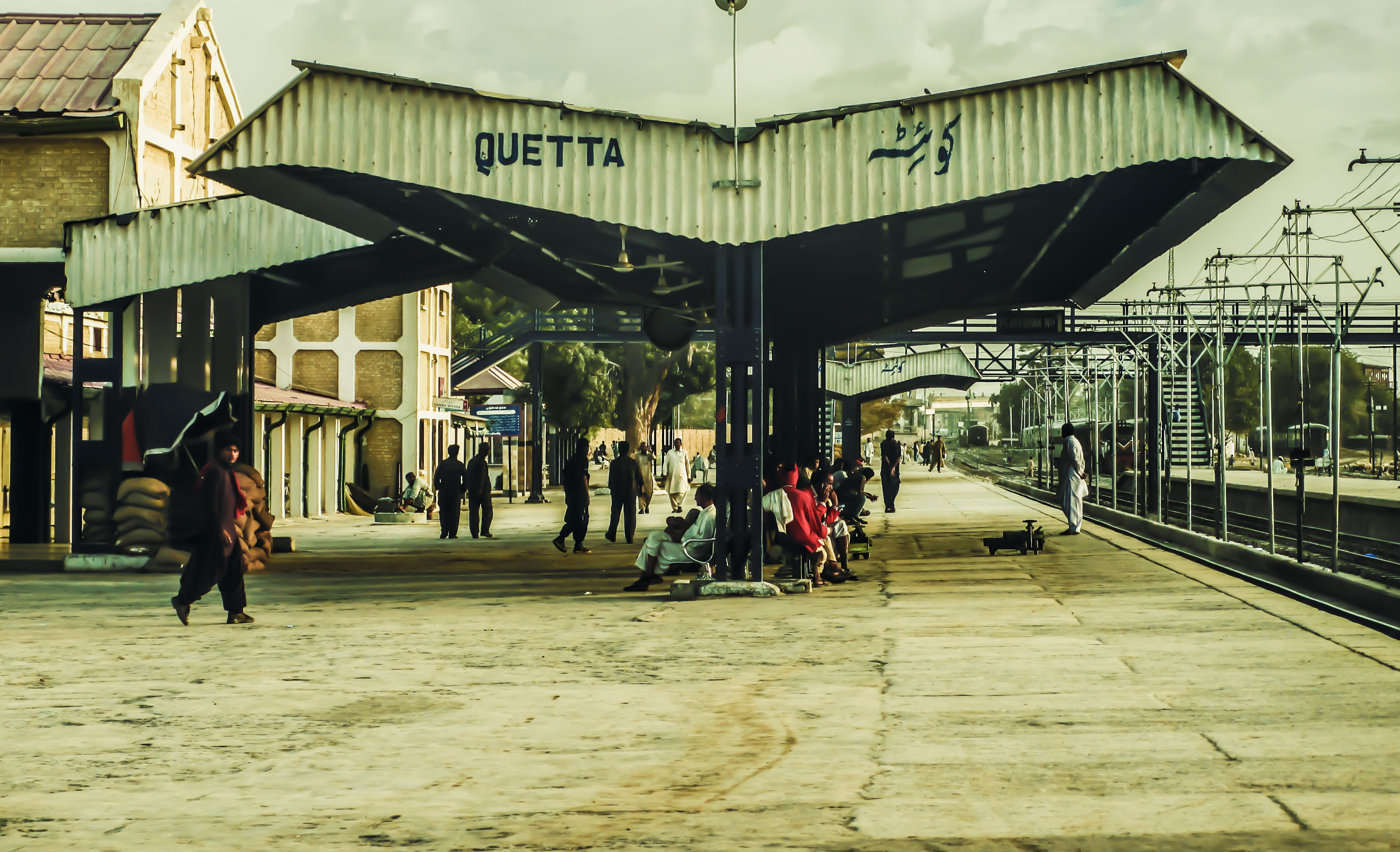
Station platform, 2014

Station entrance, 2023

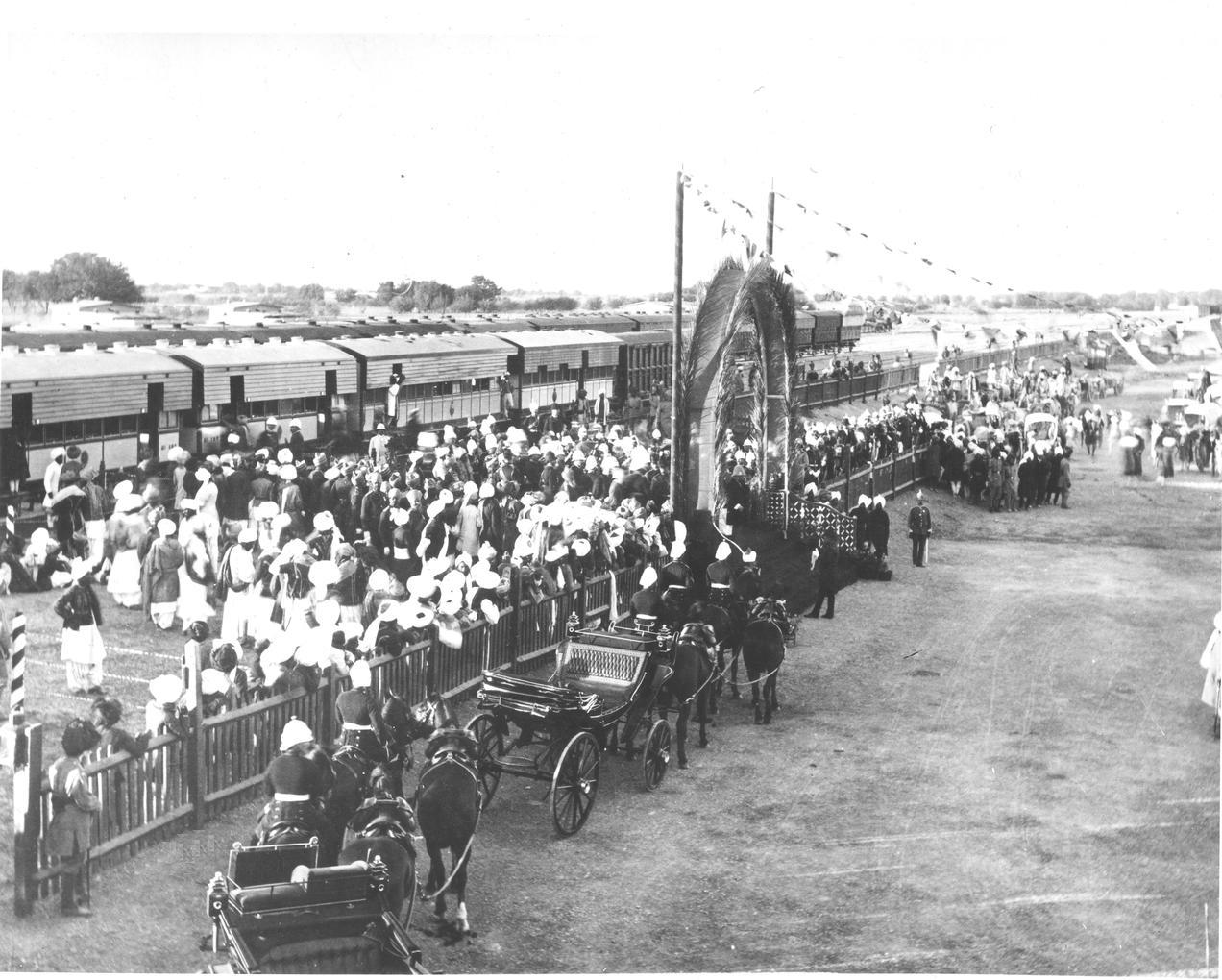
The station in 1894

== See also ==
- Pakistan Railways
- List of railway stations in Pakistan
