= Saranan Halt railway station =

Railway station in Pakistan

Saranan railway station سارانان ریلوے اسٹیشن

General information
- Coordinates: 30.567778°N 66.868889°E
- Owner: Ministry of Railways

Other information
- Station code: SHO
Location

Saranan railway station (Urdu: سارانان ریلوے اسٹیشن) is located in Pakistan.

== See also ==
- List of railway stations in Pakistan
- Pakistan Railways
