= Kotri Junction railway station =

Railway station in Sindh, Pakistan

Kotri Junction Railway Station کوٹری جنکشن ریلوے اسٹیشن
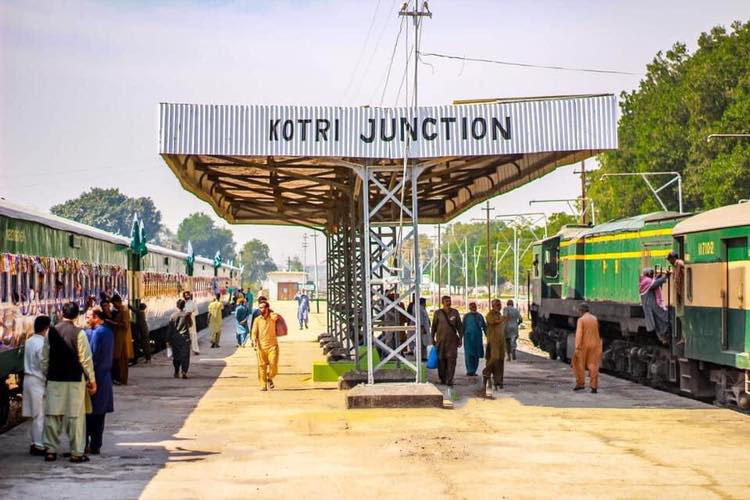

General information
- Location: Kotri Station Road; Kotri, Sindh 76000; Pakistan
- Coordinates: 25.3668°N 68.2976°E
- Owner: Ministry of Railways
- Lines: Karachi–Peshawar Railway Line; Kotri–Attock Railway Line

Construction
- Parking: Available
- Accessible: Available

Other information
- Station code: KOT

History
- Opened: 13 May 1861

Services
Preceding station	Pakistan Railways	Following station
Bholari towards Kiamari	Karachi–Peshawar Line	Hyderabad Junction towards Peshawar Cantonment
Terminus	Kotri–Attock Line	Jamshoro towards Attock City Junction
Location

Kotri Junction Railway Station (Urdu: کوٹری جنکشن ریلوے اسٹیشن, Sindhi: ڪوٽڙي جنکشن ريلوي اسٽيشن) of Pakistan Railways is located in Kotri city, Jamshoro district of Sindh province, Pakistan. The station is on the Karachi–Peshawar and Kotri–Attock railway lines.

== History ==
Kotri Junction station is among the oldest railway stations in Pakistan. It served as the northern terminus of the Scinde Railway, which was established in March 1855. A railway line was to be constructed between Karachi and Kotri and work on the Karachi terminus commenced in April 1858. By 13 May 1861, the station opened to the public. This was the first railway line for public traffic between Karachi and Kotri, a distance of 108 miles (174 km).

== Services ==
The following trains stop at Kotri Junction station:

Preceding station	Pakistan Railways	Following station
Drigh Road towards Karachi Cantonment	Allama Iqbal Express	Hyderabad Junction towards Sialkot Junction
Braudabad towards Karachi City	Bolan Mail	Sind University towards Quetta
Landhi Junction towards Karachi Cantonment	Khyber Mail	Hyderabad Junction towards Peshawar Cantonment

== See also ==
- List of railway stations in Pakistan
- Pakistan Railways
