= Gujrat railway station =

Railway station in Pakistan

Gujrat Railway Station گجرات ریلوے اسٹیشن
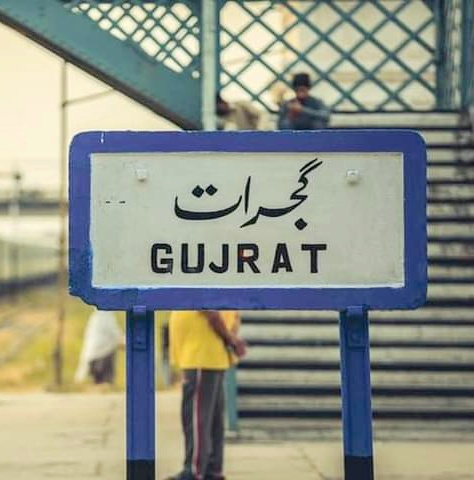

General information
- Coordinates: 32.5627°N 74.0645°E
- Owner: Ministry of Railways
- Line: Karachi–Peshawar Railway Line
- Platforms: 2
- Tracks: 2

Construction
- Parking: Available
- Accessible: Available

Other information
- Station code: GRT

Services
Preceding station	Pakistan Railways	Following station
Haripur Band towards Kiamari	Karachi–Peshawar Line	Deona Juliani towards Peshawar Cantonment
Location

Gujrat Railway Station (Urdu and Punjabi: گجرات ریلوے اسٹیشن) is located in Gujrat city, Gujrat District of Punjab province, Pakistan. It is an important station on Karachi–Peshawar Railway Line. The railway station serves the city of Gujrat and its surroundings. Almost all the passenger trains that run between Lahore and Rawalpindi make a stop in this station. The station has an overhead bridge for motorcyclists.

== Gallery ==
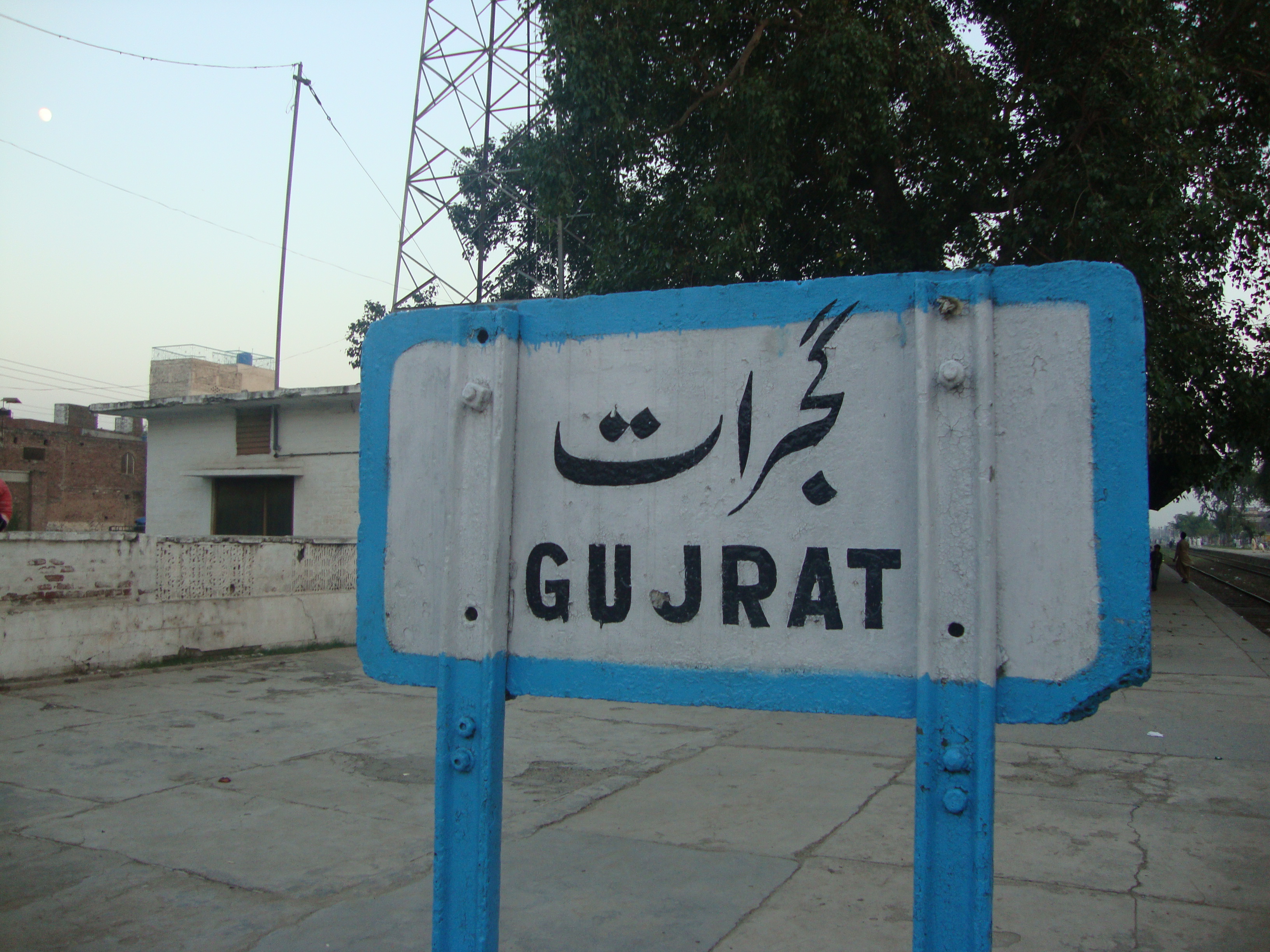
Gujrat Railway Station's Information Tile

View From the cross over bridge, Gujrat Railway Station

Platform No 1 of Gujrat Railway Station

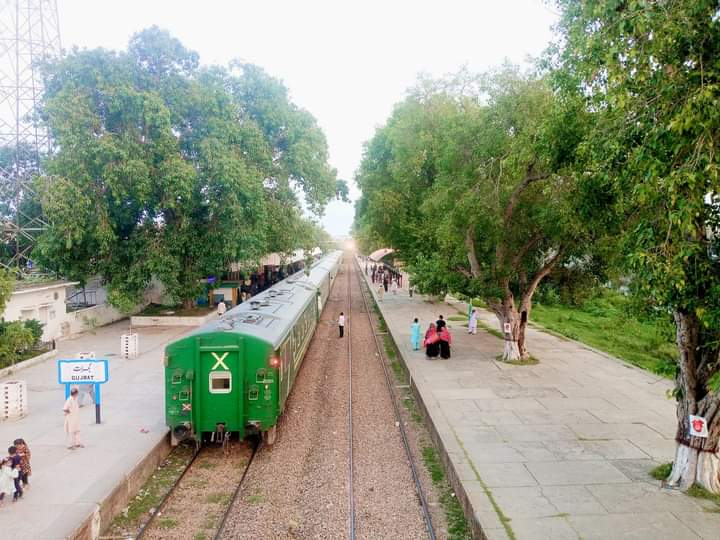
Gujrat Railway Station

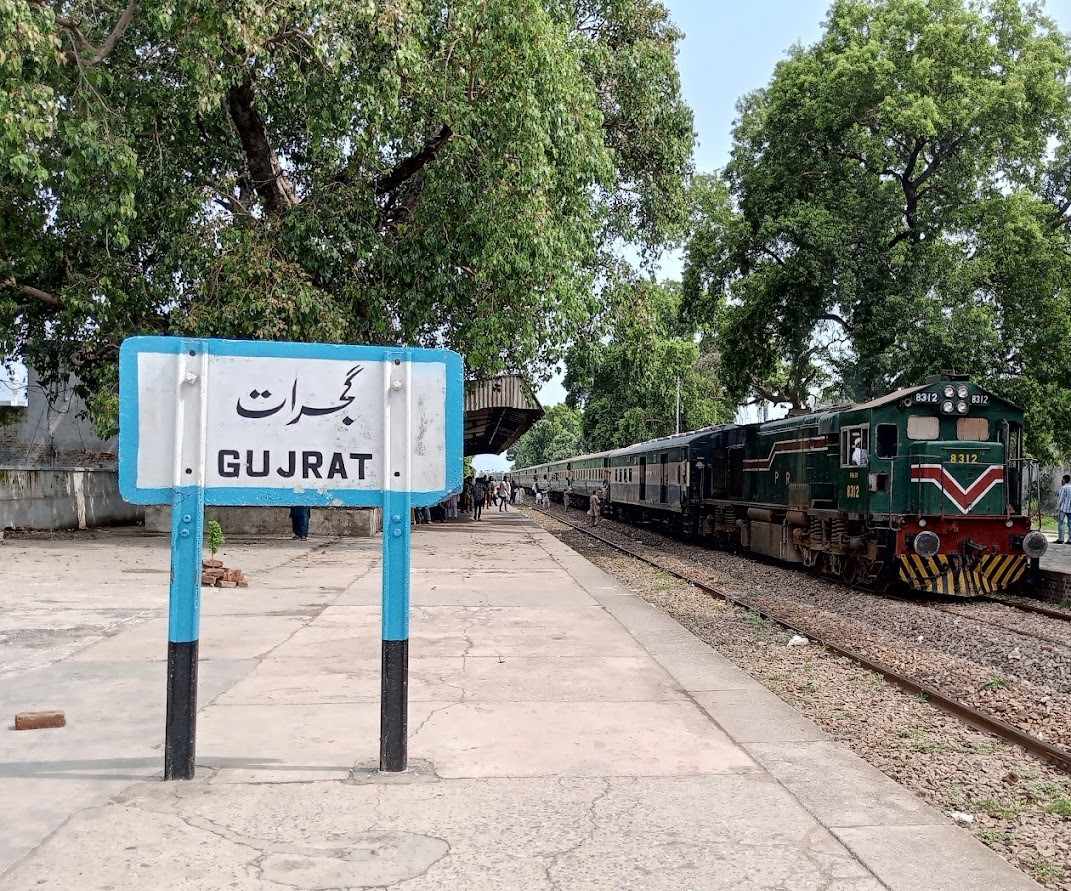

== See also ==
- List of railway stations in Pakistan
- Pakistan Railways
