= Mian Channun railway station =

Railway station in Punjab, Pakistan

Mian Channun Railway Station میاں چنوں ریلوے اسٹیشن

General information
- Coordinates: 30.4377°N 72.3577°E
- Owner: Ministry of Railways
- Line: Karachi–Peshawar Railway Line

Other information
- Station code: MYH

History
- Opened: 1880

Services
Preceding station	Pakistan Railways	Following station
Mohsinwal towards Kiamari	Karachi–Peshawar Line	Kassowal towards Peshawar Cantonment
Location

Mian Channun Railway Station (Urdu: میاں چنوں ریلوے اسٹیشن, Punjabi: میاں چنوں ریلوے اسٹیشن) is located in Mian Channun city, Khanewal district of Punjab province of the Pakistan.

== See also ==
- List of railway stations in Pakistan
- Pakistan Railways
