= Bostan, Pishin =

Bostan بوستان
- Location within Pakistan
- Coordinates: 30.25°N 67.0°E
- Country: Pakistan
- Province: Balochistan
- Elevation: 1,593 m (5,226 ft)
- Time zone: UTC+5 (PST)

Bostan (بوستان) is a town, 30 km by road (18.64 mi) from Quetta city in the Balochistan province of Pakistan. It is located at (30°25'57N, 67°00'22E) and has an altitude of 1,593 metres (5,229 feet). Bostan is Tehsil of the Pishin District. It was previously included in Tehsil Karezat and covers an area between Mount Takathu and the Red Hills (Bostan clay).

== History ==
This region was named after Bostan, who was a tribal leader and head of the Panezai clan of the Kakar tribe. Bostan took part in the First Anglo-Afghan War (1839–1842). During the British era, Bostan Junction railway station was a noted railway junction connecting Quetta with Zhob, Harnai and Chaman. Bostan and Zhob were connected by a narrow gauge railway track which was later dismantled by Panjab through the Pashtun leader Nawab Muhammad Ayaz Jogizai in June of 2008.

The total length of this railway from Bostan to Zhob was 294 km, which made it the longest narrow gauge railway of the subcontinent during the 1920s. It had 11 stations in between including the Kan Mehtarzai station which was the highest station in Pakistan at an altitude of 2,224 meters (7,295 feet). For a long part of its journey, the railway followed the Zhob River and thus it was called the Zhob Valley Railway (ZVR).

=== Chronology of Bostan Zhob Railway ===
- 1916: Work started on Khanai – Hindubagh section of ZVR.
- 1 January 1921: 74.7 km (46.12 mi) long Khanai to Hindubagh Narrow gauge track was completed
- 2 May 1927: 62.93 km (38.85 mi) long Hindubagh to Qila Saifullah section of NG line was opened
- 15 January 1929: 143.62 km (88.66 mi) long Qila Saifullah to Fort Sandeman (now called Zhob) section of NG line was opened. Only goods traffic started on this section on this date.
- 15 July 1929: Passenger service started from Qila Saifullah to Fort Sandeman (now Zhob)
- 1932: Bostan Harnai track dismantled for political reasons
- 20 November 1939: 15.84 km (9.78 mi) long Khanai to Bostan Jn NG was opened
- 1985: Bostan to Zhob Narrow Gauge line was closed down for passenger service
- 1986: Bostan to Zhob Narrow Gauge line was closed down for freight service
- 2007–08: Narrow gauge track was uprooted and auctioned off for roughly Rs 300 million
