= Ghotki railway station =

Railway station in Ghotki, Pakistan

Ghotki Railway Station گھوٹکی ریلوے اسٹیشن گهوٽڪي ريلوي اسٽيشن

General information
- Coordinates: 27.9939°N 69.3135°E
- Owner: Ministry of Railways
- Line: Karachi–Peshawar Railway Line
- Platforms: 2
- Tracks: 4

Other information
- Station code: GHK

Services
Preceding station	Pakistan Railways	Following station
Mahesar towards Kiamari	Karachi–Peshawar Line	Sarhad towards Peshawar Cantonment
Location

Ghotki Railway Station (Urdu: گھوٹکی ریلوے اسٹیشن, Sindhi: گھوٽڪي ريلوي اسٽيشن) is located in Ghotki town, Ghotki district of Sindh province, Pakistan.

== See also ==
- Ghotki rail crash (disambiguation)
- List of railway stations in Pakistan
- Pakistan Railways
