= Pano Akil railway station =

Railway station in Pakistan

Pano Akil Railway Station پنوں عاقل ریلوے اسٹیشن پنو عا قل ريلوي اسٽيشن
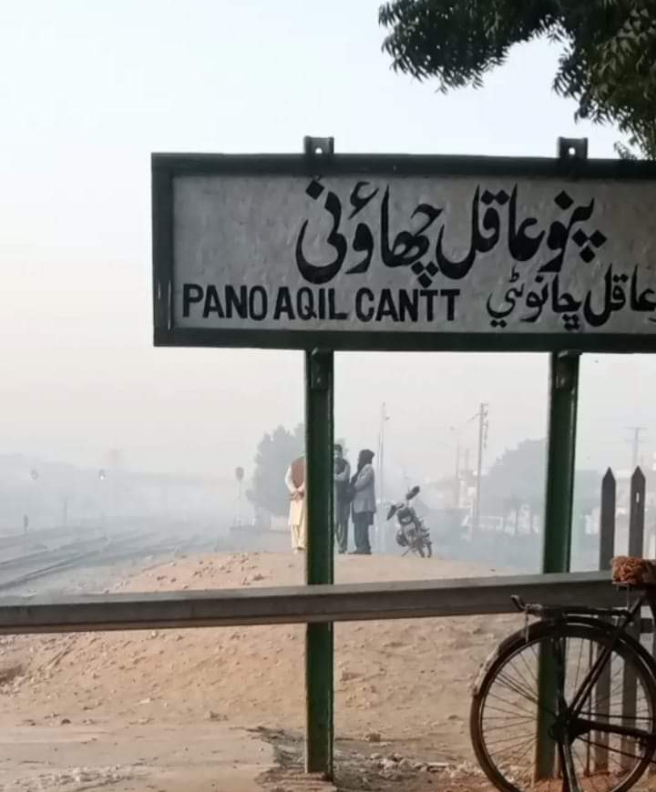

General information
- Coordinates: 27.8501°N 69.1147°E
- Owner: Ministry of Railways
- Line: Karachi–Peshawar Railway Line

Other information
- Station code: PNL

Services
Preceding station	Pakistan Railways	Following station
Sangi towards Kiamari	Karachi–Peshawar Line	Mahesar towards Peshawar Cantonment
Location

Pano Akil Railway Station (Urdu: پنوں عاقل ریلوے اسٹیشن, Sindhi: پنون عاقل ريلوي اسٽيشن) is located in Pano Akil, Sukkur district of Sindh province, Pakistan.

== See also ==
- List of railway stations in Pakistan
- Pakistan Railways
