= Wazirabad Junction railway station =

Railway station in Wazirabad, Pakistan

Wazirabad Junction Railway Station وزیرآباد جنکشن ریلوے اسٹیشن
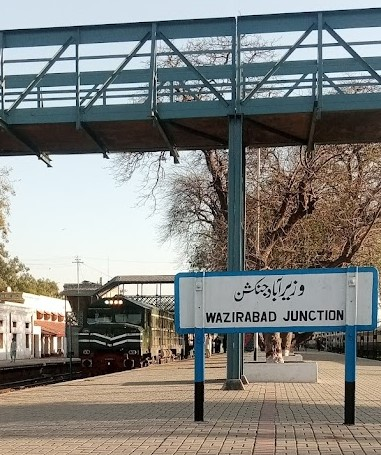

General information
- Coordinates: 32.446°N 74.112°E
- Elevation: 1,206 metres (3,957 ft)
- Owner: Ministry of Railways
- Lines: Karachi–Peshawar Railway Line; Khanewal–Wazirabad Branch Line; Wazirabad–Narowal Branch Line
- Platforms: 5

Construction
- Structure type: Standard (on ground station)
- Parking: Available
- Accessible: Available

Other information
- Station code: WZD

History
- Opened: 1918

Services
Preceding station	Pakistan Railways	Following station
Dhaunkal towards Kiamari	Karachi–Peshawar Line	Haripur Band towards Peshawar Cantonment
Mansurwali towards Khanewal Junction	Khanewal–Wazirabad Branch Line	Terminus
Terminus	Wazirabad–Narowal Branch Line	Sodhra Kopra towards Narowal Junction
Location

Wazirabad Junction Railway Station (Urdu, Punjabi: وزیرآباد جنکشن ریلوے اسٹیشن) is located in Wazirabad city, Wazirabad District of Punjab province of the Pakistan.

== History ==
Wazirabad Junction railway station was badly damaged in 1971 Indo-Pak war. After some time, it was renovated.

== See also ==
- List of railway stations in Pakistan
- Pakistan Railways

== Services ==
=== Trains that pass via Karachi - Peshawar Line ===
Trains that pass via Karachi - Peshawar Line
Train Number	Train Name	Origin	Destination	Arrival (Wazirabad)	Departure (Wazirabad)
01 UP	KHYBER MAIL	KARACHI CANTT	PESHAWAR CANTT	21:49	21:54
02 DN	KHYBER MAIL	PESHAWAR CANTT	KARACHI CANTT	05:20	05:23
07 UP	TEZGAM	KARACHI CANTT	RAWALPINDI	14:47	14:49
08 DN	TEZGAM	RAWALPINDI	KARACHI CANTT	11:30	11:32
13 UP	AWAM EXPRESS	KARACHI CANTT	PESHAWAR CANTT	08:55	08:57
14 DN	AWAM EXPRESS	PESHAWAR CANTT	KARACHI CANTT	15:55	15:57
39 UP	JAFFER EXPRESS	QUETTA	PESHAWAR CANTT	10:20	10:22
40 DN	JAFFER EXPRESS	PESHAWAR CANTT	QUETTA	13:46	13:48
101 UP	SUBAK RAFTAR EXPRESS	LAHORE	RAWALPINDI	08:27	08:29
102 DN	SUBAK RAFTAR EXPRESS	RAWALPINDI	LAHORE	10:20	10:22
103 UP	SUBAK KHARAM EXPRESS	LAHORE	RAWALPINDI	17:55	17:57
104 DN	SUBAK KHARAM EXPRESS	RAWALPINDI	LAHORE	20:12	20:14

=== Trains that pass via branch lines ===
Trains that pass via Karachi - Peshawar Line and Khanewal - Wazirabad Branch Line
Train Number	Train Name	Origin	Destination	Arrival (Wazirabad)	Departure (Wazirabad)
45 UP	PAKISTAN EXPRESS	KARACHI CANTT	RAWALPINDI	11:28	11:33
46 DN	PAKISTAN EXPRESS	RAWALPINDI	KARACHI CANTT	09:35	09:40
47 UP	REHMAN BABA EXPRESS	KARACHI CANTT	PESHAWAR CANTT	06:15	06:17
48 DN	REHMAN BABA EXPRESS	PESHAWAR CANTT	KARACHI CANTT	17:38	17:40

Trains passing via Wazirabad - Narowal Branch Line
Train Number	Train Name	Origin	Destination	Arrival (Wazirabad)	Departure (Wazirabad)
225 UP	SHAHEEN PASSENGER	WAZIRABAD	SIALKOT	NO DATA	
226 DN	SHAHEEN PASSENGER	SIALKOT	WAZIRABAD	NO DATA	
