= Rohri Junction railway station =

Major railway station in Pakistan

Rohri Junction Railway Station روہڑی جنکشن ریلوے اسٹیشن روهڙي جنڪشن ريلوي اسٽيشن

General information
- Location: Station Colony Road, Rohri, Sindh 65180
- Coordinates: 27.6853°N 68.8978°E
- Owner: Ministry of Railways
- Lines: Karachi–Peshawar Railway Line; Rohri-Chaman Railway Line

Construction
- Parking: Available
- Accessible: Available

Other information
- Station code: ROH

Services
Preceding station	Pakistan Railways	Following station
Begmanji towards Kiamari	Karachi–Peshawar Line	Mando Dairo towards Peshawar Cantonment
Terminus	Rohri–Chaman Line	Sukkur towards Chaman
Location
- Location within Sindh Location within Pakistan

Rohri Junction Railway Station (Urdu: روہڑی جنکشن ریلوے اسٹیشن, Sindhi: روهڙي جنڪشن ریلوي اسٽیشن) is located in Rohri, Sukkur district of Sindh province, Pakistan. It is a major railway station on the Pakistan Railways network, serving as the junction between the Karachi–Peshawar Railway Line (ML-1) and Rohri-Chaman Railway Line (ML-3). The station serves as a technical stop for all express and passenger trains. The station is staffed and has advance and current reservation offices. Food stalls are also located on all of its four active platforms. The land of the station is taken on lease for 100 years from Nawab Mir Yakoob Ali Shah.

== Train routes ==
The routes are Rohri from linked to Karachi, Lahore, Rawalpindi, Peshawar, Quetta, Multan, Faisalabad, Sargodha, Jhang, Hyderabad, Sukkur, Rahim Yar Khan, Bahawalpur, Gujrat, Gujranwala, Khanewal, Nawabshah, Larkana, Sibi, Attock and Nowshera

== Services ==
The following trains stop at Rohri Junction station:

Preceding station	Pakistan Railways	Following station
Mehrabpur Junction towards Karachi Cantonment	Allama Iqbal Express	Ghotki towards Sialkot Junction
Khairpur towards Karachi Cantonment	Awam Express	Pano Akil towards Peshawar Cantonment
Mehrabpur Junction towards Karachi City	Bahauddin Zakaria Express	Ghotki towards Multan Cantonment
Mehrabpur Junction towards Karachi City	Fareed Express	Sadiqabad towards Lahore Junction
Hyderabad Junction towards Karachi Cantonment	Green Line Express	Bahawalpur towards Islamabad
Mehrabpur Junction towards Karachi City	Hazara Express	Pano Akil towards Havelian
Nawabshah towards Karachi Cantonment	Karachi Express	Bahawalpur towards Lahore Junction
Hyderabad towards Karachi City	Karakoram Express	Bahawalpur towards Lahore Junction
Khairpur towards Karachi Cantonment	Khyber Mail	Pano Akil towards Peshawar Cantonment
Mehrabpur Junction towards Karachi Cantonment	Millat Express	Sadiqabad towards Malakwal Junction
Padidan towards Karachi Cantonment	Pakistan Express	Ghotki towards Rawalpindi
Nawabshah towards Karachi Cantonment	Shalimar Express	Ghotki towards Lahore Junction
Khairpur towards Karachi City	Sukkur Express	Sukkur towards Jacobabad Junction
Khairpur towards Karachi Cantonment	Tezgam	Rahim Yar Khan towards Rawalpindi

== Workshop ==
A railway workshop is located near the station, which is locally known as Loco Shed. It is used to clean carriages of the railway, maintenance of engines, and related work.

== See also ==
- List of railway stations in Pakistan
- Pakistan Railways
