= Kotri–Attock Line =

Main railway line in Pakistan

Kotri–Attock Railway Line کوٹری–اٹک مرکزی ریل راستہ

Overview
- Other name(s): Main Line 2 ML-2
- Owner: Pakistan Railways
- Termini: Kotri Junction; Attock City Junction
- Stations: 92

Service
- Operator: Pakistan Railways

History
- Opened: 1896; 130 years ago

Technical
- Line length: 1,246 km (774 mi)
- Track gauge: 1,676 mm (5 ft 6 in)
- Operating speed: 30 km/h (19 mph) to 70 km/h (43 mph)

Kotri–Attock Railway Line (Urdu: کوٹری–اٹک مرکزی ریل راستہ) (also referred to Main Line 2 or ML-2) is one of five main railway lines in Pakistan, operated and maintained by Pakistan Railways. The line begins from Kotri Junction and ends at Attock City Junction. The total length of this railway line is 1,246 kilometers (774 mi). There are 92 operational railway stations from Kotri Junction to Attock City Junction on this line.

== History ==
The present-day Kotri–Attock Railway Line was built as a patchwork of different railways during the 19th and 20th centuries by North Western State Railway and Pakistan Railways. The present day line consists of the following historic lines:

- Mari–Attock Railway

The Mari–Attock Railway opened in 1891 as a 1,676 mm (5 ft 6 in) broad gauge railway line between Mari Indus and Attock. In 1895 it was extended to Mianwali.

- Jacobabad–Kashmor Railway

The Jacobabad–Kashmor Railway (also known as the Upper Sind Light Railway) opened in 1914 as a 762 mm (2 ft 6 in) narrow gauge railway line between Jacobabad and Kashmore.

- Larkana–Jacobabad Light Railway

The Larkana–Jacobabad Light Railway (also known as the Sind Light Railway) opened in 1924 as a 762 mm (2 ft 6 in) narrow gauge railway line between Larkana and Jacobabad.

In 1956, Pakistan Western Railway converted the all 3 sections from 762 mm (2 ft 6 in) narrow gauge to 1,676 mm (5 ft 6 in) broad gauge. Between 1969 and 1973, Pakistan Western Railways completed the gap section between Kashmore–Mari Indus and the line was also extended from Larkana to Kotri, thus linking Kotri to Attock. In 2010, this line was designated Main Line 2 by Pakistan Railways to provide an alternative North–South route to the heavily used Karachi–Peshawar Railway Line.

== Stations ==
The stations on this line are as follows:

- Kotri Junction
- Sindh University
- Cadet College Petaro
- Unarpur (Abandoned)
- Budhapur
- Khanot
- Gopang
- Manjhand
- Sann
- Amri
- Laki Shah Saddar
- Bago Toro (Abandoned)
- Sehwan Sharif
- Channa Halt (Abandoned)
- Bubak Road
- Bhan Saydabad
- Khudabad
- Yar Muhammad Kalhoro Halt (Abandoned)
- Dadu
- Makhdum Sahib Halt (Abandoned)
- Phulji
- Ibrahim Kachhi Halt (Abandoned)
- Piaro Goth
- Rahuja (Abandoned)
- Rehmani Nagar
- Shah Murtaza Halt (Abandoned)
- Balishah
- Shah Panjo Halt
- Radhan
- Sihar Halt
- Badah
- Mohenjodaro
- Bakhsh Jatoi (Abandoned)
- Haidar Jatoi (Abandoned)
- Bakrani Road
- Mashori Sharif (Abandoned)
- Larkana Junction
- Brohi (Abandoned)
- Mahota (Abandoned)
- Shah Nawaz Bhutto
- Nasrat (Abandoned)
- Madeji Road
- Ruk
- Habib Kot Junction
- Haji Muhammad Ihan Halt (Abandoned)
- Shikarpur
- Shaheed Allah Bakhsh (Abandoned)
- Sultankot
- Humayun (Abandoned)
- Abad
- Adam Khan (Abandoned)
- Jacobabad Junction
- Dilmurad (Abandoned)
- Thul Nao (Abandoned)
- Mir Hassan Khoso Halt (Abandoned)
- Bijirani (Abandoned)
- Haibat Shaheed
- Kandkot
- Zorgarh (Abandoned)
- Bakhshapur
- Mir Dost Ali (Abandoned)
- Kashmor Colony
- Shahwali
- Basti Abdullah (Abandoned)
- Wali Mazari (Abandoned)
- Rojhan
- Badil Mazari (Abandoned)
- Kot Behram
- Murghal (Abandoned)
- Mithan Kot
- Kotla Nasir (Abandoned)
- Rajanpur
- Kotla Issan (Abandoned)
- Fazilpur Dhandi
- Hamunwala (Abandoned)
- Muhammad Pur Diwan (Abandoned)
- Azmatwala (Abandoned)
- Jampur
- Basti Fauja (Abandoned)
- Kot Chutta
- Paigah (Abandoned)
- Dera Ghazi Khan
- Yaroo Khosa (Abandoned)
- Dost Muhammad Khan (Abandoned)
- Basti Darwesh Lashari
- Basti Rehman (Abandoned)
- Shadan Lund
- Taunsa Barrage
- Taunsa Barrage Colony (Abandoned)
- Kot Adu Junction
- Dera Dinpanah
- Ashanpur
- Paharpur Thal (Abandoned)
- Kot Sultan
- Kharal Azam (Abandoned)
- Jaman Shah
- Leiah
- Kotla Haji Shah (Abandoned)
- Dorata
- Rajan Shah (Abandoned)
- Karor
- Samtiah (Abandoned)
- Sadan Sawaya (Abandoned)
- Behal
- Notak
- Sultan Karori (Abandoned)
- Bhakkar
- Kotla Jam (Abandoned)
- Darya Khan
- Panj Girain
- Shah Alam
- Maibal Halt
- Kallur Kot
- Tiba Meharaban Shah (Abandoned)
- Piplan
- Bhumb (Abandoned)
- Alluwali
- Khanqah Sirajia (Abandoned)
- Kundian Junction
- Sumbal Hamid
- Mianwali
- Biruli (Abandoned)
- Samand wala
- Pai Khel
- Dher Ummed Ali (Abandoned)
- Daud Khel Junction
- Massan
- Sohan Bridge
- Makhad Road
- Injra
- Khattakabad Halt
- Chhab
- Jhamat
- Uchhri
- Jand Junction
- Langar Halt
- Chura Sharif Halt
- Nammal
- Domel
- Basal Junction
- Sulemanabad
- Jhalar
- Kanjur
- Attock City Junction

== See also ==
- Karachi–Peshawar Railway Line
- Railway lines in Pakistan
