= Attock Passenger =

Pakistani express train

Overview
- Service type: Inter-city rail
- First service: 1988
- Current operator: Pakistan Railways

Route
- Termini: Mari Indus; Attock City Junction
- Stops: 19
- Distance travelled: 135 kilometres (84 mi)
- Average journey time: 4 hours, 26 minutes
- Service frequency: Daily
- Train numbers: 201UP (Mari Indus→Attock City); 202DN (Attock City→Mari Indus)

On-board services
- Class: Economy
- Sleeping arrangements: Not Available
- Catering facilities: Not Available

Technical
- Track gauge: 1,676 mm (5 ft 6 in)
- Track owner: Pakistan Railways

Attock Passenger (Urdu: اٹک مسافر) is a passenger train operated daily by Pakistan Railways between Mari Indus and Attock. The trip takes 4 hours and 26 minutes to cover a published distance of 135 kilometres (84 mi), making 19 stops while traveling along a stretch of the Kotri–Attock Railway Line.

== Route ==
- Mari Indus–Attock City Junction via Kotri–Attock Railway Line

== Station stops ==
- Mari Indus
- Daud Khel Junction
- Massan
- Makhad Road
- Injra
- Khattakabad
- Chhab
- Jhamat
- Uchhri
- Jand Junction
- Langar
- Chura Sharif Halt
- Nammal
- Domel
- Basal Junction
- Sulaimanabad
- Jhalar
- Kanjur
- Attock City Junction

== Equipment ==
Attock Passenger only offers economy class seating.
