= Jand Passenger =

Pakistani passenger train

Overview
- Service type: Inter-city rail
- First service: 1998
- Current operator: Pakistan Railways

Route
- Termini: Jand Junction; Attock City Junction
- Stops: 10
- Distance travelled: 69 kilometres (43 mi)
- Average journey time: 1 hour, 25 minutes
- Service frequency: Daily
- Train numbers: 203UP (Jand→Attock City); 204DN (Attock City→Jand)

On-board services
- Class: Economy
- Sleeping arrangements: Not Available
- Catering facilities: Not Available

Technical
- Track gauge: 1,676 mm (5 ft 6 in)
- Track owner: Pakistan Railways

Jand Passenger (Urdu: جند مسافر) is a passenger train operated daily by Pakistan Railways between Jand and Attock. The trip takes approximately 1 hour and 25 minutes to cover a published distance of 135 kilometres (84 mi), traveling along a stretch of the Kotri–Attock Railway Line.

== Route ==
- Jand Junction–Attock City Junction via Kotri–Attock Railway Line

== Station stops ==
- Jand Junction
- Langar
- Chura Sharif Halt
- Nammal
- Domel
- Basal Junction
- Sulaimanabad
- Jhalar
- Kanjur
- Attock City Junction

== Equipment ==
The train has economy accommodations.
