= Larkana–Jacobabad Light Railway =

Railway line in Pakistan

Larkana–Jacobabad Light Railway لاڑکانہ – جیکب آباد لائٹ ریلوے

Overview
- Status: Closed
- Owner: Pakistan Railways
- Termini: Larkana Junction; Jacobabad Junction
- Stations: 15

Service
- Operator: Pakistan Railways

History
- Opened: 1924
- Closed: 2005

Technical
- Line length: 136 km (85 mi)
- Track gauge: 762 mm (2 ft 6 in)

The Larkana–Jacobabad Light Railway (Urdu: لاڑکانہ – جیکب آباد فرعی ریلوے) was one of several branch lines in Pakistan, operated and maintained by Pakistan Railways. The line began at Larkana Junction and ended at Jacobabad Junction. The total length of this railway line is 136 kilometers (85 mi) with 14 railway stations.

== History ==
The Larkana–Jacobabad Light Railway (also known as the Sind Light Railway and Sindh Right Bank Feeder Railway) opened originally in 1924 as a 762 mm (2 ft 6 in) narrow gauge line by the North Western State Railway. From Larkana, the line extended west towards Shahdadkot then curved northeast towards Jacobabad. It followed the protective embankment of the Sindh Right Bank.

== Conversion to broad gauge and closure ==
In 1956, the Larkana-Shadadkot section was converted by the Pakistan Western Railway into 1,676 mm (5 ft 6 in) broad gauge line. The section from Silra Shadadkot to Budapur was dismantled.

== Stations ==
- Larkana Junction
- Bero Chandia
- Pir Muhammad Metlo Halt
- Kambar
- Bahram Hathiun
- Shahdadkot
- Silra Shahdadkot
- Bhurgari
- Umed Ali Junejo
- Garhi Khairo
- Chachar
- Chang
- Mauladad
- Jacobabad Junction
