= Bolan Mail =

Pakistani train

Overview
- Service type: Inter-city rail
- First service: 1948
- Current operator: Pakistan Railways

Route
- Termini: Karachi City; Quetta
- Stops: 23
- Distance travelled: 916 kilometres (569 mi)
- Average journey time: 22 hours 55 minutes
- Service frequency: Two times in week
- Train numbers: 3UP (Karachi→Quetta); 4DN (Quetta→Karachi)

On-board services
- Seating arrangements: Available
- Sleeping arrangements: Available
- Catering facilities: Available
- Baggage facilities: Available

Technical
- Track gauge: 1,676 mm (5 ft 6 in)
- Operating speed: Mainline 3 Speed 45 kilometres per hour (28 mph): Mainline 2 Speed 55 kilometres per hour (34 mph); Mainline 1 Speed 110 kilometres per hour (68 mph)
- Track owner: Pakistan Railways
Route map
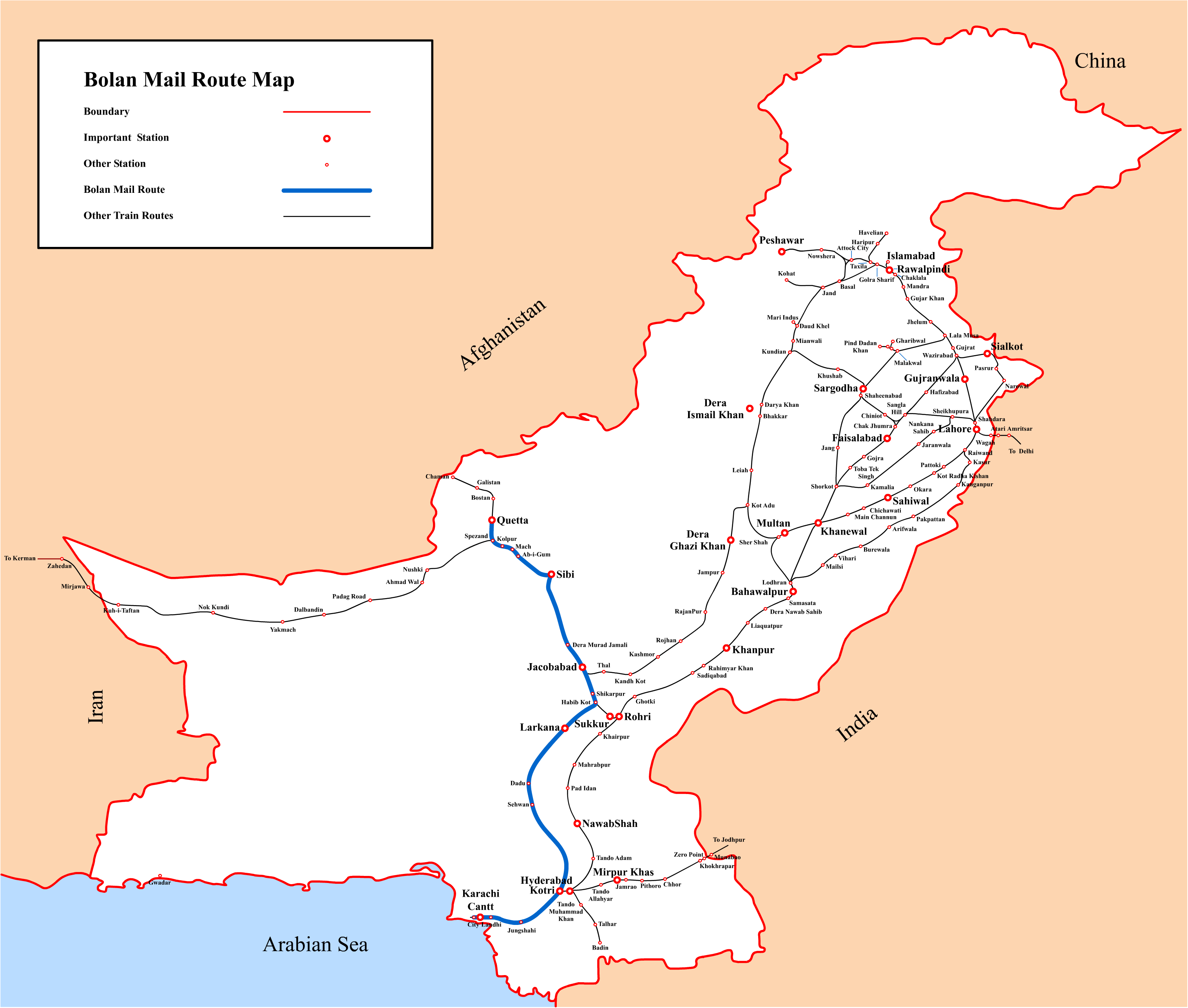

Bolan Mail (Urdu: بولان میل) is a passenger train operated daily by Pakistan Railways between Karachi and Quetta. The trip takes approximately 20 hours 25 minutes to cover a published distance of 916 kilometres (569 mi), running at 45 kilometres per hour (28 mph) and traveling along a stretch of the Karachi–Peshawar Railway Line, Kotri–Attock Railway Line and Rohri–Chaman Railway Line. The train is named after the famous Bolan Pass, a strategically located pass connecting to Central Asia. The train was cancelled after the 2022 floods, but service was restored on 25 December 2023. Currently, the train is running once every 2 days with only one rake. There is an AC dining car on the train.

== Incidents and accidents ==
- In April 2022, four people were injured after a collision.

== Route ==
- Karachi City–Kotri Junction via Karachi–Peshawar Railway Line
- Kotri Junction–Shikarpur via Kotri–Attock Railway Line
- Shikarpur–Quetta via Rohri–Chaman Railway Line

== Station stops ==
- Karachi City
- Karachi Cantonment
- Drigh Road
- Landhi Junction
- Jungshahi
- Braudabad
- Kotri Junction
- Sindh University
- Sehwan Sharif
- Dadu
- Radhan
- Larkana Junction
- Shah Nawaz Bhutto
- Shikarpur
- Jacobabad Junction
- Dera Allah Yar
- Dera Murad Jamali
- Bakhtiarabad Domki
- Sibi
- Aab-e-Gum
- Mach
- Kolpur
- Quetta

== Equipments ==
1	2	3	4	5	6	7	8	9	10	11	12
Power Van	AC Standard	AC Standard	Economy	Economy	Economy	Economy	Economy	Economy	Economy	Dining Car	Brake Van
