= Larkana Junction railway station =

Railway station in Pakistan

Larkana Junction لاڑکانہ جنکشن ریلوے اسٹیشن لاڙڪاڻو جنڪشن

General information
- Location: Station Road; Larkana, Sindh 77150
- Coordinates: 27.5486°N 68.2096°E
- Owner: Ministry of Railways
- Lines: Kotri–Attock Railway Line; Larkana–Jacobabad Light Railway

Other information
- Station code: LRK

History
- Opened: 1891

Services
Preceding station	Pakistan Railways	Following station
Mashori Sharif towards Kotri Junction	Kotri–Attock Line	Brohi towards Attock City Junction
Terminus	Larkana–Jacobabad Light Railway	Bero Chandia towards Jacobabad Junction
Location

Larkana Junction Railway Station (Urdu: لاڑکانہ جوڑ اسٹیشن, Sindhi: لاڙڪاڻو جنڪشن ريلوي اسٽيشن) is a railway station located in Larkana, Sindh, Pakistan. It was built in 1891. The station is staffed and has a booking office.

== Routes ==
The routes are Larkana from linked to Karachi, Lahore, Quetta, Peshawar, Rawalpindi, Nowshera, Hyderabad, Sibi, Sukkur, Attock, Mianwali, Dadu, Rahim Yar Khan, Shikarpur, Kotri, Rohri, Nawabshah and Jacobabad .

=== Services ===
Train Name	Train Code	Stations
Bolan Mail	3 UP, 4 DN	Quetta, Machh, Sibi, Jacobabad, Shikarpur, Larkana, Badah, Dadu, Sehwan Sharif, Kotri, Karachi
Khushal Khan Khatak Express	19 UP, 20 DN	Peshawar, Nowshera, Attock, Mianwali, Dera Ghazi Khan, Jacobabad, Larkana, Badah, Dadu, Karachi
Passenger	309 UP, 310 DN	Kotri, Sindh University, Sehwan Sharif, Dadu, Badah, Moenjo Daro, Larkana, Habib Kot, Sukkur, Rohri
Qalandar Express	165 UP, 166 DN	Larkana, Badah, Dadu, Sehwan Sharif, Sindh University, Kotri, Landhi, Drigh Road, Karachi

== See also ==
- Pakistan Railways
- List of railway stations in Pakistan
