= Maibal railway station =

Railway station in Pakistan

Maibal Railway Station میبل ریلوے اسٹیشن

General information
- Owner: Ministry of Railways
- Line: Kotri–Attock Railway Line
- Platforms: 2
- Tracks: 1861

Other information
- Station code: MBX

History
- Opened: 1887

Passengers
- 2020: 100daily ▲80%

Services
Preceding station	Pakistan Railways	Following station
Shah Alam towards Kotri Junction	Kotri–Attock Line	Kallur Kot towards Attock City Junction
Location

Maibal Railway Station (Urdu: میبل ریلوے اسٹیشن) is located in Pakistan.

== See also ==
- List of railway stations in Pakistan
- Pakistan Railways
