= Habib Kot Junction railway station =

Railway station in Pakistan

Habib Kot Junction Station حبیب کوٹ جنکشن ریلوے اسٹیشن حبيب ڪوٽ جنڪشن ريلوي اسٽيشن

General information
- Owner: Ministry of Railways
- Lines: Rohri-Chaman Railway Line; Kotri–Attock Railway Line

Other information
- Station code: HBKJ
- Fare zone: بيب

History
- Opened: 1946

Services
Preceding station	Pakistan Railways	Following station
Gosarji towards Rohri Junction	Rohri–Chaman Line	Shikarpur towards Chaman
Ruk towards Kotri Junction	Kotri–Attock Line	Shikarpur towards Attock City Junction
Location

Habib Kot Junction Railway Station (Urdu: حبیب کوٹ جنکشن ریلوے اسٹیشن, Sindhi: حبيب ڪوٽ جنڪشن ريلوي اسٽيشن) is located in Habib Kot village, Shikarpur district of Sindh province of the Pakistan. It is the junction of Kotri - Habib Kot via Dadu and Larkana branch railway line.

== See also ==
- List of railway stations in Pakistan
- Pakistan Railways
