= Bhan Sayadabad railway station =

Railway station in Pakistan

Coordinates: 26.55791°N 67.726725°E

Bhan Syedabad railway station ڀان سعيدآباد ريلوي اسٽيشن

General information
- Owner: Ministry of Railways

Other information
- Station code: BAN

Services
Preceding station	Pakistan Railways	Following station
Bubak Road towards Kotri Junction	Kotri–Attock Line	Khudabad towards Attock City Junction
Location

Bhan Syedabad railway station (Urdu: بھان سیدآباد ریلوے اسٹیشن, Sindhi: ڀان سعيدآباد ريلوي اسٽيشن) is located in the town of Bhan Syedabad, Pakistan, on the Kotri–Larkana railway track. In December 2017, the Shahbaz Express, Qalander Express and a local passenger train are closed, leaving only Khushal Khan Khttak and Bolan Mail in operation.

== See also ==
- List of railway stations in Pakistan
- Pakistan Railways
