= Bago Toro railway station =

Railway station in Pakistan

Coordinates: 26.4467°N 67.817283°E

Bago Toro Station

General information
- Owner: Ministry of Railways
- Line: Kotri–Attock Railway Line

Other information
- Station code: CHAN

Services
Preceding station	Pakistan Railways	Following station
Laki Shah Saddar towards Kotri Junction	Kotri–Attock Line	Sehwan Sharif towards Attock City Junction
Location

Bago Toro railway station is located in Jamshoro District Sindh Pakistan.. The station is no longer in operation and its building sits abandoned.

== See also ==
- List of railway stations in Pakistan
- Pakistan Railways
