= Meting (disambiguation) =

Meting is a small town in Sindh province of Pakistan.

Meting may also refer to:

- Measurement
- Meting railway station
