= Badli Mazari railway station =

Railway station in Pakistan

Coordinates: 28°46′N 70°04′E

Badli Mazari Station بدلی مزاری ریلوے اسٹیشن

General information
- Owner: Ministry of Railways
- Line: Kotri–Attock Railway Line

Other information
- Station code: BIZI

Services
Preceding station	Pakistan Railways	Following station
Rajanpur towards Kotri Junction	Kotri–Attock Line	Fazilpur Dhandi towards Attock City Junction
Location

Badli Mazari Railway Station (Urdu: بدلی مزاری ریلوے اسٹیشن) is located in Pakistan.

== See also ==
- List of railway stations in Pakistan
- Pakistan Railways
