= Basti Rahman railway station =

Railway station in Pakistan

General information
- Owner: Ministry of Railways

Other information
- Station code: BRN

History
- Former names: Great Indian Peninsula Railway

Basti Rahman railway station (Urdu: بستی رحمان ریلوے اسٹیشن) is located in Pakistan. It is along the railway between Kot Adu and Dera Ghazi Khan, and was constructed in the late 1960s.

== See also ==
- List of railway stations in Pakistan
- Pakistan Railways
