= Mahota railway station =

Railway station in Pakistan

Mahiota Railway Station ماہوٹا ریلوے اسٹیشن ماهوٽا ريلوي اسٽيشن

General information
- Owner: Ministry of Railways
- Line: Kotri–Attock Railway Line

Other information
- Station code: MHM

Services
Preceding station	Pakistan Railways	Following station
Shah Nawaz Bhutto towards Kotri Junction	Kotri–Attock Line	Ruk towards Attock City Junction
Location

Mahota Railway Station (Urdu: ماہوٹا ریلوے اسٹیشن, Sindhi: ماھوٽا ريلوي اسٽيشن) is located in Village Mahota, Sindh, Pakistan.

== See also ==
- List of railway stations in Pakistan
- Pakistan Railways
