= Abad railway station =

Railway station in Pakistan

Abad Railway Station آباد ریلوے اسٹیشن آباد ريلوي اسٽيشن

General information
- Coordinates: 28.1924°N 68.5192°E
- Owner: Ministry of Railways

Other information
- Station code: AAD

Services
Preceding station	Pakistan Railways	Following station
Sultankot towards Rohri Junction	Rohri–Chaman Line	Jacobabad Junction towards Chaman
Sultankot towards Kotri Junction	Kotri–Attock Line	Jacobabad Junction towards Attock City Junction
Location

Abad Railway Station (Urdu: آباد ریلوے اسٹیشن, Sindhi: آباد ریلوي اسٽیشن) is located in Abad village, Jacobabad district of Sindh province of the Pakistan.

== See also ==
- List of railway stations in Pakistan
- Pakistan Railways
