= Badah railway station =

Railway station in Pakistan

Badah Station باڈہ ریلوے اسٹیشن باڊھ ريلوي اسٽيشن

General information
- Coordinates: 27.3292°N 68.0292°E
- Owner: Ministry of Railways
- Line: Kotri–Attock Railway Line

Other information
- Station code: BDR

Services
Preceding station	Pakistan Railways	Following station
Sihar towards Kotri Junction	Kotri–Attock Line	Mohenjo-daro towards Attock City Junction
Location

Badah railway station (Urdu: باڈہ ریلوے اسٹیشن, Sindhi: باڊھ ريلوي اسٽيشن) is located in Pakistan.

== See also ==
- List of railway stations in Pakistan
- Pakistan Railways
