= Shah Panjo Halt railway station =

Railway station in Pakistan

Shah Panjo Halt Station شاہ پنجو ہالٹ اسٹیشن شاھ پنجو هالٽ اسٽيشن

General information
- Coordinates: 27.1408°N 67.9360°E
- Owner: Ministry of Railways
- Line: Kotri–Attock Railway Line

Other information
- Station code: SPJO

Services
Preceding station	Pakistan Railways	Following station
Balishah towards Kotri Junction	Kotri–Attock Line	Radhan towards Attock City Junction
Location

Shah Panjo Halt railway station (Urdu: شاہ پنجو ر ہالٹ یلوے اسٹیشن, Sindhi: شاھ پنجو ریلوي اسٽیشن) is located in Pakistan.

== See also ==
- List of railway stations in Pakistan
- Pakistan Railways
