= Piplan railway station =

Railway station in Punjab, Pakistan

Piplan Railway Station پپلاں ریلوے اسٹیشن

General information
- Coordinates: 32.2924°N 71.3684°E
- Owner: Ministry of Railways
- Line: Kotri–Attock Railway Line

Other information
- Station code: PPL

Services
| Preceding station | Pakistan Railways | Following station |
|---|---|---|
| Kallur Kot towards Kotri Junction | Kotri–Attock Line | Alluwali towards Attock City Junction |
Location

Piplan Railway Station (Urdu: پپلاں ریلوے اسٹیشن) is located in Piplan, Mianwali, Punjab, Pakistan.

== See also ==
- List of railway stations in Pakistan
- Pakistan Railways
