= Muhammad Pur Diwan railway station =

Railway station in Pakistan

Muhammad Pur Diwan Station محمد پور دیوان ریلوے اسٹیشن

General information
- Coordinates: 29.4784°N 70.4934°E
- Owner: Ministry of Railways

Other information
- Station code: MRDN

Services
Preceding station	Pakistan Railways	Following station
Fazilpur Dhandi towards Kotri Junction	Kotri–Attock Line	Azmatwala towards Attock City Junction
Location

Muhammad Pur Diwan Railway Station (Urdu: محمد پور دیوان ریلوے اسٹیشن, Punjabi: محمد پور دیوان ریلوے اسٹیشن) is located in Pakistan.

== See also ==
- List of railway stations in Pakistan
- Pakistan Railways
