= Alluwali railway station =

Railway station in Pakistan

Alluwali Railway Station علو والی ریلوے اسٹیشن

General information
- Coordinates: 32.3650°N 71.4183°E
- Owner: Ministry of Railways
- Line: Kotri–Attock Railway Line

Other information
- Station code: AWI

Services
Preceding station	Pakistan Railways	Following station
Piplan towards Kotri Junction	Kotri–Attock Line	Khnqah Sirajia towards Attock City Junction
Location

The Alluwali Railway Station (Urdu: علو والی ریلوے اسٹیشن) is a railway station located in Punjab, Pakistan.

== See also ==
- List of railway stations in Pakistan
- Pakistan Railways
