= Basal, Attock =

Basal
- Village
- Location within Pakistan
- Coordinates: 33.5552°N 72.2556°E
- Country: Pakistan
- Province: Punjab
- District: Attock
- Tehsil: Jand
- Region: Jandal
- Time zone: UTC+5 (PST)

Basal (Urdu: بسال) is a village in Jand Tehsil of Attock district in the Punjab Province of Pakistan.

The village is prominent for having stations of Pakistan Railways, namely two small stations of Basal Sharif and Sulemanabad and the Basal Junction railway station.

== History ==
Basal village is named for "Baba Basa" which locals said.

== Education ==
There are several schools and colleges in Basal, including Government Degree College Basal, Fauji Foundation College Basal, Spirit School Basal, and Oxford Girls Science College Basal..
