= Khudabad railway station =

Railway station in Pakistan

Khudabad Station خداآباد ریلوے اسٹیشن خداآباد ريلوي اسٽيشن

General information
- Coordinates: 26°39′0″N 67°45′0″E
- Owner: Ministry of Railways
- Line: Kotri–Attock Railway Line

Other information
- Station code: KBW

Services
Preceding station	Pakistan Railways	Following station
Bhan Sayadabad towards Kotri Junction	Kotri–Attock Line	Dadu towards Attock City Junction
Location

Khudabad railway station (Urdu: خداآباد ریلوے اسٹیشن, Sindhi: خداآباد ریلوي اسٽیشن) is located Dadu District, Sindh in Pakistan.

== See also ==
- List of railway stations in Pakistan
- Pakistan Railways
