= Sohan Bridge railway station =

Railway station in Pakistan

Sohan Bridge Station سوہان برج ریلوے اسٹیشن

General information
- Owner: Ministry of Railways
- Line: Kotri–Attock Railway Line

Other information
- Station code: SON

Services
| Preceding station | Pakistan Railways | Following station |
|---|---|---|
| Massan towards Kotri Junction | Kotri–Attock Line | Makhad Road towards Attock City Junction |
Location

Sohan Bridge Railway Station (Urdu: سوہان برج ریلوے اسٹیشن) is located on the Kotri–Attock Railway Line in Punjab, Pakistan.

== See also ==
- List of railway stations in Pakistan
- Pakistan Railways
