= Bakhsh Jatoi railway station =

Railway station in Pakistan

Bakhsh Jatoi Station بخش جتوئی ریلوے اسٹیشن بخش جتوئي ريلوي اسٽيشن

General information
- Coordinates: 27.4099°N 68.0973°E
- Owner: Ministry of Railways

Other information
- Station code: BKJT

Services
Preceding station	Pakistan Railways	Following station
Mohenjo-daro towards Kotri Junction	Kotri–Attock Line	Bakrani Road towards Attock City Junction
Location

Bakhsh Jatoi railway station (Urdu: بخش جتوئي ریلوي اسٽیشن, Sindhi: بخش جتوئي ريلوي اسٽيشن) is located in Pakistan.

== See also ==
- List of railway stations in Pakistan
- Pakistan Railways
