= Rajan Shah railway station =

Railway station in Punjab, Pakistan

Rajan Shah Railway Station راجن شاہ ریلوے اسٹیشن

General information
- Coordinates: 31.145°N 70.953°E
- Owner: Ministry of Railways
- Line: Kotri–Attock Railway Line

Other information
- Station code: RJSH

Services
| Preceding station | Pakistan Railways | Following station |
|---|---|---|
| Leiah towards Kotri Junction | Kotri–Attock Line | Karor towards Attock City Junction |
Location

Rajan Shah Railway Station (Urdu: راجن شاہ ریلوے اسٹیشن) is located in Tehsil Karor Lal Esan, District Layyah, Punjab, Pakistan.

== See also ==
- List of railway stations in Pakistan
- Pakistan Railways
