= Paigah railway station =

Railway station in Pakistan

Paigah Railway Station پائیگاہ ریلوے اسٹیشن

General information
- Owner: Ministry of Railways
- Line: Kotri–Attock Railway Line

Other information
- Station code: PGHA

Services
| Preceding station | Pakistan Railways | Following station |
|---|---|---|
| Jampur towards Kotri Junction | Kotri–Attock Line | Dera Ghazi Khan towards Attock City Junction |
Location

Paigah Railway Station (Urdu: پائیگاہ ریلوے اسٹیشن) is located in Pakistan.

== See also ==
- List of railway stations in Pakistan
- Pakistan Railways
