= Karor railway station =

Railway station in Pakistan

Karor Lal Esan Station کروڑ ریلوے اسٹیشن

General information
- Owner: Ministry of Railways
- Line: Kotri–Attock Railway Line

Other information
- Station code: KOR

Services
Preceding station	Pakistan Railways	Following station
Rajan Shah towards Kotri Junction	Kotri–Attock Line	Notak towards Attock City Junction
Location

Karor Railway Station or Karor Lal Esan Railway Station (Urdu: کروڑ ریلوے اسٹیشن, Punjabi: کروڑ ریلوے اسٹیشن) is located in Karor Lal Esan, Pakistan.

== See also ==
- List of railway stations in Pakistan
- Pakistan Railways
