= Jhalar railway station =

Railway station in Pakistan

Coordinates: 33°38′N 72°20′E

Jhalar Railway Station جھلار ریلوے اسٹیشن
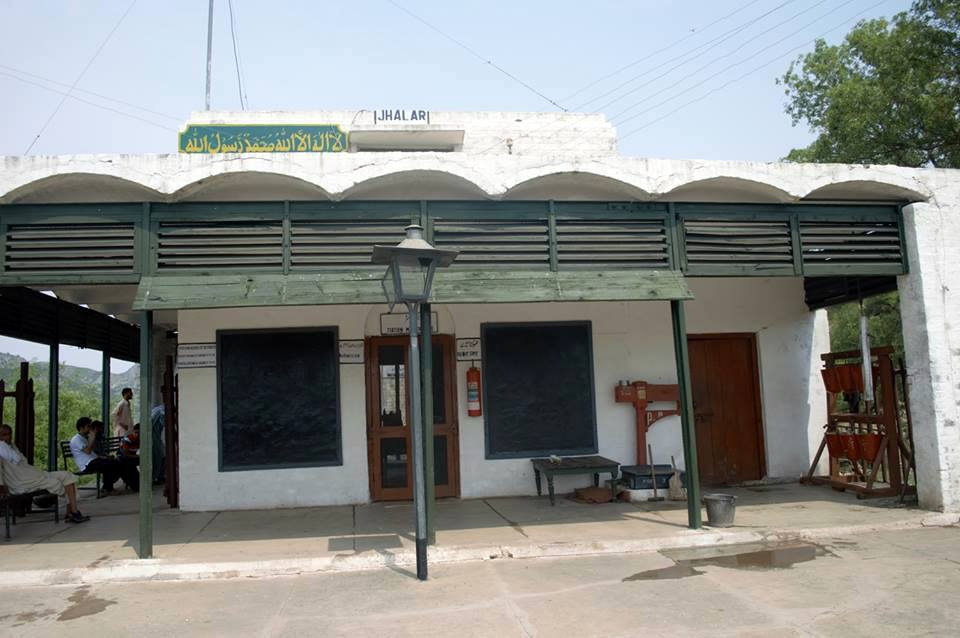

General information
- Owner: Ministry of Railways
- Line: Kotri–Attock Railway Line

Other information
- Station code: JRN

History
- Opened: 1891

Services
Preceding station	Pakistan Railways	Following station
Sulaimanabad towards Kotri Junction	Kotri–Attock Line	Kanjur towards Attock City Junction
Location

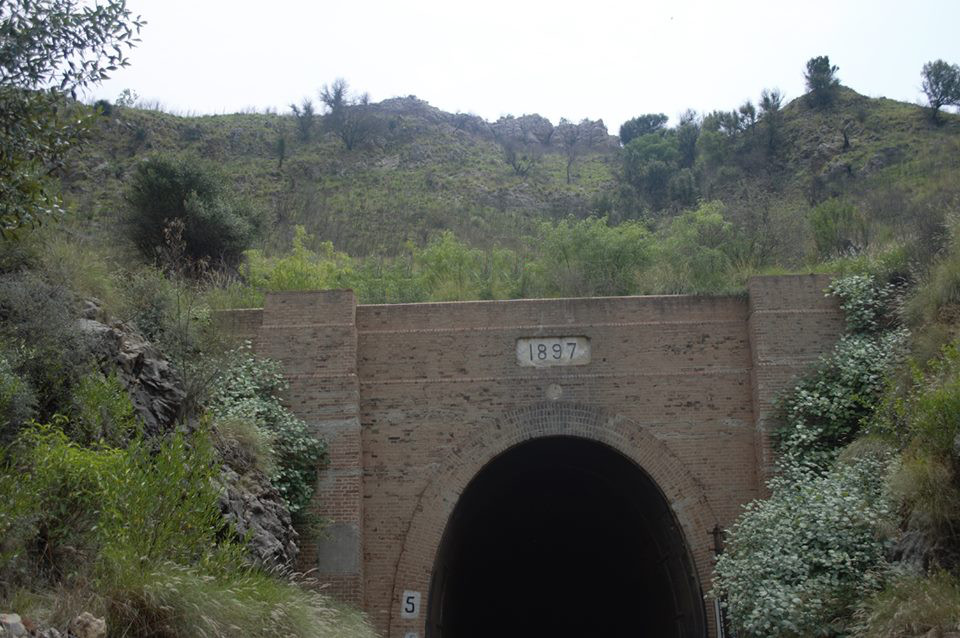
The Jhalar Tunnel

Jhalar Railway Station (Urdu: جھلار ریلوے اسٹیشن) is located in District Attock, Punjab, Pakistan on the railway track from Attock City Junction railway station to Basal Junction railway station.

== History ==
The Kotri–Attock Line was opened in 1891. Between Attock and Jhalar railway station, there is a beautiful hilly passage with seven long tunnels. The Jhalar tunnels, also known as "Seven Sisters", were built by the North Western Railway in 1895–97 during the British Raj.

== Station building and bungalows ==
There are a few old bungalows and quarters for the railway officials around the station building that were once populated by families of the station staff but now are just ruins.

== Facilities ==
The station still lacks electricity. The railway officials working there use the electricity generated and stored through solar panels for lighting at night.

== Services ==
Currently the Jhalar station is a stoppage of three trains:

- Jand Passenger
- Khushal Khan Khattak Express
- Attock Passenger

== See also ==
- List of railway stations in Pakistan
- Pakistan Railways
