= HMN =

HMN may refer to:

== Transport ==
- Hamilton railway station, New South Wales in Australia
- Hamilton station (Ohio) in the United States
- Hemmen-Dodewaard railway station, in the Netherlands
- Humayun railway station, in Pakistan
- Holloman Air Force Base, in New Mexico, United States
- Homerton railway station in London

== Other uses ==
- Health Metrics Network, an international health organization
- Hereditary motor neuropathies
- hmn, ISO 639-3 code for the Hmong language
- Hmongic languages, spoken in China, Laos, and Vietnam
- Isocetane (2,2,4,4,6,8,8-heptamethylnonane)
