= Kotla Jam railway station =

Railway station in Punjab, Pakistan

Kotla Jam Railway Station کوٹلہ جام ریلوے اسٹیشن

General information
- Coordinates: 31.7025°N 71.0957°E
- Owner: Ministry of Railways
- Line: Kotri–Attock Railway Line

Other information
- Station code: KJO

Services
Preceding station	Pakistan Railways	Following station
Bhakkar towards Kotri Junction	Kotri–Attock Line	Darya Khan towards Attock City Junction
Location

Kotla Jam Railway Station (Urdu: کوٹلہ جام ریلوے اسٹیشن, Punjabi: کوٹلہ جام ریلوے اسٹیشن) is located in Punjab, Pakistan.

== See also ==
- List of railway stations in Pakistan
- Pakistan Railways
