= Jampur railway station =

Railway station in Pakistan

Jampur Railway Station جامپور ریلوے اسٹیشن
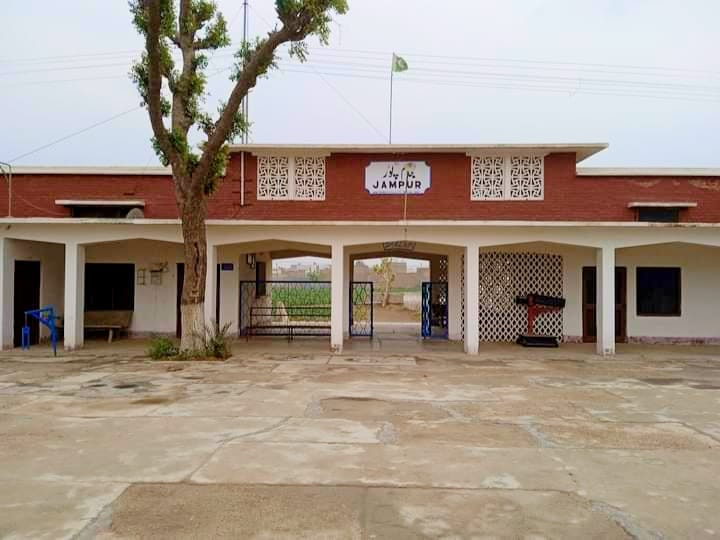

General information
- Coordinates: 29.6383°N 70.5775°E
- Owner: Ministry of Railways
- Line: Kotri–Attock Railway Line

Other information
- Station code: JMPR

History
- Opened: 1973

Services
Preceding station	Pakistan Railways	Following station
Azmatwala towards Kotri Junction	Kotri–Attock Line	Paigah towards Attock City Junction
Location

Jampur Railway Station (Urdu: جامپور ریلوے اسٹیشن, Punjabi: جامپور ریلوے اسٹیشن) is located in Pakistan. Jampur Railway Station was completed and opened for traffic in 1973.

The overall construction project for this specific railway section (the Kot Adu-Kashmore link) was carried out under the management of Pakistan Western Railways from 1969 to 1973.

== See also ==
- List of railway stations in Pakistan
- Pakistan Railways
