= Manjhand railway station =

Railway station in Pakistan

Manjhand Station مانجھنڈ اسٹیشن مانجهند ريلوي اسٽيشن

General information
- Coordinates: 25.9014°N 68.2300°E
- Owner: Ministry of Railways
- Line: Kotri–Attock Railway Line

Other information
- Station code: MJD

Services
Preceding station	Pakistan Railways	Following station
Budapur towards Kotri Junction	Kotri–Attock Line	Sann towards Attock City Junction
Location

Manjhand railway station (Urdu: مانجھند ریلوے اسٹیشن, Sindhi: مانجھند ريلوي اسٽيشن) is located in Jamshoro District of Sindh, Pakistan. The railway station is close to Manjhand town.

== See also ==
- List of railway stations in Pakistan
- Pakistan Railways
