= Rehmani Nagar railway station =

Railway station in Sindh, Pakistan

Rehmani Nagar Station رحمانی نگر ریلوے اسٹیشن رحماني نگر ریلوي اسٽیشن

General information
- Owner: Ministry of Railways
- Line: Kotri–Attock Railway Line

Other information
- Station code: RMNR

Services
Preceding station	Pakistan Railways	Following station
Piaro Goth towards Kotri Junction	Kotri–Attock Line	Balishah towards Attock City Junction
Location

Rehmani Nagar railway station (Urdu: رحمانی نگر ریلوے اسٹیشن, Sindhi: رحماني نگر ریلوي اسٽیشن) is located in Sindh, Pakistan.

== See also ==
- List of railway stations in Pakistan
- Pakistan Railways
