= Khnqah Sirajia railway station =

Railway station in Pakistan

Khnqah Sirajia Station خانقاہ سراجیہ ریلوے اسٹیشن

General information
- Coordinates: 32.4118°N 71.4549°E
- Owner: Ministry of Railways
- Line: Kotri–Attock Railway Line

Other information
- Station code: KQSA

Services
Preceding station	Pakistan Railways	Following station
Alluwali towards Kotri Junction	Kotri–Attock Line	Kundian Junction towards Attock City Junction
Location

Khnqah Sirajia Railway Station (Urdu: خانقاہ سراجیہ ریلوے اسٹیشن) is located in Pakistan.

== See also ==
- List of railway stations in Pakistan
- Pakistan Railways
