= Yaroo Khosa railway station =

Railway station in Pakistan

Yaroo Khosa Railway Station یارو کھوسہ ریلوے اسٹیشن

General information
- Coordinates: 30.164695°N 70.612515°E
- Owner: Ministry of Railways
- Line: Kotri–Attock Railway Line

Other information
- Station code: YAA

Services
Preceding station	Pakistan Railways	Following station
Dera Ghazi Khan towards Kotri Junction	Kotri–Attock Line	Basti Laghar towards Attock City Junction
Location

Yaroo Khosa Railway Station (Urdu: یارو کھوسہ ریلوے اسٹیشن) is located in Pakistan.

== See also ==
- List of railway stations in Pakistan
- Pakistan Railways
