= SHMT =

SHMT may refer to:

- Serine hydroxymethyltransferase, an enzyme
- Simultaneous and heterogeneous multithreading, in computing
- Shah Murtaza Halt railway station (Station code: SHMT), Pakistan

== See also ==
- Shanghai Maritime University (SMU or SHMTU), China
