= Ruk railway station =

Railway station in Sindh, Pakistan

Coordinates: 27.810698°N 68.660733°E

Ruk Railway Station رک ریلوے اسٹیشن رڪ ريلوي اسٽيشن

General information
- Owner: Ministry of Railways
- Line: Kotri–Attock Railway Line

Other information
- Station code: RUK

History
- Opened: 1898; 128 years ago

Services
Preceding station	Pakistan Railways	Following station
Mahota towards Kotri Junction	Kotri–Attock Line	Habib Kot Junction towards Attock City Junction
Location

Ruk Railway Station (Urdu: رک ریلوے اسٹیشن, Sindhi: رڪ ریلوي اسٽیشن) is a railway station located in Shikarpur District in Sindh, Pakistan. It was founded in 1898 in British India.

== See also ==
- List of railway stations in Pakistan
- Pakistan Railways
