= Bakrani Road railway station =

Railway station in Pakistan

Bakrani Road Station باکرانی روڈ ریلوے اسٹیشن باڪراڻي روڊ ريلوي اسٽيشن

General information
- Coordinates: 27.4582°N 68.1378°E
- Owner: Ministry of Railways
- Line: Kotri–Attock Railway Line

Other information
- Station code: BKR

Services
Preceding station	Pakistan Railways	Following station
Bakhsh Jatoi towards Kotri Junction	Kotri–Attock Line	Mashori Sharif towards Attock City Junction
Location

Bakrani Road Railway Station (Urdu: باکرانی روڈ ریلوے اسٹیشن, Sindhi: باڪراڻي روڊ ریلوي اسٽیشن) is located in Pakistan.

== See also ==
- List of railway stations in Pakistan
- Pakistan Railways
