= Sann railway station =

Railway station in Pakistan

Sann Station سن ریلوے اسٹیشن سن ريلوي اسٽيشن

General information
- Coordinates: 26.0202°N 68.1146°E
- Owner: Ministry of Railways
- Line: Kotri–Attock Railway Line

Other information
- Station code: SANN

Services
Preceding station	Pakistan Railways	Following station
Manjhand towards Kotri Junction	Kotri–Attock Line	Amri towards Attock City Junction
Location

Sann railway station (Urdu: سن ریلوے اسٹیشن, Sindhi: سن ریلوي اسٽیشن) is located in Pakistan.

== See also ==
- Pakistan Railways
