= Laki Shah Saddar railway station =

Railway station in Pakistan

Laki Shah Saddar لکی شاہ صدر ریلوے اسٹیشن لڪي شاھ ريلوي اسٽيشن

General information
- Coordinates: 26.2626°N 67.9032°E
- Owner: Ministry of Railways
- Line: Kotri–Attock Railway Line

Other information
- Station code: LSS

History
- Former names: Tirath Laki

Services
Preceding station	Pakistan Railways	Following station
Amri towards Kotri Junction	Kotri–Attock Line	Sehwan Sharif towards Attock City Junction
Location

Laki Shah Saddar railway station (Urdu: لکی شاہ صدر ریلوے اسٹیشن, Sindhi: لڪي شاہ صدر ریلوي اسٽیشن) is located in Laki Shah Saddar, Pakistan. Its old name was 'Tirath Laki'.

== See also ==
- Lakki hills
- List of railway stations in Pakistan
- Pakistan Railways
