= Azmatwala railway station =

Railway station in Pakistan

Coordinates: 29.572439°N 70.534149°E

Azmatwala Station عظمت والا ریلوے اسٹیشن

General information
- Owner: Ministry of Railways
- Line: Kotri–Attock Railway Line

Other information
- Station code: AZTL

Services
Preceding station	Pakistan Railways	Following station
Muhammad Pur Diwan towards Kotri Junction	Kotri–Attock Line	Jampur towards Attock City Junction
Location

Azmatwala Railway Station (Urdu: عظمت والا ریلوے اسٹیشن) is located in Pakistan.

== See also ==
- List of railway stations in Pakistan
- Pakistan Railways
