= Fazilpur Dhandi railway station =

Railway station in Punjab, Pakistan

Fazilpur Dhandi فاضل پور ڈھانڈی

General information
- Coordinates: 29.3012°N 70.4454°E
- Owner: Ministry of Railways
- Line: Kotri–Attock Railway Line

Other information
- Station code: FZDI

Services
Preceding station	Pakistan Railways	Following station
Badli Mazari towards Kotri Junction	Kotri–Attock Line	Muhammad Pur Diwan towards Attock City Junction
Location

Fazilpur Dhandi (Urdu: فاضل پور ڈھانڈی ریلوے اسٹیشن, Punjabi: فاضل پور ڈھانڈی ریلوے اسٹیشن) is a railway station located in Punjab, Pakistan.

== See also ==
- List of railway stations in Pakistan
- Pakistan Railways
