= Panj Girain railway station =

Railway station in Pakistan

Panj Girain Railway Station پنجگرائیں ریلوے اسٹیشن

General information
- Coordinates: 31.9175°N 71.1537°E
- Owner: Ministry of Railways
- Line: Kotri–Attock Railway Line

Other information
- Station code: PJG

Services
Preceding station	Pakistan Railways	Following station
Darya Khan towards Kotri Junction	Kotri–Attock Line	Shah Alam towards Attock City Junction
Location

Panj Girain Railway Station (Urdu: پنجگرائیں ریلوے اسٹیشن) is located in Punjgirain, Pakistan.

== See also ==
- List of railway stations in Pakistan
- Pakistan Railways
