= Unarpur railway station =

Railway station in Pakistan

Unarpur Station انڑپور ریلوے اسٹیشن انڙپور ريلوي اسٽيشن

General information
- Coordinates: 25.6061°N 68.3536°E
- Owner: Ministry of Railways
- Line: Kotri–Attock Railway Line

Other information
- Station code: UNR

Services
Preceding station	Pakistan Railways	Following station
Cadet Collage Petaro towards Kotri Junction	Kotri–Attock Line	Budapur towards Attock City Junction
Location

Unarpur railway station (Urdu: انڑپور ریلوے اسٹیشن, Sindhi: انڙپور ریلوي اسٽیشن) is located in Sindh, Pakistan.. The station building is now abandoned.

== See also ==
- List of railway stations in Pakistan
- Pakistan Railways
