= Mashori Sharif railway station =

Railway station in Pakistan

Mashori Sharif Station مشوری شریف ریلوے اسٹیشن مشوري شريف ريلوي اسٽيشن

General information
- Coordinates: 27.4882°N 68.1635°E
- Owner: Ministry of Railways

Other information
- Station code: MHSR

Services
Preceding station	Pakistan Railways	Following station
Bakrani Road towards Kotri Junction	Kotri–Attock Line	Larkana towards Attock City Junction
Location

Mashori Sharif Railway Station (Urdu: مشوری شریف ریلوے اسٹیشن, Sindhi: مشوري شریف ریلوي اسٽیشن) is located in Pakistan.

== See also ==
- List of railway stations in Pakistan
- Pakistan Railways
