= Sultan Kot railway station =

Railway station in Pakistan

Sultan Kot Railway Station سلطان کوٹ ریلوے اسٹیشن سلطان ڪوٽ ريلوي اسٽيشن

General information
- Coordinates: 28.0764°N 68.5967°E
- Owner: Ministry of Railways

Other information
- Station code: SOK

Services
| Preceding station | Pakistan Railways | Following station |
|---|---|---|
| Shikarpur towards Rohri Junction | Rohri–Chaman Line | Abad towards Chaman |
| Shikarpur towards Kotri Junction | Kotri–Attock Line | Abad towards Attock City Junction |
Location

Sultan Kot Railway Station (Urdu: سلطان کوٹ ریلوے اسٹیشن, Sindhi: سلطان ڪوٽ ریلوي اسٽیشن) is located in Sultan Kot village, Shikarpur district of Sindh province of the Pakistan.

== See also ==
- List of railway stations in Pakistan
- Pakistan Railways
