= Shah Alam railway station =

Railway station in Pakistan

Shah Alam Railway Station شاہ عالم ریلوے اسٹیشن

General information
- Coordinates: 31.9726°N 71.1740°E
- Owner: Ministry of Railways
- Line: Kotri–Attock Railway Line

Other information
- Station code: SAM

Services
Preceding station	Pakistan Railways	Following station
Panj Girain towards Kotri Junction	Kotri–Attock Line	Maibal towards Attock City Junction
Location

Shah Alam Railway Station (Urdu: شاہ عالم ریلوے اسٹیشن) is located in Pakistan.

== See also ==
- List of railway stations in Pakistan
- Pakistan Railways
