= Sihar Halt railway station =

Railway station in Sindh, Pakistan

Sihar Halt Station سحر ریلوے اسٹیشن سيهڙ ريلوي اسٽيشن

General information
- Coordinates: 27.2460°N 67.9876°E
- Owner: Ministry of Railways
- Line: Kotri–Attock Railway Line

Other information
- Station code: SHS

Services
Preceding station	Pakistan Railways	Following station
Radhan towards Kotri Junction	Kotri–Attock Line	Badah towards Attock City Junction
Location

Sihar Halt railway station (Urdu: سحر ریلوے اسٹیشن, Sindhi: سيھڙ ریلوي اسٽیشن) is located in Sindh, Pakistan.

== See also ==
- List of railway stations in Pakistan
- Pakistan Railways
