= Leiah railway station =

Railway station in Punjab, Pakistan

Layyah Railway Station لیہ ریلوے اسٹیشن
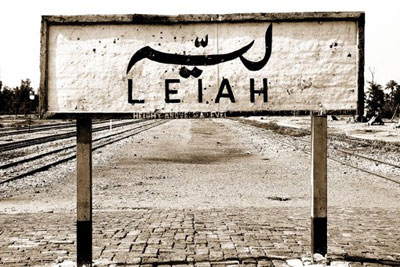
- Sign Post at the Leiah Railway Station

General information
- Coordinates: 30°58′5″N 70°56′36″E
- Owner: Ministry of Railways
- Line: Kotri–Attock Railway Line

Other information
- Station code: LAH

History
- Opened: 1887

Services
Preceding station	Pakistan Railways	Following station
Jaman Shah towards Kotri Junction	Kotri–Attock Line	Rajan Shah towards Attock City Junction
Location

Leiah Railway Station (also spelled Layyah) (Urdu: لیہ ریلوے اسٹیشن) is located in Layyah District in Punjab province of Pakistan on Kotri-Attock railway line. Three trains pass through this railway station. The routes of trains passing through here are from Karachi to Peshawar and Rawalpindi and from Multan to Rawalpindi.

== See also ==
- List of railway stations in Pakistan
- Pakistan Railways
