= Amri railway station =

Railway station in Pakistan

Amri Station آمری ریلوے اسٹیشن آمري ريلوي اسٽيشن

General information
- Coordinates: 26.1699°N 68.0087°E
- Owner: Ministry of Railways
- Line: Kotri–Attock Railway Line

Other information
- Station code: AMR

Services
Preceding station	Pakistan Railways	Following station
Sann towards Kotri Junction	Kotri–Attock Line	Laki Shah Saddar towards Attock City Junction
Location

Amri railway station (Urdu: آمری ریلوے اسٹیشن, Sindhi: آمري ریلوي اسٽیشن) is located in Pakistan.

== See also ==
- List of railway stations in Pakistan
- Pakistan Railways
