= MDAL (disambiguation) =

MDAL is the chemical abbreviation of the psychedelic drug Methylenedioxyallylamphetamine.

MDAL or mdal may also refer to:

- M.D. Al., an alternative abbreviation for the United States District Court for the Middle District of Alabama
- MDAL, abbreviation for Mir Dostali railway station, in Pakistan
- mdal., abbreviation for mundartlich, the German concept of dialectic categorization in Helvetism
