= JHP =

JHP may refer to:

- Jacketed hollow point, a type of bullet
- J. H. Prynne, a British poet
- Jhimpir railway station, in Pakistan
- Joseph Henry Press, an American publisher
- John Hunt Publishing, former name of English publisher Collective Ink
- Journal of Humanistic Psychology
- Journal of the History of Philosophy, a peer-reviewed academic journal
