= Sultan Karori Halt railway station =

Railway station in Pakistan

Sultan Karori Halt Station سلطان کروڑی ہالٹ ریلوے اسٹیشن

General information
- Coordinates: 31.5341°N 71.0543°E
- Owner: Ministry of Railways
- Line: Kotri–Attock Railway Line

Other information
- Station code: SLNK

Services
Preceding station	Pakistan Railways	Following station
Notak towards Kotri Junction	Kotri–Attock Line	Bhakkar towards Attock City Junction
Location

Sultan Karori Halt Railway Station (Urdu: سلطان کروڑی ہالٹ ریلوے اسٹیشن, Punjabi: سلطان کروڑی ہالٹ ریلوے اسٹیشن) is located in Pakistan.

== See also ==
- List of railway stations in Pakistan
- Pakistan Railways
