= Budhapur railway station =

Railway station in Pakistan

Budhapur Station بڈھا پور ریلوےاسٹیشن ٻڍاپور ريلوي اسٽيشن

General information
- Coordinates: 25°40′32″N 68°19′43″E
- Owner: Ministry of Railways
- Line: Kotri–Rohri via Dadu Railway Line

Other information
- Station code: BDP

Services
Preceding station	Pakistan Railways	Following station
Unarpur towards Kotri Junction	Kotri–Attock Line	Manjhand towards Attock City Junction
Location

Budhapur railway station (Urdu: بڈھا پور ریلوے اسٹیشن, Sindhi: ٻڍاپور ریلوي اسٽیشن) is located in Sindh, Pakistan.

== See also ==
- List of railway stations in Pakistan
- Pakistan Railways
