= Balishah railway station =

Railway station in Pakistan

Balishah Station بالی شاہ اسٹیشن بالي شاھ ريلوي اسٽيشن

General information
- Coordinates: 27.1094°N 67.9083°E
- Owner: Ministry of Railways
- Line: Kotri–Attock Railway Line

Other information
- Station code: BSF

Services
Preceding station	Pakistan Railways	Following station
Rehmani Nagar towards Kotri Junction	Kotri–Attock Line	Shah Panjo Halt towards Attock City Junction
Location

Balishah railway station (Urdu: بالی شاہ ریلوے اسٹیشن,Sindhi: بالي شاھ ریلوي اسٽیشن ) is located in Pakistan.

== See also ==
- List of railway stations in Pakistan
- Pakistan Railways
