= Kallur Kot railway station =

Railway station in Pakistan

Kallur Kot Railway Station کلور کوٹ ریلوے اسٹیشن

General information
- Coordinates: 32.1526°N 71.2647°E
- Owner: Ministry of Railways
- Line: Kotri–Attock Railway Line

Other information
- Station code: KLO

Services
Preceding station	Pakistan Railways	Following station
Maibal towards Kotri Junction	Kotri–Attock Line	Piplan towards Attock City Junction
Location

Kallur Kot Railway Station (Urdu: کلور کوٹ ریلوے اسٹیشن) is a railway station in Kallurkot, Pakistan.

== See also ==
- List of railway stations in Pakistan
- Pakistan Railways
