= Notak railway station =

Railway station in Pakistan

Notak Railway Station نوتک ریلوے اسٹیشن

General information
- Coordinates: 31.4768°N 71.0395°E
- Owner: Ministry of Railways
- Line: Kotri–Attock Railway Line

Other information
- Station code: NTK

Services
Preceding station	Pakistan Railways	Following station
Karor towards Kotri Junction	Kotri–Attock Line	Sultan Karori Halt towards Attock City Junction
Location

Notak Railway Station (Urdu: نوتک ریلوے اسٹیشن, Punjabi: نوتک ریلوے اسٹیشن) is located in Pakistan.

== See also ==
- List of railway stations in Pakistan
- Pakistan Railways
