= Darya Khan railway station =

Railway station in Pakistan

Darya Khan Railway Station دریا خان ریلوے اسٹیشن

General information
- Coordinates: 31.7856°N 71.1086°E
- Owner: Ministry of Railways
- Line: Kotri–Attock Railway Line

Other information
- Station code: DYN

Services
Preceding station	Pakistan Railways	Following station
Kotla Jam towards Kotri Junction	Kotri–Attock Line	Panj Girain towards Attock City Junction
Location

Darya Khan Railway Station (Urdu: دریا خان ریلوے اسٹیشن) is located at Darya Khan, Pakistan.

== See also ==
- List of railway stations in Pakistan
- Pakistan Railways
