= Piaro Goth railway station =

Railway station in Sindh, Pakistan

Coordinates: 26.948069°N 67.815905°E

Piaro Goth Station پیارو گوٹھ اسٹیشن پيارو ڳوٺ ريلوي اسٽيشن

General information
- Owner: Ministry of Railways
- Line: Kotri–Attock Railway Line

Other information
- Station code: PRX

Services
Preceding station	Pakistan Railways	Following station
Dadu towards Kotri Junction	Kotri–Attock Line	Rehmani Nagar towards Attock City Junction
Location

Piaro Goth railway station (Urdu: پیارو گوٹھ ریلوے اسٹیشن, Sindhi: پیارو ڳوٺ ریلوي اسٽیشن) is located in Sindh, Pakistan.

== See also ==
- List of railway stations in Pakistan
- Pakistan Railways
