= Jungshahi railway station =

Railway station in Pakistan

Jungshahi Railway Station جنگ شاہی ریلوے اسٹیشن جنگ شاهي ريلوي اسٽيشن
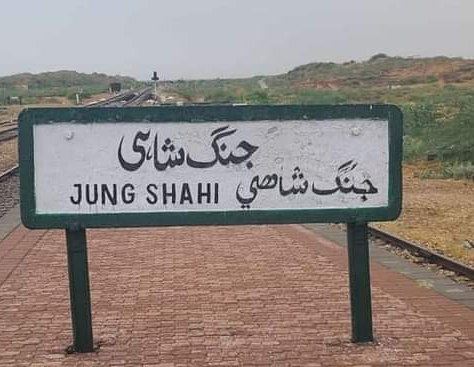

General information
- Coordinates: 24.8555°N 67.7726°E
- Owner: Ministry of Railways
- Line: Karachi–Peshawar Railway Line

Other information
- Station code: JGS

Services
Preceding station	Pakistan Railways	Following station
Ran Pethani towards Kiamari	Karachi–Peshawar Line	Braudabad towards Peshawar Cantonment
Location

Jungshahi Railway Station (Urdu: جنگ شاہی ریلوے اسٹیشن, Sindhi: جنگ شاهي ريلوي اسٽيشن) is a railway station located in Jungshahi, Thatta district of Sindh province, Pakistan.

== Services ==
The following trains stop at Jungshahi station:

Preceding station	Pakistan Railways	Following station
Landhi Junction towards Karachi Cantonment	Awam Express	Jhimpir towards Peshawar Cantonment
Landhi Junction towards Karachi City	Bahauddin Zakaria Express	Kotri Junction towards Multan Cantonment
Landhi Junction towards Karachi City	Bolan Mail	Braudabad towards Quetta

== See also ==
- List of railway stations in Pakistan
- Pakistan Railways
