= Bubak Road railway station =

Railway station in Sindh, Pakistan

Coordinates: 26.484861°N 67.77028°E

Bubak Road Station بوبک روڈ ریلوے اسٹیشن بوبڪ ريلوي اسٽيش

General information
- Owner: Ministry of Railways
- Line: Kotri–Attock Railway Line

Other information
- Station code: BUK

Services
Preceding station	Pakistan Railways	Following station
Sehwan Sharif towards Kotri Junction	Kotri–Attock Line	Bhun towards Attock City Junction
Location

Bubak Road railway station (Urdu: بوبک روڈ ریلوے اسٹیشن, Sindhi: بوبڪ روڊ ریلوي اسٽیشن) is located in Sindh, Pakistan.

== See also ==
- List of railway stations in Pakistan
- Pakistan Railways
