= Jhamat railway station =

Railway station in Pakistan

Coordinates: 33°18′N 71°54′E

Jhamat Railway Station جھمٹ ریلوے اسٹیشن

General information
- Owner: Ministry of Railways
- Line: Kotri–Attock Railway Line

Other information
- Station code: JHMT

Services
Preceding station	Pakistan Railways	Following station
Chhab towards Kotri Junction	Kotri–Attock Line	Uchhri towards Attock City Junction
Location

Jhamat Railway Station (Urdu: جھمٹ ریلوے اسٹیشن) is located in Attock District in Pakistan's Punjab province.

== See also ==
- List of railway stations in Pakistan
- Pakistan Railways
