= Braudabad railway station =

Railway station in Pakistan

Braudabad Railway Station براؤدآباد ریلوے اسٹیشن برائود آباد ريلوي اسٽيشن

General information
- Coordinates: 24.9377°N 67.9033°E
- Owner: Ministry of Railways
- Line: Karachi–Peshawar Railway Line

Other information
- Station code: BKB

History
- Opened: 1861

Services
Preceding station	Pakistan Railways	Following station
Jungshahi towards Kiamari	Karachi–Peshawar Line	Jhimpir towards Peshawar Cantonment
Location

Braudabad Railway Station (Urdu: براؤدآباد ریلوے اسٹیشن, Sindhi: برائود آباد ريلوي اسٽيشن) is located in Braudabad village, Thatta district of Sindh province, Pakistan.

== Services ==
The following trains stop at Braudabad station:

Preceding station	Pakistan Railways	Following station
Jungshahi towards Karachi City	Bolan Mail	Kotri Junction towards Quetta

== See also ==
- List of railway stations in Pakistan
- Pakistan Railways
