= Braudabad =

- Town
- Location within Pakistan
- Coordinates: 24°56′13″N 67°54′6″E
- Country: Pakistan
- Province: Sindh
- District: Thatta

Braudabad is a town of Thatta District in the Sindh province of Pakistan. It lies at 24°56'13"N 67°54'6"E. The town has also a railway station which name is Braudabad railway station.
