= Kambar Ali Khan railway station =

Railway station in Pakistan

Coordinates: 27°36′N 68°00′E

Kambar Ali Khan Station کمبر علی خان اسٹیشن کمبر علي خان اسٽيشن

General information
- Owner: Ministry of Railways
- Line: Larkana–Jacobabad Light Railway

Other information
- Station code: KRAK
Location

Kambar Ali Khan Railway Station (Urdu: کمبر علی خان ریلوے اسٹیشن, Sindhi: کمبر علي خان ریلوي اسٽیشن) is located in Sindh, Pakistan.

== See also ==
- List of railway stations in Pakistan
- Pakistan Railways
