= Shikarpur railway station =

Railway station in Pakistan

Shikarpur Railway Station شکارپور ریلوے اسٹیشن شڪارپور ريلوي اسٽيشن

General information
- Coordinates: 27.9578°N 68.6468°E
- Owner: Ministry of Railways

Other information
- Station code: SHP

History
- Opened: 1901

Services
Preceding station	Pakistan Railways	Following station
Habib Kot Junction towards Rohri Junction	Rohri–Chaman Line	Sultankot towards Chaman
Habib Kot Junction towards Kotri Junction	Kotri–Attock Line	Sultankot towards Attock City Junction
Location
- Location within Pakistan

Shikarpur railway station (Urdu: شکارپور ریلوے اسٹیشن, Sindhi: شڪارپور ریلوي اسٽیشن) is a railway station located in Shikarpur city, Shikarpur district of Sindh province of the Pakistan. It was founded in 1901 in British India.

== See also ==
- List of railway stations in Pakistan
- Pakistan Railways
