= Shahdadkot railway station =

Railway station in Pakistan

Shahdadkot Station شہدادکوٹ اسٹیشن شهداد ڪوٽ ريلوي اسٽيشن

General information
- Owner: Ministry of Railways
- Line: Larkana–Jacobabad Light Railway

Other information
- Station code: SDKT

Shahdadkot Railway Station (Urdu: شہدادکوٹ ریلوے اسٹیشن, Sindhi: شھداد ڪوٽ ریلوي اسٽیشن) is a station on the Larkana–Jacobabad Light Railway line in Pakistan.

== See also ==
- List of railway stations in Pakistan
- Pakistan Railways
