= Bholari railway station =

Railway station in Pakistan

Bholari Railway Station بھولاری ریلوے اسٹیشن ٻولهاڙي ريلوي اسٽيشن

General information
- Coordinates: 25.3221°N 68.2143°E
- Owner: Ministry of Railways
- Line: Karachi–Peshawar Railway Line

Other information
- Station code: BOL

Services
Preceding station	Pakistan Railways	Following station
Meting towards Kiamari	Karachi–Peshawar Line	Kotri Junction towards Peshawar Cantonment
Location

Bholari Railway Station (Urdu: بھولاری ریلوے اسٹیشن, Sindhi: بھولاری ریلوے اسٹیشن, Sindhi: ٻولهاڙي ريلوي اسٽيشن) is located in the town of Bholari, Thatta district in Sindh province of Pakistan.

== See also ==
- List of railway stations in Pakistan
- Pakistan Railways
