= Jhok Mehar Shah =

Jhok Mehar Shah جھوک مہر شاہ
- Village
- Location in Pakistan
- Coordinates: 31°55′00″N 71°06′30″E
- Pakistan: Pakistan
- Province: Punjab
- Elevation: 148 m (486 ft)
- Time zone: UTC+5 (PST)
- 30110: 30100
- Website: https://web.archive.org/web/20121031120141/http://www.bhakkar.com.pk/

Jhok Mehar Shah is a village in Union council Punjgirain Nashaib, Darya Khan Tehsil, Bhakkar District, Punjab, Pakistan.

It was named for Syed Mehar Shah, one of three villages in the district named for three brothers: Jhok Mehar Shah, Jhok Qalander Shah and Jhok Laal Shah.

It is located at 31.9°N 71.1°E, on the east bank of the Indus River and 4 kilometres (2.5 mi) west of Punjgirain. The population of Jhok Mehar Shah was 2,298 at the 2017 census.

There is a Great Mosque Jafria, and a government primary school for boys.

The main ethnic groups of the village are Kumhar, Syed, Noon, Jhunj, Gorai, Babhan, Macchi, Dirkhan, and Muhana.
