= Dadu railway station (Pakistan) =

Railway station in Sindh, Pakistan

Dadu Station دادو اسٹیشن دادو ريلوي اسٽيشن
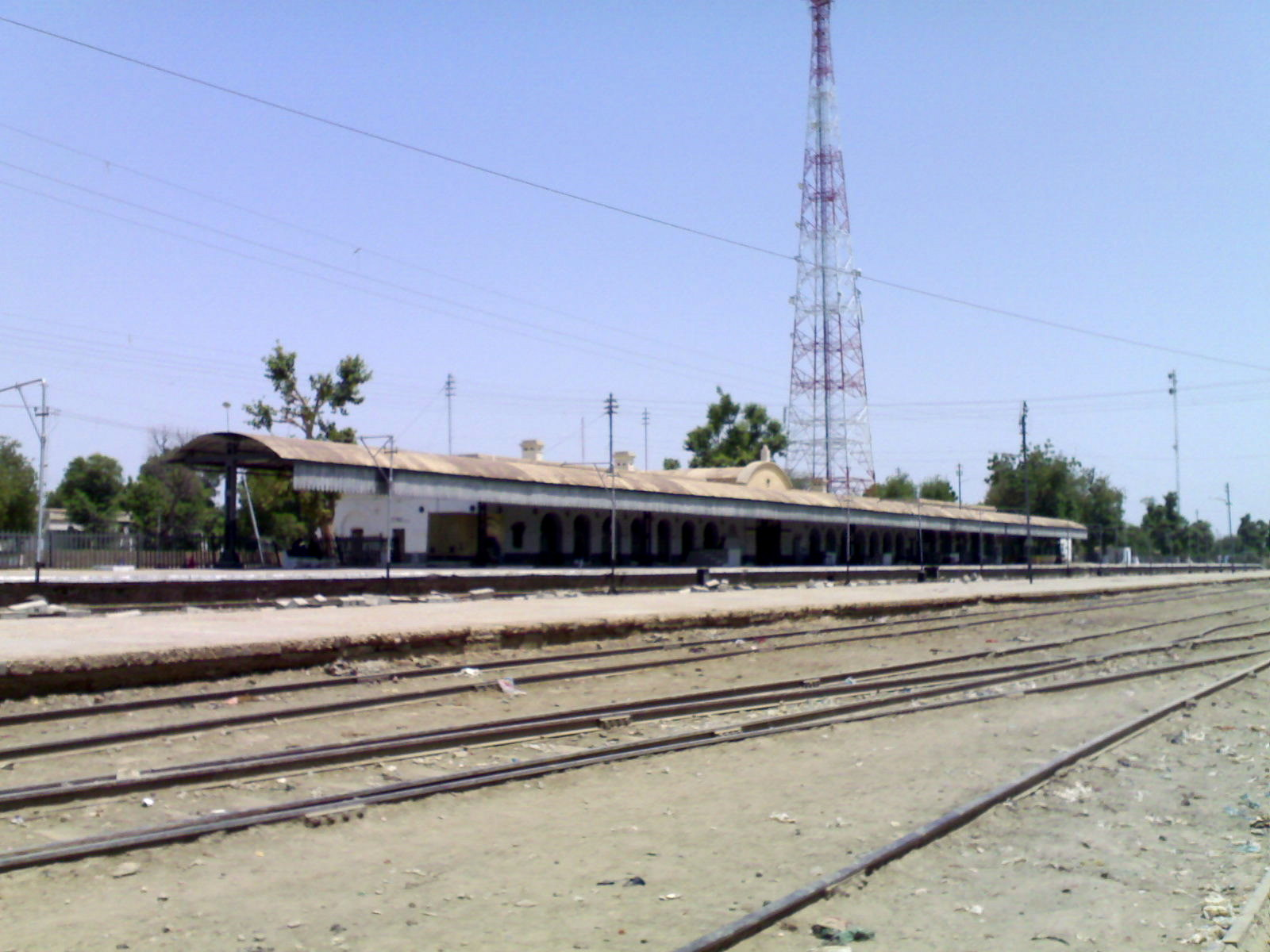

General information
- Location: Station Road; Dadu, Sindh 76200; Pakistan
- Coordinates: 26°43′32″N 67°46′19″E
- Owner: Ministry of Railways
- Line: Kotri–Attock Railway Line

Other information
- Station code: DDU

History
- Opened: 1892

Services
Preceding station	Pakistan Railways	Following station
Khudabad towards Kotri Junction	Kotri–Attock Line	Piaro Goth towards Attock City Junction
Location
- Location within Sindh Location within Pakistan

Dadu railway station (Urdu: دادو ریلوے اسٹیشن, Sindhi: دادو ریلوي اسٽیشن) is located in Dadu, Sindh, Pakistan. The station is a junction station on the Karachi–Peshawar Railway Line and the Kotri–Attock Railway Line.

== See also ==
- List of railway stations in Pakistan
- Pakistan Railways
