= Shah Nawaz Bhutto railway station =

Railway station in Sindh, Pakistan

Shah Nawaz Bhutto Station شاہ نواز بھٹو ریلوے اسٹیشن شاھنواز ڀٽو ريلوي اسٽيشن

General information
- Coordinates: 27.67067°N 68.35486°E
- Owner: Ministry of Railways
- Line: Kotri–Attock Railway Line

Other information
- Station code: SNBT

Services
Preceding station	Pakistan Railways	Following station
Brohi towards Kotri Junction	Kotri–Attock Line	Mahiota towards Attock City Junction
Location

Shah Nawaz Bhutto Railway Station (Urdu: شاہ نواز بھٹو ریلوے اسٹیشن, Sindhi: شاھ نواز ڀٽو ريلوي اسٽيشن) is located in Naudero, Sindh, Pakistan. The station is named on Shah Nawaz Bhutto, formerly it was known as Naudero.

== See also ==
- List of railway stations in Pakistan
- Pakistan Railways
