= Radhan railway station =

Railway station in Sindh, Pakistan

Radhan Station رادھن ریلوے اسٹیشن راڌڻ ريلوي اسٽيشن

General information
- Coordinates: 27.1764°N 67.9541°E
- Owner: Ministry of Railways
- Line: Kotri–Attock Railway Line

Other information
- Station code: RDH

Services
Preceding station	Pakistan Railways	Following station
Shah Panjo Halt towards Kotri Junction	Kotri–Attock Line	Sihar towards Attock City Junction
Location

Radhan railway station (Urdu: رادھن ریلوے اسٹیشن, Sindhi: راڌڻ ريلوي اسٽيشن) is a passenger railway station located in Mehar taluka, Dadu District, in the Sindh province of Pakistan.

== See also ==
- List of railway stations in Pakistan
- Pakistan Railways
