= Injra railway station =

Railway station in Pakistan

Injra Railway Station انجرا ریلوے اسٹیشن

General information
- Coordinates: 33.1274°N 71.8510°E
- Owner: Ministry of Railways
- Line: Kotri–Attock Railway Line

Other information
- Station code: IJA

Services
Preceding station	Pakistan Railways	Following station
Makhad Road towards Kotri Junction	Kotri–Attock Line	Khattakabad towards Attock City Junction
Location

Injra Railway Station (Urdu: انجرا ریلوے اسٹیشن) is located in union council of Makhad. It has a police station. The area is part of Jand Tehsil of District Attock, Punjab, Pakistan.

== See also ==
- List of railway stations in Pakistan
- Pakistan Railways
