= Lakki hills =

Coordinates: 26°06′00″N 67°52′0″E

The Lakki hills, or Laki hills is a range in the Sindh, in Pakistan, to the south of the Manchar Lake. The range is about 50 miles (80 km) long, connected with the Kirthar Mountains and running east towards Sehwan where they terminate on the west bank of the Indus. The highest hills are between 1,500 and 2,000 feet (460 and 610 m). The hills are of recent volcanic origin as shown by frequent hot springs and sulfuric exhalations. It has been totally neglected and only ruins remain today, all because of Islamic conquest.

== History ==
A Chinese Buddhist scholar and traveller Xuanzang alias Hiuen Tsang visited Sindh in the seventh century and described that there were 273 Hindu temples here, out of which 235 belonged to Pashupata Shivaites, which is another order of Shivaism. In his magnum opus, "Sindh Revisited", 19th century British scholar and traveller Sir Richard Francis Burton describes Laki as a place of pilgrimage for Hindus. The devotees called the streams dharan tirtha, which means "constant flow of the earth in a holy place". French researcher Michel Boivin, in his book "Sindh Through History and Representations", notes that Laki "is one of the most important places of the Shivaite cult in Sindh and a stopover for pilgrims going on the journey to Hinglaj Mata temple to celebrate yatra [pilgrimage] in Balochistan".

== Dharan Tirtha Hindu temples ==
Laki was once rich and famous for its historical sites, Hindu temples and shrines of saints like Dharan Pir but after the partition of British India in 1947 and independence of Pakistan, the succeeding governments didn't pay any significant attention to the conservation of the site, and with no local Hindus to maintain the site, the site has been neglected.

== See also ==
- Laki Shah Saddar railway station
