= Bahram Hathiun railway station =

Railway station in Pakistan

Bahram Hathiun Station بحرم ہاتھیوں اسٹیشن

General information
- Owner: Ministry of Railways
- Line: Larkana–Jacobabad Light Railway

Other information
- Station code: BRHN

Bahram Hathiun Railway Station (Urdu: بحرم ہاتھیوں ریلوے اسٹیشن) is located in Pakistan.

== See also ==
- List of railway stations in Pakistan
- Pakistan Railways
