= Punjgirain =

Panjgirain پنجگرائیں
- Town
- Panjgirain
- Location in Pakistan
- Coordinates: 31°55′10″N 71°09′00″E
- Pakistan: Pakistan
- Province: Punjab

Government
  - UC Nazim: Qari Muhammad Ashrif
  - UC Naib Naib Nazim: Ghulam Qasim Karkali
- Elevation: 148 m (486 ft)
- Time zone: UTC+5 (PST)
- 30110: 30100
- Number of Union councils: 1
- Website: http://www.bhakkar.com.pk

Panjgirain is a town of Darya Khan Tehsil, Bhakkar District, Punjab, Pakistan. It is also the headquarters of union council Punjgirain. It is located on Darya Khan-Kalur Kot Road. There is a basic health unit (BHU) and government high schools for boys and girls here. Panj Girain railway station is on Multan Kundian railway track section.

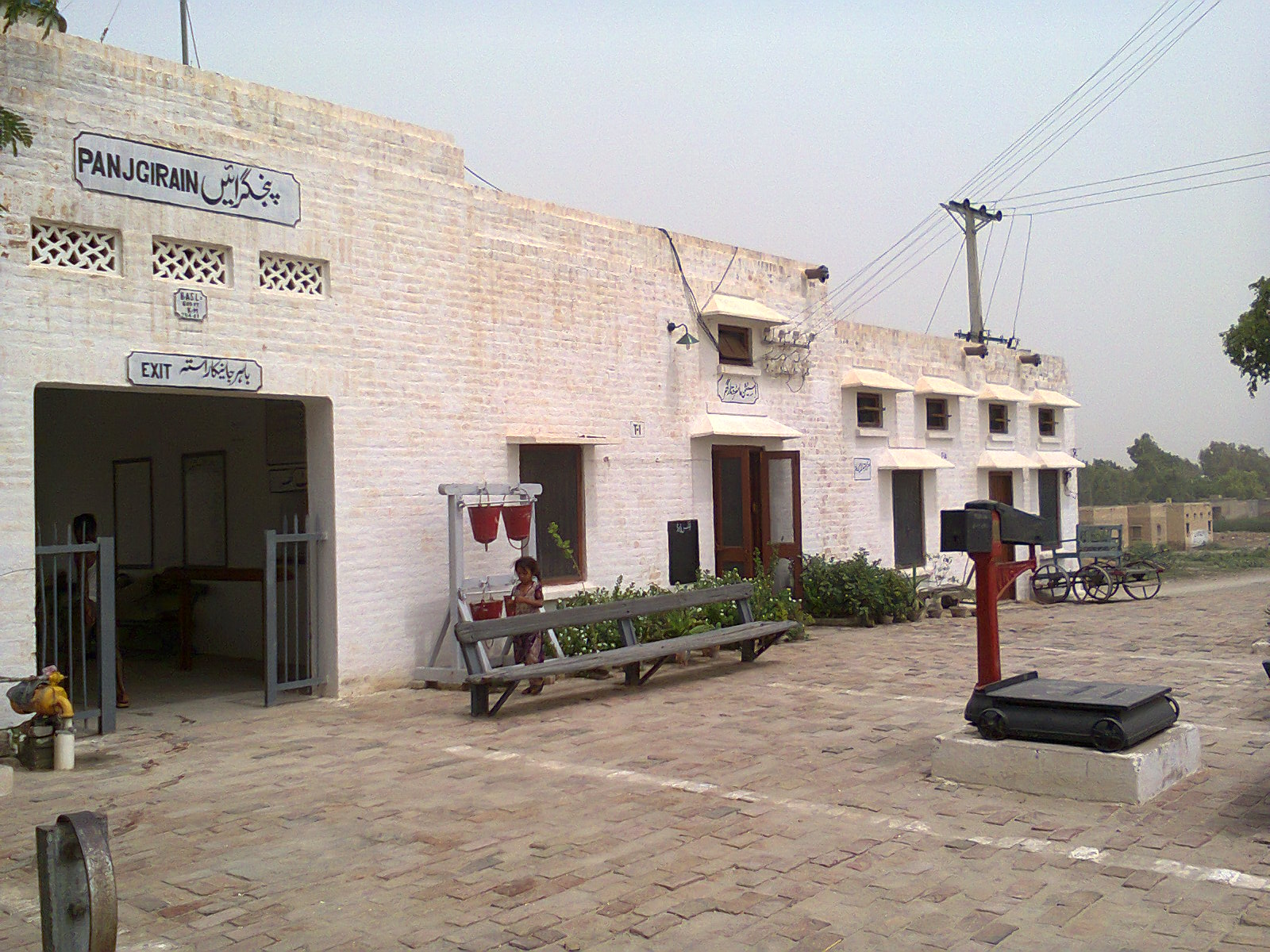
This picture is of Panjgirain Railway Station Building.

Jamia Masjid Sadiqia (Ahale Sunnat) is the largest mosque of the town Jamia Naqvia Arabia is a mosque of the Shia Islamic school in Panjgirain. A police patrol check post is also there. Pir Haji Ahmed Sultan, Haji Shah and Imam's are main graveyards. Wheat, sugarcane, chickpea, Mung bean, and cotton are the corps produced there.

On the east of town the area is desert called Thal and west area is well cultivated near by Indus River called Nashaib. Main villages in the union council are Jhok Mehar Shah, Jhok Qalander Bakhsh, Jhok Laal Shah, Basti Ahmad Shah wali Dager, Dirkhani Khuh and Nashaib.

== Demographics ==
The population of the town, according to 2017 census was 13,588.
