= Ran Pethani railway station =

Railway station in Pakistan

Rand Pethani Railway Station رن پٹھانی ریلوے اسٹیشن رنڈ پٺاڻي ريلوي اسٽيشن

General information
- Coordinates: 24.8261°N 67.6615°E
- Owner: Ministry of Railways
- Line: Karachi–Peshawar Railway Line

Other information
- Station code: RPN

Services
Preceding station	Pakistan Railways	Following station
Dabheji towards Kiamari	Karachi–Peshawar Line	Jungshahi towards Peshawar Cantonment
Location

Ran Pethani Railway Station (Urdu: رن پٹھانی ریلوے اسٹیشن, Sindhi: رن پٺاڻي ریلوي اسٽیشن) is located in Ran Pethani village, in Thatta district of Sindh province of the Pakistan. The station building was constructed in 1962.

== See also ==
- List of railway stations in Pakistan
- Pakistan Railways
