= Dera Ghazi Khan railway station =

Railway station in Dera Ghazi Khan, Pakistan

Dera Ghazi Khan Station ڈیرہ غازی خان اسٹیشن
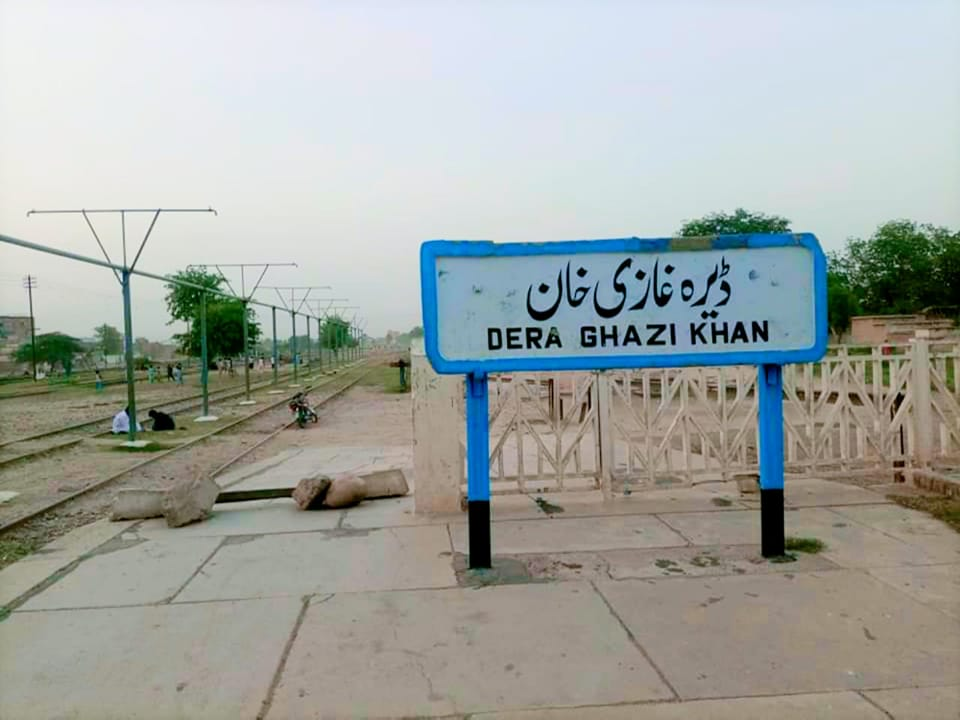

General information
- Coordinates: 30.0507°N 70.6231°E
- Owner: Ministry of Railways
- Line: Kotri–Attock Railway Line

Other information
- Station code: DGK

History
- Opened: 1969

Services
Preceding station	Pakistan Railways	Following station
Paigah towards Kotri Junction	Kotri–Attock Line	Yaroo Khosa towards Attock City Junction
Location

Dera Ghazi Khan Railway Station is located at Dera Ghazi Khan, Pakistan.

== History ==
It was built in 1969.

== Trains ==
- Chiltan Express

== See also ==
- List of railway stations in Pakistan
- Pakistan Railways
