= Chhab railway station =

Railway station in Pakistan

Chhab Railway Station چهب ریلوے اسٹیشن

General information
- Coordinates: 33.2320°N 71.9001°E
- Owner: Ministry of Railways
- Line: Kotri–Attock Railway Line

Other information
- Station code: CBB

Services
Preceding station	Pakistan Railways	Following station
Khattakabad towards Kotri Junction	Kotri–Attock Line	Jhamat towards Attock City Junction
Location
- Location within Pakistan Location within Punjab, Pakistan

Chhab Railway Station (Urdu: چهب ریلوے اسٹیشن) is located in Chhab village. The area is part of Jand Tehsil of Attock District in Pakistan's Punjab province.

== See also ==
- List of railway stations in Pakistan
- Pakistan Railways
