= Makhad Road railway station =

Railway station in Pakistan

Coordinates: 33.037038°N 71.786157°E

Makhad Road Railway Station مکھڈ روڈ ریلوے اسٹیشن

General information
- Owner: Ministry of Railways
- Line: Kotri–Attock Railway Line

Other information
- Station code: MBR

Services
Preceding station	Pakistan Railways	Following station
Sohan Bridge towards Kotri Junction	Kotri–Attock Line	Injra towards Attock City Junction
Location

Makhad Road Railway Station (Urdu: مکھڈ روڈ ریلوے اسٹیشن) is located in Jand Tehsil of Attock District in Pakistan's Punjab province.

== See also ==
- List of railway stations in Pakistan
- Pakistan Railways
