= Basal Junction railway station =

Railway station in Pakistan

Basal Junction Railway Station بسال جنکشن ریلوے اسٹیشن
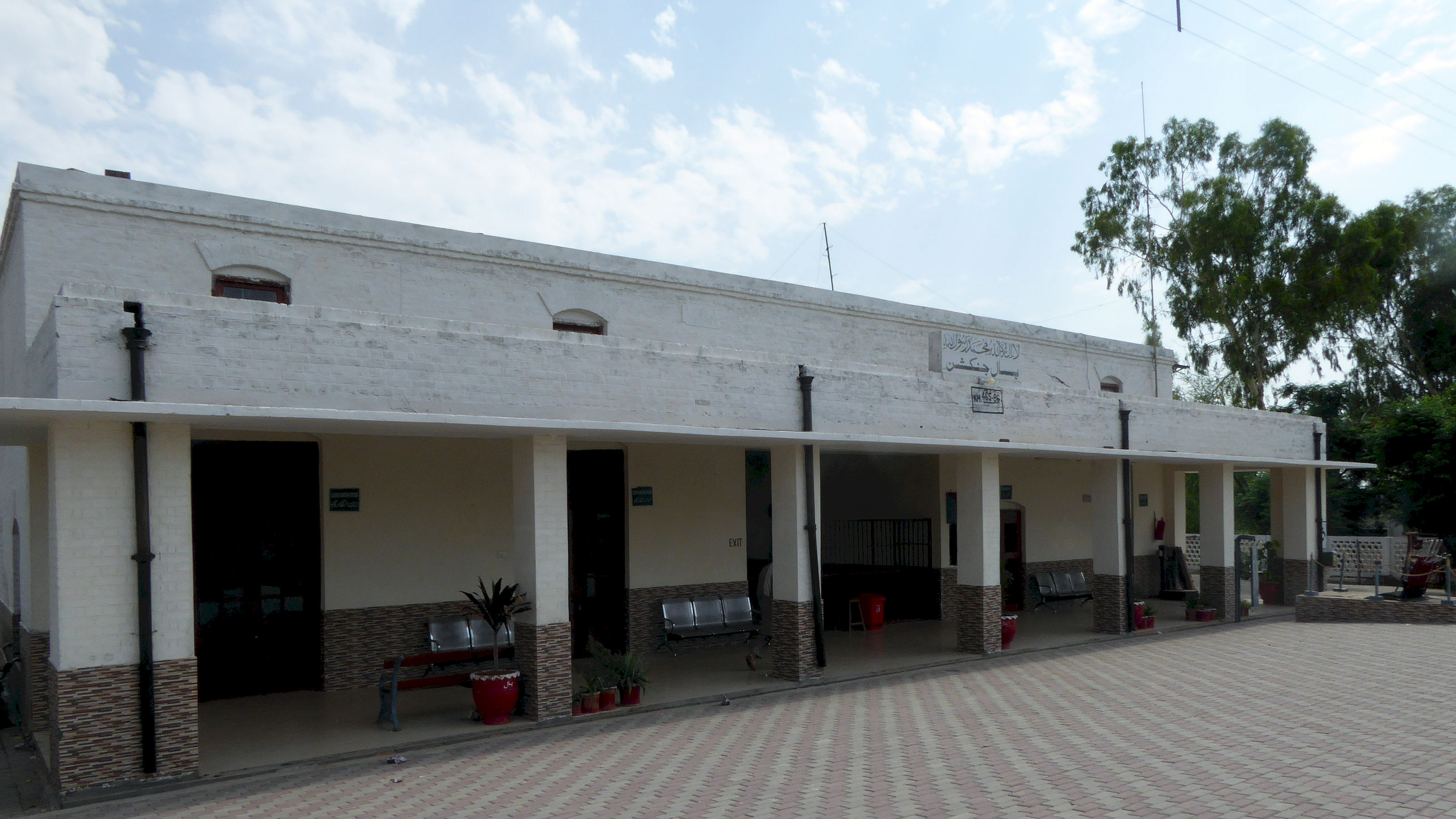
- Station building from platform

General information
- Coordinates: 33.5571°N 72.2322°E
- Owner: Ministry of Railways
- Lines: Kotri–Attock Railway Line; Khushalgarh–Kohat–Thal Railway
- Platforms: 1
- Tracks: 4

Construction
- Platform levels: 1

Other information
- Station code: BOS

History
- Opened: April 1881

Services
Preceding station	Pakistan Railways	Following station
Domel towards Kotri Junction	Kotri–Attock Line	Sulaimanabad towards Attock City Junction
Basal Sharif towards Golra Sharif Junction	Khushalgarh–Kohat–Thal Railway	Domel towards Thal
Location

Basal Junction Railway Station (Urdu: بسال ریلوے اسٹیشن) is located near Basal, a village in Jand Tehsil of Attock District, in Pakistan's Punjab province.

Attock Passenger, Jand Passenger and Kohat Express stop here.

== See also ==
- List of railway stations in Pakistan
- Pakistan Railways

== Gallery ==
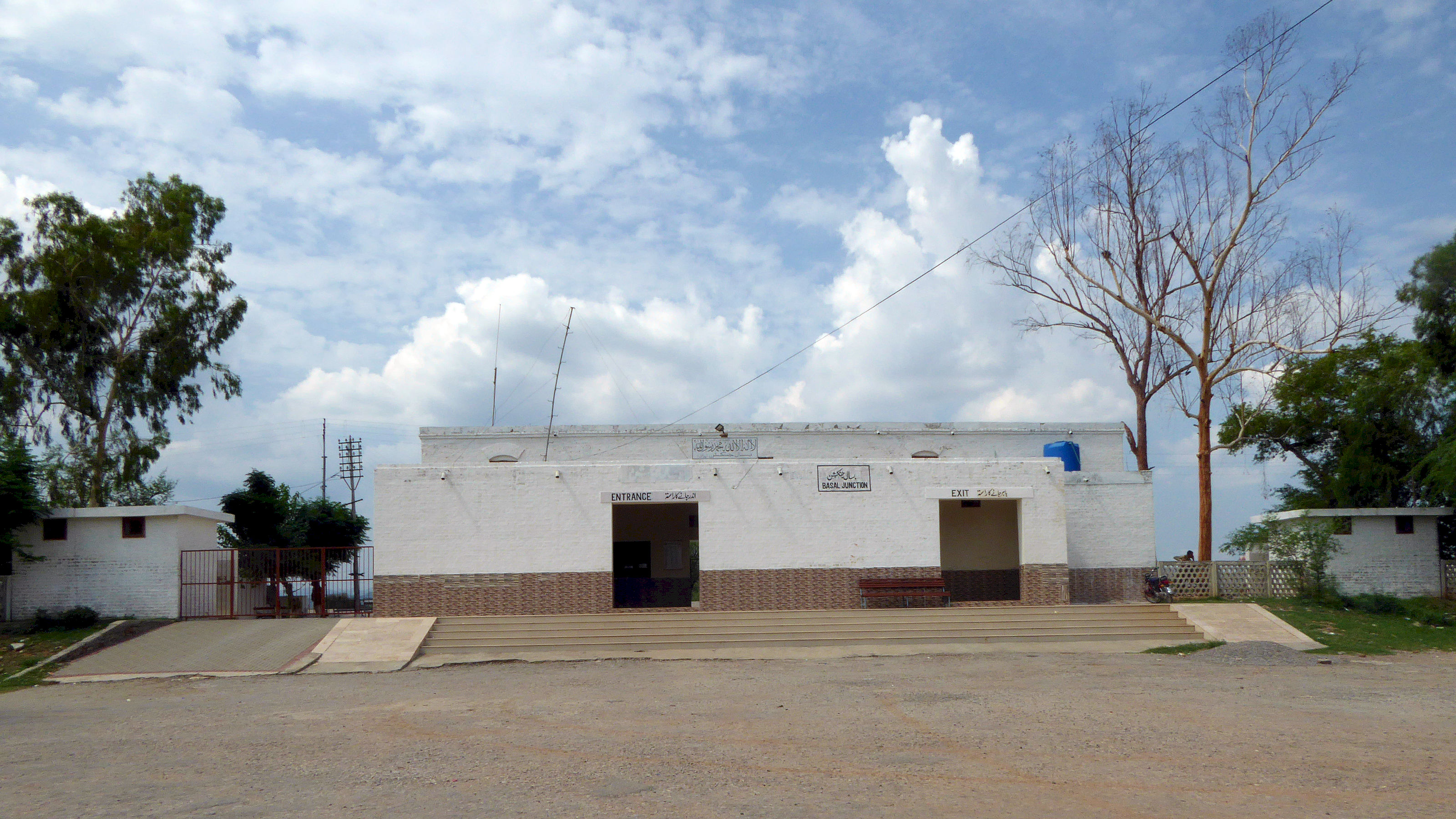
View of the railway station, 2023

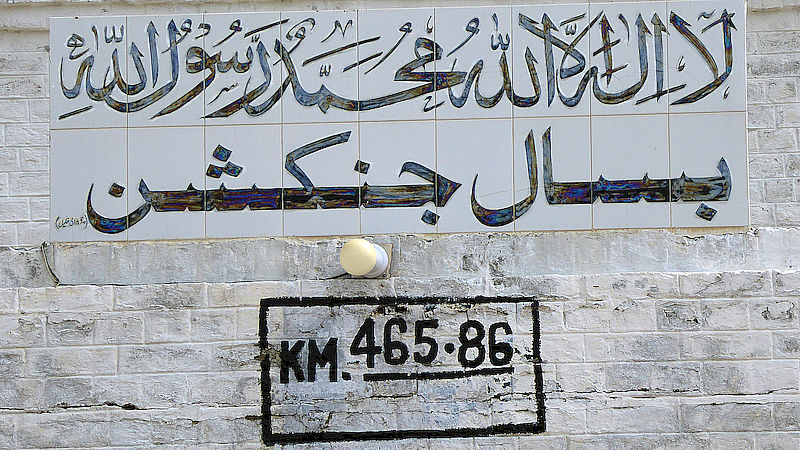
Railway station tag

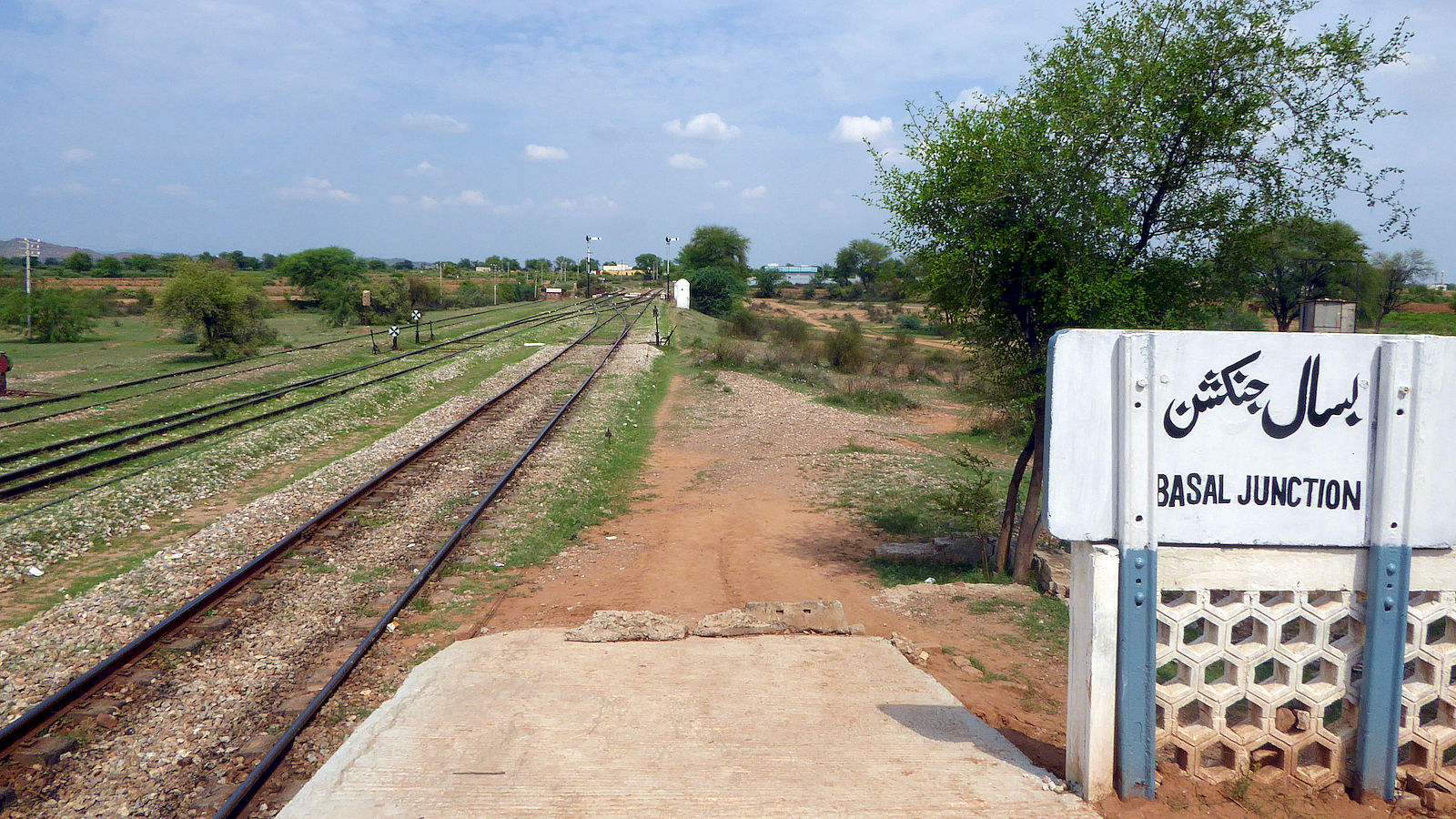
View towards Golra and Attock 2023

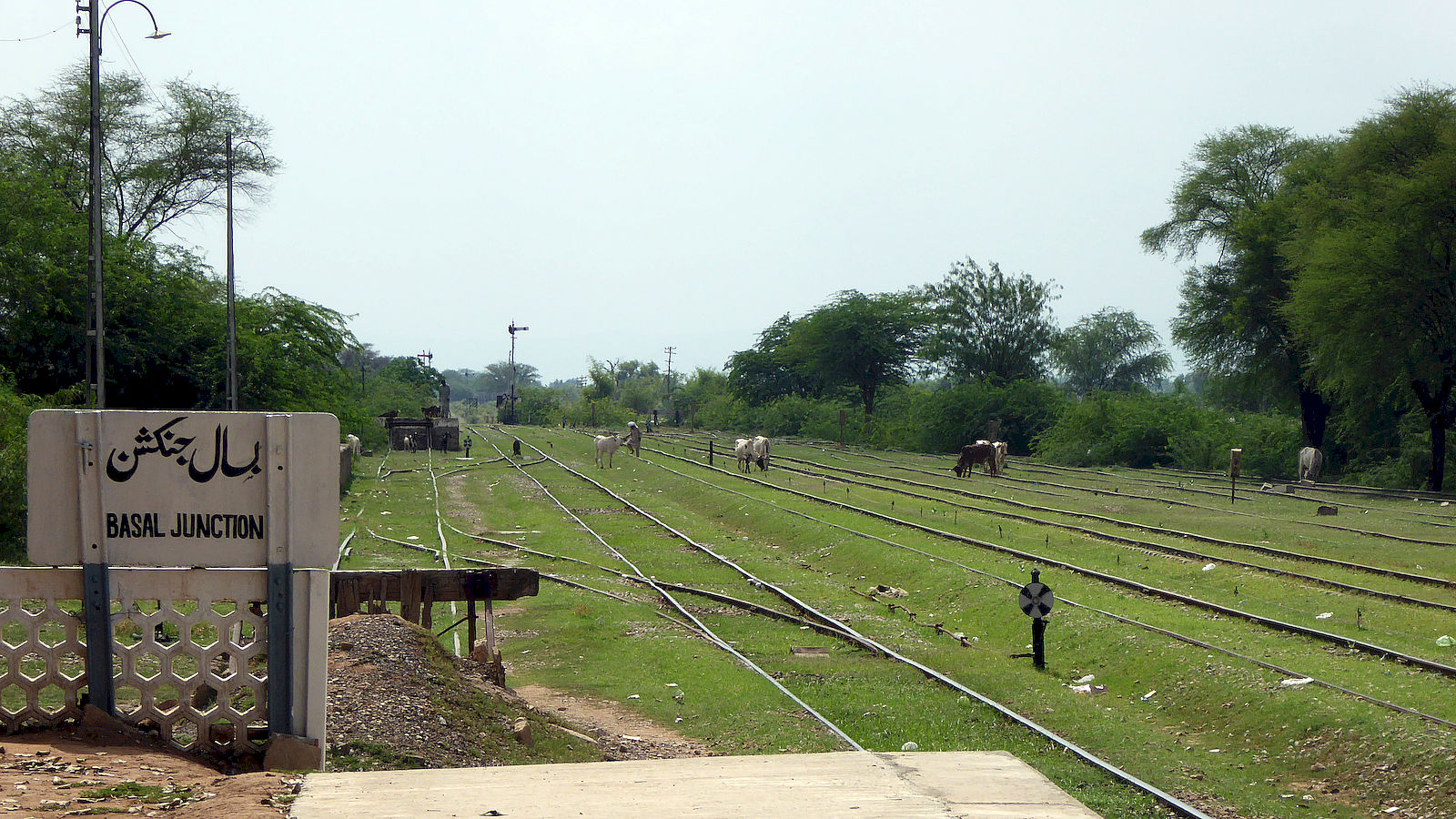
View towards Kohat and Kotri 2023
