= Uchhri railway station =

Railway station in Pakistan

Coordinates: 33.364905°N 71.92728°E

Uchhri Railway Station اچھری ریلوے اسٹیشن

General information
- Owner: Ministry of Railways
- Line: Kotri–Attock Railway Line

Other information
- Station code: UHI

Services
Preceding station	Pakistan Railways	Following station
Jhamat towards Kotri Junction	Kotri–Attock Line	Jand Junction towards Attock City Junction
Location

Uchhri Railway Station (Urdu: اچھری ریلوے اسٹیشن) is located in Punjab, Pakistan.

== See also ==
- List of railway stations in Pakistan
- Pakistan Railways
