= Silra Shahdadkot railway station =

Railway station in Pakistan

Silra Shahdadkot Railway Station سيلرا شهدادڪوٽ ريلوي اسٽيشن

General information
- Coordinates: 27.8424°N 67.9112°E
- Owner: Ministry of Railways

Other information
- Station code: SDKT
Location

Silra Shahdadkot Railway Station (Urdu: سيلرا شہدادکوٹ ریلوے اسٹیشن, Sindhi: سيلرا شھدادڪوٽ ریلوي اسٽیشن) is a railway station located in Shahdadkot, Qambar Shahdadkot District, Pakistan. The railway station is a government-owned railway station.
