= Kotla Nasir railway station =

Railway station in Pakistan

General information
- Owner: Ministry of Railways

Other information
- Station code: KNIR

History
- Former names: Great Indian Peninsula Railway
Location

Kotla Nasir railway station (Urdu: کوٹلہ ناصر ریلوے اسٹیشن) is located in Pakistan.

== See also ==
- List of railway stations in Pakistan
- Pakistan Railways
