= Basti Darwesh Lashari railway station =

Railway station in Pakistan

General information
- Coordinates: 30.250594°N 70.654836°E
- Owner: Ministry of Railways

Other information
- Station code: BSHL

History
- Former names: Great Indian Peninsula Railway
Location
- Location within Punjab, Pakistan Location within Pakistan

Basti Darwesh Lashari railway station (Urdu: بستی درویش لاشاری ریلوے اسٹیشن) is located in Pakistan.

== See also ==
- List of railway stations in Pakistan
- Pakistan Railways – Pakistani state-owned railway company
