= Rojhan railway station =

Railway station in Pakistan

Coordinates: 28.712337°N 69.942992°E

General information
- Owner: Ministry of Railways

Other information
- Station code: RON

History
- Former names: Great Indian Peninsula Railway
Location

Rojhan railway station (Urdu: روجھان ریلوے اسٹیشن) is located in Pakistan.

== See also ==
- List of railway stations in Pakistan
- Pakistan Railways
