= Mauladad railway station =

Railway station in Pakistan

Coordinates: 28.206083°N 68.363296°E

General information
- Owner: Ministry of Railways
- Line: Larkana Jn. to Jacobabad Jn.

History
- Former names: Great Indian Peninsula Railway
Location

Mauladad railway station (Urdu: مولا داد ریلوے اسٹیشن) is located near Jacobabad, Sindh, Pakistan. Mauladad Railway Station Railroad Station is located at the latitude and longitude coordinates of 28.205556 and 68.3625.

== Places near station ==
- Maulādād (1.7 km)
- Tharari Bhaleno (2.4 km)
- Bhalenoābād (3.4 km)
- Gauhar Khān Ramdāni (4.2 km)
- Detha (4.3 km)
- Jakrāni (4.9 km)
- Ghulām Haidar Sandhān (5.2 km)
- Dādpur Jāgir (5.7 km)
- Ramzānpur (5.8 km)
- Nawāz (5.9 km)
- Ghulām Nabi Sādullah (6.1 km)
- Tharari Bhaleno (6.3 km)
- Baluch (6.8 km)
- Sharbatpur (7.3 km)
- Paki Masjid (8.1 km)
- Natkāni (8.2 km)
- Limān (8.3 km)
- Goth Ālam Khān (8.5 km)
- Chākar (8.9 km)
- Bāghi Khān Jakrāni (9 km)
- Sādiq (9 km)
- Goth Hāji Khān Domki (9.5 km)
- Moghairi (9.6 km)
- Atāi (9.7 km)
- Goth Gul Muhammad (9.9 km)
- Ghulām Muhammad (10.2 km)
- Somānpur (10.3 km)
- Goth Hāsil Khān Domki (10.4 km)
- Sobdār Khān Khosa (10.6 km)
- Goth Ghulam Muhammad (10.6 km)
- Goth Wasta (10.6 km)
- Goth Ismāīl Sarband (10.8 km)
- Goth Rais Yār Muhammad Jhakrani (10.8 km)
- Khair Wāh (11 km)

== See also ==
- List of railway stations in Pakistan
- Pakistan Railways
