= Sumbal Hamid railway station =

Railway station in Pakistan

Coordinates: 32.517852°N 71.512359°E

General information
- Owner: Ministry of Railways

Other information
- Station code: SLHD

History
- Former names: Great Indian Peninsula Railway
Location

Sumbal Hamid railway station (Urdu: سنبل حمید ریلوے اسٹیشن) is located in Pakistan.

== See also ==
- List of railway stations in Pakistan
- Pakistan Railways
