= Dher Ummed Ali railway station =

Railway station in Pakistan

Dher Ummed Ali Railway Station

General information
- Owner: Ministry of Railways

Other information
- Station code: DHUA

History
- Former names: Great Indian Peninsula Railway
Location

Dher Ummed Ali Railway Station (Urdu: ڈھیر امید علی شاہ ریلوے اسٹیشن) is located in Dher Ummed Ali Shah, Mianwali District, Pakistan.

== See also ==
- List of railway stations in Pakistan
- Pakistan Railways
