= Sehwan Sharif railway station =

Railway station in Sindh, Pakistan

Sehwan Sharif Station سیہون شریف اسٹیشن سيوهڻ ريلوي اسٽيشن

General information
- Coordinates: 26.4121°N 67.8605°E
- Owner: Ministry of Railways
- Line: Kotri–Attock Railway Line

Other information
- Station code: SWN

Services
Preceding station	Pakistan Railways	Following station
Channa Halt towards Kotri Junction	Kotri–Attock Line	Bubak Road towards Attock City Junction
Location

Sehwan Sharif railway station (Urdu: سیہون شریف ریلوے اسٹیشن, Sindhi: سيوھڻ شریف ریلوي اسٽیشن) located in Sindh, Pakistan one of the important and busy railway stations of Pakistan. It is located in Sehwan Sharif, Pakistan. 10 trains operate through Sehwan Sharif station. The famous trains that start, end, or pass through Sehwan Sharif station include 1st Sehwan Spl, 2nd Sehwan Spl, 2nd Sehwan Spl, 3rd Sehwan Spl, 3rd Sehwan Spl, Bolan Mail and Mohinjo Daro Passenger.

== See also ==
- List of railway stations in Pakistan
- Pakistan Railways
