= Haidar Jatoi railway station =

Railway station in Pakistan

General information
- Coordinates: 27.4364°N 68.1199°E
- Owner: Ministry of Railways

Other information
- Station code: HJTI

History
- Former names: Great Indian Peninsula Railway
Location

Haidar Jatoi railway station (Urdu: حیدر جتوئی ریلوے اسٹیشن) is located in Pakistan.

== See also ==
- List of railway stations in Pakistan
- Pakistan Railways
