= Langar Halt railway station =

Railway station in Pakistan

Coordinates: 33.457012°N 72.051341°E

Langar Halt Railway Station لنگر ریلوے اسٹیشن

General information
- Owner: Ministry of Railways
- Line: Kotri–Attock Railway Line

Other information
- Station code: LGR

Services
Preceding station	Pakistan Railways	Following station
Jand Junction towards Kotri Junction	Kotri–Attock Line	Chur Sharif Halt towards Attock City Junction
Chur Sharif Halt towards Golra Sharif Junction	Khushalgarh–Kohat–Thal Railway	Jand Junction towards Thal
Location

Langar Halt Railway Station (Urdu and Punjabi: لنگر ریلوے اسٹیشن) is railway station located in Basti Langar Khan, Punjab, Pakistan.

The station still uses Neale's token ball system, a system implemented by the British to avoid collision of trains on a single track. In 2022 this station was made abandoned by Pakistan Railways, but train stops so it is a halt station.

== See also ==
- List of railway stations in Pakistan
- Pakistan Railways
