= Meting =

- Town
- Location within Pakistan
- Coordinates: 25.73°N 67.94°E
- Country: Pakistan
- Province: Sindh

Meting (Urdu: میٹنگ) is a small town in Sindh province of Pakistan. It lies at 25.73 Latitude and 67.94 Longitude. Meting railway station is located here.
