= Paharpur Thal railway station =

Railway station in Pakistan

Paharpur Thal railway station پہاڑ پور تھل ریلوے اسٹیشن

General information
- Owner: Ministry of Railways

Other information
- Station code: PHTL

History
- Former names: Great Indian Peninsula Railway
Location

Paharpur Thal railway station (Urdu: پہاڑپور تھل ریلوے اسٹیشن) is located in Layyah District of Punjab, Pakistan.

== See also ==
- List of railway stations in Pakistan
- Pakistan Railways
