= Chura Sharif Halt railway station =

Railway station in Punjab, Pakistan

Chur Sharif Halt Station چور شریف ہالٹ اسٹیشن

General information
- Coordinates: 33.4741°N 72.0907°E
- Owner: Ministry of Railways
- Lines: Kotri–Attock Railway Line; Khushalgarh–Kohat–Thal Railway

Other information
- Station code: CHSF

Services
Preceding station	Pakistan Railways	Following station
Langar towards Kotri Junction	Kotri–Attock Line	Nammal towards Attock City Junction
Nammal towards Golra Sharif Junction	Khushalgarh–Kohat–Thal Railway	Langar towards Thal
Location

Chur Sharif Halt Railway Station (Urdu: چور شریف ہالٹ ریلوے اسٹیشن) is located in Pakistan.

== See also ==
- List of railway stations in Pakistan
- Pakistan Railways
