= Shahwali railway station =

Railway station in Punjab, Pakistan

Coordinates: 28°30′N 69°41′E

General information
- Owner: Ministry of Railways

Other information
- Station code: SHWA

History
- Former names: Great Indian Peninsula Railway
Location

Shahwali railway station (Urdu: شاہ والی ریلوے اسٹیشن) is located in Punjab, Pakistan.

== See also ==
- List of railway stations in Pakistan
- Pakistan Railways
