= Tonsa Barrage Colony railway station =

Railway station in Pakistan

General information
- Owner: Ministry of Railways

Other information
- Station code: TBC

History
- Former names: Great Indian Peninsula Railway

Tonsa Barrage Colony railway station (Urdu: تونسہ بیراج کالونی ریلوے اسٹیشن) is located in Pakistan. It is located within the Tonsa Barrage Colony region.

== See also ==
- List of railway stations in Pakistan
- Pakistan Railways
