= Makhdum Sahib Halt railway station =

Railway station in Pakistan

General information
- Owner: Ministry of Railways

Other information
- Station code: MKMS

History
- Former names: Great Indian Peninsula Railway
Location

Makhdum Sahib Halt railway station (Urdu: مخدوم صاحب ہالٹ ریلوے اسٹیشن) is located in Sindh,Pakistan. The station building is now abandoned

== See also ==
- List of railway stations in Pakistan
- Pakistan Railways
