= Nammal railway station =

Railway station in Pakistan

Nammal نمل

General information
- Coordinates: 33.5061°N 72.1182°E
- Owner: Ministry of Railways
- Lines: Kotri–Attock Railway Line; Khushalgarh–Kohat–Thal Railway

Other information
- Station code: NLM

Services
Preceding station	Pakistan Railways	Following station
Chur Sharif Halt towards Kotri Junction	Kotri–Attock Line	Domel towards Attock City Junction
Domel towards Golra Sharif Junction	Khushalgarh–Kohat–Thal Railway	Chur Sharif Halt towards Thal
Location

Nammal railway station (Urdu: نمل ریلوے اسٹیشن) is located in Pakistan.

== See also ==
- List of railway stations in Pakistan
- Pakistan Railways
