= Meting railway station =

Railway station in Pakistan

Meting Railway Station میٹنگ ریلوے اسٹیشن ميٽنگ ريلوي اسٽيشن

General information
- Coordinates: 25.1606°N 68.1219°E
- Owner: Ministry of Railways
- Line: Karachi–Peshawar Railway Line

Other information
- Station code: MTG

Services
Preceding station	Pakistan Railways	Following station
Jhimpir towards Kiamari	Karachi–Peshawar Line	Bholari towards Peshawar Cantonment
Location

Meting Railway Station (Urdu: میٹنگ ریلوے اسٹیشن, Sindhi: ميٽنگ ريلوي اسٽيشن) is located in Meting village, Thatta district in Pakistan's Sindh province.

== See also ==
- List of railway stations in Pakistan
- Pakistan Railways
