= Behal railway station =

Railway station in Pakistan

General information
- Coordinates: 31.4125°N 71.0225°E
- Owner: Ministry of Railways

Other information
- Station code: BEL

History
- Former names: Great Indian Peninsula Railway
Location

Behal railway station (Urdu: بہل ریلوے اسٹیشن) is located in Pakistan.

== See also ==
- List of railway stations in Pakistan
- Pakistan Railways
