= Adam Khan railway station =

Railway station in Pakistan

General information
- Coordinates: 28.2581°N 68.4529°E
- Owner: Ministry of Railways

Other information
- Station code: ADKM

History
- Former names: Great Indian Peninsula Railway
Location

Adam Khan railway station (Urdu: آدم خان ریلوے اسٹیشن) is located in Pakistan.

== See also ==
- List of railway stations in Pakistan
- Pakistan Railways
