= Wali Mazari railway station =

Railway station in Pakistan

Coordinates: 28.646498°N 69.82374°E

General information
- Owner: Ministry of Railways

Other information
- Station code: WMA

History
- Former names: Great Indian Peninsula Railway
Location

Wali Mazari railway station (Urdu: والی مزاری ریلوے اسٹیشن) is located in Pakistan.

== See also ==
- List of railway stations in Pakistan
- Pakistan Railways
