= Yar Muhammad Kalhoro Halt railway station =

Railway station in Pakistan

General information
- Owner: Ministry of Railways

Other information
- Station code: YMK

History
- Former names: Great Indian Peninsula Railway
Location

Yar Muhammad Kalhoro Halt railway station (Urdu: یار محمد کلہوڑو ہالٹ ریلوے اسٹیشن) is located in Sindh,Pakistan. The station is now abandoned.

== See also ==
- List of railway stations in Pakistan
- Pakistan Railways
