= Chang railway station =

Railway station in Pakistan

Coordinates: 28°12′N 68°16′E

General information
- Owner: Ministry of Railways

Other information
- Station code: CHNG

History
- Former names: Great Indian Peninsula Railway
Location

Chang railway station (Urdu: چھانگ ریلوے اسٹیشن) is located in Pakistan.

== See also ==
- List of railway stations in Pakistan
- Pakistan Railways
