= Domel railway station =

Railway station in Pakistan

Domel Railway Station دومیل ریلوے اسٹیشن

General information
- Coordinates: 33.5555°N 72.1885°E
- Owner: Ministry of Railways
- Lines: Kotri–Attock Railway Line; Khushalgarh–Kohat–Thal Railway

Other information
- Station code: DOME

History
- Opened: 1884

Services
Preceding station	Pakistan Railways	Following station
Nammal towards Kotri Junction	Kotri–Attock Line	Basal Junction towards Attock City Junction
Basal Junction towards Golra Sharif Junction	Khushalgarh–Kohat–Thal Railway	Nammal towards Thal
Location

Domel Railway Station (Urdu: دومیل ریلوے اسٹیشن) is located in Pakistan.

== See also ==
- List of railway stations in Pakistan
- Pakistan Railways

== Gallery ==
Station building viewed from road

Railway station tag

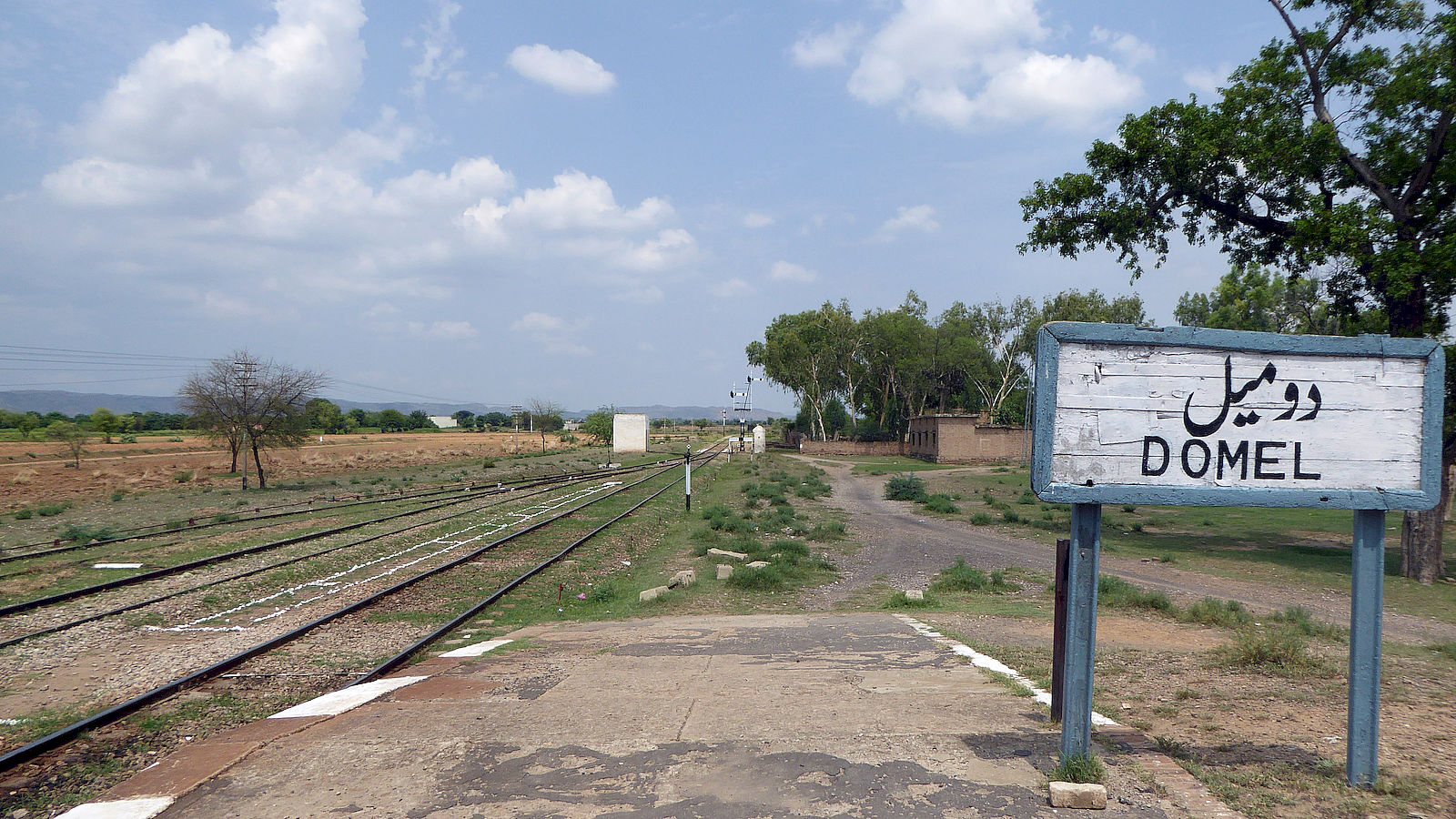
View towards Golra Sharif and Attock

View towards Kohat and Kotri
