= Nusrat railway station =

Railway station in Pakistan

Coordinates: 27°43′N 68°25′E

General information
- Owner: Ministry of Railways

Other information
- Station code: NST

History
- Former names: Great Indian Peninsula Railway
Location

Nusrat railway station or Nasrat railway station (Urdu: نصرت ریلوے اسٹیشن) is located in Pakistan.

== See also ==
- List of railway stations in Pakistan
- Pakistan Railways
