= Chachar railway station =

Railway station in Pakistan

Coordinates: 28.198711°N 68.1525°E

General information
- Owner: Ministry of Railways

Other information
- Station code: CCRB

History
- Former names: Great Indian Peninsula Railway
Location

Chachar railway station (Urdu: چاچھر ریلوے اسٹیشن) is located in Pakistan.

== See also ==
- List of railway stations in Pakistan
- Pakistan Railways
