= Bhumb railway station =

Railway station in Pakistan

Bhumb Railway Station

General information
- Coordinates: 32.3342°N 71.39478°E
- Owner: Ministry of Railways

Other information
- Station code: BHMB

History
- Former names: Great Indian Peninsula Railway
Location
- Location within Punjab, Pakistan Location within Pakistan

Bhumb Railway Station (Urdu: بھومب ریلوے اسٹیشن) is located in Pakistan.

== See also ==
- List of railway stations in Pakistan
- Pakistan Railways
