= Pir Muhammad Metlo Halt railway station =

Railway station in Pakistan

Pir Muhammad Metlo Halt Railway Station پير محمد ميتلو هالٽ ريلوي اسٽيشن

General information
- Owner: Ministry of Railways

Other information
- Station code: PLMO

Pir Muhammad Metlo Halt Railway Station (Urdu: پیر محمد متلو ہالٹ ریلوے اسٹیشن, Sindhi: پير محمد ميتلو ھالٽ ريلوي اسٽيشن) is located in Pakistan.

== See also ==
- List of railway stations in Pakistan
- Pakistan Railways
