= Jhimpir railway station =

Railway station in Jhimpir, Pakistan

Jhimpir Railway Station جھمپیر ریلوے اسٹیشن جهمپير ريلوي اسٽيشن
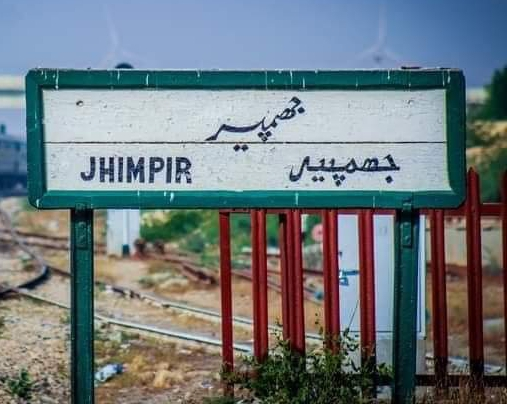

General information
- Location: Jhimpir; Thatta District, Sindh, Pakistan
- Coordinates: 25.0250°N 68.0132°E
- Owner: Ministry of Railways
- Line: Karachi–Peshawar Railway Line

Other information
- Station code: JHP

Services
Preceding station	Pakistan Railways	Following station
Braudabad towards Kiamari	Karachi–Peshawar Line	Meting towards Peshawar Cantonment
Location

Jhimpir Railway Station (Urdu: جھمپیر ریلوے اسٹیشن, Sindhi: جهمپير ريلوي اسٽيشن) is located at Jhimpir village, Thatta district of Sindh province, Pakistan. It is 114 km (71 mi) from Karachi. Jhimpir Wind Power Plant is Pakistan's first wind power plant.

== See also ==
- Keenjhar Lake
- List of railway stations in Pakistan
- Pakistan Railways
