= Habib Kot =

- Village
- Location within Pakistan
- Coordinates: 27.8722°N 68.6610°E
- Country: Pakistan
- Province: Sindh
- District: Shikarpur

Habib Kot (Urdu: حبیب کوٹ), previously Van Radha Ram, is a village in Shikarpur district of Sindh province in Pakistan. It is 10 kilometers (6.2 mi) in South of Shikarpur and 27 kilometers (17 mi) in North of Sukkur. It is located at 27° 51 North and 68° 39 East and has an altitude of 187 feet (57 m).

Habib Kot is famous for its railway station located on Rohri - Quetta railway line. It is the junction of Kotri - Habib Kot via Dadu and Larkana branch railway line.
