= Shah Murtaza Halt railway station =

Railway station in Pakistan

General information
- Coordinates: 27.0798°N 67.8828°E
- Owner: Ministry of Railways

Other information
- Station code: SHMT

History
- Former names: Great Indian Peninsula Railway
Location

Shah Murtaza Halt railway station (Urdu: شاہ مرتضیٰ ہالٹ ریلوے اسٹیشن) is located in Pakistan.

== See also ==
- List of railway stations in Pakistan
- Pakistan Railways
