= Mir Dostali railway station =

Railway station in Pakistan

General information
- Owner: Ministry of Railways

Other information
- Station code: MDAL

History
- Former names: Great Indian Peninsula Railway
Location

Mir Dostali railway station also known as Mir Dost Ali (Urdu: میر دوستالی ریلوے اسٹیشن) is located in Pakistan.

== See also ==
- List of railway stations in Pakistan
- Pakistan Railways
