= Kanjur railway station =

Railway station in Pakistan

Coordinates: 33.719563°N 72.353839°E

Kanjur Railway Station کنجور ریلوے اسٹیشن

General information
- Owner: Ministry of Railways
- Line: Kotri–Attock Railway Line

Other information
- Station code: KUJ

History
- Opened: 1890

Services
Preceding station	Pakistan Railways	Following station
Jhalar towards Kotri Junction	Kotri–Attock Line	Attock City Junction Terminus
Location

Kanjur Railway Station (Urdu: کنجور ریلوے اسٹیشن) is located in District Attock Punjab Pakistan.

== See also ==
- List of railway stations in Pakistan
- Pakistan Railways
