= Bero Chandia railway station =

Railway station in Pakistan

Bero Chandia Railway Station ٻيڙو چانڊيو ريلوي اسٽيشن

General information
- Owner: Ministry of Railways

Other information
- Station code: BRCD

Bero Chandia Railway Station (Urdu: بیروچانڈیہ ریلوے اسٹیشن, Sindhi: ٻيڙو چانڊيو ریلوي اسٽیشن) is located in Pakistan.

== See also ==
- List of railway stations in Pakistan
- Pakistan Railways
