= Sulemanabad railway station =

Railway station in Pakistan

Sulemanabad Railway Station سلیمان آباد ریلوے اسٹیشن
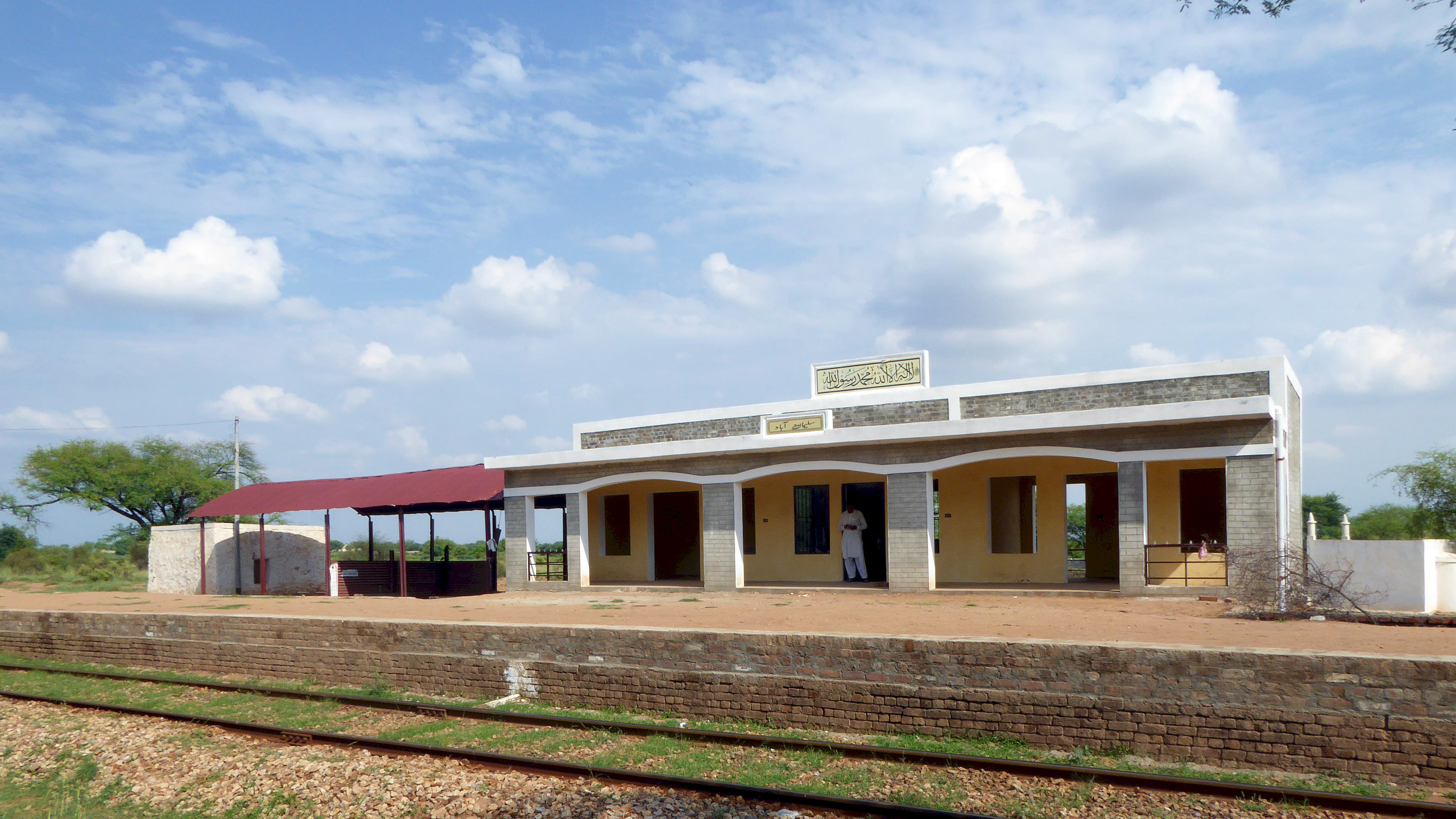
- Sulemanabad railway station

General information
- Coordinates: 33.5902°N 72.3142°E
- Owner: Ministry of Railways
- Line: Kotri–Attock Railway Line

Other information
- Station code: SLMA

Services
Preceding station	Pakistan Railways	Following station
Basal Junction towards Kotri Junction	Kotri–Attock Line	Jhalar towards Attock City Junction
Location

Sulemanabad Railway Station (Urdu and Punjabi: سلیمان آباد ہالٹ ریلوے اسٹیشن) is located in Attock District, Punjab, Pakistan.

== See also ==
- List of railway stations in Pakistan
- Pakistan Railways

== Gallery ==
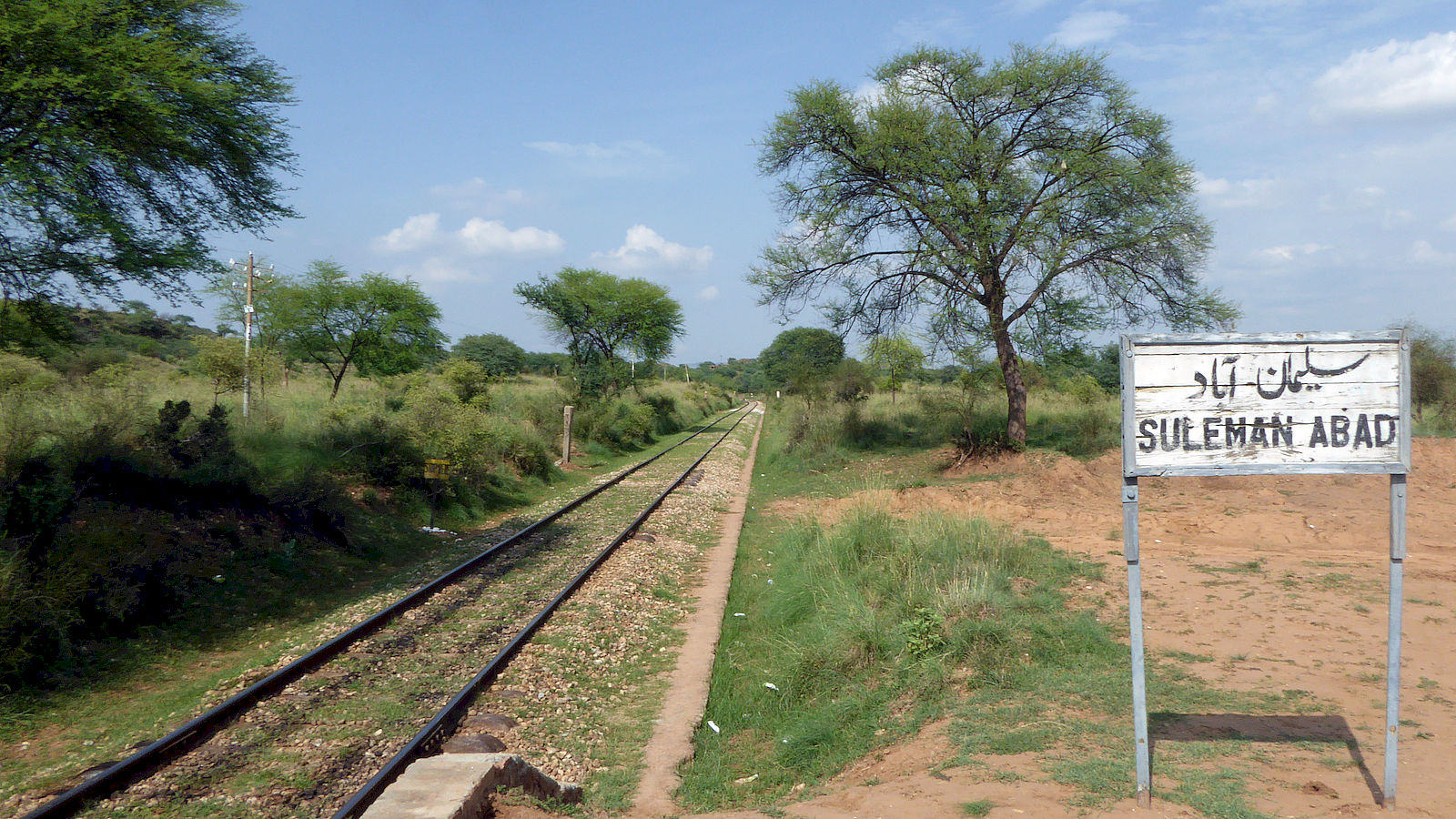
View towards Attock
