= Attock City Junction railway station =

Railway station in Pakistan

Attock City Junction Station اٹک سٹی جنکشن
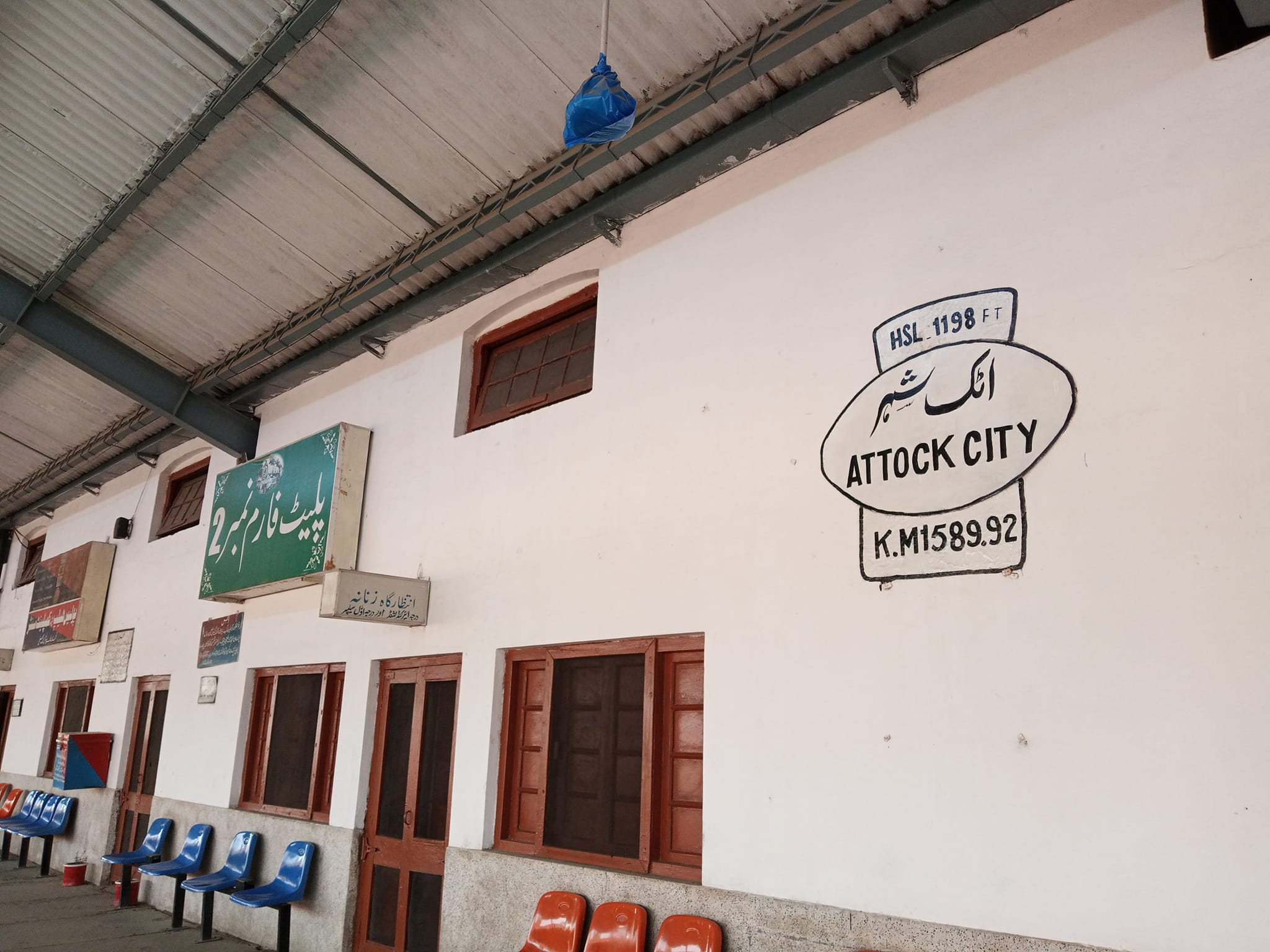

General information
- Location: Station Road, Attock, Punjab 43600
- Coordinates: 33.7746°N 72.3522°E
- Elevation: 1,198 feet (365 m)
- Owner: Ministry of Railways
- Lines: Karachi–Peshawar Railway Line; Kotri–Attock Railway Line
- Platforms: 2

Construction
- Structure type: Standard (on ground station)
- Parking: Available
- Accessible: Available

Other information
- Station code: ATCY

History
- Opened: 1881; 145 years ago

Services
Preceding station	Pakistan Railways	Following station
Sanjwal towards Kiamari	Karachi–Peshawar Line	Rumian towards Peshawar Cantonment
Sulaimanabad towards Kotri Junction	Kotri–Attock Line	Terminus
Location
- Location within Punjab, Pakistan Location within Pakistan

Attock City Junction Railway Station (Urdu and Punjabi: اٹک سٹی جنکشن ریلوے اسٹیشن) is located in Attock city, Attock district, Punjab province, Pakistan.

== Train routes ==
The following trains stop/terminate/originate from Attock City Junction station:

Preceding station	Pakistan Railways	Following station
Hasan Abdal towards Karachi Cantonment	Awam Express	Jehangira Road towards Peshawar Cantonment
Kanjur towards Mari Indus	Attock Passenger	Terminus
Jhalar towards Karachi City	Khushhal Khan Khattak Express	Jehangira Road towards Peshawar Cantonment
Rawalpindi towards Karachi Cantonment	Khyber Mail	Jehangira Road towards Peshawar Cantonment

== Train Stops ==
Attock Passenger, Awam Express, Khyber Mail, Jand Passenger and Rehman Baba Express have stop at Attock city Railway Station.

== See also ==
- List of railway stations in Pakistan
- Pakistan Railways
