= List of places in Muzaffargarh =

This is a list of all the notable places in Muzaffargarh City and its surroundings.

== Administrative Division ==
- Muzaffargarh District
- Alipur Tehsil
- Chowk Sarwar Shaheed
- Jatoi Tehsil
- Kot Addu Tehsil
- Muzaffargarh Tehsil

== Villages and localities ==
- Allama Iqbal Town
- Faqirwala
- Gamoon wala
- Jalalabad
- Jatoi
- Khangarh
- Khar
- Kot Addu
- Meerwala
- Mehmood Kot
- Qasba Gujrat
- Rohilanwali
- Sanawan
- Seet pur

== Monuments ==
- Yadgar Club

== Hospitals ==
- Recep Tayyip Erdoğan Hospital

== Colonial Buildings ==
- Yadgar Club
- Chenab West Bank railway station
- Muzaffargarh railway station
- Kotla Laghari Halt railway station (Closed)
- Budh railway station
- Mahmud Kot railway station
- Gurmani railway station
- Sanawan railway station
- Kot Adu Junction railway station
- Dera Dinpanah railway station
- Ashanpur railway station
- Hamdaniwala Halt railway station

== Railway Stations ==
- Chenab West Bank railway station
- Muzaffargarh railway station
- Kotla Laghari Halt railway station (Closed)
- Budh railway station
- Mahmud Kot railway station
- Gurmani railway station
- Sanawan railway station
- Kot Adu Junction railway station
- Dera Dinpanah railway station
- Ashanpur railway station
- Hamdaniwala Halt railway station
- Lal Mir Halt railway station
- Lal Pir railway station

== Historical Forts ==
- Shah Garh Fort
- Ghazanfargarh Fort

== Mausoleums ==
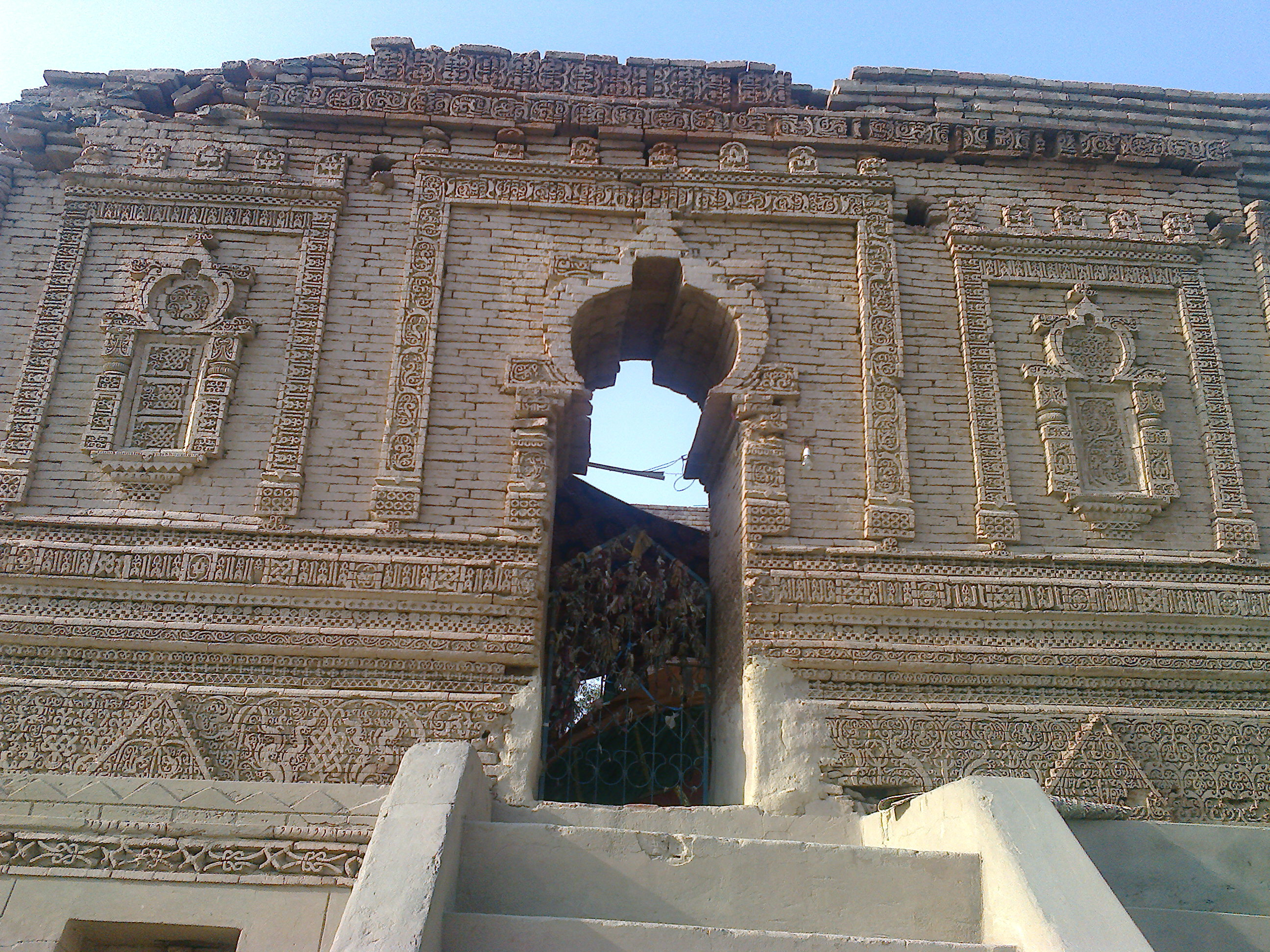
Tomb of Sheikh Sadan

- Gous Pak

== Cultural heritage sites in Muzaffargarh ==
=== Protected sites ===
- Tomb of Tahir Khan Nahar

=== Unprotected Sites ===
- Fort of Mahmood Kot

== Mosques ==
- Jamia Sakeena-Tul-Sughra - Jatoi

== Education Institutions ==
=== Government Colleges ===
There are about two dozen Government colleges in Muzaffargarh District۔

=== Schools ===
- The Educators

== Sports ==
- Faisal Stadium

== Parks and Gardens ==
- Fayyaz Park
- Nawab Muzaffar Khan Park

== See also ==
- List of roads in Muzaffargarh
- List of places in Multan
- List of places in Lahore
- List of places in Faisalabad
