= Mehr Express =

Pakistani passenger train

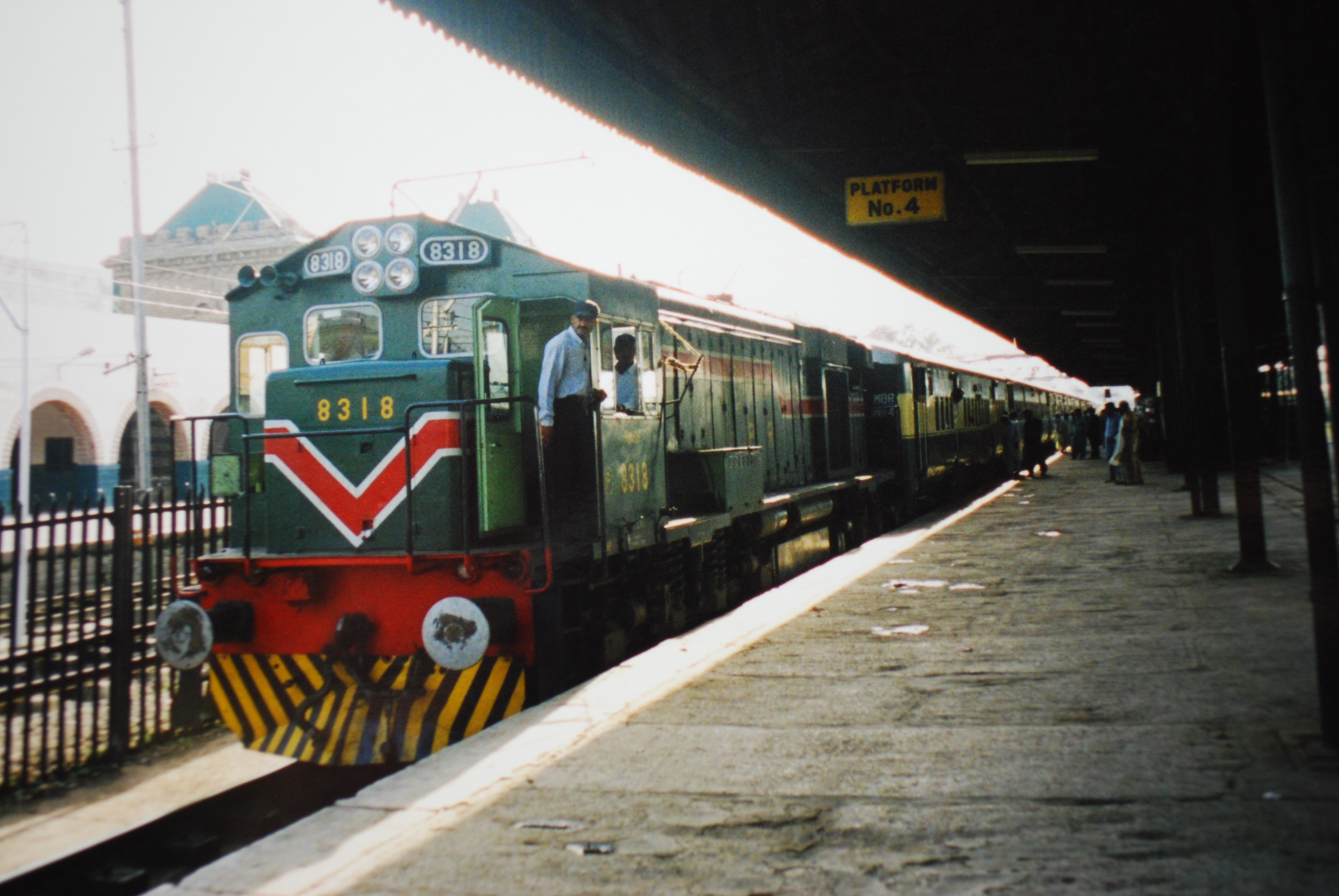
- Mehr Express at Rawalpindi railway station

Overview
- Service type: Inter-city rail
- First service: 2004
- Current operator: S.Jamil & Co

Route
- Termini: Multan Cantonment; Rawalpindi
- Stops: 36
- Distance travelled: 559 kilometres (347 mi)
- Average journey time: 14 hours, 30 minutes
- Service frequency: Daily
- Train numbers: 127UP (Multan→Rawalpindi); 128DN (Rawalpindi→Multan)

On-board services
- Classes: AC standard Class; Economy
- Sleeping arrangements: Available
- Catering facilities: non-Available

Technical
- Track gauge: 1,676 mm (5 ft 6 in)
- Track owner: Pakistan Railways

Mehr Express (Urdu: مہر ایکسپریس) is a passenger train operated daily by Pakistan Railways between Multan and Rawalpindi. The trip takes approximately 14 hours, 30 minutes to cover a published distance of 559 kilometres (347 mi), traveling along a stretch of the Karachi–Peshawar Railway Line, Sher Shah–Kot Addu Branch Line and Kotri–Attock Railway Line.

== Route ==
- Multan Cantonment–Sher Shah Junction via Karachi–Peshawar Railway Line
- Sher Shah Junction–Kot Addu Junction via Sher Shah–Kot Addu Branch Line
- Kot Addu Junction–Basal Junction via Kotri–Attock Railway Line
- Basal Junction–Golra Sharif Junction via Golra Sharif-Basal Branch Line
- Golra Sharif Junction–Rawalpindi via Karachi–Peshawar Railway Line

== Station stops ==
- Multan Cantonment
- Sher Shah Junction
- Muzaffargarh
- Mahmud Kot
- Gurmani
- Sanawan
- Kot Addu Junction
- Dera Dinpanah
- Ashanpur
- Kot Sultan
- Jaman Shah
- Layyah
- Karor Lal Ehsan
- Behal
- Bhakkar
- Darya Khan
- Kallur Kot
- Piplan
- Alluwali
- Kundian Junction
- Mianwali
- Pai Khel
- Daud Khel Junction
- Makhad Road
- Injra
- Chhab
- Jhamat
- Uchhri
- Jand Junction
- Domel
- Basal Junction
- Basal Sharif
- Fatehjang
- Tarnoul
- Golra Sharif Junction
- Rawalpindi

== Equipment ==
The train offers both AC Standard and economy accommodations.

== Booking ==
The tickets for Mehr Express can be booked online via bookme.pk.

== Incidents ==
- Three people were killed when the Rawalpindi bound Mehr Express hit a vehicle at a level crossing in Hatar Phatak near Fateh Jang 15 September 2016.
