= List of railway lines in Pakistan =

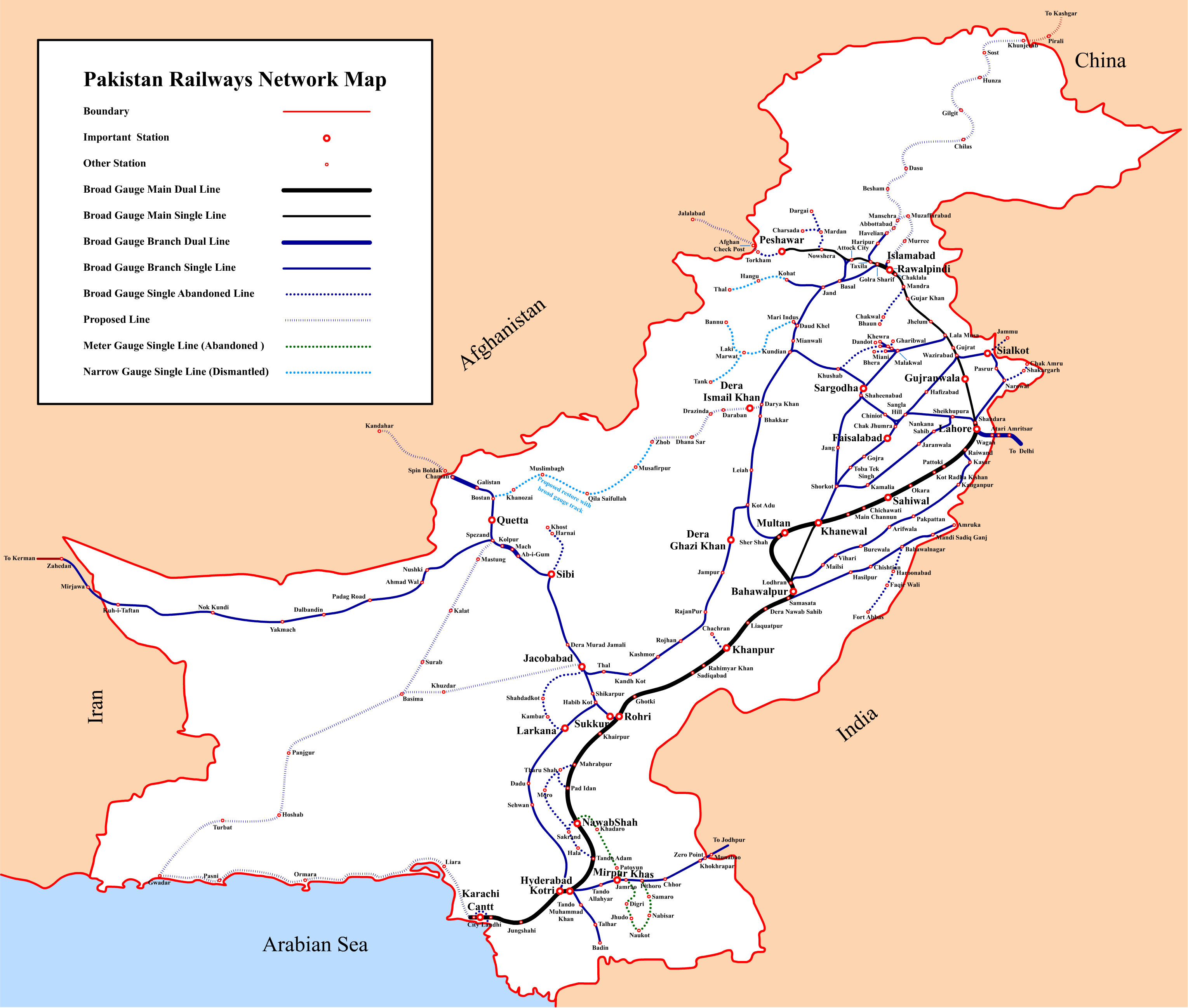
Pakistan railways map

This is a list of Railway lines in Pakistan. The lines and the stations are owned and operated by Pakistan Railways. Rail lines in Pakistan are divided into main lines and branch lines.

== Main lines ==
Description	Established	Length	Stations	Travel time	Gauge
Karachi–Peshawar Line (Main Line 1)	1881	1,687 kilometers (1,048 mi)	173	30-32 hrs	1,676 mm (5 ft 6 in) broad gauge
Major stations: Karachi City; Karachi Cantonment; Kotri Junction; Hyderabad Junction > Hyderabad-Khokhrapar Branch Line, Hyderabad-Badin Branch Line; Nawabshah Junction; Rohri Junction > Rohri–Chaman Line (Main Line 3); Ghotki; Sadiqabad; Rahim Yar Khan; Bahawalpur; Lodhran Junction > Lodhran–Khanewal Branch Line, Lodhran–Raiwind Branch Line; Multan Cantonment; Khanewal Junction > Khanewal–Wazirabad Branch Line; Sahiwal; Okara; Lahore Junction > Lahore–Wagah Branch Line; Shahdara Bagh Junction > Shahdara Bagh–Sanga Hill Branch Line and Shahdara Bagh–Chak Amru Branch Line; Gujranwala Railway Station; Wazirabad Junction > Wazirabad–Narowal Branch Line; Gujrat railway station; Lala Musa Junction > Shorkot–Lalamusa Branch Line; Jhelum; Rawalpindi; Taxila Junction; Hasan Abdal; Attock City; Nowshera Junction; Peshawar City; Peshawar Cantonment > Khyber train safari
Kotri–Attock Line (Main Line 2)	1916	1,246 km (774 mi)	92	27.5 hrs	1,676 mm (5 ft 6 in) broad gauge
Major stations: Kotri Junction; Jamshoro; Sehwan Sharif; Dadu; Larkana Junction; Habib Kot Junction; Jacobabad Junction; Kandkot; Kashmore; Mithan Kot; Rajanpur; Jampur; Dera Ghazi Khan; Layyah; Bhakkar; Kundian Junction; Mianwali; Daud Khel Junction; Jand Junction; Basal Junction; Attock City Junction
Rohri–Chaman Line (Main Line 3)	1906	526 km (327 mi)	38	8-10 hrs	1,676 mm (5 ft 6 in) broad gauge
Major stations: Rohri Junction > Karachi–Peshawar Line (Main Line 1); Sukkur; Shikarpur; Jacobabad Junction; Dera Murad Jamali; Sibi Junction; Mach; Spezand Junction; Quetta > Quetta-Taftan Line; Kuchlak; Bostan; Qilla Abdullah; Chaman; International links Proposed link to Kandahar, Afghanistan
Spezand–Taftan Line (Main Line 4)	1902	632 km (393 mi)		4 hrs 05 mins - 4 hrs 40 mins	Mixed gauge
Major stations: Spezand Junction; Nushki; Ahmedwal; Dalbandin; Nok Kundi; Koh-e-Taftan; Mirjaveh; Zahedan; International links Continues to Zahedan, Iran

== Branch lines ==
- Hyderabad–Khokhrapar Branch Line
- Sher Shah–Kot Addu Branch Line
- Lodhran–Khanewal Chord Line
- Lodhran–Raiwind Branch Line
- Khanewal–Wazirabad Branch Line
- Shorkot–Sheikhupura Branch Line
- Shorkot–Lalamusa Branch Line
- Jand–Thal Branch Line
- Daud Khel–Lakki Marwat Branch Line
- Malakwal–Khushab Branch Line
- Chak Jhumra–Kundian Branch Line
- Shahdara Bagh–Sangla Hill Branch Line
- Shahdara Bagh–Chak Amru Branch Line
- Wazirabad–Narowal Branch Line
- Golra Sharif–Basal Branch Line

== Proposed lines ==
- Karachi–Gwadar Railway Line (Makran Coastal Railway)
- Gwadar–Mastung Branch Line
- Basima–Jacobabad Branch Line
- Nur–Muzaffarabad Branch Line
- Uzbekistan–Afghanistan–Pakistan Railway Project
- Khunjerab Railway (China–Pakistan railway)
- Thar Coal Railway

== Tourist and heritage railways ==
- Changa Manga Forestry Railway
- Dandot Light Railway
- Khewra Salt Mines Railway
- Khyber Pass Railway

== Proposed standard-gauge line to Iran ==
Pakistan Railways is working on plans to construct a 635 km standard-gauge line from Quetta to Taftan on the Pakistan-Iranian border.

The proposed railway would support the transport of high-value goods to Europe and Central Asia. Trains on the Islamabad – Tehran – Istanbul route currently take around five days to complete the journey, possibly due to poor or compromised condition of the track. It is claimed that a standard-gauge line would reduce journey times to 20 hours.

== See also ==
- Cross-border railway lines in Pakistan
- Abandoned and dismantled railway lines in Pakistan
- List of railway stations in Pakistan
