= Khushhal Khan Khattak Express =

Pakistani passenger train

Overview
- Service type: Inter-city rail
- First service: 1962
- Current operator(s): Pakistan Railways

Route
- Termini: Karachi City; Peshawar Cantonment
- Stops: 43
- Distance travelled: 1,512 kilometres (940 mi)
- Average journey time: 34 hours, 15 minutes
- Service frequency: After one day
- Train number(s): 19UP (Karachi→Peshawar); 20DN (Peshawar→Karachi)

On-board services
- Class(es): Economy
- Sleeping arrangements: Available
- Catering facilities: Not available

Technical
- Track gauge: 1,676 mm (5 ft 6 in)
- Track owner(s): Pakistan Railways
Route map
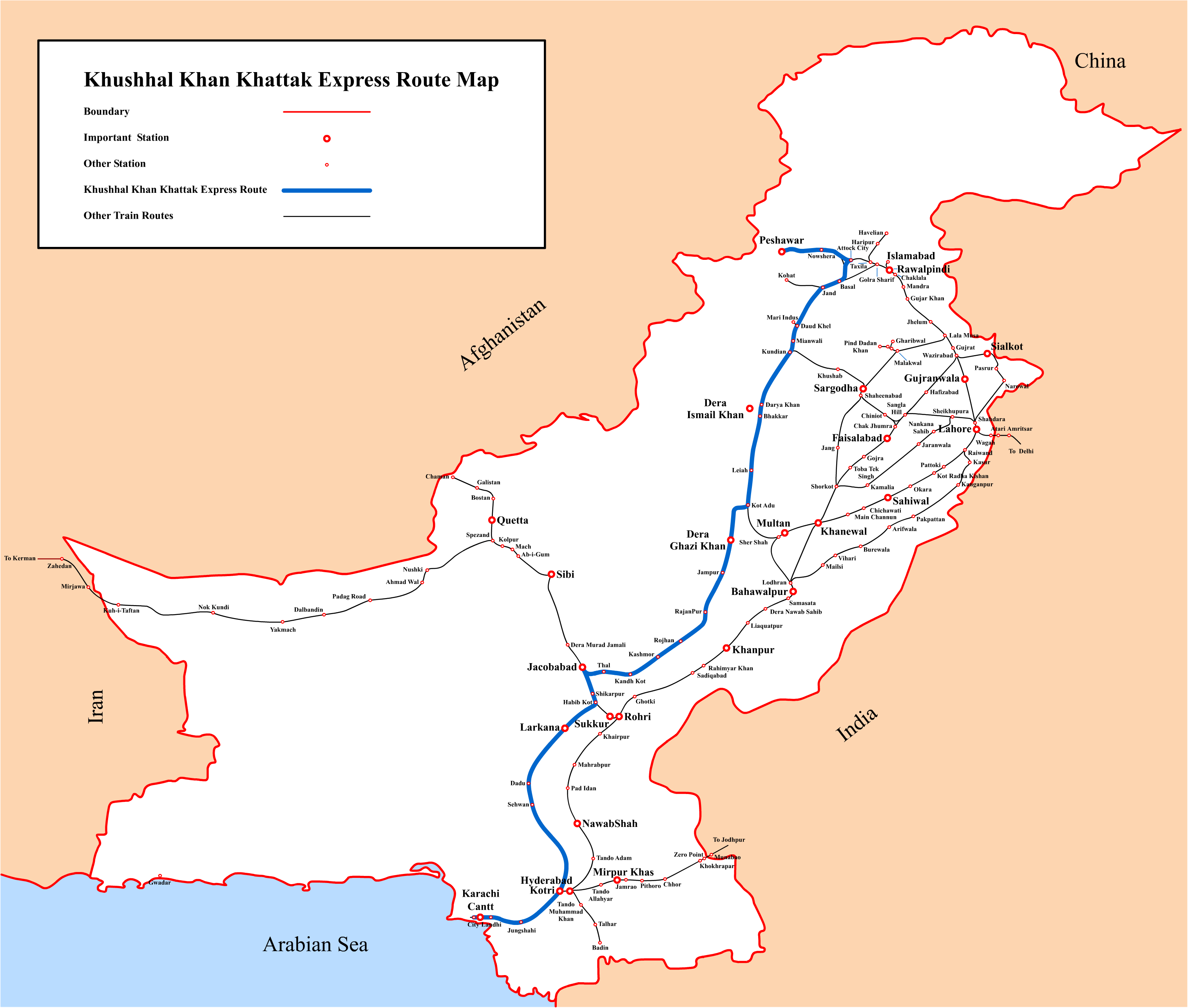
- Khushhal Khan Khattak Express route map

Khushhal Khan Khattak Express (Urdu: خوشحال خان خٹک ایکسپریس) is a passenger train operated daily by Pakistan Railways between Karachi and Peshawar. The trip takes approximately 34 hours and 15 minutes to cover a published distance of 1,512 kilometres (940 mi), traveling along a stretch of the Karachi–Peshawar Railway Line and Kotri–Attock Railway Line. The train named after Khushhal Khan Khattak, a Pashtun nationalist and poet, warrior, scholar, and chief of the Khattak tribe. Khushhal Khan Khattak Express was suspended in March 2020 due to Covid-19. After several delays, this train was restored on 24 April 2025. Khushal Khan Khattak Express is a unique train as it is the only train that connects Rajanpur, Dera Ghazi Khan and Kashmor to Karachi. It is also, the only passenger train in Pakistan with three Loco reversals along its route at Attock City Junction, Kot Addu Junction and Jacobabad Junction

== Route ==
- Karachi City–Kotri Junction via Karachi–Peshawar Railway Line
- Kotri Junction–Attock City Junction via Kotri–Attock Railway Line
- Attock City Junction–Peshawar Cantonment via Karachi–Peshawar Railway Line

== Station stops ==
- Karachi City
- Karachi Cantonment
- Drigh Road Junction
- Landhi Junction
- Dhabeji
- Kotri Junction
- Sindh University (Jamshoro)
- Sehwan Sharif
- Dadu
- Rehmani Nagar
- Radhan
- Badah
- Larkana Junction
- Shah Nawaz Bhutto
- Shikarpur
- Jacobabad Junction
- Haibat Shaheed
- Kandkot
- Kashmor Colony
- Mithan Kot
- Rajanpur
- Fazilpur Dhandi
- Jampur
- Dera Ghazi Khan
- Kot Adu Junction
- Leiah
- Karor
- Bhakkar
- Kallur Kot
- Piplan
- Kundian Junction
- Mianwali
- Daud Khel Junction
- Injra
- Chhab
- Jand Junction
- Basal Junction
- Jhalar
- Attock City Junction
- Jhangira Road
- Nowshera Junction
- Pabbi
- Peshawar City
- Peshawar Cantonment

== Rake Composition ==
The train only has Economy class coaches.
