= Kotla Laghari Halt railway station =

Railway station in Pakistan

Kotla Laghari Halt Railway Station

General information
- Owner: Ministry of Railways
- Line: Sher Shah–Kot Addu Branch Line

Other information
- Station code: KLRI

History
- Former names: Great Indian Peninsula Railway

Services
Preceding station	Pakistan Railways	Following station
Muzaffargarh towards Sher Shah Junction	Sher Shah–Kot Addu Branch Line	Budh towards Kot Adu Junction

Kotla Laghari Halt Railway Station (Urdu: کوٹلہ لغاری ہالٹ ریلوے اسٹیشن) is located in Pakistan. It is in Muzaffargarh District. It is home town of Leghari tribe of Muzaffargarh.

== See also ==
- List of railway stations in Pakistan
- Pakistan Railways
