= Bannu–Tank Branch Line =

Railway line in Pakistan

Overview
- Other name(s): Trans–Indus Railway
- Native name: بنوں–ٹانک فرعی ریلوے خط
- Status: Closed
- Owner: Pakistan Railways
- Termini: Bannu; Tank Junction
- Stations: 7

Service
- Operator(s): Pakistan Railways

History
- Opened: 1913
- Closed: 1995

Technical
- Line length: 122 km (76 mi)
- Track gauge: 762 mm (2 ft 6 in)

Bannu–Tank Branch Line (Urdu: بنوں–ٹانک فرعی ریلوے خط) was one of several branch lines in Pakistan, operated and maintained by Pakistan Railways. The line began at Bannu and ended at Tank Junction. The total length of this railway line was 122 kilometers (76 mi) with 7 railway stations. It was known by locals as "choti rail", since it was the only 762 mm (2 ft 6 in) narrow gauge railway in the country (excepting the stretch from Kohat Tehsil to Thal pre-1991) The line was dismantled in 1995.

== History ==
The rail line was originally built by NWR as the Trans–Indus Railway in 1913, which extended from Kalabagh station to Bannu station, which today is part of the Daud Khel–Lakki Marwat Branch Line. The line was then further extended in 1916 to reach Tank Junction station. The line was also sometimes referred to as the Mari Indus Railway.

== Closure ==
The line was dismantled in 1995.

== Stations ==
- Bannu
- Aba Khel
- Naurang Serai
- Lakki Marwat Junction
- Shahbaz Khel Halt
- Pezu
- Tank Junction

== See also ==
- Karachi–Peshawar Railway Line
- Railway lines in Pakistan
