= Shahbaz Khel Halt railway station =

Railway station in Pakistan

Coordinates: 32.416501°N 70.758127°E

Shahbaz Khel Halt Station شہباز خیل ہالٹ اسٹیشن

General information
- Owner: Ministry of Railways
- Line: Bannu–Tank Branch Line

Other information
- Station code: SXL

Services
Preceding station	Pakistan Railways	Following station
Laki Marwat Junction towards Bannu	Bannu–Tank Branch Line	Pezu towards Tank Junction
Location

Shahbaz Khel Halt Railway Station (Urdu: شہباز خیل ہالٹ ریلوے اسٹیشن) is located in Pakistan.

== See also ==
- List of railway stations in Pakistan
- Pakistan Railways
