= Mianwali Express =

Overview
- Service type: Inter-city rail
- First service: 2019
- Current operator: Pakistan Railways

Route
- Termini: Lahore Junction; Mari Indus
- Stops: 13
- Distance travelled: 466 kilometres (290 mi)
- Average journey time: 9 hours
- Service frequency: Daily
- Train numbers: 147UP (Lahore→Mari Indus); 148DN (Mari Indus→Lahore)

On-board services
- Classes: Economy Class; AC Standard
- Seating arrangements: Available
- Sleeping arrangements: Available
- Baggage facilities: Available

Technical
- Track gauge: 1,676 mm (5 ft 6 in)
- Track owner: Pakistan Railways

Mianwali Express is a passenger train operated daily by Pakistan Railways between Lahore and Mari Indus. The trip takes approximately 9 hours to complete its journey of 466 kilometres (290 mi) traveling along a stretch of the Karachi–Peshawar Railway Line, Shahdara Bagh–Sangla Hill Branch Line, Khanewal–Wazirabad Branch Line, Chak Jhumra-Kundian Branch Line, Kotri–Attock Railway Line and Daud Khel–Lakki Marwat Branch Line.

== History ==
This train was suspended in 1990s, due to unknown reasons. Mianwali Express was inaugurated by the then Prime Minister of Pakistan Imran Khan on 19 July 2019 at Mianwali Railway Station. On 25 November 2021, the train was outsourced to SSR Group.. Currently, the train is running under Pakistan Railways management.

== Route ==
- Lahore Junction–Shahdara Bagh Junction via Karachi–Peshawar Railway Line
- Shahdara Bagh Junction–Sangla Hill Junction via Shahdara Bagh–Sangla Hill Branch Line
- Sangla Hill Junction–Chak Jhumra Junction via Khanewal–Wazirabad Branch Line
- Chak Jhumra Junction–Kundian Junction via Chak Jhumra–Kundian Branch Line
- Kundian Junction–Daud Khel Junction via Kotri–Attock Railway Line
- Daud Khel Junction–Mari Indus via Daud Khel–Lakki Marwat Branch Line

== Station stops ==
- Lahore Junction
- Shahdara Bagh Junction
- Qila Sheikhupura Junction
- Sangla Hill Junction
- Chiniot
- Shahinabad Junction
- Sargodha Junction
- Khushab Junction
- Quaidabad
- Wanbhachran
- Kundian Junction
- Mianwali
- Pai Khel
- Daud Khel Junction
- Mari Indus

== Equipment ==
Mianwali Express offers AC Standard and Economy Class seating.

== See also ==
- Mianwali railway station
