= Naurang Serai Sugar Mill Siding railway station =

Railway station in Pakistan

Naurang Serai Sugar Mill Siding Station نورنگ سرائے شکر سازی کارخانہ بغلي پٹري ریلوے اسٹیشن

General information
- Owner: Ministry of Railways
- Line: Bannu–Tank Branch Line

Other information
- Station code: NUSM

Services
Preceding station	Pakistan Railways	Following station
Aba Khel towards Bannu	Bannu–Tank Branch Line	Laki Marwat Junction towards Tank Junction

Naurang Serai Sugar Mill Siding Railway Station (Urdu: نورنگ سرائے شکر سازی کارخانہ بغلي پٹري ریلوے اسٹیشن) is located in Lakki Marwat District, Khyber Pakhtunkhwa, Pakistan.

== See also ==
- List of railway stations in Pakistan
- Pakistan Railways
