= Trag railway station =

Railway station in Pakistan

Trag Railway Station تراگ ریلوے اسٹیشن

General information
- Coordinates: 32.7884°N 71.2852°E
- Owner: Ministry of Railways
- Line: Daud Khel–Lakki Marwat Branch Line

Other information
- Station code: TGX

Services
Preceding station	Pakistan Railways	Following station
Kamar Mashani towards Daud Khel Junction	Daud Khel–Lakki Marwat Branch Line	Isa Khel towards Laki Marwat Junction
Location

Trag Railway Station (Urdu: تراگ ریلوے اسٹیشن) is located in Pakistan.

== See also ==
- List of railway stations in Pakistan
- Pakistan Railways
