= List of roads in Muzaffargarh =

This is the list of roads in Muzaffargarh. N-70 National Highway is major road go through city.

== Along with Motorways ==
Name	From	To	Prominent Places on Road
Lahore Road	Muzaffargarh	Lahore	Multan, Khanewal, Sahiwal, Chichawatni
Dera Ghazi Khan Road	Muzaffargarh	Dera Ghazi Khan	Baseera, Chowk Qureshi, Ghazi Ghat
Jhang Road	Jhang Mord	Jhang	Murad Abad, Rang pur, Ahmad pur siyal, Shorkot
Mianwali Road	Khan pur	Mianwali	Chowk Sarwer Shaheed
Ali pur Road	Muzaffargarh	Alipur	Khan garh, Rohaila Wali, Jatoi
Multan Road	Muzaffargarh	Multan	Sher Shah

== Other populated roads ==
Name	From	To	Prominent Places on Road
Garden Road	Ganish Wah Canal	Sabzi Mandi	
Basti Maharan Road	TMA Chowk	Basti Maharan	
Dasti Wala Road	Yadgar Chowk	Dasti Wala	
Committee Road	Fayyaz Park	Municipal Plaza	
Rawlay Wala Road	Petrol Pump Multan Road	Moh Rawlay Wala	
Qaim Wala Road			
Chor Shah Road			
Bhutta Pur Road			
Railway Road	Qinwan Chowk	Muzaffargarh railway station	Sherwani Chowk
Tailri Road	Kachery Chowk	Mouza Tailri	Ganish Wah Canal, Tailri Bypass,
Bypass Road	Kachery Chowk	Ali Pur bypass	DHQ Hospital
Sher Shah Road	Muzaffargarh	Sher Shah Interchange	
Multan Road	Muzaffargarh	Dera Adda	Shershad, Muzaffarabad Multan, Nadirabad, Aziz Hotel
Jail Road	Kachery Chowk	Purani Chungi	District Jail
Khangarh Road	Muzaffargarh	Khangarh	Ali pur Bypass
Khangarh Shah Jamal Road	Khangarh	Shah Jamal	
Shah Jamal Road	Thal Chowk	Shah Jamal	
Circular Road			Circular around old city
Old Bhuta Pur Road	Railway Road	Bhuta pur	
Old Rangpur Road			
Girls College Road		Girls College	At Girls College road connects Alipur Road
Chak Rohari Road			
Taliri Bypass Road			
Commercial / Commerce College Road			
Social Security Road			
District Office Road			

== See also ==
- List of places in Muzaffargarh
