= Jatoi =

Jatoi may refer to:

- Jatoi (tribe), a Baloch tribe of Pakistan
- Jatoi, Muzaffargarh, a city in Punjab, Pakistan
  - Jatoi Tehsil, Pakistan
- Ghulam Mustafa Jatoi (1931-2009), Pakistani politician
