= Sher Shah–Kot Addu Branch Line =

Railway line in Pakistan

Sher Shah–Kot Addu Branch Line شیر شاہ–کوٹ ادو فرعی ریلوے خط

Overview
- Owner: Pakistan Railways
- Termini: Sher Shah Junction; Kot Adu Junction
- Stations: 10

Service
- Operator: Pakistan Railways

Technical
- Line length: 74 km (46 mi)

Sher Shah–Kot Addu Branch Line (Urdu: شیر شاہ–کوٹ ادو فرعی ریلوے خط) is one of several branch lines in Pakistan, operated and maintained by Pakistan Railways. The line begins at Sher Shah Junction on the Karachi–Peshawar Railway Line and ends at Kot Addu Junction on the Kotri–Attock Railway Line. The total length of this railway line is 74 kilometers (46 mi) with 10 railway stations.

The line serves as an important link between the Karachi–Peshawar Railway Line (Main Line 1) and Kotri–Attock Railway Line (Main Line 2).

== Stations ==
- Sher Shah Junction
- Chenab West Bank
- Muzaffargarh
- Muzaffargarh Thermal Power Station
- Kotla Laghari Halt
- Budh
- Pir Barkhuradar Halt
- Hamdaniwala Halt
- Lal Pir (Abandoned)
- Mahmud Kot
- Gurmani
- Sanawan
- Lal Mir Halt
- Kot Adu Junction

== See also ==
- Kotri–Attock Railway Line
- Karachi–Peshawar Railway Line
- Railway lines in Pakistan
