= MZG =

MZG or mzg may refer to:

- MZG, the IATA code for Penghu Airport, Huxi, Taiwan
- MZG, the station code for Muzaffargarh railway station, Pakistan
- mzg, the ISO 639-3 code for Monastic sign languages, Europe
