= Isa Khel railway station =

Railway station in Pakistan

Isa Khel Railway Station عیسیٰ خیل ریلوے اسٹیشن

General information
- Coordinates: 32.6779°N 71.2665°E
- Owner: Ministry of Railways
- Line: Daud Khel–Lakki Marwat Branch Line

Other information
- Station code: IKH

History
- Opened: 15 June 1913
- Closed: 1995

Services
Preceding station	Pakistan Railways	Following station
Trag towards Daud Khel Junction	Daud Khel–Lakki Marwat Branch Line	Laki Marwat Junction Terminus
Location

Isa Khel Railway Station (Urdu: عیسیٰ خیل ریلوے اسٹیشن) is located in Pakistan. This station was closed in 1995.

== See also ==
- List of railway stations in Pakistan
- Pakistan Railways
