= Daud Khel–Lakki Marwat Branch Line =

Former railway line in Pakistan

Daud Khel–Lakki Marwat Branch Line داؤُدخيل–لکی مروت فرعی ریلوے خط

Overview
- Status: Closed
- Owner: Pakistan Railways
- Termini: Daud Khel Junction; Lakki Marwat Junction

Service
- Operator(s): Pakistan Railways

History
- Opened: 1913
- Closed: 1995

Technical
- Line length: 92 km (57 mi)
- Track gauge: 762 mm (2 ft 6 in)

Daud Khel–Lakki Marwat Branch Line (داؤُدخيل–لکی مروت فرعی ریلوے خط) was one of several branch lines in Pakistan, operated and maintained by Pakistan Railways. The line began at Daud Khel Junction and ended at Lakki Marwat Junction. The total length of this railway line was 92 kilometers (57 mi) with 7 railway stations. It was known by locals as "choti rail", since it was the only 762 mm (2 ft 6 in) narrow gauge railway in the country. The line was dismantled in 1995., The line is now only active from Daud Khel To Mari Indus which is 10 kilometers (6.2 mi)

== History ==
The rail line was originally built by NWR as the Trans–Indus Railway in 1913, which extended from Kalabagh station to Bannu station. The line was then further extended in 1916 to reach Tank Junction station, which today is part of the Bannu–Tank Branch Line. The line was also sometimes referred to as the Mari Indus Railway.

== Closure ==
The line was dismantled in 1995.

== Stations ==
- Daud Khel Junction
- Mari Indus

Closed Section

- Kalabagh
- Kamar Mashani
- Trag
- Isa Khel
- Arsala Khan
- Lakki Marwat Junction

== See also ==
- Karachi–Peshawar Railway Line
- Railway lines in Pakistan
