= KZL =

KZL or kzl may refer to:

- KZL, the station code for Kashmor Junction railway station, Sindh, Pakistan
- kzl, the ISO 639-3 code for Kayeli language, an extinct Austronesian language in Indonesia
