= KWZ =

KWZ or kwz may refer to:

- KWZ, the DS100 code for Wuppertal Zoologischer Garten station, North Rhine-Westphalia, Germany
- KWZ, the IATA code for Kolwezi Airport, Democratic Republic of the Congo
- KWZ, the station code for Kalabagh railway station, Pakistan
- kwz, the ISO 639-3 code for Kwadi language, Angola
