= BXU =

BXU or bxu may refer to:

- Bannu railway station (Station code: BXU), an abandoned railway station in Bannu, Pakistan
- Bancasi Airport (IATA: BXU), an airport serving Butuan, Philippines
- China Buriat language (ISO 639-3: bxu), a Mongolic language spoken in China
