= Mari Indus railway station =

Railway station in Pakistan

Mari Indus Railway Station ماڑی انڈس ریلوے اسٹیشن

General information
- Coordinates: 32.9551°N 71.5618°E
- Owner: Ministry of Railways
- Line: Daud Khel–Lakki Marwat Branch Line
- Platforms: 1
- Tracks: 2

Other information
- Station code: MAT

History
- Opened: 1891

Services
Preceding station	Pakistan Railways	Following station
Daud Khel Junction Terminus	Daud Khel–Lakki Marwat Branch Line	Kalabagh towards Laki Marwat Junction
Location

Mari Indus Railway Station (Urdu: ماڑی انڈس ریلوے اسٹیشن) is located in Mari Indus, in Mianwali District of Pakistan's Punjab province. The station was constructed in 1891.

== Train routes ==
The following trains stop/terminate/originate from the Mari Indus station:

Preceding station	Pakistan Railways	Following station
Terminus	Attock Passenger	Massan towards Attock City Junction

== See also ==
- List of railway stations in Pakistan
- Pakistan Railways
