= Kamar Mashani railway station =

Railway station in Kamar Mushani, Pakistan

Kamar Mashani Station کمر مشانی ریلوے اسٹیشن

General information
- Coordinates: 32.8481°N 71.3607°E
- Owner: Ministry of Railways
- Line: Daud Khel–Lakki Marwat Branch Line

Other information
- Station code: KQH

Services
Preceding station	Pakistan Railways	Following station
Kalabagh towards Daud Khel Junction	Daud Khel–Lakki Marwat Branch Line	Trag towards Laki Marwat Junction
Location

Kamar Mushani Railway Station (Urdu: کمر مشانی ریلوے اسٹیشن) is located in Pakistan.

== See also ==
- List of railway stations in Pakistan
- Pakistan Railways
