= Pezu railway station =

Railway station in Pakistan

Pezu Railway Station پیزو ریلوے اسٹیشن

General information
- Coordinates: 32.3284261°N 70.7142322°E
- Owner: Ministry of Railways
- Line: Bannu–Tank Branch Line

Other information
- Station code: PZU

Services
Preceding station	Pakistan Railways	Following station
Shahbaz Khel Halt towards Bannu	Bannu–Tank Branch Line	Tank Junction Terminus
Location

Pezu is a Railway Station (Urdu: پیزو ریلوے اسٹیشن) is located in Pezu, Lakki Marwat District, khyber pakhtunkhwa. It is a part of Bannu-Tank Branch Line operated by Pakistan Railways. This station code is PZU.

== See also ==
- List of railway stations in Pakistan
- Pakistan Railways
