= KQH =

KQH may refer to:

- KQH, the IATA code for Kishangarh Airport, Rajasthan, India
- KQH, the station code for Kamar Mashani railway station, Pakistan
