= Aba Khel railway station =

Railway station in Pakistan

Aba Khel Railway Station ابا خیل ریلوے اسٹیشن

General information
- Coordinates: 32.8837°N 71.5815°E
- Owner: Ministry of Railways
- Line: Bannu–Tank Branch Line

Other information
- Station code: ABK

Services
Preceding station	Pakistan Railways	Following station
Bannu Terminus	Bannu–Tank Branch Line	Naurang Serai Sugar Mill Siding towards Tank Junction
Location

Aba Khel Railway Station (Urdu: ابا خیل ریلوے اسٹیشن) is located in Khyber Pakhtunkhwa, Pakistan.

== See also ==
- List of railway stations in Pakistan
- Pakistan Railways
