= Budh railway station =

Railway station in Pakistan

Coordinates: 30°08′N 71°03′E

Budh Railway Station بدھ ریلوے اسٹیشن

General information
- Owner: Ministry of Railways
- Line: Sher Shah–Kot Addu Branch Line

Other information
- Station code: BVD

Services
Preceding station	Pakistan Railways	Following station
Muzaffargarh towards Sher Shah Junction	Sher Shah–Kot Addu Branch Line	Mahmud Kot towards Kot Adu Junction
Location

Budh Railway Station (Urdu: بدھ ریلوے اسٹیشن) is located in Pakistan.

== See also ==
- List of railway stations in Pakistan
- Pakistan Railways
