= GLW =

GLW may refer to:

- Corning Inc., an American technology company with stock symbol GLW
- Gale warning
- Gilawala railway station, in Pakistan
- Glasgow Municipal Airport, in Kentucky, United States
- Glavda language
- Green Left Weekly, an Australian socialist newspaper
- Guitar and Lute Workshop, a defunct American instrument maker
- German equivalent water level
