= Chenab West Bank railway station =

Railway station in Pakistan

Coordinates: 30.078919°N 71.273007°E

Chenab West Bank Station چناب مغربی بند اسٹیشن

General information
- Owner: Ministry of Railways
- Line: Sher Shah–Kot Addu Branch Line

Other information
- Station code: CWB

Services
Preceding station	Pakistan Railways	Following station
Sher Shah Junction Terminus	Sher Shah–Kot Addu Branch Line	Muzaffargarh towards Kot Adu Junction
Location

Chenab West Bank Railway Station (Urdu: چناب مغربی بند اسٹیشن) is located at west bank of river Chenab at Muzaffargarh to Multan road, Pakistan.

== See also ==
- List of railway stations in Pakistan
- Pakistan Railways
