= Bakhshapur railway station =

Railway station in Sindh, Pakistan

Bakhshapur Railway Station بخشاپور ریلوے اسٽيشن

General information
- Coordinates: 28.363655°N 69.379171°E
- Owner: Ministry of Railways
- Line: Kotri–Attock Railway Line

Other information
- Station code: BXZ

Services
Preceding station	Pakistan Railways	Following station
Kandkot towards Kotri Junction	Kotri–Attock Line	Kashmor Junction towards Attock City Junction
Location

Bakhshapur Railway Station (Urdu: بخشا پور ریلوے اسٹیشن, Sindhi: بخشاپور ریلوي اسٽیشن) is located in District kashmore, Sindh Pakistan.

== See also ==
- List of railway stations in Pakistan
- Pakistan Railways
