= Dilmurad railway station =

Railway station in Pakistan

Dilmurad Railway Station دلمراد ریلوے اسٹیشن دلمراد ريلوي اسٽيشن

General information
- Coordinates: 28.2826°N 68.5854°E
- Owner: Ministry of Railways
- Line: Kotri–Attock Railway Line

Other information
- Station code: DMQ

Services
Preceding station	Pakistan Railways	Following station
Jacobabad Junction towards Kotri Junction	Kotri–Attock Line	Haibat Shahid towards Attock City Junction
Location

Dilmurad Railway Station (Urdu: دلمراد ریلوے اسٹیشن, Sindhi: دلمراد ریلوي اسٽیشن) is located in Pakistan.

== See also ==
- Pakistan Railways
