= Kalabagh railway station =

Railway station in Punjab, Pakistan

Kalabagh Railway Station کالاباغ ریلوے اسٹیشن

General information
- Coordinates: 32.9607°N 71.5362°E
- Owner: Ministry of Railways
- Line: Daud Khel–Lakki Marwat Branch Line

Other information
- Station code: KWZ

History
- Opened: 1913

Services
Preceding station	Pakistan Railways	Following station
Mari Indus towards Daud Khel Junction	Daud Khel–Lakki Marwat Branch Line	Kamar Mashani towards Laki Marwat Junction
Location

Kalabagh Railway Station (Urdu: کالاباغ ریلوے اسٹیشن) is located in Pakistan. Construction of this narrow-gauge line began around 1911 using equipment borrowed from the 'Light Military Reserve Railway'. The line was officially opened to traffic in 1913 as the eastern terminus of the Trans-Indus (Kalabagh to Bannu) Railway (a 2-foot-6-inch or 762 mm narrow-gauge line). Prior to the construction of a permanent bridge over the Indus River, the transport of passengers and goods between Mari Indus (the broad-gauge terminus on the eastern bank) and Kalabagh (on the western bank) was carried out via steam ferry. Kalabagh Railway Station—located on the western bank of the Indus River in the Mianwali district of Punjab—was built in 1913 during the British Raj.

Kalabagh Railway Station is now an abandoned infrastructure. All that remains of the station today is a warehouse with a locked door. Faint markings on its façade reveal the word "Kalabagh" to the keen observer; this is the only remaining sign of its identity as a railway station. Before it lies a dilapidated railway track along which steam engines once hauled trains all the way to Bannu.

== See also ==
- List of railway stations in Pakistan
- Pakistan Railways
