= Gurmani railway station =

Railway station in Pakistan

Coordinates: 30.274903°N 70.972497°E

Gurmani Railway Station گرمانی ریلوے اسٹیشن

General information
- Owner: Ministry of Railways
- Line: Sher Shah–Kot Addu Branch Line

Other information
- Station code: GUI

Services
Preceding station	Pakistan Railways	Following station
Mahmud Kot towards Sher Shah Junction	Sher Shah–Kot Addu Branch Line	Sanawan towards Kot Adu Junction
Location

Gurmani Railway Station (Urdu: گرمانی ریلوے اسٹیشن) is located in town of Gurmani, District Muzaffargarh, Pakistan.

== See also ==
- List of railway stations in Pakistan
- Pakistan Railways
