= Arsala Khan railway station =

Railway station in Pakistan

Arsala Khan Railway Station ارسالا خان ریلوے اسٹیشن

General information
- Owner: Ministry of Railways
- Line: Daud Khel–Lakki Marwat Branch Line

Other information
- Station code: ARSK

Arsala Khan Railway Station (Urdu: ارسالا خان ریلوے اسٹیشن) is located in Pakistan.

== See also ==
- List of railway stations in Pakistan
- Pakistan Railways
