= Shadan Lund railway station =

Railway station in Pakistan

Shadan Lund Railway Station شادن لنڈ ریلوے اسٹیشن

General information
- Coordinates: 30.4635°N 70.7256°E
- Owner: Ministry of Railways
- Line: Kotri–Attock Railway Line

Other information
- Station code: SHDL

Services
Preceding station	Pakistan Railways	Following station
Langar towards Kotri Junction	Kotri–Attock Line	Kot Adu Junction towards Attock City Junction
Location

Shadan Lund Railway Station (Urdu: شادن لنڈ ریلوے اسٹیشن, Punjabi: شدن لند ریلوے اسٹیشن, Balochi: شدن لند ریلوے اسٹیشن) is located in Shadan Lund, Dera Ghazi Khan District in Punjab, Pakistan.

On November 9, 2001, the station was the site of a protest against airstrikes in Afghanistan by the United States military, with approximately 1,000 Muslim protesters. Police opened fire, killing four, when some protesters attempted to block a train.

== See also ==
- List of railway stations in Pakistan
- Pakistan Railways
