= Chak railway station =

Railway station in Pakistan

Chak Railway Station چک ریلوے اسٹیشن

General information
- Coordinates: 29.9465°N 71.3242°E
- Owner: Ministry of Railways
- Line: Karachi–Peshawar Railway Line

Other information
- Station code: CAK

Services
Preceding station	Pakistan Railways	Following station
Shujabad towards Kiamari	Karachi–Peshawar Line	Sher Shah Junction towards Peshawar Cantonment
Location

Chak Railway Station (Urdu and Punjabi: چک ریلوے اسٹیشن) is located in Chak village, Multan district of Punjab province of the Pakistan.

== See also ==
- List of railway stations in Pakistan
- Pakistan Railways
