= Zarif Shaheed railway station =

Railway station in Pakistan

Zarif Shaheed Railway Station ظریف شہید ریلوےاسٹیشن

General information
- Coordinates: 29.7949°N 71.4039°E
- Owner: Ministry of Railways
- Line: Karachi–Peshawar Railway Line

Other information
- Station code: ZRSD

Services
Preceding station	Pakistan Railways	Following station
Gilawala towards Kiamari	Karachi–Peshawar Line	Shujabad towards Peshawar Cantonment
Location

Zarif Shaheed Railway Station (Urdu and Punjabi: ظریف شہید ریلوے اسٹیشن) is located in Zarif Shaheed village, Multan district of Punjab province, Pakistan.

== See also ==
- List of railway stations in Pakistan
- Pakistan Railways
