= Shah Nal railway station =

Railway station in Pakistan

Coordinates: 29.618419°N 71.560154°E

Shah Nal Railway Station شاہ نال ریلوے اسٹیشن

General information
- Owner: Ministry of Railways
- Line: Karachi–Peshawar Railway Line

Other information
- Station code: SFL

Services
Preceding station	Pakistan Railways	Following station
Lodhran Junction towards Kiamari	Karachi–Peshawar Line	Gilawala towards Peshawar Cantonment
Location

Shah Nal Railway Station (Urdu and Punjabi: شاہ نال ریلوے اسٹیشن) is located in Shah Nal village, Lodhran district of Punjab province, Pakistan.

== See also ==
- List of railway stations in Pakistan
- Pakistan Railways
