= Shujabad railway station =

Railway station in Pakistan

Shujabad Railway Station شجاع آباد ریلوے اسٹیشن

General information
- Coordinates: 29.8731°N 71.3243°E
- Owner: Ministry of Railways
- Line: Karachi–Peshawar Railway Line

Other information
- Station code: SJB

Services
Preceding station	Pakistan Railways	Following station
Zarif Shaheed towards Kiamari	Karachi–Peshawar Line	Chak towards Peshawar Cantonment
Location

Shujabad Railway Station (Urdu and Punjabi: شجاع آباد ریلوے اسٹیشن) is located in the city of Shujabad, in Multan district of Punjab province, Pakistan.

== See also ==
- List of railway stations in Pakistan
- Pakistan Railways
