= Mianwali railway station =

Railway station in Mianwali, Pakistan

Mianwali Station میانوالی اسٹیشن
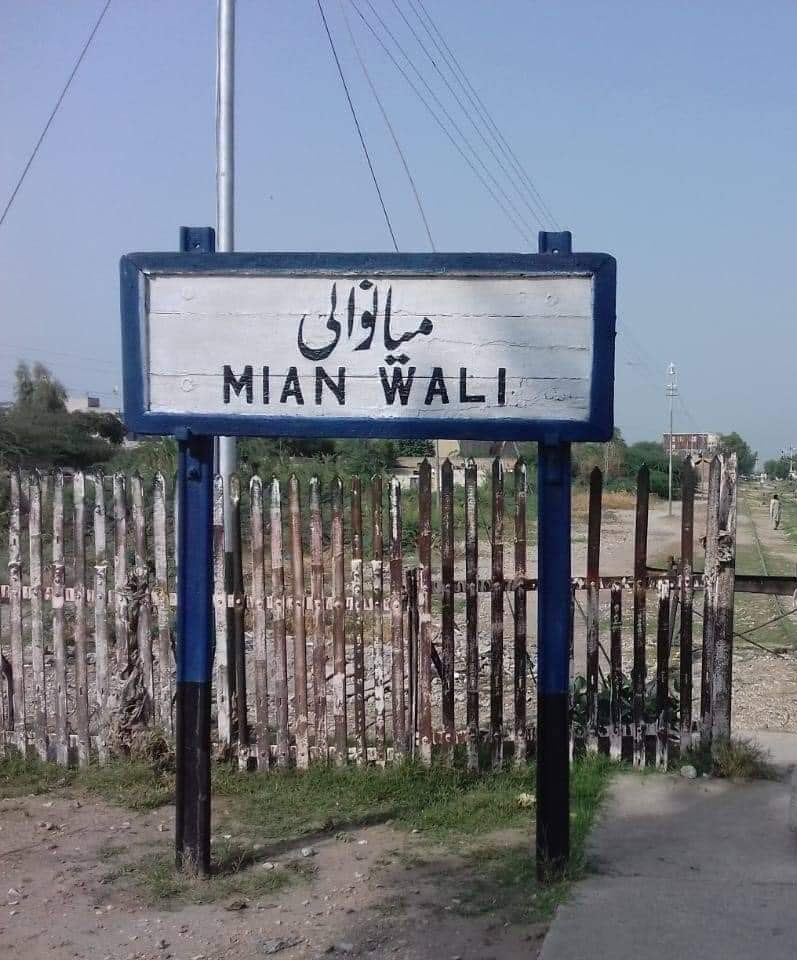

General information
- Location: Mianwali, Punjab, Pakistan
- Coordinates: 32.5793°N 71.5352°E
- Owner: Ministry of Railways
- Line: Kotri–Attock Railway Line

Other information
- Station code: MWI

History
- Opened: March 18, 1892

Services
Preceding station	Pakistan Railways	Following station
Kundian Junction towards Kotri Junction	Kotri–Attock Line	Pai Khel towards Attock City Junction
Location

Mianwali railway station (Urdu: میانوالی ریلوے اسٹیشن) is located in Mianwali, Pakistan. It is the main railway station of Mianwali district. Currently three passenger trains have stoppage here which are Mianwali Express, Thal Express and Mehr Express.

== See also ==
- List of railway stations in Pakistan
- Pakistan Railways
- Mianwali Express
