= Gwadar–Mastung Railway =

Proposed railway line in Pakistan

Overview
- Status: Proposed
- Owner: Government of Pakistan
- Locale: Gwadar, Mastung
- Termini: Gwadar; Mastung

Service
- Type: Railway
- System: Pakistan Railways
- Operator(s): Pakistan Railways

Technical
- Line length: 900 km (560 mi)

The Gwadar–Mastung Railway is a proposed railway line in Pakistan, which will connect the port city of Gwadar to Mastung. The project is part of the government's broader plan to improve the country's railway infrastructure and strengthen its connections with other countries.

== Background ==
The government of Pakistan is providing funding for this project, and the Ministry of Railways (Pakistan) is anticipated to request budget allocation for the project in the upcoming budget cycle. The estimated cost of the Gwadar–Mastung Railway project is Rs 180.2 billion. This initiative aims to build a wide-gauge railway spanning around 900 kilometers. The Ministry of Railways is anticipated to present a project plan (PC-1) for the new railway tracks in the near future.

== Construction ==
The railway line's construction is set to start shortly, aligning with the government's larger initiative to modernize 119 aging diesel-electric locomotives and enhance the current rail infrastructure. The Ministry of Railways is in the process of finalizing the project's details.

The railway line is expected to be extended from Gwadar to Quetta.
