= Gamoon wala =

Gamoon Wala
- village
- Country: Pakistan
- Province: Punjab
- District: Muzaffargarh
- Time zone: UTC+5 (PST)

Gamoon Wala is a village of Muzaffargarh District in the Punjab province of Pakistan. It is 20 km from the city of Muzaffargarh, near Chok Godar.

== Dominant tribe and chief ==
Dominant tribe is Sohrani a sub-tribe of Baloch tribe. This village was established about 250 years ago when Ghulam Hussain Sohrani migrated here during great Baloch Wars. The most popular chief was Sardar Allah Dad Khan Sohrani (late) and Dr. Faiz Bakhsh Khan Sohrani who died in a roadside accident on 29.10.1998.

== Population ==
Its population is 1,000 people with 49% males and 51% females.

== Economy ==
Its economy is based on agriculture, business and government jobs. Following crops are grown:

- Wheat
- Cotton
- Rice
- Sugarcane
- Mango
- Date palm
- Sorghum
- Barseem

== Education ==
Gamoon Wala has one girls' primary school, with an enrollment of 500 students. The school was established in 1989. Literacy rate is 95% which is higher than any surrounding area.

== Infrastructure ==
It is linked with fully furnished road. It has bricked streets. Drainage system is up to date. TCF schools which are very advanced and up to date are also near to it and most of the students go there. Super Stores are also established fulfilling the demands of people. Volleyball, cricket and football is liked by most of the people.
