= Mahmud Kot railway station =

Railway station in Pakistan

Mahmud Kot Station محمود کوٹ ریلوے اسٹیشن

General information
- Coordinates: 30.1965°N 70.9757°E
- Owner: Ministry of Railways
- Line: Sher Shah–Kot Addu Branch Line

Other information
- Station code: MHK

Services
Preceding station	Pakistan Railways	Following station
Muzaffargarh towards Sher Shah Junction	Sher Shah–Kot Addu Branch Line	Gurmani towards Kot Adu Junction
Location

Mahmud Kot or Mehmood Kot Railway Station (Urdu: محمود کوٹ ریلوے اسٹیشن, Punjabi: محمود کوٹ ریلوے اسٹیشن) is located in the town of Mehmood Kot, Muzaffargarh district of Muzaffargarh, Pakistan.

== See also ==
- List of railway stations in Pakistan
- Pakistan Railways
