= Bhakkar railway station =

Railway station in Bhakkar, Pakistan

Bhakkar Railway Station بھکر ریلوے اسٹیشن

General information
- Coordinates: 31.6220°N 71.0649°E
- Owner: Ministry of Railways
- Line: Kotri–Attock Railway Line

Other information
- Station code: BHKR

History
- Opened: 1928

Services
Preceding station	Pakistan Railways	Following station
Sultan Karori Halt towards Kotri Junction	Kotri–Attock Line	Kotla Jam towards Attock City Junction
Location

Bhakkar Railway Station (Urdu: بھکر ریلوے اسٹیشن, Punjabi: بھکر ریلوے اسٹیشن) is a railway station located in Bhakkar, Pakistan.

== See also ==
- List of railway stations in Pakistan
- Pakistan Railways

== Trains Stops ==
Serial No	Train Name	Previous Stop	Next Stop
01	Mehr Express	Darya Khan	Behal
02	Thal Express	Darya Khan	Behal
03	Khushal Khan Khattak Express	Darya Khan	Karor
04	Multan Passenger (Suspended)	Darya Khan	Notak
