= Sanawan =

Sanawan سناوان
- City
- Location within Punjab, Pakistan Location within Pakistan
- Coordinates: 30°19′N 70°59′E
- Country: Pakistan
- Province: Punjab
- District: Kot Addu
- Tehsil: Kot Addu
- Elevation: 394 m (1,293 ft)

Population
  - Estimate: 150,000+
- Time zone: UTC+5 (PST)
- Calling code: 066
- Website: www.sanawan.com

Sanawan is a town in Kot Addu District of Punjab, Pakistan. . It is located at 30°19′N 70°59′E.

== See also ==
- Sanawan railway station
