= Faisal Stadium =

Multi-purpose stadium in Pakistan

- فیصل سٹیڈیم
- Interactive map of Faisal Stadium
- Address: Dera Ghazi Khan Road, Muzaffargarh; Pakistan
- Coordinates: 30°4′19.02″N 71°10′35.06″E
- Elevation: 123 m (404 ft)
- Capacity: 1000 approx
- Parking: Yes

Construction
- Renovated: 12 October 2019

Faisal Stadium (Urdu: فیصل سٹیڈیم) is situated in Muzaffargarh, Pakistan. This is multi-purpose stadium. The stadium has basket ball court, cricket ground, squash court, wrestling ground, an auditorium and grass plot. This is biggest ground of city for sports and political events. The main ground is used for cricket, football and hockey matches as well as political events.

== See also ==
- List of stadiums in Pakistan
- List of cricket grounds in Pakistan
