= Massan railway station =

Railway station in Pakistan

Coordinates: 32.928246°N 71.719702°E

Massan Railway Station مسان ریلوے اسٹیشن

General information
- Owner: Ministry of Railways
- Line: Kotri–Attock Railway Line

Other information
- Station code: MSY

Services
Preceding station	Pakistan Railways	Following station
Daud Khel Junction towards Kotri Junction	Kotri–Attock Line	Sohan Bridge towards Attock City Junction
Location

Massan Railway Station (Urdu: مسان ریلوے اسٹیشن) is located in Pakistan.

== See also ==
- List of railway stations in Pakistan
- Pakistan Railways
