= Yadgar Club =

- یادگار کلب
- Interactive map of the Yadgar Club area
- Former names: Victoria Memorial Hall

General information
- Location: Muzaffargarh, Near Yadgar Chowk, Dasti Wala Road, Muzaffargarh, Punjab, Pakistan
- Coordinates: 30°4′2.93″N 71°11′22.59″E
- Construction started: 1909
- Renovated: In 1988 and In 2019

Yadgar Club, formerly known as Victoria Memorial Hall, is a colonial-era building situated in Muzaffargarh, Pakistan.

Built in 1909, the building was initially named the Victoria Memorial Hall before the Deputy Commissioner of Dera Ghazi Khan renamed it to Yadgar Club in 1988. The total area of Yadgar Club is 18 Kanals. Yadgar Club was renovated in 2019 after being neglected for many decades.

== History ==
The building was constructed in the memory of Queen Victoria who died in 1901. This building was built with the donations from the general public and government officials. Lala Kedar Nath, District Judge, supervised the construction of building. The club was used by the Muzaffargarh Club, District Board and Government Girls College at different times. The District Board and Government Girls College got separate buildings later.

== Facilities ==
Yadgar Club has many facilities like.

- Main Hall
- Snooker Room
- Swimming Pool
- Squash Court
- Badminton Court
- Tennis Courts
- Gymnasium
- Food Court
- Dining hall
- Rest room.
