= Faqirwala =

- Location within Pakistan
- Coordinates: 30.55°N 70.52°E
- Country: Pakistan
- Province: Punjab
- Elevation: 133 m (436 ft)
- Time zone: UTC+5 (PST)

Faqirwala is a village in the Punjab of Pakistan.
