= Gilawala railway station =

Railway station in Punjab, Pakistan

Gilawala Railway Station گیلے والہ ریلوے اسٹیشن

General information
- Coordinates: 29.7151°N 71.4764°E
- Owner: Ministry of Railways
- Line: Karachi–Peshawar Railway Line

Other information
- Station code: GLW

Services
Preceding station	Pakistan Railways	Following station
Shah Nal towards Kiamari	Karachi–Peshawar Line	Zarif Shaheed towards Peshawar Cantonment
Location

Gilawala Railway Station (Urdu and Punjabi: گیلے والہ ریلوے اسٹیشن) is located in Gilawala village, Lodhran district of Punjab province of the Pakistan.

== See also ==
- List of railway stations in Pakistan
- Pakistan Railways
