= Haibat Shaheed railway station =

Railway station in Pakistan

Haibat Shaheed Station ہیبت شھید ریلوے اسٹیشن هيبت شهید ریلوي اسٽيشن

General information
- Coordinates: 28.2797°N 69.0033°E
- Owner: Ministry of Railways
- Line: Kotri–Attock Railway Line

Other information
- Station code: HTS

Services
Preceding station	Pakistan Railways	Following station
Dilmurad towards Kotri Junction	Kotri–Attock Line	Kandkot towards Attock City Junction
Location

Haibat Shaheed Railway Station (Urdu: ہیبت شھید ریلوے اسٹیشن, Sindhi: ھیبت شاھد ریلوي اسٽیشن) is located in Pakistan.

== See also ==
- List of railway stations in Pakistan
- Pakistan Railways
