= Kot Sultan railway station =

Railway station in Punjab, Pakistan

Kot Sultan Railway Station کوٹ سلطان ریلوے اسٹیشن

General information
- Coordinates: 30.7645°N 70.9351°E
- Owner: Ministry of Railways
- Line: Kotri–Attock Railway Line

Other information
- Station code: KTS

Services
Preceding station	Pakistan Railways	Following station
Ashanpur towards Kotri Junction	Kotri–Attock Line	Jaman Shah towards Attock City Junction
Location

Kot Sultan Railway Station (Urdu: کوٹ سلطان ریلوے اسٹیشن) is located in Kot Sultan, a town in Layyah District of Punjab, Pakistan.

== See also ==
- List of railway stations in Pakistan
- Pakistan Railways
