= Jamshoro railway station =

Railway station in Pakistan

Jamshoro Station جامشورو ریلوے اسٹیشن ڄامشورو ريلوي اسٽيشن

General information
- Coordinates: 25.7248°N 68.1627°E
- Owner: Ministry of Railways
- Line: Kotri–Attock Railway Line

Other information
- Station code: JAM

Services
Preceding station	Pakistan Railways	Following station
Kotri Junction Terminus	Kotri–Attock Line	Sind University towards Attock City Junction
Location

Jamshoro railway station (Urdu: جامشورو ریلوے اسٹیشن, Sindhi: ڄامشورو ريلوي اسٽيشن) is located in Jamshoro, Sindh, Pakistan.

== See also ==
- List of railway stations in Pakistan
- Pakistan Railways
