= Sanawan railway station =

Railway station in Punjab, Pakistan

Sanawan Railway Station سناواں ریلوے اسٹیشن
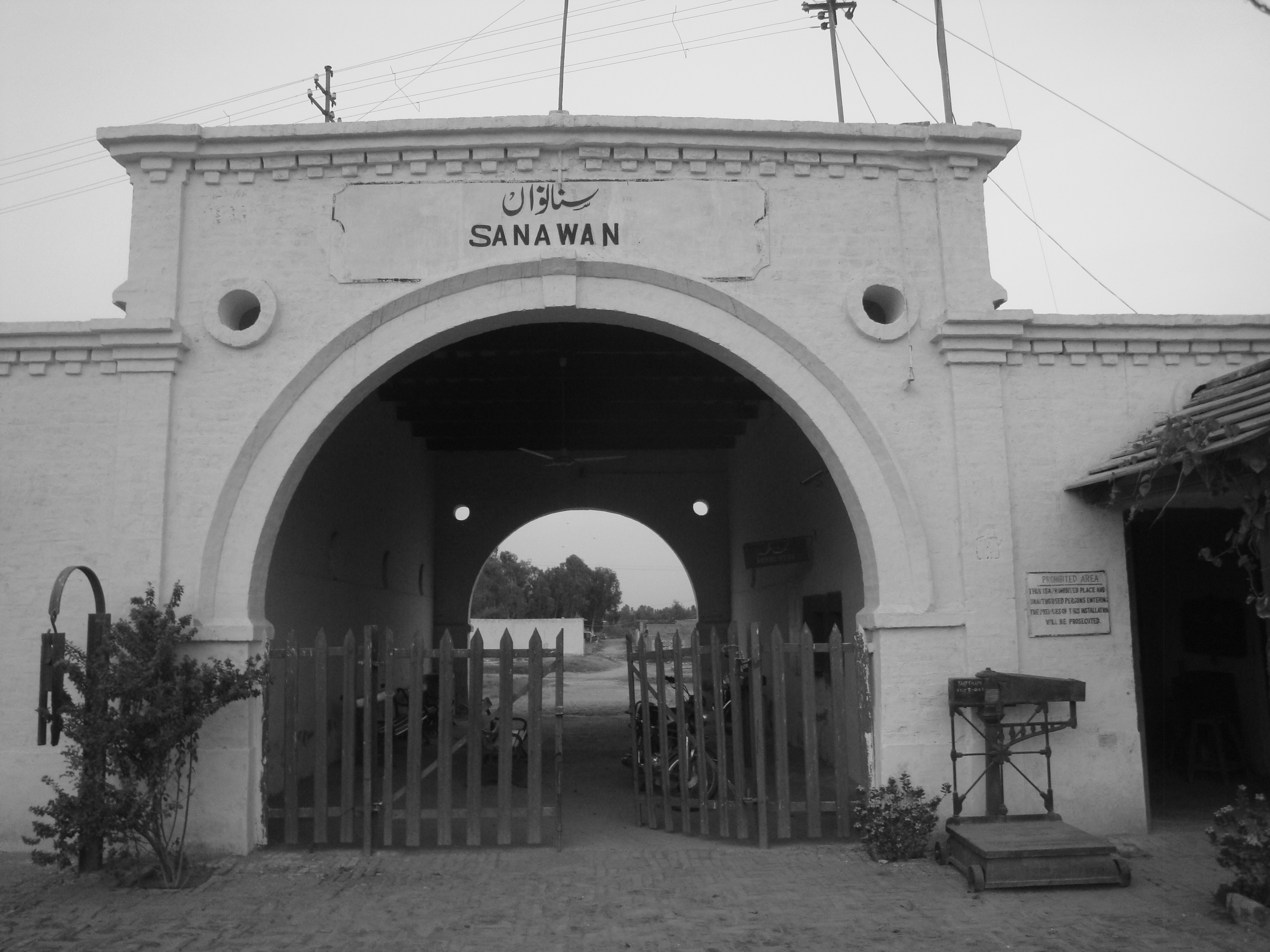
- Sanawan Railway Station entrance

General information
- Coordinates: 30.3344°N 70.9695°E
- Owner: Ministry of Railways
- Line: Sher Shah–Kot Addu Branch Line

Other information
- Station code: SNW

Services
| Preceding station | Pakistan Railways | Following station |
|---|---|---|
| Gurmani towards Sher Shah Junction | Sher Shah–Kot Addu Branch Line | Kot Adu Junction Terminus |
Location

Sanawan Railway Station (Urdu: سناواں ریلوے اسٹیشن, Punjabi: سناواں ریلوے اسٹیشن) is located in town of Sanawan in Kot Addu District of Punjab, Pakistan.

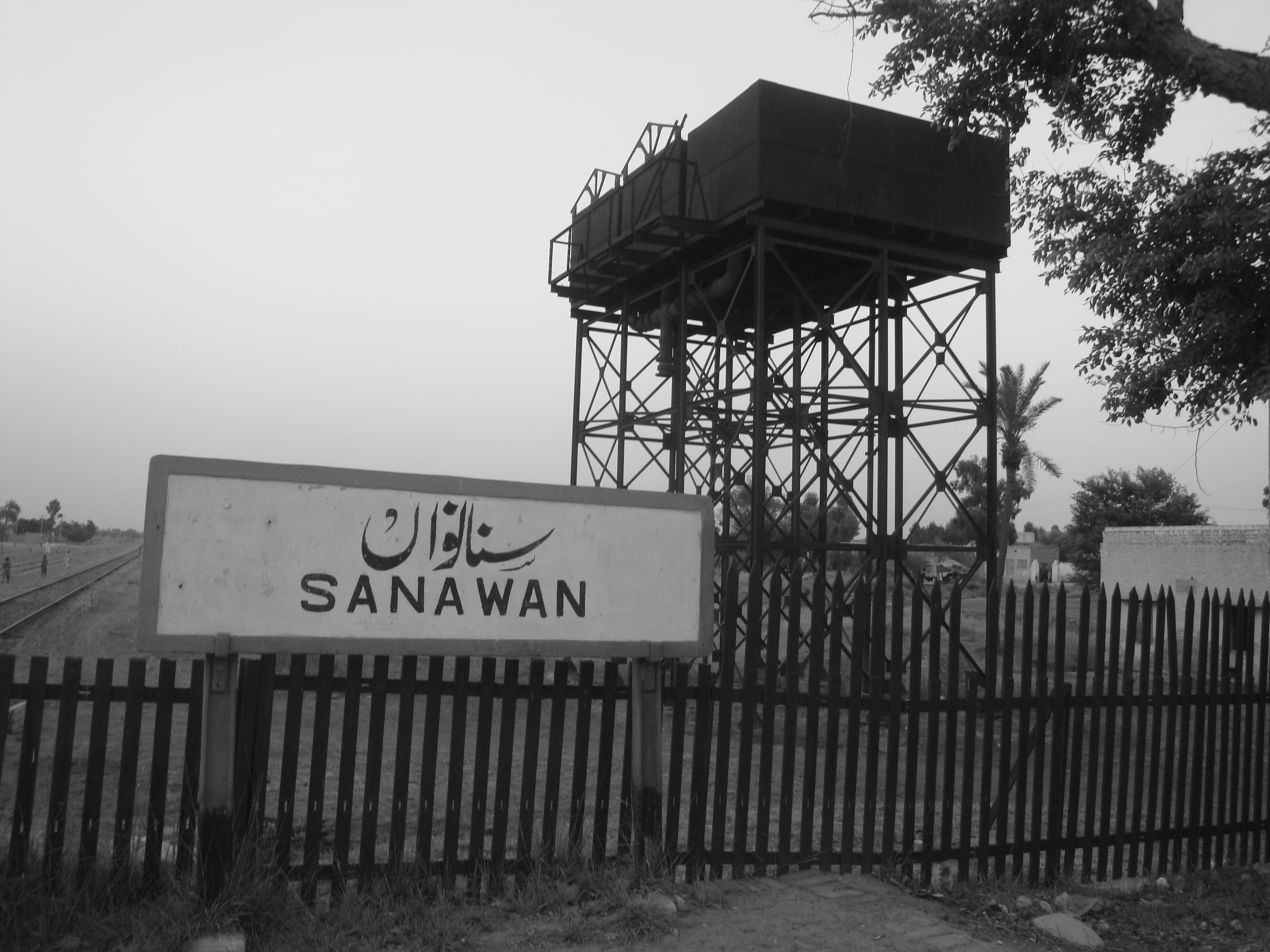
Sanawan Railway Station

== See also ==
- List of railway stations in Pakistan
- Pakistan Railways
