= Jamia Sakeena-Tul-Sughra =

Mosque in Punjab, Pakistan

- جامعہ مسجد سکینہ تلصغریٰ
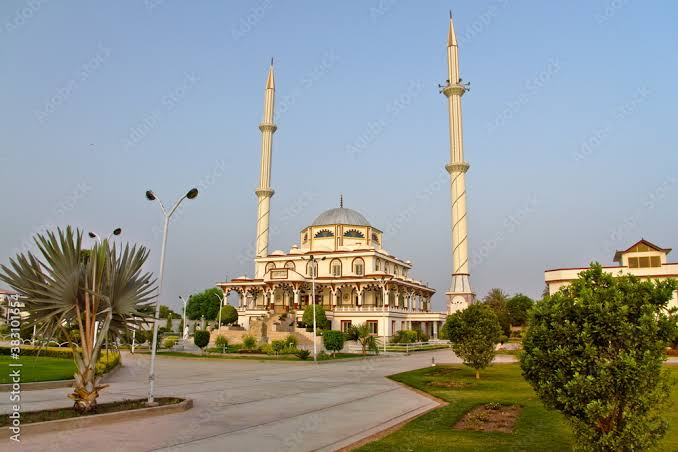

- Location within Pakistan

Religion
- Affiliation: Islam
- Ecclesiastical or organizational status: Mosque
- Status: Active

Location
- Location: Jatoi Tehsil, District Muzaffargarh, Punjab
- Country: Pakistan
- Interactive map of Jamia Sakeena-Tul-Sughra
- Coordinates: 29°35′13″N 70°52′33.9″E

Architecture
- Type: Mosque architecture
- Style: Islamic architecture
- Completed: 2007

Specifications
- Minaret: Two
- Minaret height: 55 m (180 ft)

Jamia Sakina-Tul-Sughra Mosque (جامعہ مسجد سکینہ تلصغریٰ) is a mosque in Jatoi Tehsil, District Muzaffargarh, Punjab, Pakistan. The mosque lies in a settlement known as Kotla Rehm Ali Shah, named after Syed Rehm Ali Shah who constructed a mosque at the same place about 200 years ago. Masjid Sakina-Tul-Sughra was founded by Syed Ismail Ahmed Hussain Bokhari, a US-based interventional cardiologist.

The Jamia is composed of a mosque and school and serves as a community center where services are provided to the neighboring villages and free meals are given daily to anyone in the community.

Jamia Sakeena-Tul-Sughra is situated 10 kilometres (6.2 mi) from Jatoi city on Jatoi-Shah Jamal Road in Kotla Rehm Ali Shah, District Muzaffargarh.

== Design ==
The mosque is designed by Turkish architecture specialist. The construction of the mosque started on 31 January 2006 and took one and a half year to complete. Having two minarets with each of 55 metres (180 ft) height, the total area of the mosque is 52 kanals. The first Aza'an (call to prayer) in the new mosque was recited on 27 September 2007.

== See also ==
- Bhong Mosque
