= Jacobabad Junction railway station =

Railway station in Pakistan

Jacobabad Junction جیکب آباد اسٹیشن جيڪب آباد اسٽيشن
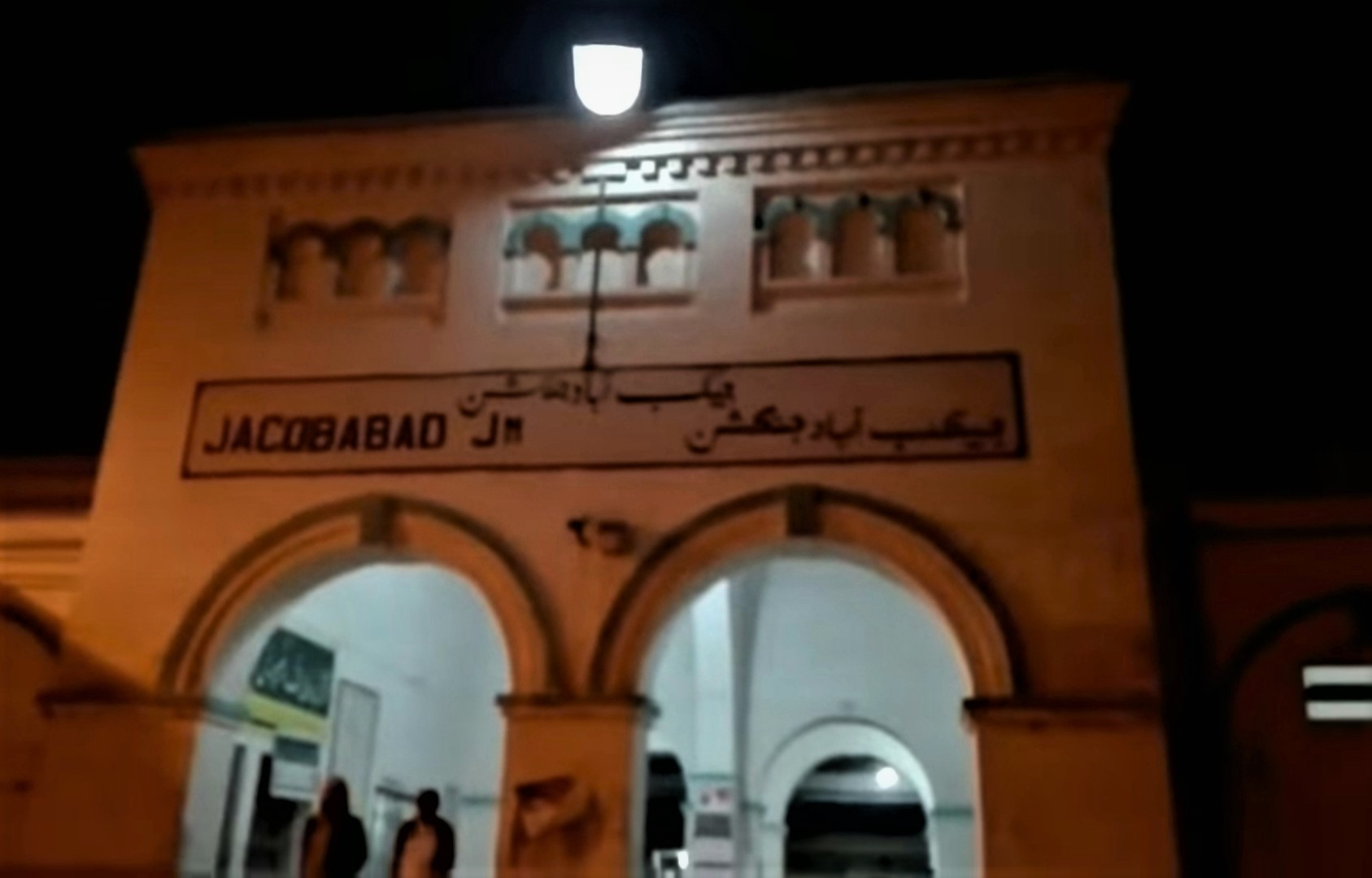

General information
- Coordinates: 28.2762°N 68.4328°E
- Owner: Ministry of Railways
- Lines: Rohri-Chaman Railway Line; Kotri–Attock Railway Line; Larkana–Jacobabad Light Railway

Other information
- Station code: JCD

History
- Opened: 1886

Services
Preceding station	Pakistan Railways	Following station
Abad towards Rohri Junction	Rohri–Chaman Line	Dera Allah Yar towards Chaman
Abad towards Kotri Junction	Kotri–Attock Line	Dilmurad towards Attock City Junction
Usta Muhammad towards Larkana Junction	Larkana–Jacobabad Light Railway	Terminus
Location
- Location within Sindh Location within Pakistan

Jacobabad Junction Railway Station (Urdu: جیکب آباد جنکشن ریلوے اسٹیشن, Sindhi: جیڪب آباد جنڪشن ریلوي اسٽیشن) is located in Jacobabad, Sindh, Pakistan. Jacobabad serves as a major junction for Pakistan Railways network with tracks branching off to Kot Addu (via Dera Ghazi Khan). The station is staffed and has a booking office.

== History ==
It was built in 1886 and in 1906, it was converted into a junction.

== Train routes ==
The routes are Jacobabad from linked with Lahore, Karachi, Peshawar, Rawalpindi, Quetta, Multan, Sahiwal, Hyderabad, Rohri, Sukkur, Bahawalpur, Dera Ghazi Khan, Kot Adu, Gujrat, Larkana, Gujranwala, Khanewal, Nawabshah, Attock, Dadu, and Nowshera.

== Train services from Jacobabad ==
Train Name	Stations
Bolan Mail	Quetta, Kolpur, Machh, Sibi, Jacobabad, Shikarpur, Larkana, Dadu, Kotri, Landhi, Karachi
Jaffar Express	Quetta, Kolpur, Machh, Sibi, Jacobabad, Sukkur, Rohri, Ghotki, Sadiqabad, Bahawalpur, Multan, Khanewal, Okara, Kot Lakhpat, Lahore, Gujranwala, Wazirabad, Gujrat, Jhelum, Lala Musa, Rawalpindi, Peshawar
Khushhal Khan Khattak Express	Karachi, Dadu, Larkana, Jacobabad, Dera Ghazi Khan, Bhakkar, Mianwali, Attock, Nowshera, Peshawar
Sukkur Express	Jacobabad, Shikarpur, Sukkur, Rohri, Pad Idan, Nawabshah, Tando Adam, Hyderabad, Karachi
Quetta Express	Quetta, Kolpur, Sibi, Jacobabad, Sukkur, Rohri Bahawalpur, Khanewal, Toba Tek Singh, Faisalabad, Sangla Hill, Lahore

== See also ==
- Pakistan Railways
- Jacobabad
- Jacobabad Tehsil
- Jacobabad District
