= Jaman Shah railway station =

Railway station in Pakistan

Jaman Shah Railway Station جمن شاہ ریلوے اسٹیشن

General information
- Coordinates: 30.8711°N 70.9419°E
- Owner: Ministry of Railways
- Line: Kotri–Attock Railway Line

Other information
- Station code: JNS

Services
Preceding station	Pakistan Railways	Following station
Kot Sultan towards Kotri Junction	Kotri–Attock Line	Layyah towards Attock City Junction
Location

Jaman Shah Railway Station (Urdu: جمن شاہ ریلوے اسٹیشن) is located in Pakistan.

== See also ==
- List of railway stations in Pakistan
- Pakistan Railways
