= Laki Marwat Junction railway station =

Railway station in Pakistan

Lakki Marwat Junction Station لکی مروت جنکشن اسٹیشن

General information
- Coordinates: 32.6010°N 70.9237°E
- Owner: Ministry of Railways
- Lines: Daud Khel–Lakki Marwat Branch Line; Bannu–Tank Branch Line

Other information
- Station code: LMW

History
- Opened: 1913
- Closed: 1995

Services
| Preceding station | Pakistan Railways | Following station |
|---|---|---|
| Isa Khel towards Daud Khel Junction | Daud Khel–Lakki Marwat Branch Line | Terminus |
| Naurang Serai Sugar Mill Siding towards Bannu | Bannu–Tank Branch Line | Shahbaz Khel Halt towards Tank Junction |
Location

Laki Marwat Junction railway station (Urdu: لکی مروت جنکشن ریلوے اسٹیشن) is a former station in Lakki Marwat, Khyber Pakhtunkhwa, Pakistan.

It was closed in 1995.

== See also ==
- List of railway stations in Pakistan
- Pakistan Railways
