= Mithan Kot railway station =

Railway station in Punjab, Pakistan

Mithan Kot Railway Station مٹھن کوٹ ریلوے اسٹیشن

General information
- Owner: Ministry of Railways
- Line: Kotri–Attock Railway Line

Other information
- Station code: KMTN

Services
Preceding station	Pakistan Railways	Following station
Kashmor Junction towards Kotri Junction	Kotri–Attock Line	Rajanpur towards Attock City Junction
Location

Mithan Kot Railway Station (Urdu: مٹھن کوٹ ریلوے اسٹیشن) is located in city of Mithankot in Rajanpur District, Punjab, Pakistan.

== See also ==
- List of railway stations in Pakistan
- Pakistan Railways
