= Jatoi Tehsil =

Jatoi Tehsil تحصِيل جتوئی
- Tehsil
- Country: Pakistan
- province: (Punjab, Pakistan) Punjab
- District: Muzaffargarh
- City: Jatoi
- Towns: 1
- Union councils: 16

Government
  - MNA: Syed Basit Sultan Bukhari
  - MPA: Dawood khan jatoi

Area
  - Tehsil: 1,010 km^{2} (390 sq mi)

Population (2023)
  - Tehsil: 862,046
  - Urban: 217,380 (25.22%)
  - Rural: 644,666 (74.78%)

Literacy (2023)
  - Literacy rate: 40.67%
- Time zone: UTC+5 (PST)
  - Summer (DST): UTC+6 (PDT)
- Postal code: 34430
- Area code: 0662

Jatoi (Urdu: تحصِيل جتوئی) is a tehsil, an administrative subdivision, of Muzaffargarh District in Punjab, Pakistan. Its capital is Jatoi, and it is situated in the southern part of the Punjab province. The estimated population of Jatoi is 714,576.

Tehsil Jatoi is known for the Jamia Sakeena-Tul-Sughra mosque, and its Turkish-style construction. The common attire worn by the people in Jatoi Tehsil is the Shalwar kameez. Primarily a rural area, agriculture is the main occupation for most residents. Jatoi is particularly famous for its high-quality cotton and canal system.

== Demographics ==
=== Population ===
Historical population
Year	Pop.	±% p.a.
1951	95,808	—
1961	109,675	+1.36%
1972	162,051	+3.61%
1981	241,975	+4.56%
1998	446,546	+3.67%
2017	715,177	+2.51%
2023	862,046	+3.16%

As of the 2023 census, Jatoi tehsil has population of 862,046. Out of which, Urban population is 217380 which is nearly 25.22% and rural population is 644,666.

As of the 2023 census, Jatoi Tehsil has a total literacy rate of 40.67%, with male literacy at 48.85% and female literacy at 32.19%.
