= Daira Din Panah Railway Station =

Railway station in Pakistan

Daira Din Panah Station دائرہ دین پناہ ریلوے اسٹیشن

General information
- Coordinates: 30.5679°N 70.9434°E
- Owner: Ministry of Railways
- Line: Kotri–Attock Railway Line

Other information
- Station code: DNP

Services
Preceding station	Pakistan Railways	Following station
Kot Adu Junction towards Kotri Junction	Kotri–Attock Line	Ashanpur towards Attock City Junction
Location

Daira Din Panah Railway Station (Urdu: دائرہ دین پناہ ریلوے اسٹیشن, Punjabi: دائرہ دین پناہ ریلوے اسٹیشن) is located in Pakistan.

== See also ==
- List of railway stations in Pakistan
- Pakistan Railways
