= Rajanpur railway station =

Railway station in Punjab, Pakistan

Rajanpur Railway Station راجن پور ریلوے اسٹیشن
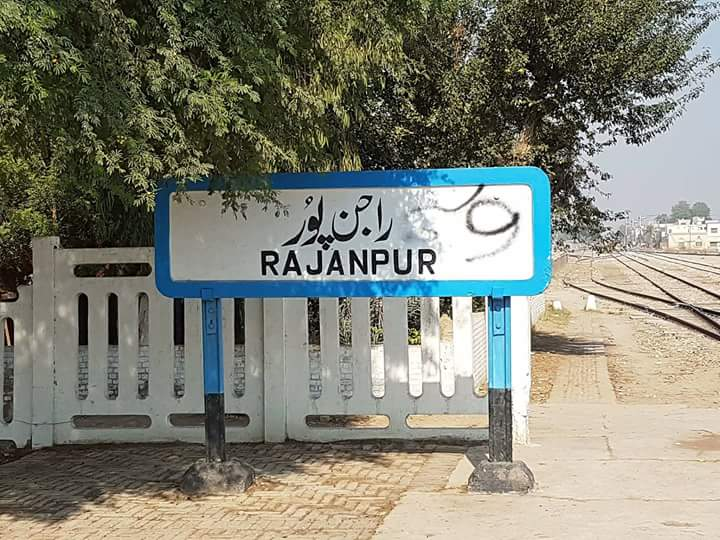

General information
- Coordinates: 29.1001°N 70.3377°E
- Owner: Ministry of Railways
- Line: Kotri–Attock Railway Line

Other information
- Station code: RJPR

Services
Preceding station	Pakistan Railways	Following station
Mithan Kot towards Kotri Junction	Kotri–Attock Line	Badli Mazari towards Attock City Junction
Location

Rajanpur Railway Station (Urdu: راجن پور ریلوے اسٹیشن, Punjabi: راجن پور ریلوے اسٹیشن) is located in Rajanpur, Punjab, Pakistan.

== Gallery ==
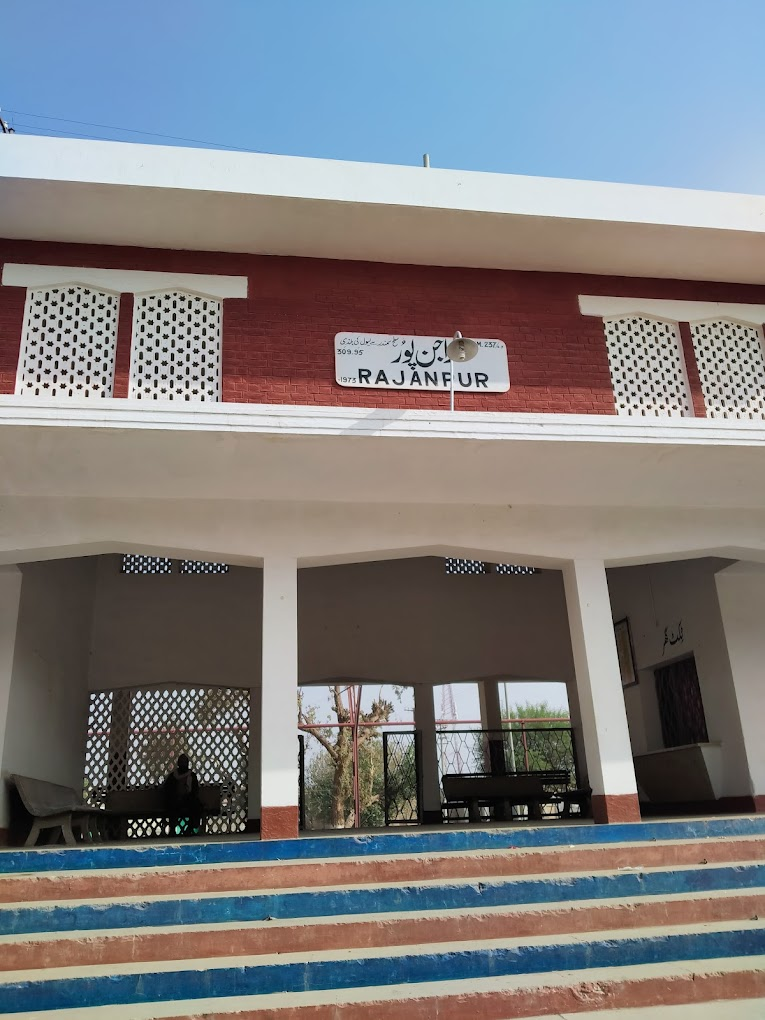

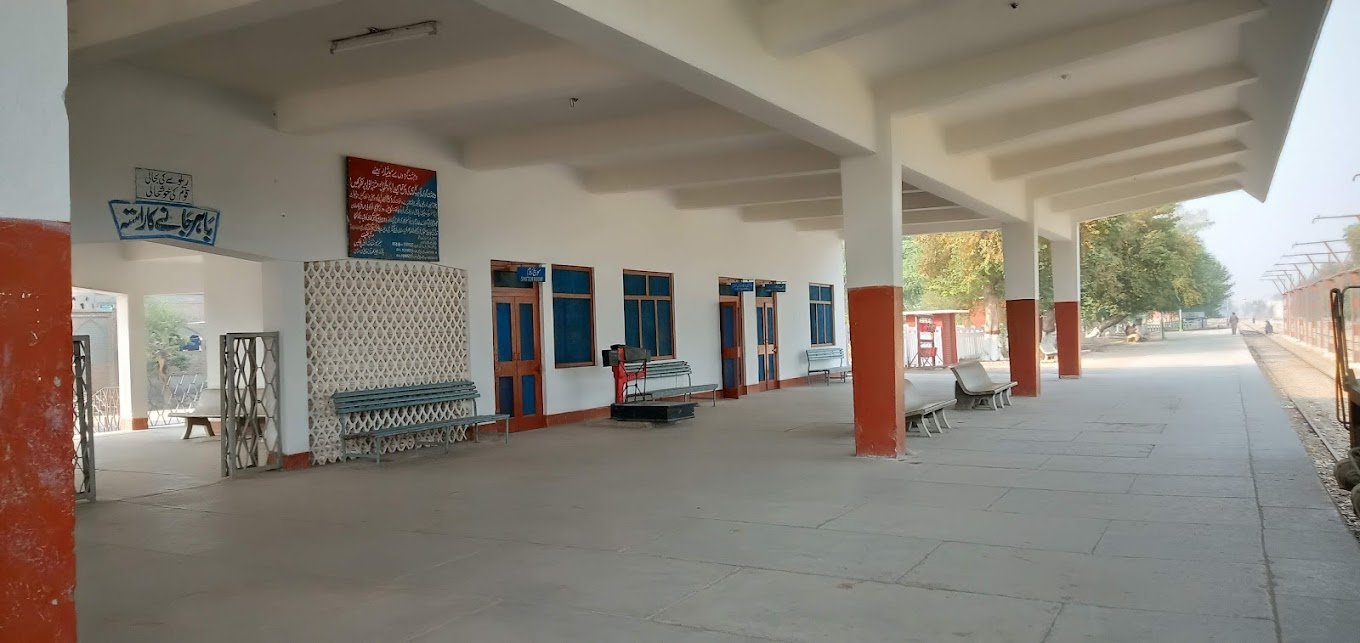

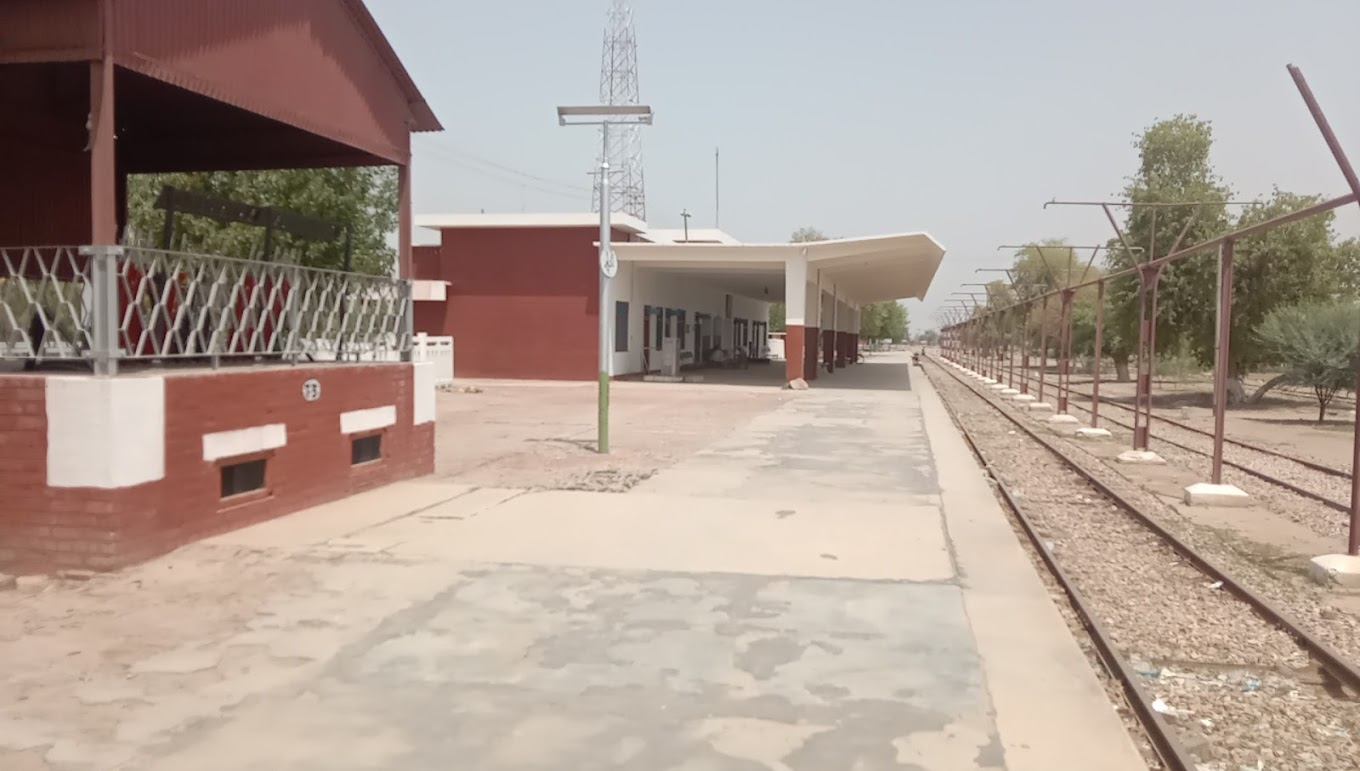

== See also ==
- List of railway stations in Pakistan
- Pakistan Railways
