= Pai Khel railway station =

Railway station in Pakistan

Pai Khel Railway Station پائی خیل ریلوے اسٹیشن

General information
- Coordinates: 32.7647°N 71.5747°E
- Owner: Ministry of Railways
- Line: Kotri–Attock Railway Line

Other information
- Station code: PIK

Services
Preceding station	Pakistan Railways	Following station
Mianwali towards Kotri Junction	Kotri–Attock Line	Daud Khel Junction towards Attock City Junction
Location

Pai Khel Railway Station (Urdu: پائی خیل ریلوے اسٹیشن) is a railway station located in Pakistan. Construction of it completed in 1890 and it inaugurated on March 18, 1892.

== See also ==
- List of railway stations in Pakistan
- Pakistan Railways
