= Ahsanpur railway station =

Railway station in Pakistan

Ahsanpur Railway Station احسان پور ریلوے اسٹیشن

General information
- Coordinates: 30.6489°N 70.9514°E
- Owner: Ministry of Railways
- Line: Kotri–Attock Railway Line

Other information
- Station code: AHP

Services
Preceding station	Pakistan Railways	Following station
Dera Dinpanah towards Kotri Junction	Kotri–Attock Line	Kot Sultan towards Attock City Junction
Location
- Location within Punjab, Pakistan Location within Pakistan

Ahsanpur Railway Station (Urdu: احسان پور ریلوے اسٹیشن) is located in Kot Addu District in Punjab province of Pakistan.

== See also ==
- List of railway stations in Pakistan
- Pakistan Railways
