= Jatoi, Muzaffargarh =

City in Punjab, Pakistan

Jatoi جتوئی
- City
- Jatoi
- Location within Punjab, Pakistan Location within Pakistan
- Coordinates: 29°30′24.2″N 70°50′47.1″E
- Country: Pakistan
- Province: Punjab
- Division: Dera Ghazi Khan
- District: Muzaffargarh

Government
  - Type: Municipal Committee
  - Administrator: Sajid Iqbal
  - Chief officer: Vacant

Population (2023)
  - City: 155,196
  - Rank: 74th, Pakistan
- Time zone: UTC+5 (PST)
- Calling code: 066

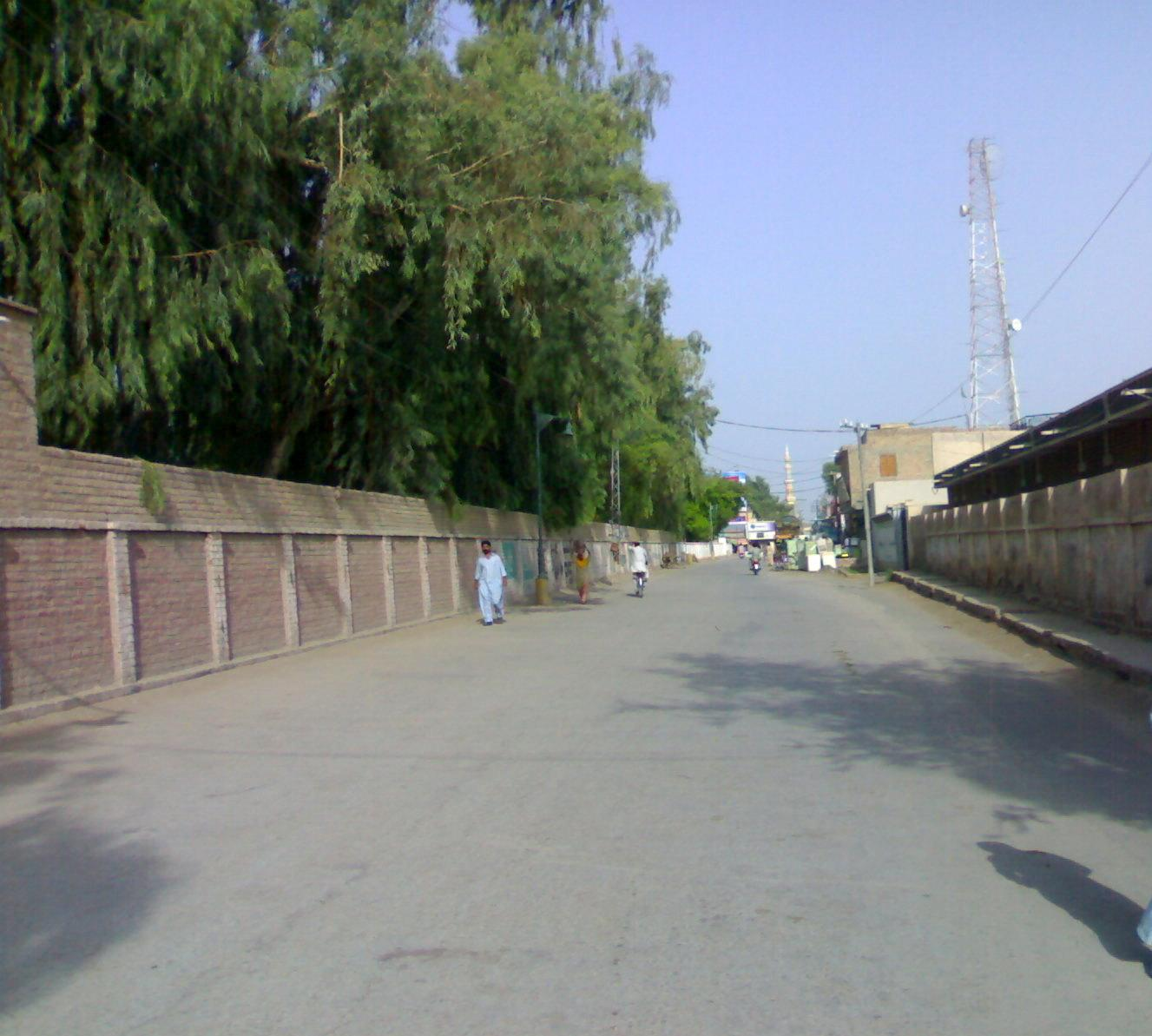
Street view in Jatoi

Jatoi (Urdu: جتوئی) is the capital city of Jatoi Tehsil (an administrative subdivision), in Muzaffargarh district, Punjab province, Pakistan. It is the 74th most populous city of Pakistan.

The city has several schools such as Govt. Boys Degree College & high schools for boys & girls. The Govt. Girls Degree College was built in 2013. It also has a large number of private institutions. There is Sardar Kaure Khan Jatoi park and library that will be built soon by Kauray Khan trust in the name of Sardar Kaure Khan Jatoi. Jatoi is an agricultural city, with very fertile soil and water provided by a canal system and tube wells, producing two or three crops in a year.

Major crops are cotton, wheat, sugarcane, rice, and sunflower. The major fruits are mango, dates and jamun. Politicians include Sardar Abdul Qayyum Jatoi, Syed Abdullah Shah Bukhari and their sons, and later ones including Khan Muhammad Khan, Sami Ullah khan Laghari, Syed Jameel Shah Bukhari, Syed Azhar Hussain Shah, Syed Mazhar Hussain Shah, Syed Shreef Hussain Shah, Rana Wakeel & Malik Abdul Rasheed (Bao Rasheed).

The city has a mosque, located in the Kotla Rehm Ali shah, a rural part of Jatoi Tehsil. The mosque is a symbol of spirituality for the people of Jatoi. The literacy rate is about 5%. The environment has been damaged by intensive felling of trees; but in 2012 more than 1000 trees were planted. About 10 KM away from Jatoi City, lies the famous Mosque Jamia Sakeena-Tul-Sughra.

== Demographics ==
Population

Historical population
Year	Pop.	±% p.a.
1951	4,744	—
1961	5,384	+1.27%
1972	8,068	+3.75%
1981	21,422	+11.46%
1998	38,986	+3.59%
2017	109,424	+5.58%
2023	155,196	+6.00%

According to 2023 census, Jatoi had a population of 155,196.

Languages

Languages of Jatoi MC (2023 Census)
1. Saraiki (92.6%)
2. Urdu (6.40%)
3. Punjabi (0.80%)
4. Others (0.20%)

== Urbanization plan ==
In 2021, The government of Punjab decided to urbanize 154 small cities and towns surrounding Punjab. The plan was formulated in result of sharp increase in migration of people from these small towns to larger cities.

The five major cities — Lahore, Gujranwala, Faisalabad, Rawalpindi and Multan—were not included in the list as they already had master plans for their land use and zoning for residential, commercial, agriculture, and industrial activities.

== 2022 Flooding ==
In August 2022, the city was struck by Major flooding, causing massive destruction in the city. Thousands of people were affected by the flood and lost their homes, which resulted in suffering of diseases and starvation.

Government officials visited the flood affected areas and formulated plans to conduct aiding and rescue operations. Chief Minister of Sindh, Murad Ali shah announced the allocation of budget particularly for re-construction of roads damaged by the overflow. Those roads play important role in the economy as they connect the villages to the markets for easy access.

== Sports clubs of Jatoi ==
Mcc Tigers cricket club (REG) is well known sports club of Jatoi. White Flower Cricket Club (REG) is the oldest And well Known Sports Club Of Jatoi.

Reference by Adnan Farid Laskani
