= Fayyaz Park =

Public Park

- فیاض پارک
- Interactive map of Fayyaz Park
- Location: Muzaffargarh
- Coordinates: 30°04′25.14″N 71°11′30.5″E
- Status: Open / Active
- Parking: Yes

Fayyaz Park is a recreational public park in Muzaffargarh, Pakistan. The park is named after Fayyaz Bashir, a former Deputy Commissioner of Muzaffargarh. Previously the site of the current park was the location of the Deputy Commissioner's residence. This park is operated by District Government of city. This park hosts a spring festival every year.
