= Lal Mir Halt railway station =

Railway station in Pakistan

General information
- Owner: Ministry of Railways

Other information
- Station code: LM

History
- Former names: Great Indian Peninsula Railway

Lal Mir Halt railway station (Urdu: لال میر ہالٹ ریلوے اسٹیشن) is located in Pakistan.

== See also ==
- List of railway stations in Pakistan
- Pakistan Railways
