= Kandkot railway station =

Railway station in Sindh, Pakistan

Kandkot Railway Station کندھ کوٹ ریلوے اسٹیشن ڪنڌڪوٽ اسٽيشن

General information
- Coordinates: 28.2516°N 69.1854°E
- Owner: Ministry of Railways
- Line: Kotri–Attock Railway Line

Other information
- Station code: KFZ

Services
Preceding station	Pakistan Railways	Following station
Haibat Shahid towards Kotri Junction	Kotri–Attock Line	Bakhshapur towards Attock City Junction
Location

Kandkot Railway Station (Urdu: کندھ کوٹ ریلوے اسٹیشن, Sindhi: ڪنڌڪوٽ ريلوي اسٽيشن) is located in Kandhkot, Sindh, Pakistan.

== See also ==
- List of railway stations in Pakistan
- Pakistan Railways
- Ministry of Railways (Pakistan)
