= Kashmor Junction railway station =

Railway station in Sindh, Pakistan

Kashmor Junction Station کشمور جنکشن اسٹیشن ڪشمور جنڪشن ريلوي اسٽيشن

General information
- Coordinates: 28.4385°N 69.5836°E
- Owner: Ministry of Railways
- Line: Kotri–Attock Railway Line

Other information
- Station code: KZL

Services
Preceding station	Pakistan Railways	Following station
Bakhshapur towards Kotri Junction	Kotri–Attock Line	Mithan Kot towards Attock City Junction
Location

Kashmor Junction Railway Station (Urdu: کشمور جنکشن ریلوے اسٹیشن, Sindhi: ڪشمور جنڪشن ریلوي اسٽیشن) is located in Sindh, Pakistan.

== See also ==
- List of railway stations in Pakistan
- Pakistan Railways
