= Muzaffargarh railway station =

Railway station in Punjab, Pakistan

Muzaffargarh Station مظفرگڑھ ریلوے اسٹیشن
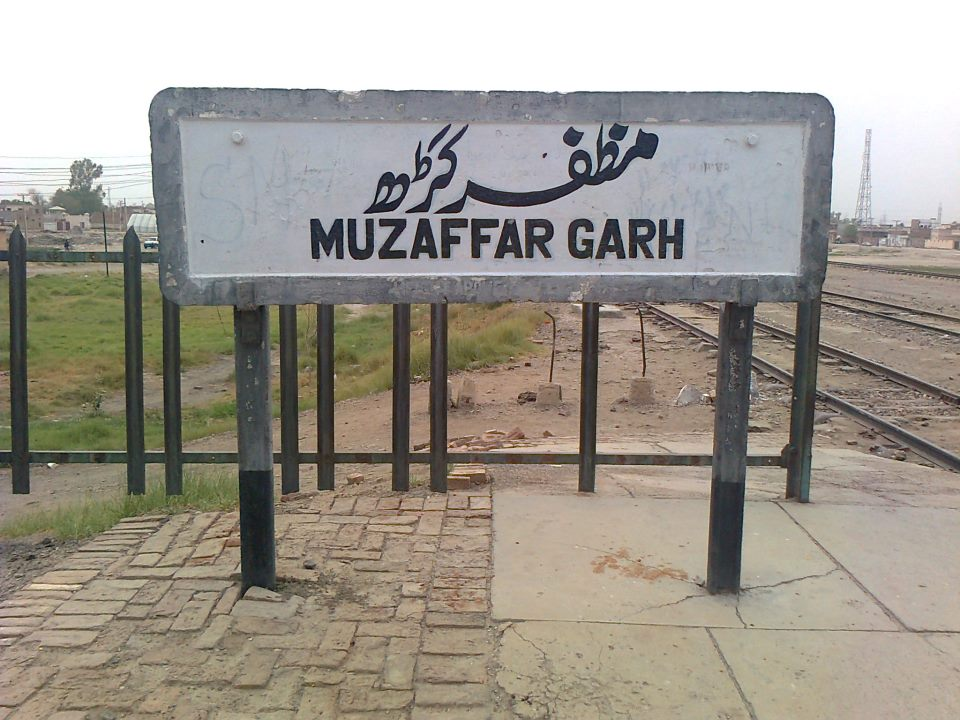
- Platform sign at Muzaffargarh station

General information
- Coordinates: 30.084°N 71.194°E
- System: Railway station
- Owner: Ministry of Railways
- Line: Sher Shah–Kot Addu Branch Line

Other information
- Station code: MZG

History
- Opened: 22 January 1887

Services
Preceding station	Pakistan Railways	Following station
Chenab West Bank towards Sher Shah Junction	Sher Shah–Kot Addu Branch Line	Budh towards Kot Adu Junction
Location

Muzaffargarh Railway Station (Urdu: مظفرگڑھ ریلوے اسٹیشن, Punjabi: مظفرگڑھ ریلوے اسٹیشن) is situated in Muzaffargarh, Pakistan. This railway station was constructed on January 22, 1887. Two trains pass from the station Mehr Express, its route is from Multan to Rawalpindi and Thall Express, as well as from Multan to Rawalpindi.

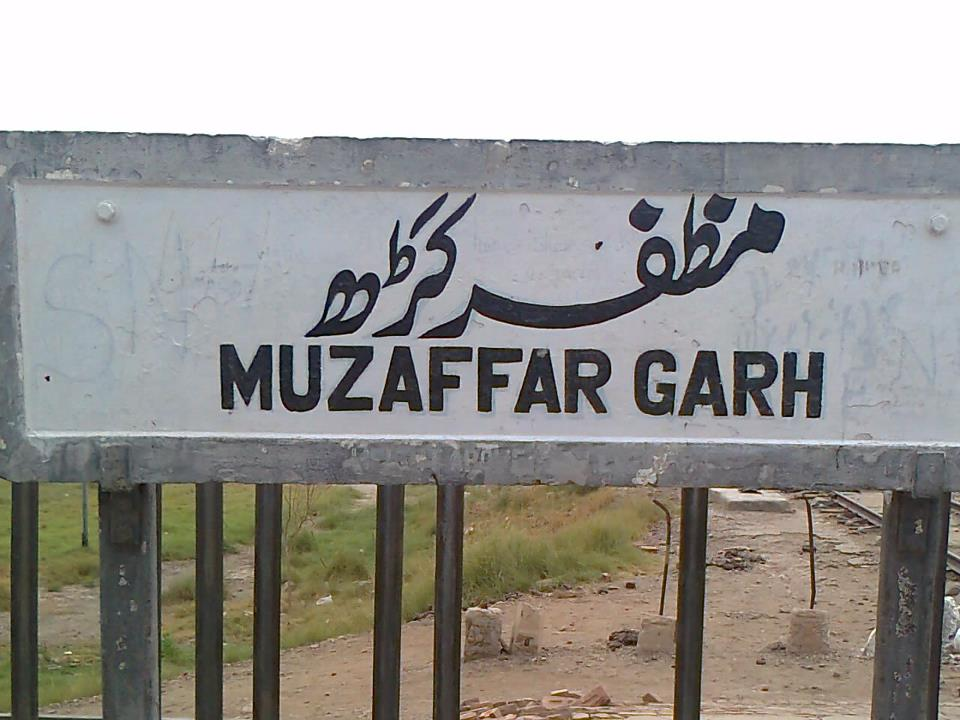

== See also ==
- List of railway stations in Muzaffargarh
- List of railway stations in Pakistan
- Pakistan Railways
