= Tank Junction railway station =

Railway station in Tank, Pakistan

Tank Junction Station ٹانک جنکشن ریلوے اسٹیشن
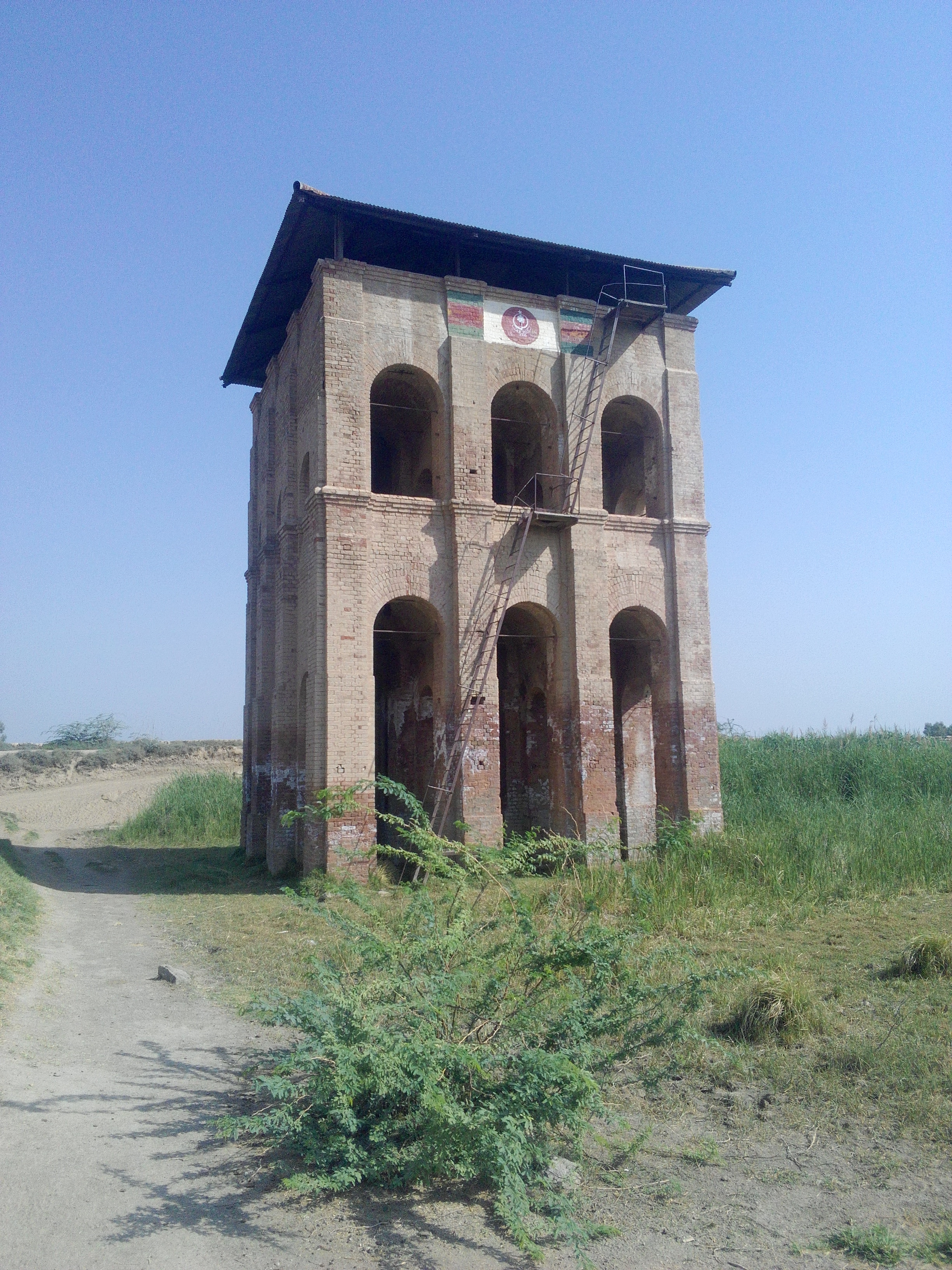
- Tank Railway station

General information
- Coordinates: 32°14′04″N 70°22′43″E
- Owner: Ministry of Railways
- Line: Bannu–Tank Branch Line

Other information
- Station code: TNC

Services
Preceding station	Pakistan Railways	Following station
Pezu towards Bannu	Bannu–Tank Branch Line	Terminus
Location

Tank Junction Railway Station (Urdu: ٹانک جنکشن ریلوے اسٹیشن) is an abandoned railway station located in Tank District, Pakistan.

== See also ==
- List of railway stations in Pakistan
- Pakistan Railways
