= Bannu railway station =

Railway station in Bannu, Pakistan

Bannu Railway Station بنوں ریلوے اسٹیشن

General information
- Owner: Ministry of Railways
- Line: Bannu–Tank Branch Line

Other information
- Station code: BXU

Services
Preceding station	Pakistan Railways	Following station
Terminus	Bannu–Tank Branch Line	Aba Khel towards Tank Junction

Bannu Railway Station (Urdu: بنوں ریلوے اسٹیشن) is an abandoned railway station located in Bannu, Pakistan.

== See also ==
- List of railway stations in Pakistan
- Pakistan Railways
