= Sher Shah Junction railway station =

Railway station in Punjab, Pakistan

Sher Shah Junction شیر شاہ جنکشن ریلوے اسٹیشن
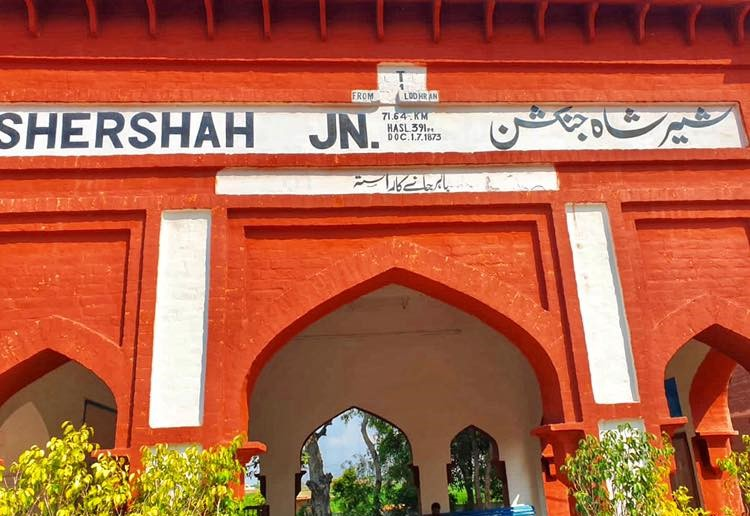

General information
- Location: Station Road, Sher Shah, Punjab 59200
- Coordinates: 30.0919°N 71.3426°E
- Owner: Ministry of Railways
- Lines: Karachi–Peshawar Railway Line; Sher Shah–Kot Addu Branch Line

Other information
- Station code: SSH

History
- Opened: 1 July 1873

Services
Preceding station	Pakistan Railways	Following station
Chak towards Kiamari	Karachi–Peshawar Line	Muzaffarabad towards Peshawar Cantonment
Terminus	Sher Shah–Kot Addu Branch Line	Chenab West Bank towards Kot Adu Junction
Location
- Location within Punjab, Pakistan Location within Pakistan

Sher Shah Junction Railway Station (Urdu and Punjabi: شیر شاہ جنکشن ریلوے اسٹیشن) is located in Sher Shah village, Multan district of Punjab province, Pakistan.

== See also ==
- List of railway stations in Pakistan
- Pakistan Railways
