= Daud Khel Junction railway station =

Railway station in Pakistan

Daud Khel Junction داود خیل ریلوے اسٹیشن
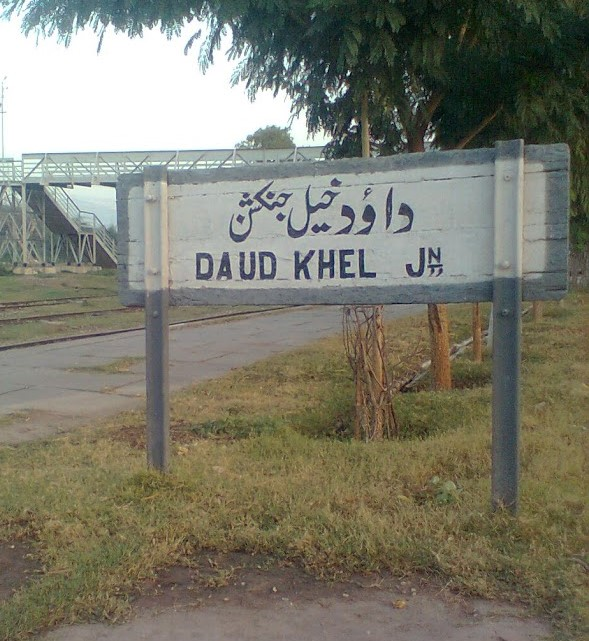

General information
- Coordinates: 32.8822°N 71.5820°E
- Owner: Ministry of Railways
- Lines: Kotri–Attock Railway Line; Daud Khel–Lakki Marwat Branch Line

Other information
- Station code: DKL

History
- Opened: 15 March 1892

Services
Preceding station	Pakistan Railways	Following station
Pai Khel towards Kotri Junction	Kotri–Attock Line	Massan towards Attock City Junction
Terminus	Daud Khel–Lakki Marwat Branch Line	Mari Indus towards Laki Marwat Junction
Location

Daud Khel Junction Railway Station (Urdu: داود خیل ریلوے اسٹیشن) is located in Mianwali district, in Punjab, Pakistan.

== Gallery ==
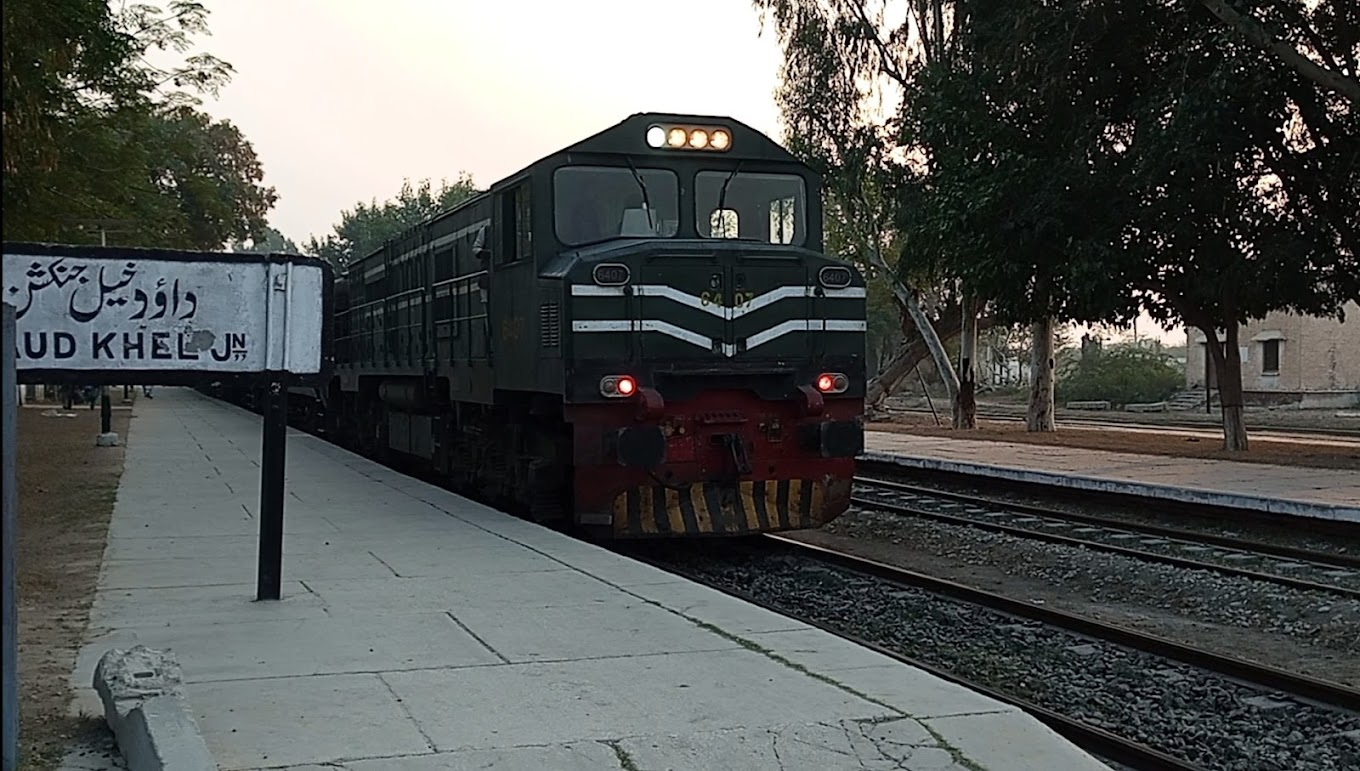

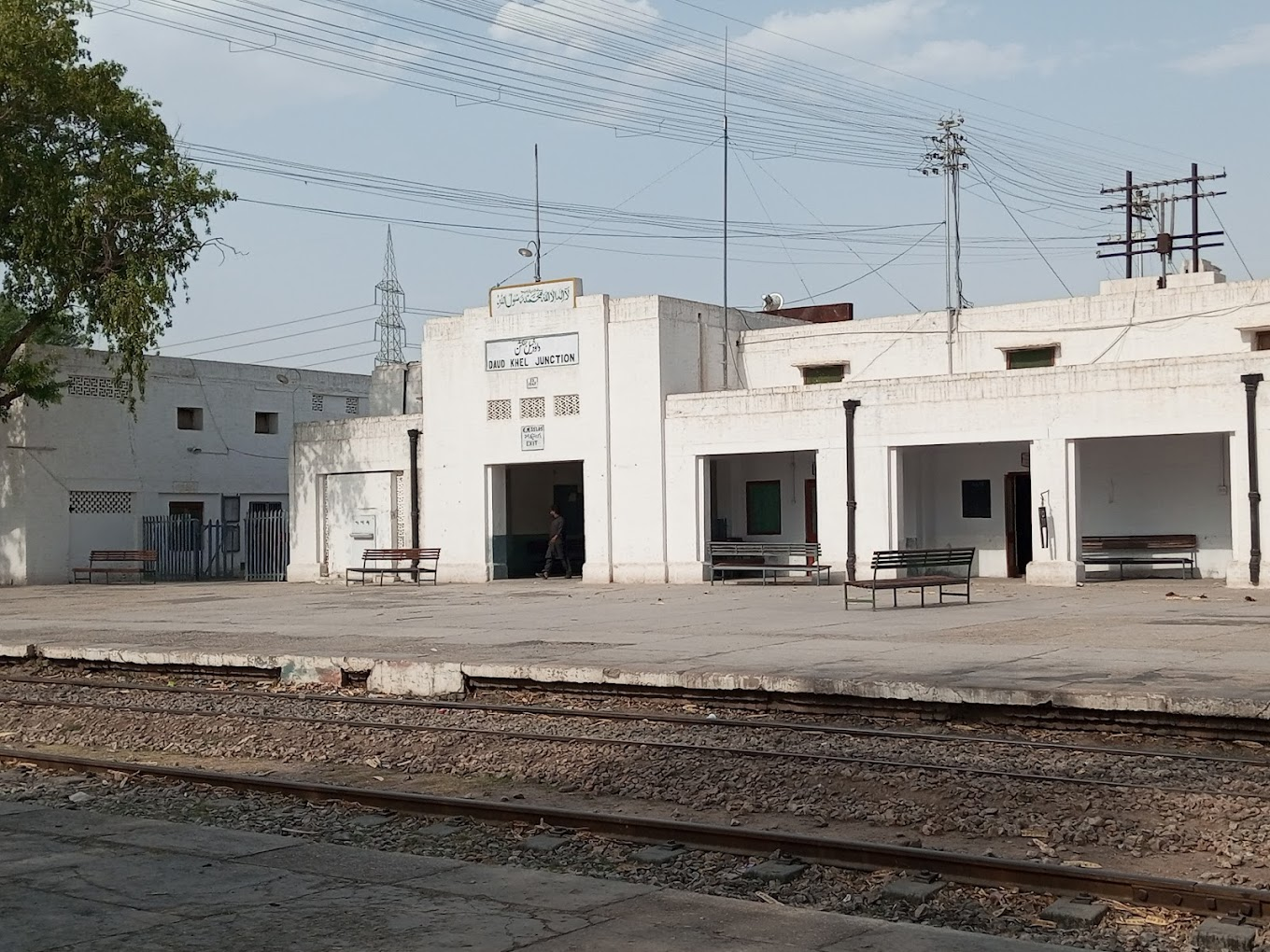

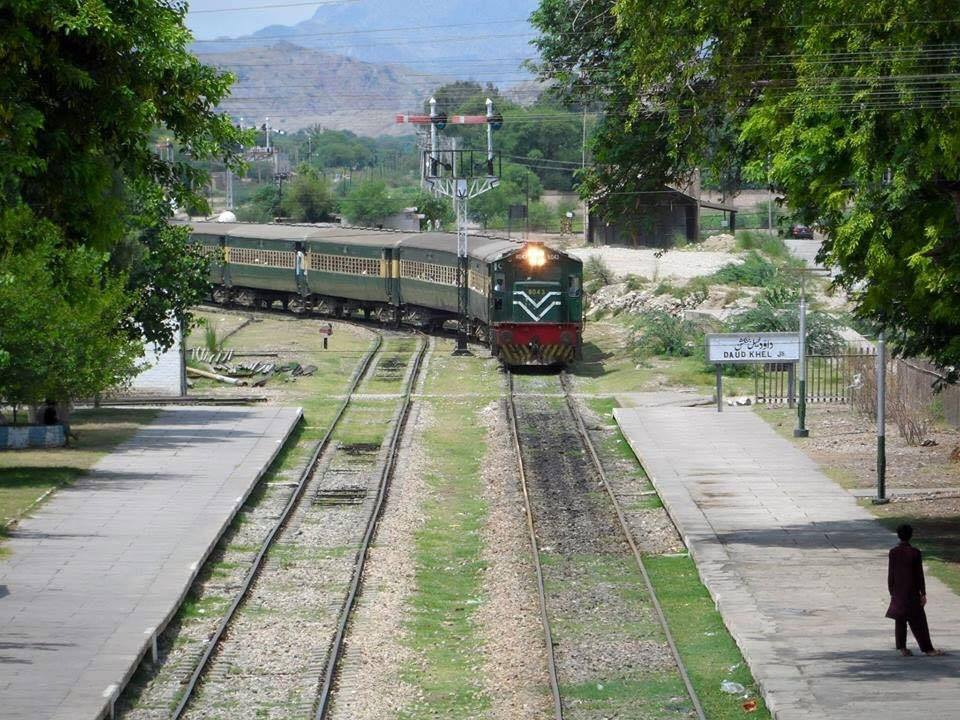

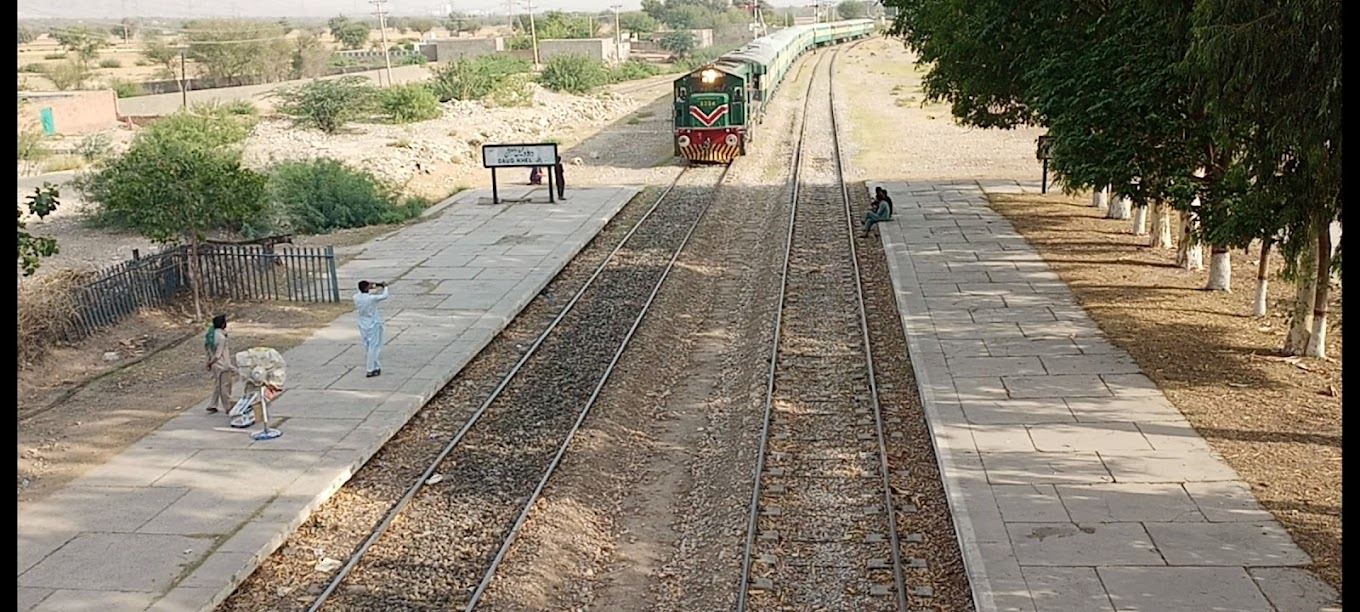

== See also ==
- List of railway stations in Pakistan
- Pakistan Railways
