= Kot Adu Junction railway station =

Railway station in Punjab, Pakistan

Kot Addu Junction Station کوٹ ادو جنکشن ریلوے اسٹیشن
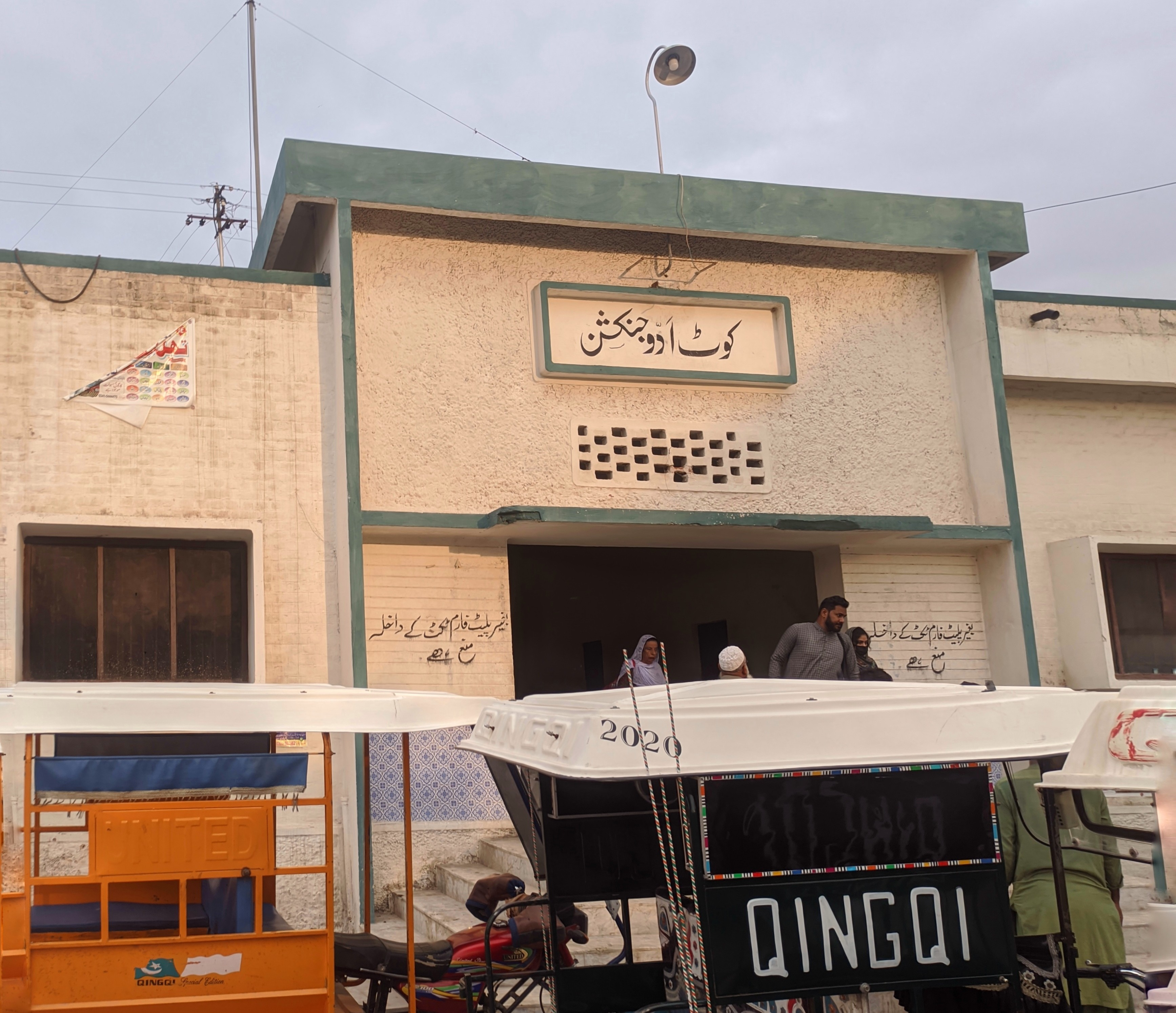

General information
- Coordinates: 30.4693°N 70.9625°E
- Owner: Ministry of Railways
- Lines: Kotri–Attock Railway Line; Sher Shah–Kot Addu Branch Line

Other information
- Station code: ADK

History
- Opened: 1887

Services
Preceding station	Pakistan Railways	Following station
Shadan Lund towards Kotri Junction	Kotri–Attock Line	Dera Dinpanah towards Attock City Junction
Sanawan towards Sher Shah Junction	Sher Shah–Kot Addu Branch Line	Terminus
Location

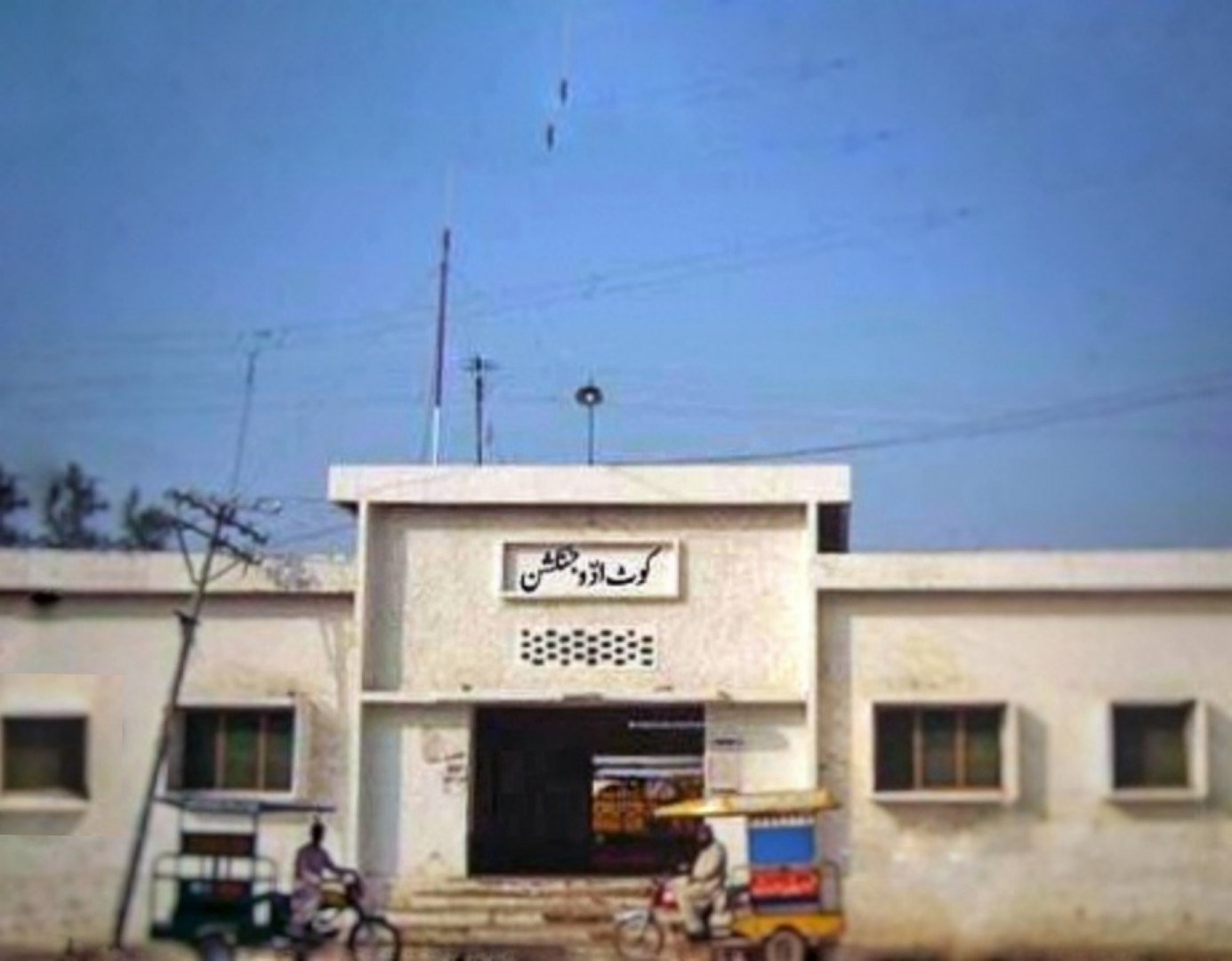
View of the station

Kot Adu Junction Railway Station (Urdu: کوٹ ادو جنکشن ریلوے اسٹیشن, Punjabi: کوٹ ادو جنکشن ریلوے اسٹیشن) is in Kot Addu, Kot Addu Tehsil, Kot Addu District Punjab, Pakistan.

== See also ==
- List of railway stations in Pakistan
- Pakistan Railways
