= Rawalpindi =

Metropolis in Punjab, Pakistan

Rawalpindi راولپنڈی
- Metropolis
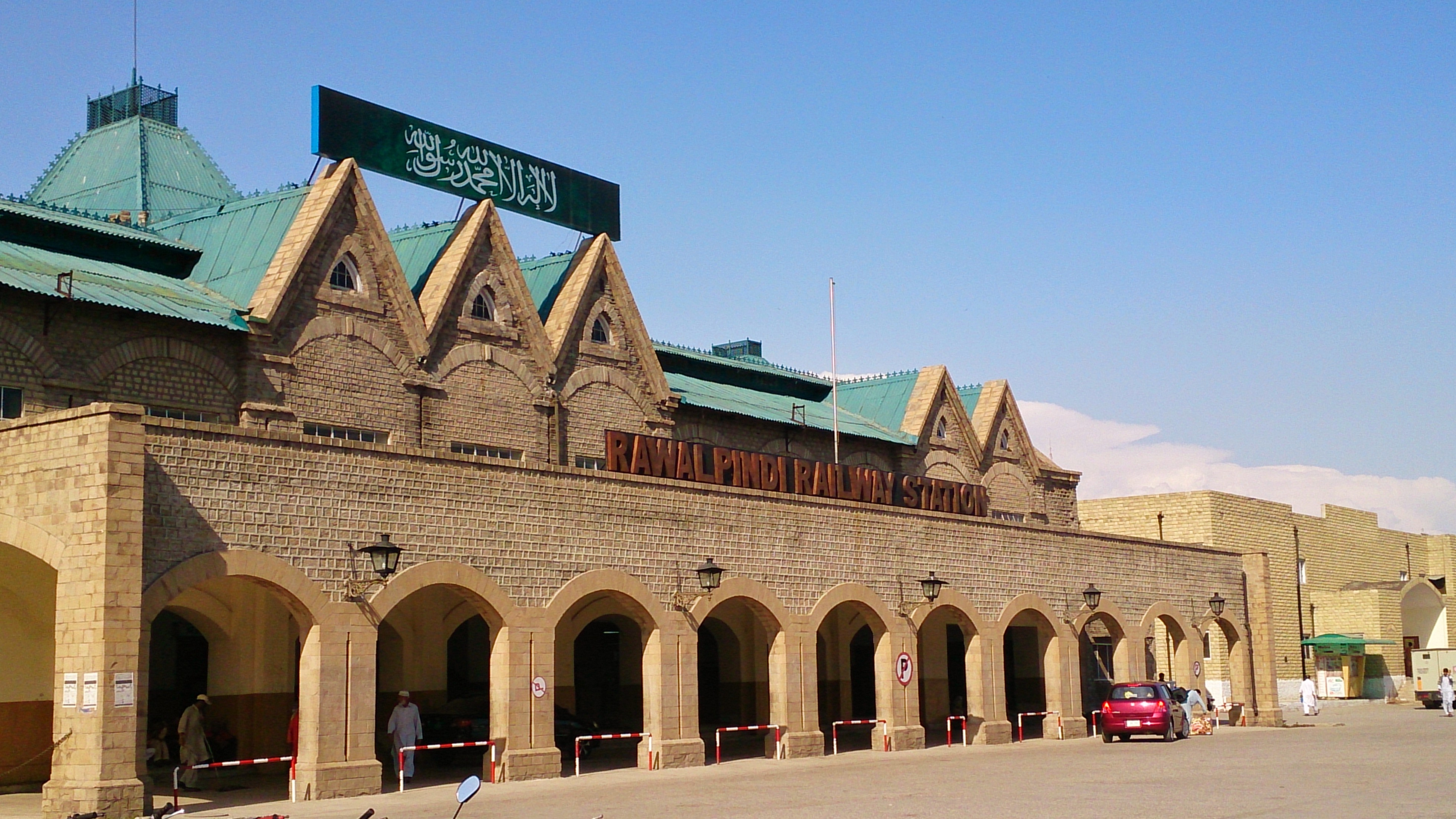
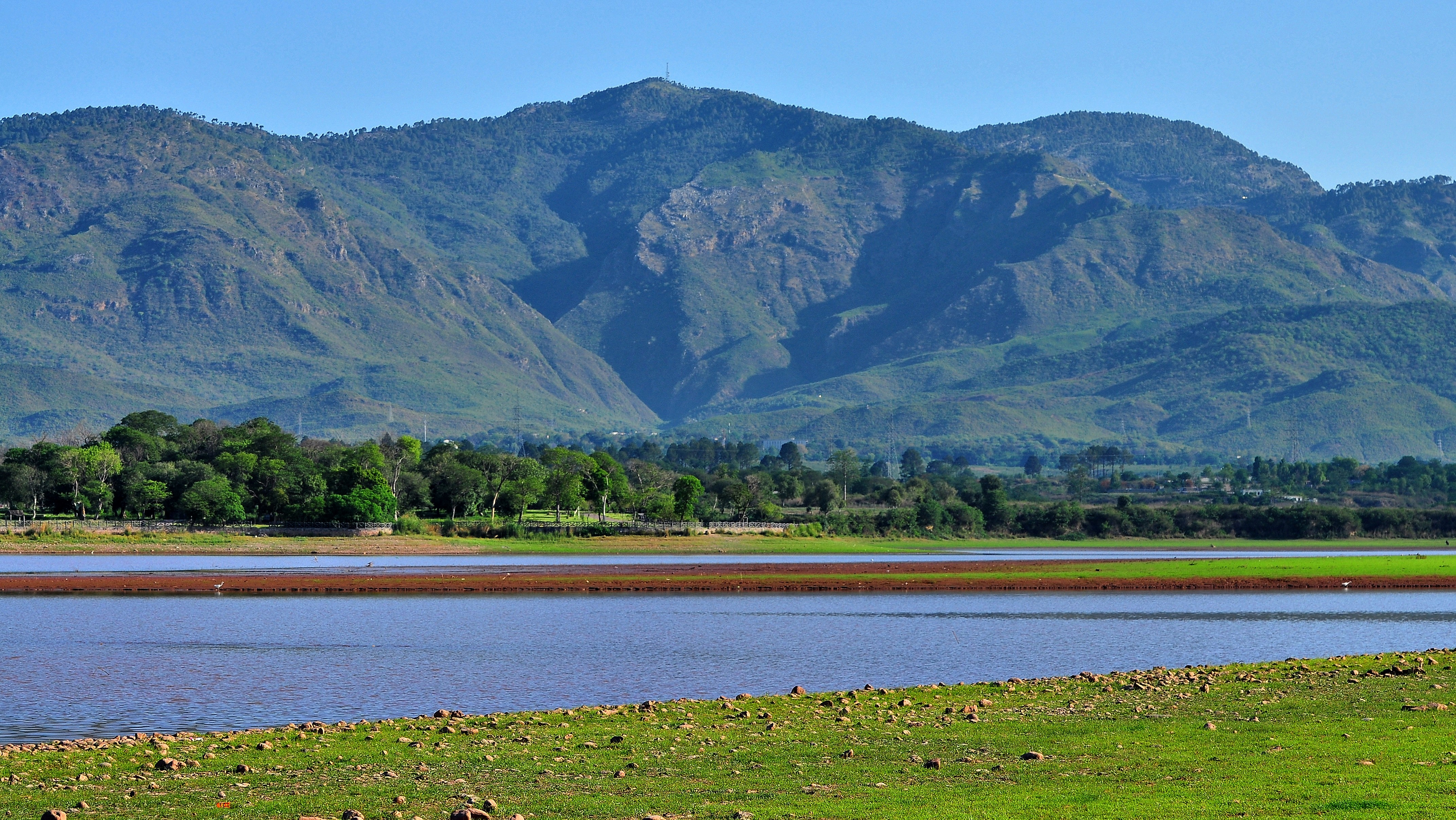
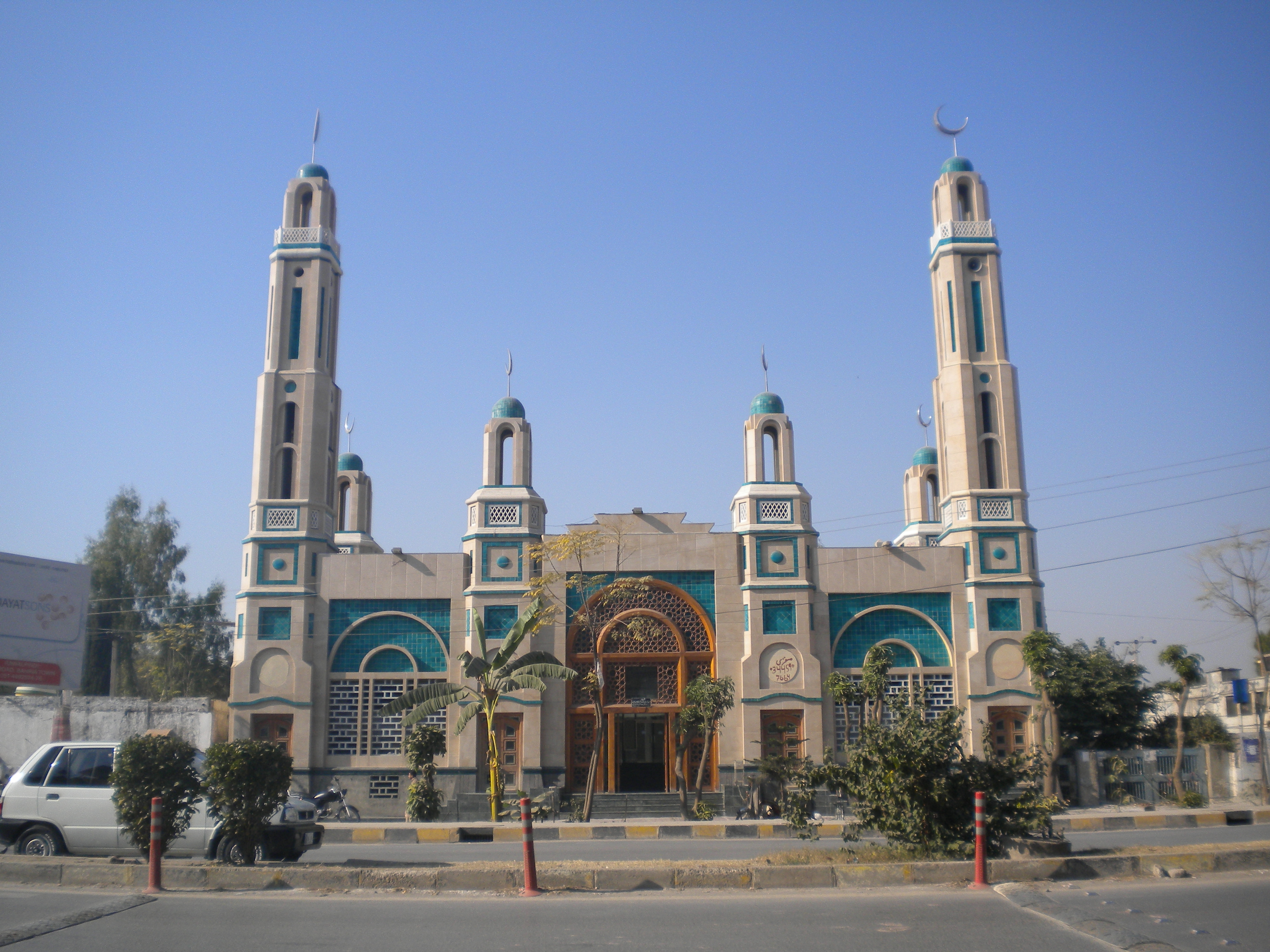
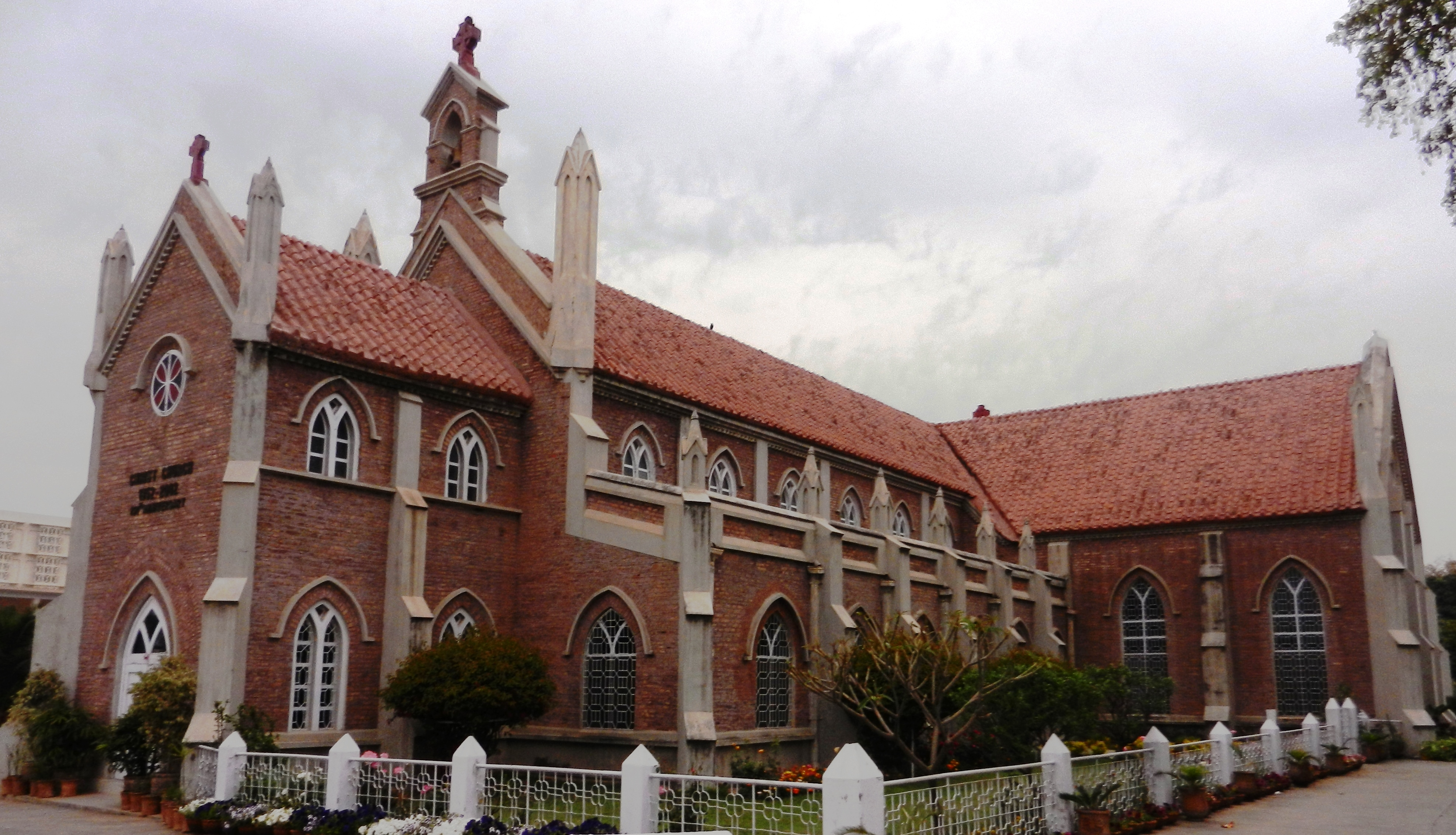
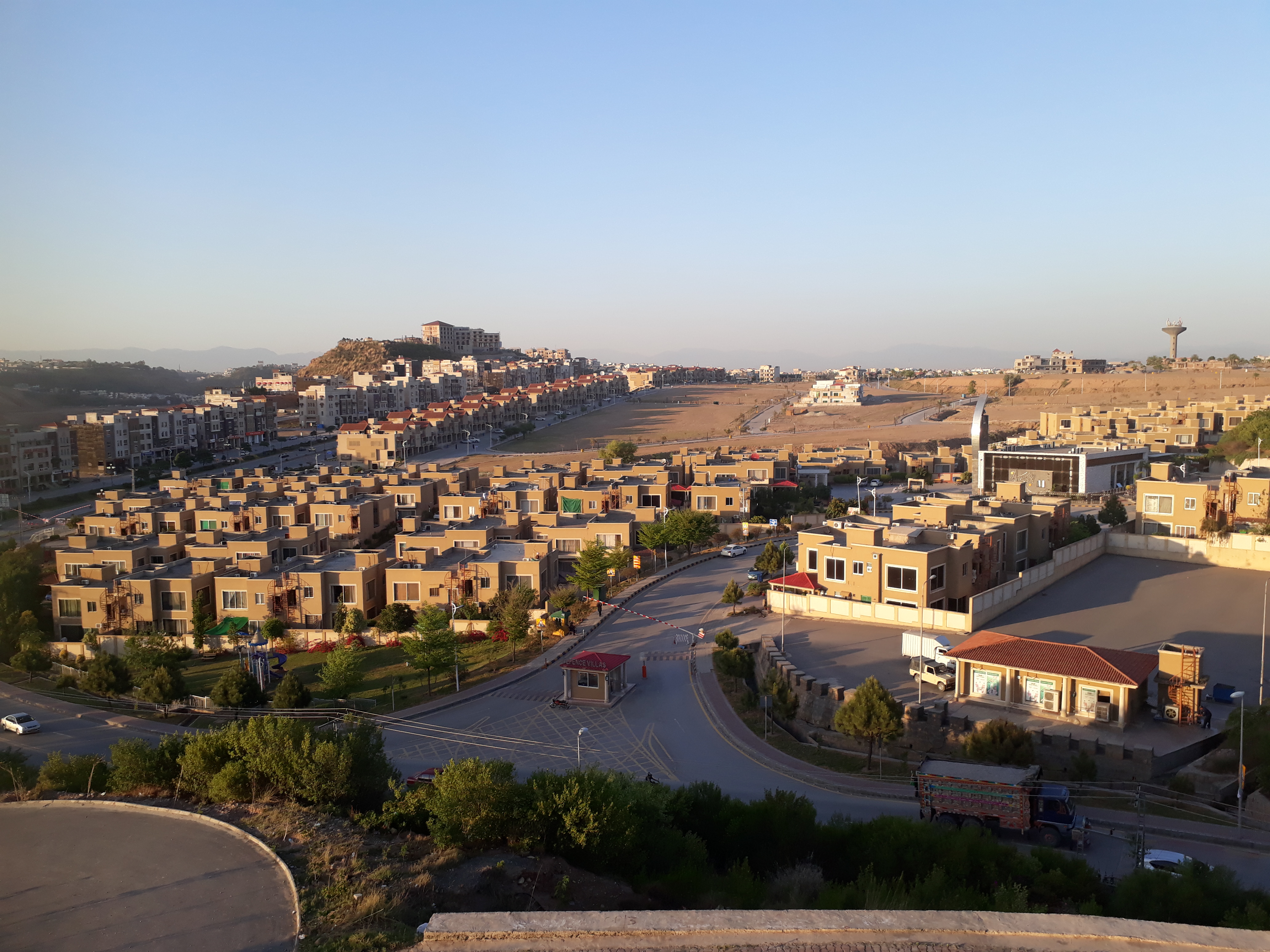
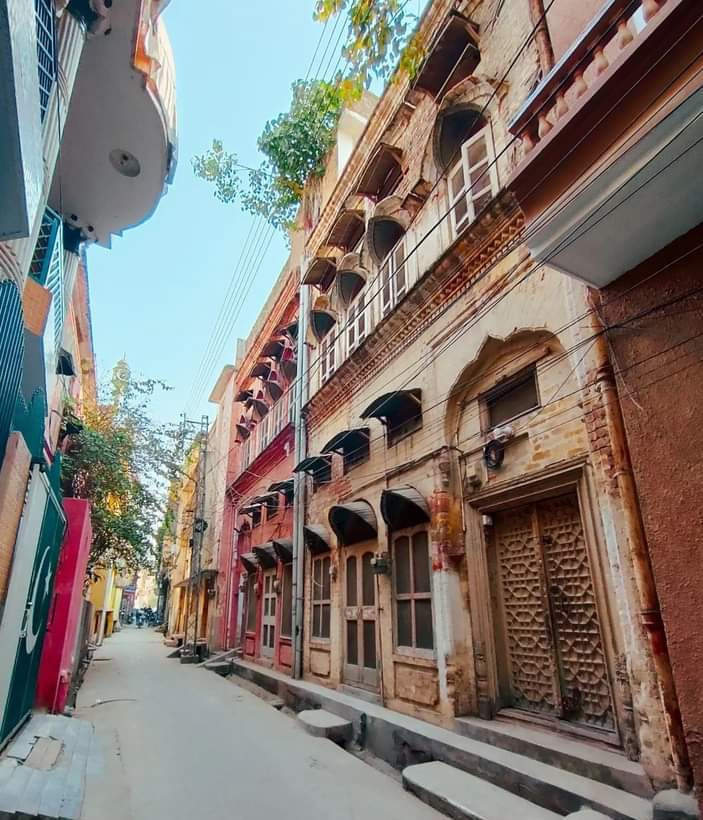
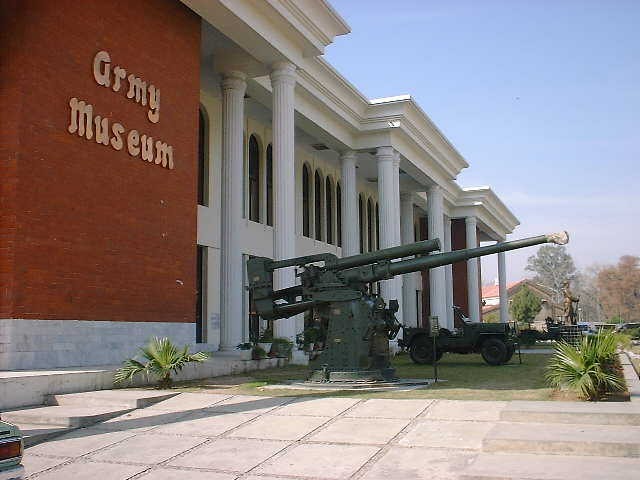
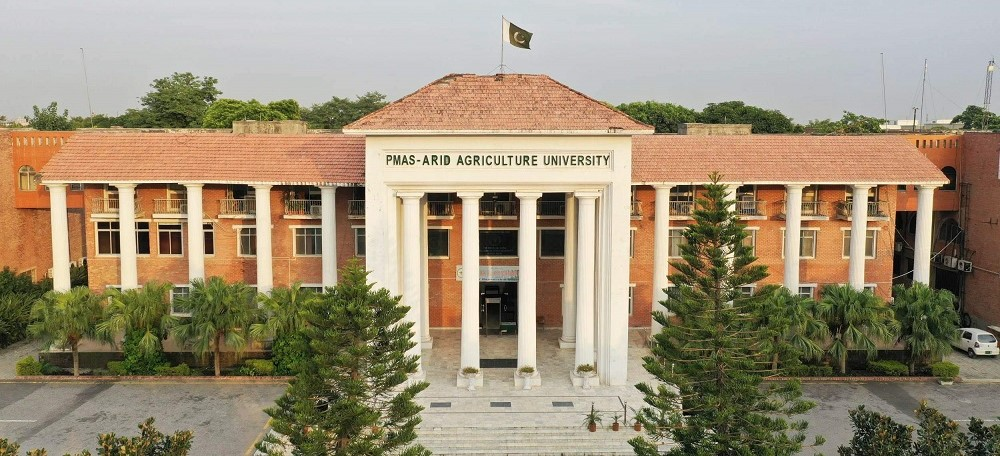
- Railway station Rawal Lake Gulshan Dadan Khan Mosque Christ Church Bahria Town Old Rawalpindi Army Museum Arid Agriculture University

- Flag Emblem
- Nickname: Pindi • Garrison City
- Location in Punjab Location in Pakistan Location in South Asia
- Coordinates: 33°36′N 73°02′E
- Country: Pakistan
- Province: (Punjab, Pakistan) Punjab
- Division: Rawalpindi
- District: Rawalpindi
- Tehsils: 7
- Union councils: 154
- Founded: 1493; 533 years ago
- Municipal status: 1867; 159 years ago
- Named for: Rawal Lake

Government
  - Type: Municipal Corporation
  - Mayor: None (Vacant)
  - Deputy Mayor: None (Vacant)
  - Commissioner: None (Vacant) (BPS-20 PAS)
  - Deputy Commissioner: Captain (R) Nadeem Nasir (BPS-19 PAS)
  - Regional Police Officer(RPO): Babar Sarfraz Alpa (BPS-20 PSP)
  - City Police Officer(CPO): Hassan Mushtaq Sukhera (BPS-20 PSP)

Area
  - City: 4,547 km^{2} (1,756 sq mi)
- Elevation: 508 m (1,667 ft)

Population (2023)
  - City: 3,357,612
  - Rank: 3rd, Punjab; 4th, Pakistan
  - Density: 738.4/km^{2} (1,913/sq mi)
- Time zone: UTC+05:00 (PKT)
  - Summer (DST): PKT
- Postal code: 46000
- Area code: 051
- Official Languages: Urdu; English
- Provincial Language: Punjabi
- Native Language: Punjabi; Pahari-Pothwari
- Development Authority: Rawalpindi Development Authority
- HDI (2024): 0.862 (very high)
- Website: Official Website

Rawalpindi, (Note: Punjabi and Urdu: راولپنڈی, romanized: Rāwalpinḍī, pronounced [ɾaːʋəlpɪnɖiː].) colloquially known as Pindi, (Note: Punjabi: پِنڈی, romanized: Pinḍī.) is the third-largest city in the Pakistani province of Punjab and the fourth-most populous city in Pakistan. Located along the Soan River in north-western Punjab, Rawalpindi lies adjacent to Pakistan's capital, Islamabad, and the two are jointly known as the "twin cities". (Note: The Pakistani government dissolved the Federal Capital Territory of Karachi in 1959, and amalgamated it into the province of West Pakistan. The state institutions were shifted temporarily to Rawalpindi whilst the future capital of Islamabad was being constructed adjacent to it. Rawalpindi's status as the de-facto capital ended after the Islamabad Capital Territory was established and state institutions began gradually shifting out of the city.)

Rawalpindi is located on the Pothohar Plateau and is close to the ancient city of Taxila, a UNESCO World Heritage Site. It was founded in 1493 by a Gakhar chief and remained a small town until the 18th century. Following the annexation of Punjab by the East India Company in 1849, Rawalpindi became the largest garrison town of the Northern Command of the British Indian Army with the establishment of the Rawalpindi Cantonment. It was granted municipal status in 1867. Following the independence of Pakistan on 14 August 1947, the city became home to the General Headquarters (GHQ) of the Pakistan Army. (Note: citations:)

Rawalpindi also served as the secondary capital of Pakistan, under Ayub Khan, before the new capital was established in Islamabad. Rawalpindi is linked to the national highways through the M-1 and M-2 motorways, and serves as a major logistics and transportation centre for northern Pakistan. The city is home to historic havelis and temples, and serves as a hub for tourists visiting Azad Kashmir, Taxila and Gilgit-Baltistan. (Note: citations:)

== Etymology ==
Previously known as Fatehpur Baori, the town fell into decay during the Mongol invasions of the 14th century. Afterwards, it came in hand of the Gakhars and a chief named Jhanda Khan restored it naming it Rawalpindi in 1493, literally meaning the "Village of Rawal" in Punjabi. Some accounts propose that a group of ascetics named Rawal arrived in this area and established the town.

== History ==
=== Origins ===
The region around Rawalpindi has been inhabited for thousands of years. The Soan River valley, which runs through the district, was the center of the Soanian culture, an Lower Paleolithic human culture. Numerous quartzite stone tools, including pebble choppers and hand axes dating back to the Middle Pleistocene epoch, have been excavated at prehistoric sites across the Soan Valley near modern-day Rawalpindi, such as Adiala and Chauntra.

Popular folk traditions trace the origin of the name Rawal da Pind to the 8th-century Mewar ruler Bappa Rawal, claiming his military encampment established a settlement in the region, though standard academic histories attribute the modern city's founding to the 18th-century Gakhar ruler Jhanda Khan. Rawalpindi falls within the ancient region of Gandhara (a kingdom during Mahabharat time), and thus the area contains many Buddhist ruins. In the north-west of Rawalpindi, traces have been found of at least 55 stupas, 28 Buddhist monasteries, 9 temples, and various artifacts in the Kharoshthi script.

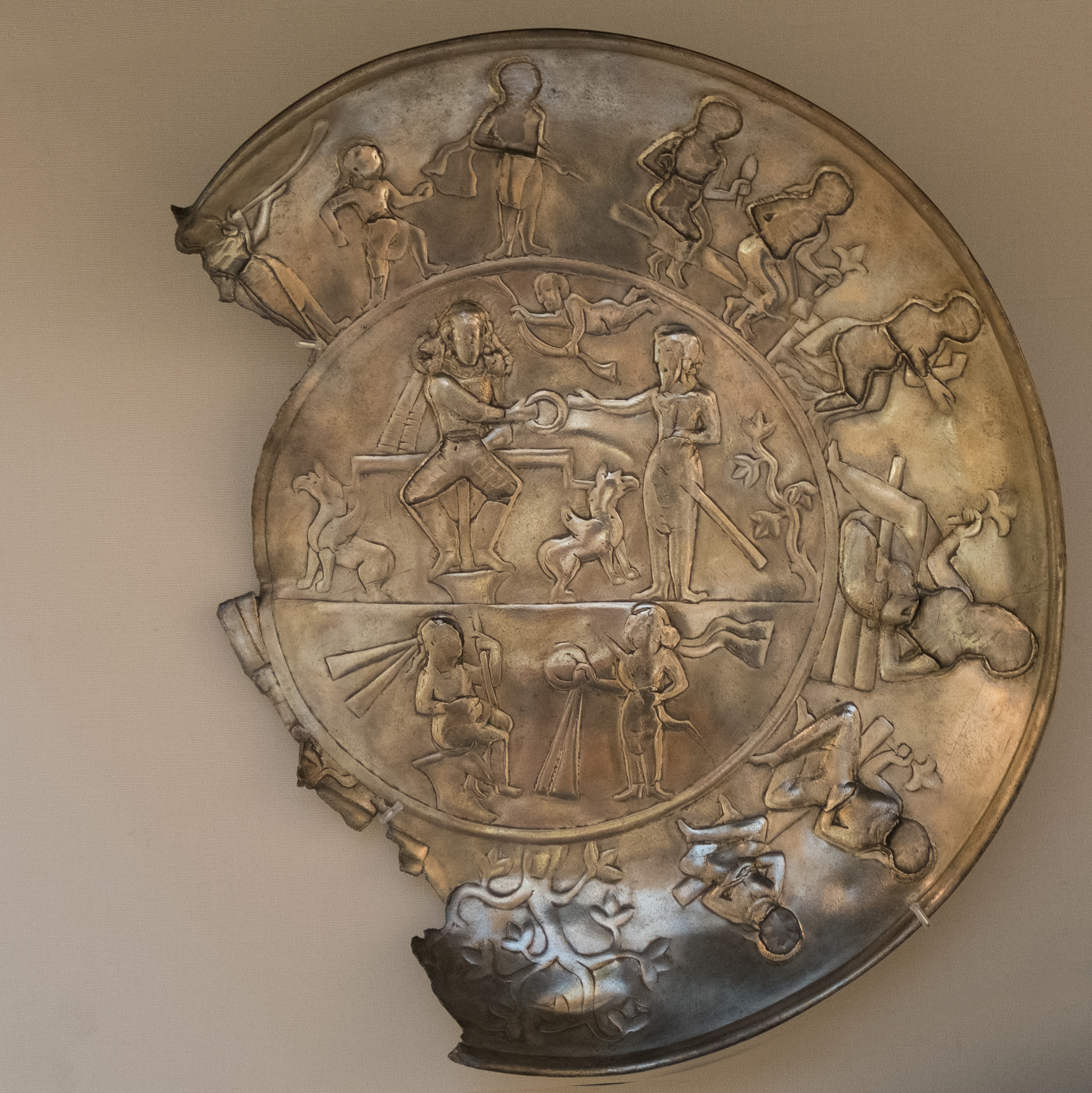
Possible Kushano-Sasanian plate, excavated in Rawalpindi, fourth century CE. British Museum 124093.

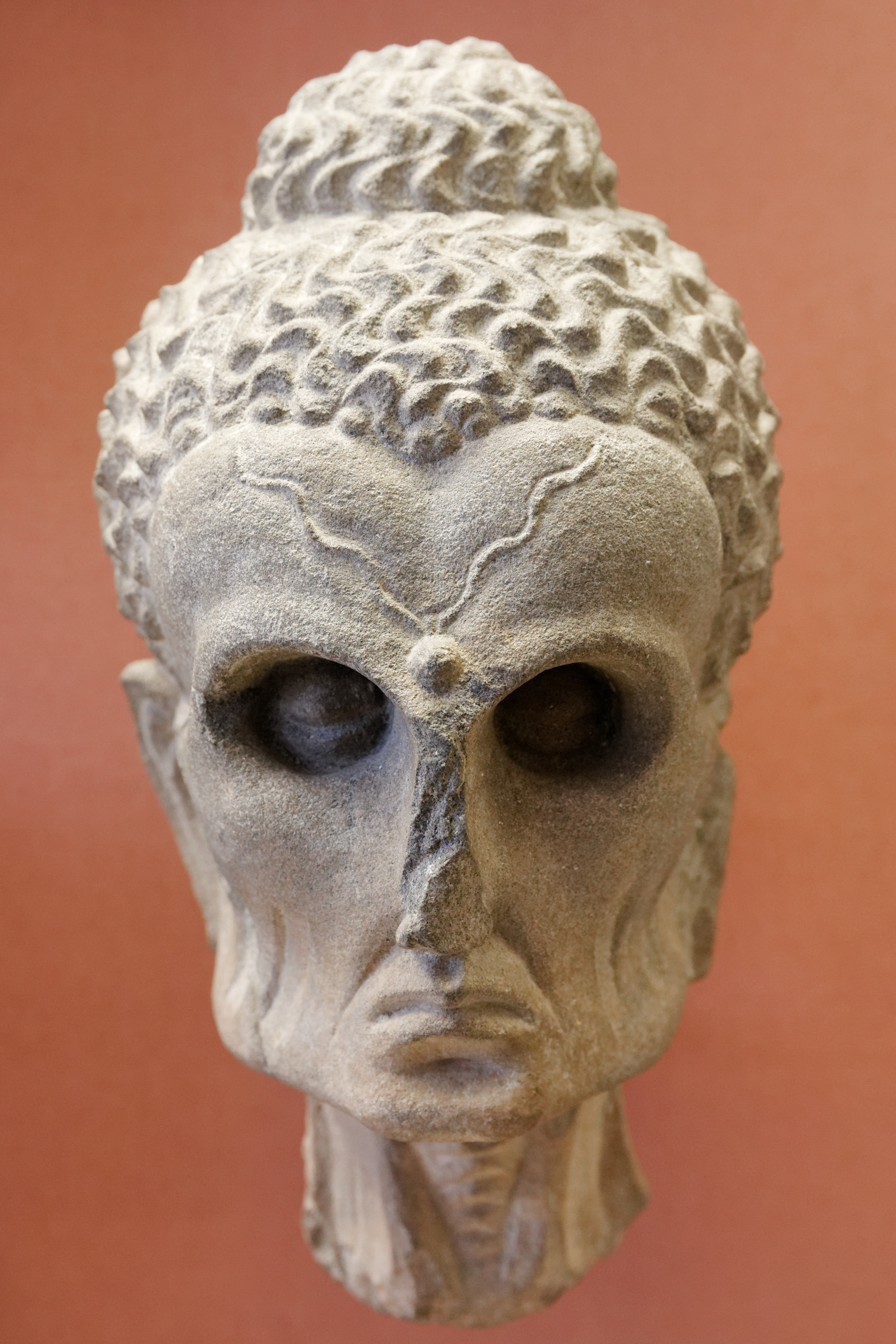
The "Fasting Buddha", on display at the British Museum in London, was discovered in Rawalpindi.

To the southeast are the ruins of the Mankiala stupa – a second-century stupa where, according to the Jataka tales, a previous incarnation of the Buddha leapt off a cliff in order to offer his corpse to seven hungry tiger cubs. The town of Taxila is thought to have been home to one of the early universities or education centres of South Asia.

=== Medieval ===
The first mention of Rawalpindi's earliest settlement dates from when Mahmud of Ghazni destroyed Rawalpindi and the town was restored by Gakhar chief Kai Gohar in the early 11th century. The town fell into decay again after Mongol invasions in the 14th century. Situated along an invasion route, the settlement did not prosper and remained deserted until 1493, when Jhanda Khan Gakhar re-established the ruined town, and named it Rawal.

=== Mughal period ===
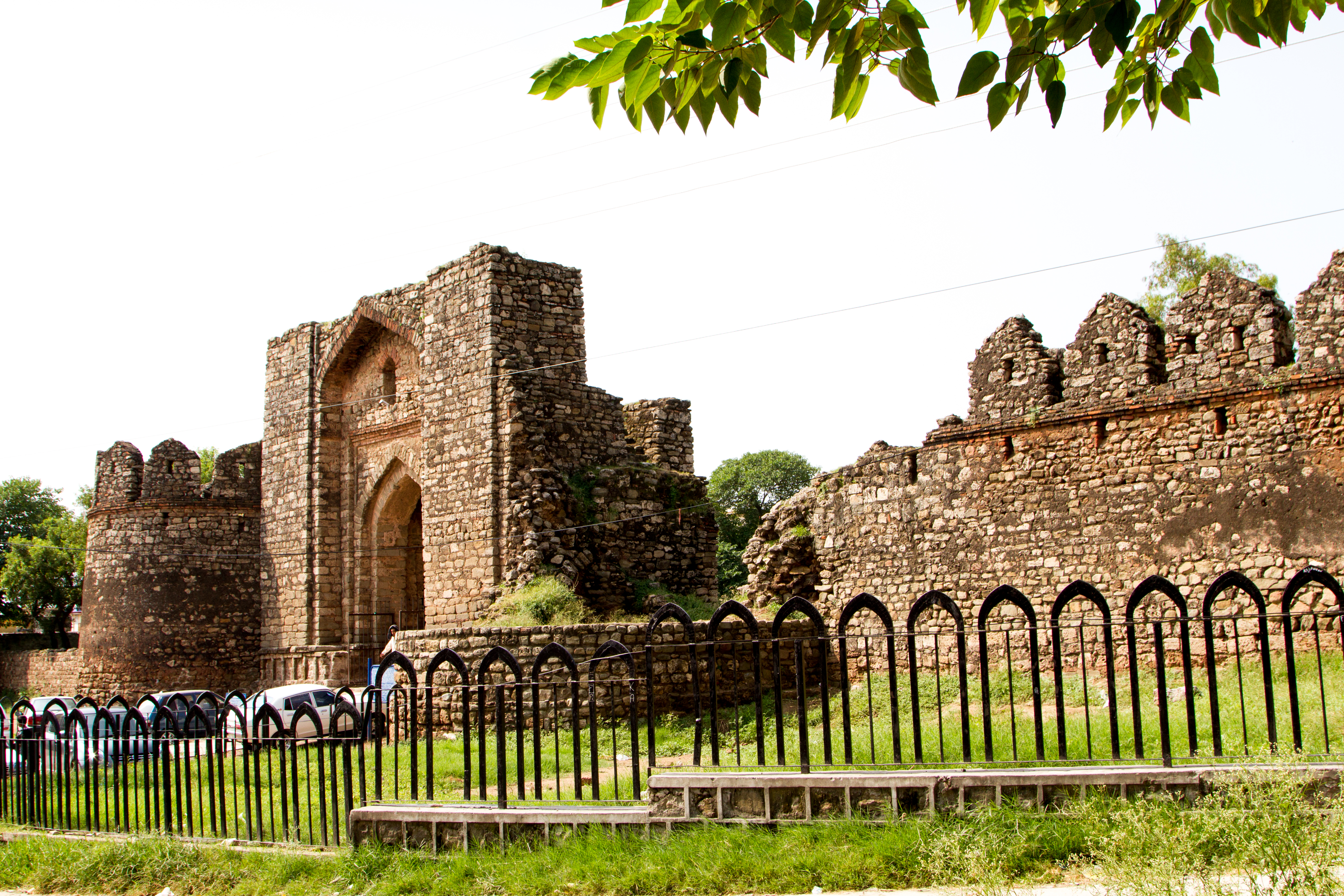
The 16th century Rawat Fort, a fortified caravanserai.

During the Mughal era, Rawalpindi remained under the rule of the Gakhar clan, who in turn pledged allegiance to the Mughal Empire. Gakhars also fortified a nearby caravanserai, the Serai Rawat. The Attock Fort was constructed in 1581 after Akbar led a campaign against his brother Mirza Muhammad Hakim. In December 1585, the Emperor Akbar arrived in Rawalpindi, and remained in and around Rawalpindi for 13 years as he extended the frontiers of the empire, in an era described as a "glorious period" in his career as Emperor.

With the onset of rivalry between Gakhar chiefs after the death of Kamal Khan in 1559, Rawalpindi was awarded to his brother Said Khan by the Mughal Emperor. Emperor Jehangir visited the royal camp in Rawalpindi in 1622, where he first learned of Shah Abbas I of Persia's plan to invade Kandahar.

=== Sikh rule ===
After the Mughal power declined, the town was captured in the winter of 1767 from Muqarrab Khan Gakhar by the Sikhs under Sardar Gujjar Singh and his son Sahib Singh. The city's administration was handed to Sardar Milkha Singh, who invited traders from the neighbouring commercial centers of Jhelum and Shahpur to settle in the territory in 1767. The city began to prosper, although the population in 1770 is estimated to have been only about 300 families (approx. 1,500 to 1,800 people).Rawalpindi was a small place at the time, consisting of a few huts associated with Rawal Hindu mendicants. For a time Rawalpindi became the refuge of Shah Shuja, the exiled king of Afghanistan, and of his brother Shah Zaman in the early 19th century.

The Sikh ruler Maharaja Ranjit Singh allowed the son of Sardar Milkha Singh to continue as Governor of Rawalpindi, after he seized it in 1810. Sikh rule over Rawalpindi was consolidated by defeat of the Afghans at Haidru in July 1813. In late 1820s, Rawalpindi and surrounding areas became a centre of jihad movement of Syed Ahmad Barelvi. The Mujahideen victory at Akora Khattak in 1827 was followed by defeat and death of Ahmad Barelvi in 1831 at Balakot. Jews first arrived in Rawalpindi's Babu Mohallah neighbourhood from Mashhad, Persia in 1839, in order to flee from anti-Jewish laws instituted by the Qajar dynasty. In 1841, Diwan Kishan Kaur was appointed Sardar of Rawalpindi.

On 14 March 1849, Sardar Chattar Singh and Raja Sher Singh of the Sikh Empire surrendered to General Gilbert near Rawalpindi, ceding the city to the British. The Sikh Empire then came to an end on 29 March 1849.

=== British period ===
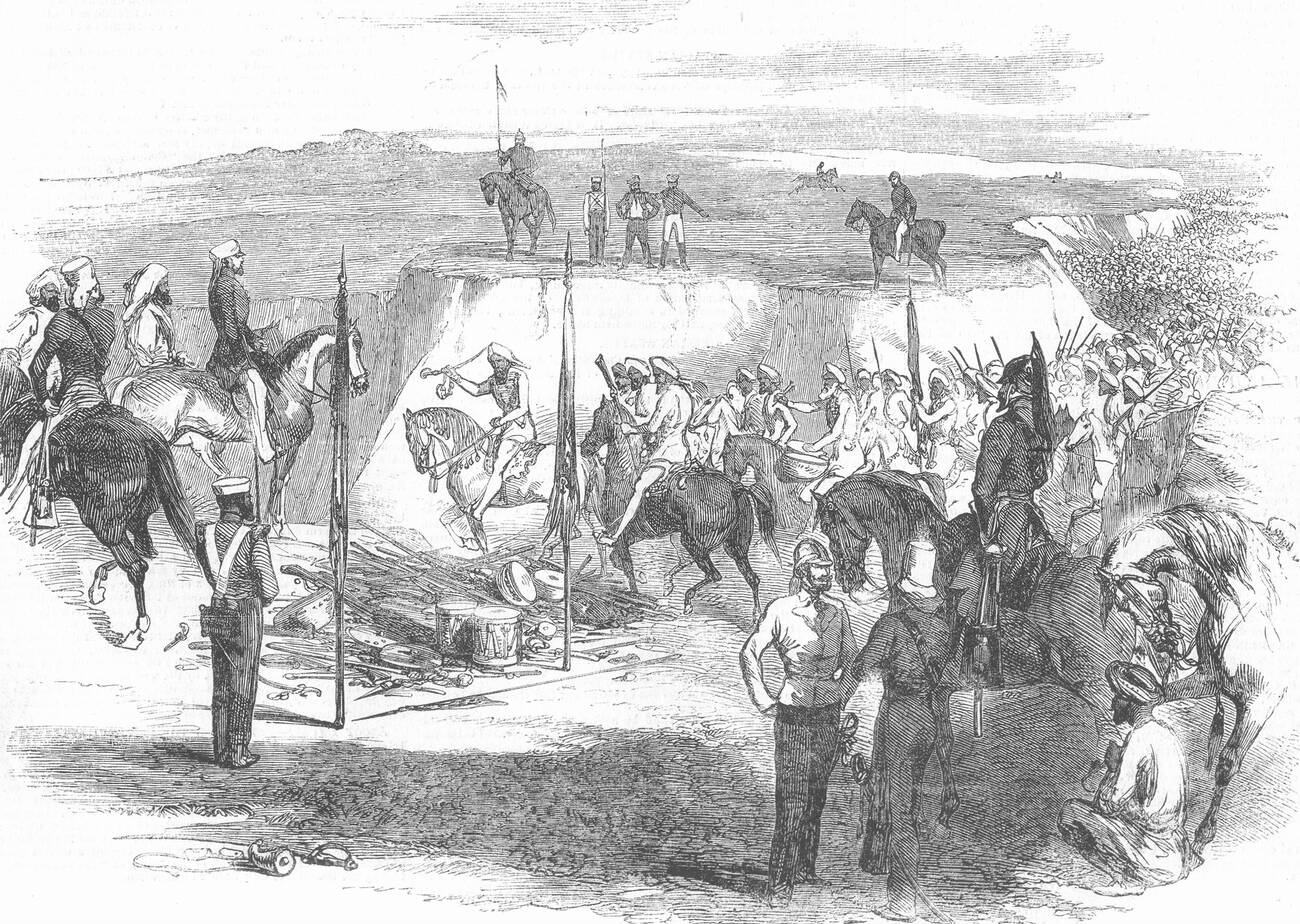
The Sikh cavalry delivering up their arms at Rawalpindi, March 14, 1849," from the Illustrated London News.

Wood engraving depicting an old caravanserai in Rawalpindi (1880)

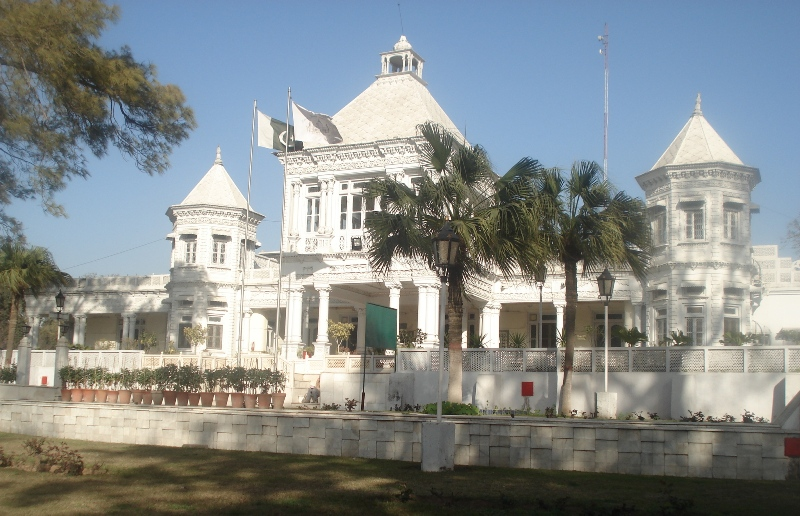
Rawalpindi's Fatima Jinnah Women University is housed in a Victorian mansion.

Following Rawalpindi's capture by the British East India Company, 53rd Regiment of the company army took quarters in the newly captured city. The decision to man a permanent military cantonment in the city was made in 1851 by the Marquess of Dalhousie.

The city saw its first telegraph office in the early 1850s. The city's Garrison Church was built shortly after in 1854, and is the site where Robert Milman, Bishop of Calcutta, was buried following his death in Rawalpindi in 1876. The city was home to 15,913 people in the 1855 census. During the 1857 War of Independence, the Gakhar and Janjua tribes remained loyal to the British. Numerous civil and military buildings were built during the British era, and the Municipality of Rawalpindi was constituted in 1867, while the city's population as per the 1868 census was 19,228, with another 9,358 people residing in the city's cantonment.

The city was also connected to railways that offered connection to India and the northwest frontier in Peshawar in the 1880s. The Commissariat Steam Flour Mills were the first such mills in Punjab, and supplied most of the needs of British cantonments throughout Punjab. Rawalpindi's cantonment served as a feeder to other cantonments throughout the region.

Rawalpindi flourished as a commercial centre, though the city remained largely devoid of an industrial base during the British era. A large portion of Kashmir's external trade passing through the city; in 1885, 14% of Kashmir's exports, and 27% of its imports passed through the city. A large market was opened in central Rawalpindi in 1883 by Sardar Sujan Singh, while the British further developed a shopping district for the city's elite known as Saddar with an archway built to commemorate Brigadier General Massey.

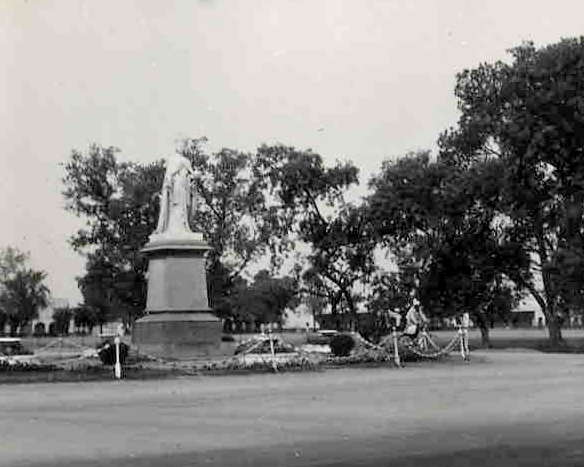
Statue of Queen Victoria, Rawalpindi, 1939

Rawalpindi's cantonment became a major centre of military power of the Raj after an arsenal was established in 1883. Britain's army elevated the city from a small town, to the third largest city in Punjab by 1921. In 1868, 9,358 people lived in the city's cantonment – by 1891, the number rose to 37,870. In 1891, the city's population excluding the Cantonment was 34,153. The city was considered to be a favourite first posting for newly arrived soldiers from England, owing to the city's agreeable climate, and the nearby hill station of Murree.

In 1901, Rawalpindi was made the winter headquarters of the Northern Command and of the Rawalpindi military division. Riots broke out against British rule in 1905, following a famine in Punjab that peasants were led to believe was a deliberate act.

During World War I, Rawalpindi District "stood first" among districts in recruiting for the British war effort, with greater financial assistance from the British government channeled into the area in return.

By 1921, Rawalpindi's cantonment had overshadowed the city – Rawalpindi was one of seven cities of Punjab in which over half the population lived in the cantonment district. Communal riots erupted between Rawalpindi's Sikh and Muslim communities in 1926 after Sikhs refused to silence music from a procession that was passing in front of a mosque.

HMS Rawalpindi was launched as an ocean liner in 1925 by Harland and Wolff, the same company which built RMS Titanic. The ship was converted into an armed vessel, and was sunk in October 1939. Scientists from Porton Down carried out poison gas tests on British Indian Army soldiers during the Rawalpindi experiments over the course of more than a decade beginning in the 1930s.

=== Partition ===
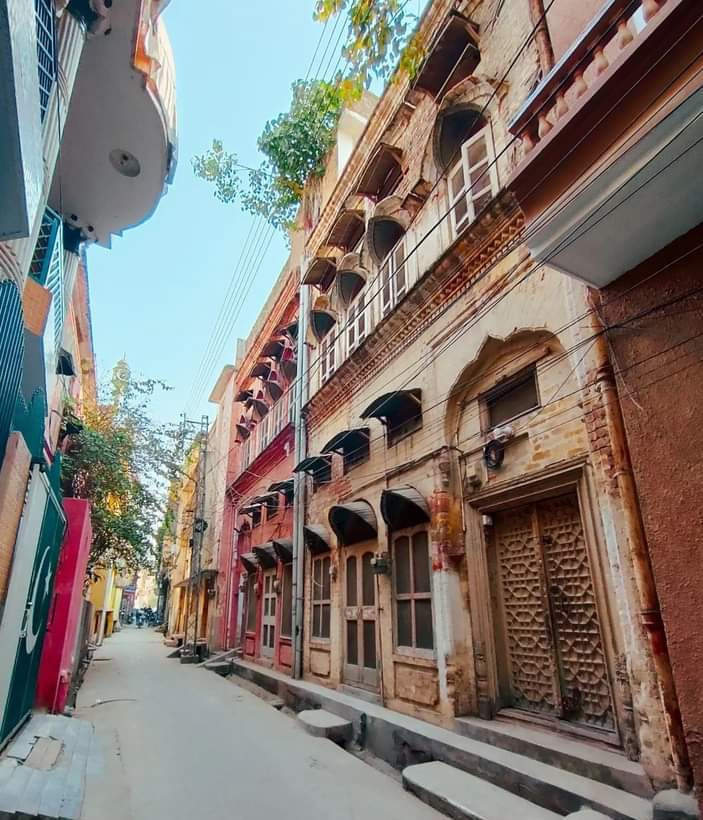
Andaroon Raja Bazaar streets

On 5 March 1947, members of Rawalpindi's Hindu and Sikh communities took a procession against the formation of a Muslim League ministry within the Government of Punjab. Policemen fired upon protestors, while Hindus and Sikhs fought against weaker Muslim counter-protestors. The area's first Partition riots erupted the next day on 6 March 1947, when the city's Muslims, angered by the actions of Hindus and Sikhs and encouraged by the Pir of Golra Sharif, raided nearby villages after they were unable to do so in the city on account of Rawalpindi's heavily armed Sikhs. Thousands of Sikhs and Hindus were killed in villages surrounding Rawalpindi, in large scale and widespread violence that came to be known as the Rawalpindi massacres.

At the dawn of Pakistan's independence in 1947 following the success of the Pakistan Movement, Rawalpindi was 43.79% Muslim, while Rawalpindi District as a whole was 80% Muslim. The region, on account of its large Muslim majority, was thus awarded to Pakistan. Rawalpindi's Hindu and Sikh population, who had made up 33.72% and 17.32% of the city, migrated en masse to the newly independent Dominion of India after anti-Hindu and anti-Sikh pogroms in western Punjab, while Muslim refugees from India settled in the city following anti-Muslim pogroms in eastern Punjab and northern India.

=== Modern ===
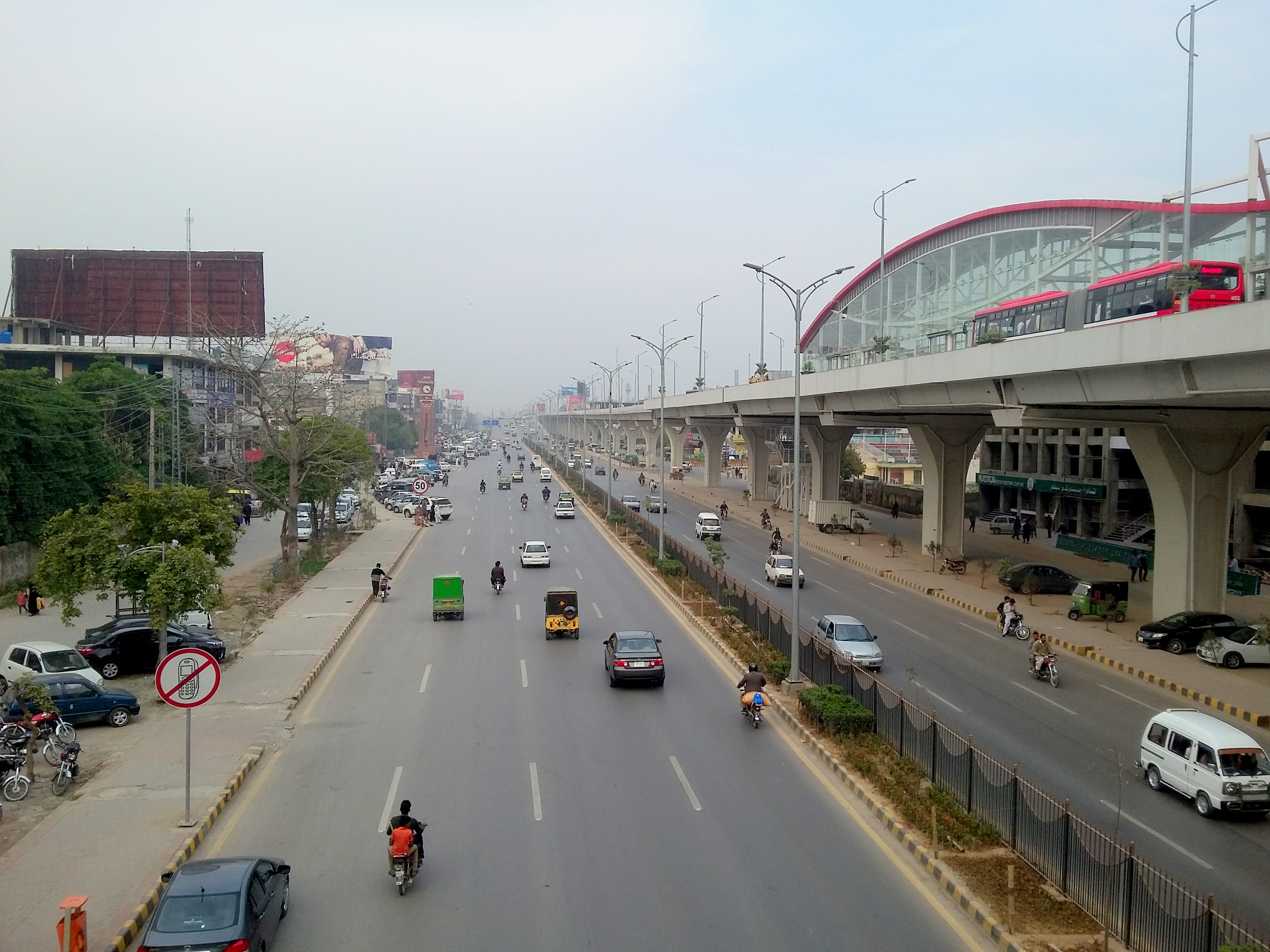
Murree Road is one of the main arteries in Rawalpindi.

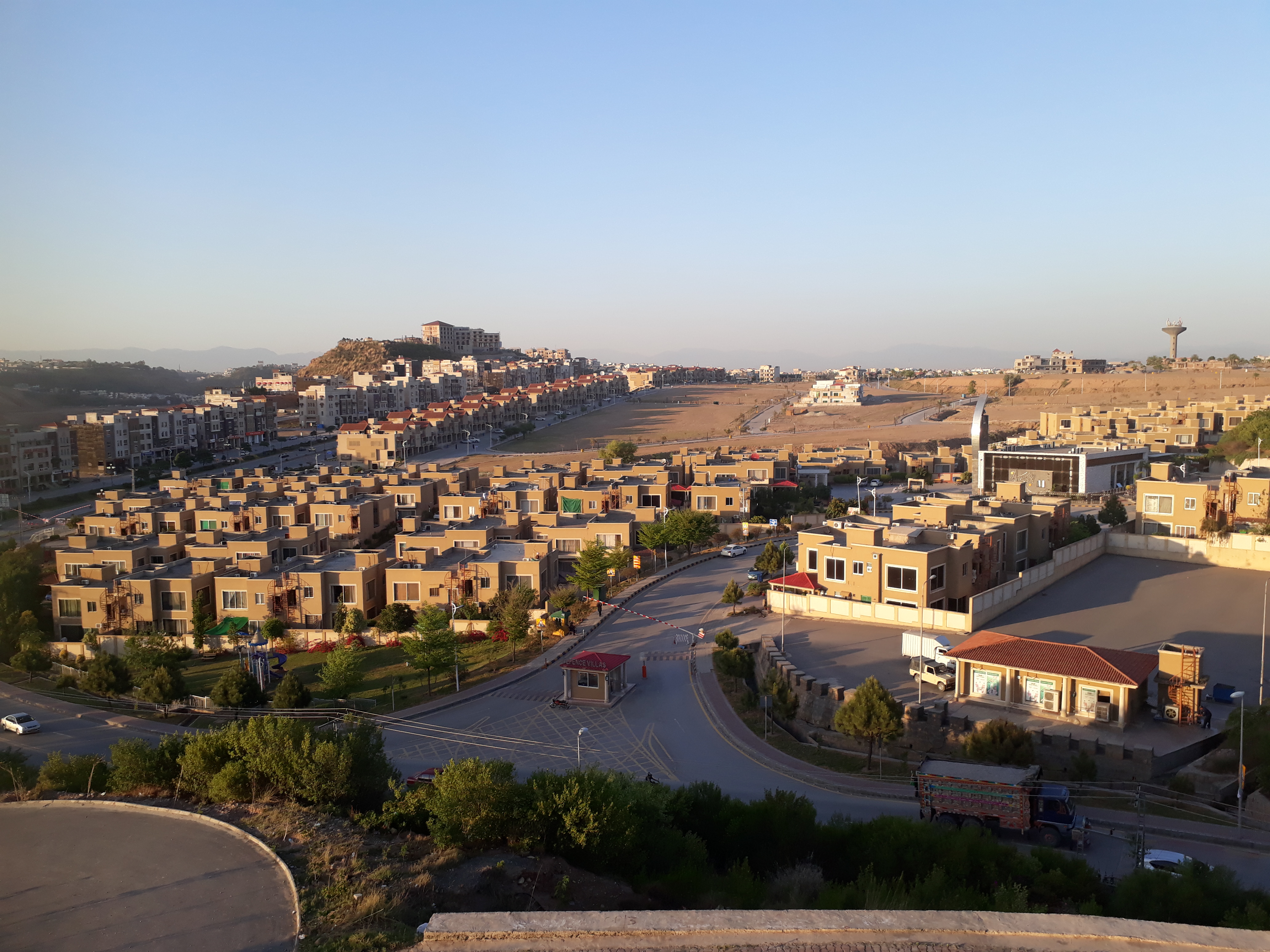
Bahria Town is an affordable locality in Rawalpindi

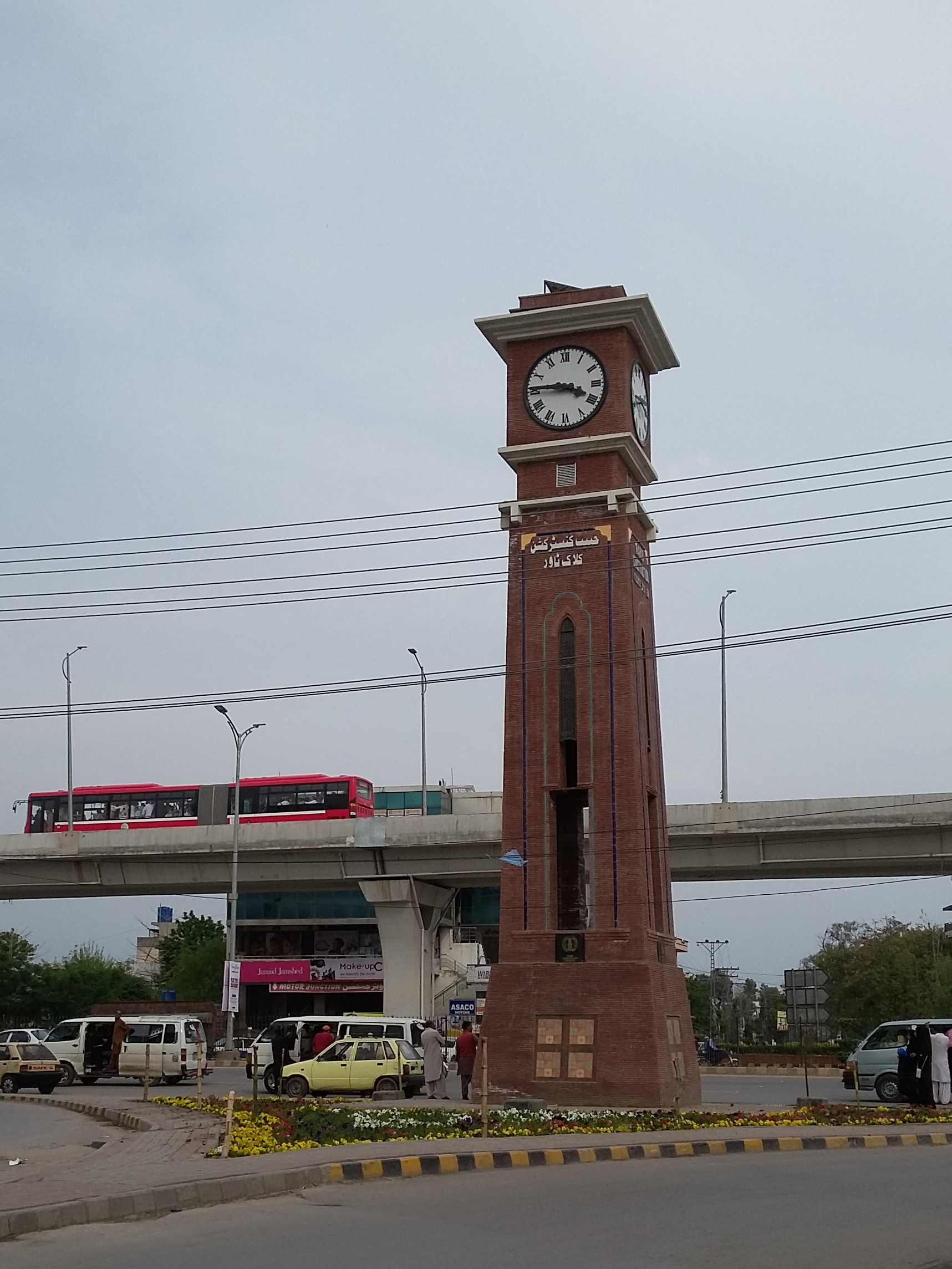
Rehman Abad Clock Tower Rawalpindi

In the years following independence, Rawalpindi saw an influx of Muhajir, Pashtun and Kashmiri settlers. Having been the largest British Cantonment in the region at the dawn of Pakistan's independence, Rawalpindi was chosen as headquarters for the Pakistani Army, despite the fact that Karachi had been selected as the first capital.

In 1951, the Rawalpindi conspiracy took place in which leftist army officers conspired to depose the first elected Prime Minister of Pakistan, Liaquat Ali Khan. Rawalpindi later became the site of the Liaquat Ali Khan's assassination, in what is now known as Liaquat Bagh Park. In 1958, Field Marshal Ayub Khan launched his coup d'etat from Rawalpindi. In 1959, the city became the interim capital of the country under Ayub Khan, who had sought the creation of a new planned capital of Islamabad in the vicinity of Rawalpindi. As a result, Rawalpindi saw most major central government offices and institutions relocate to nearby territory, and its population rapidly expand.

The construction of Pakistan's new capital city of Islamabad in 1961 led to greater investment in Rawalpindi. Rawalpindi remained the headquarters of the Pakistani Army after the capital shifted to Islamabad in 1969, while the Pakistan Air Force continues to maintain an airbase in the Chaklala district of Rawalpindi. The military dictatorship of General Zia ul Haq hanged Pakistan's deposed Prime Minister, Zulfikar Ali Bhutto, in Rawalpindi in 1979.

In 1980, tens of thousands of Shia protestors led by Mufti Jaffar Hussain marched to Rawalpindi to protest a provision of Zia ul Haqs Islamization programme. A spate of bombings in September 1987 took place in the city killing 5 people, in attacks that are believed to have been orchestrated by agents of Afghanistan's communist government.

On 10 April 1988, Rawalpindi's Ojhri Camp, an ammunition depot for Afghan mujahideen fighting against Soviet forces in Afghanistan, exploded and killed many in Rawalpindi and Islamabad. At the time, the New York Times reported more than 93 were killed and another 1,100 wounded; many believe that the toll was much higher.

Riots erupted in Rawalpindi in 1992 as mobs attacked Hindu temples in retaliation for the destruction of the Babri Masjid in India. On 27 December 2007, Rawalpindi was the site of the assassination of former Prime Minister Benazir Bhutto.

Modern Rawalpindi is socially and economically intertwined with Islamabad, and the greater metropolitan area. The city is also home to numerous suburban housing developments that serve as bedroom-communities for workers in Islamabad. In June 2015, the Rawalpindi-Islamabad Metrobus, a new bus rapid transit line with various points in Islamabad, opened for service.

== Geography ==
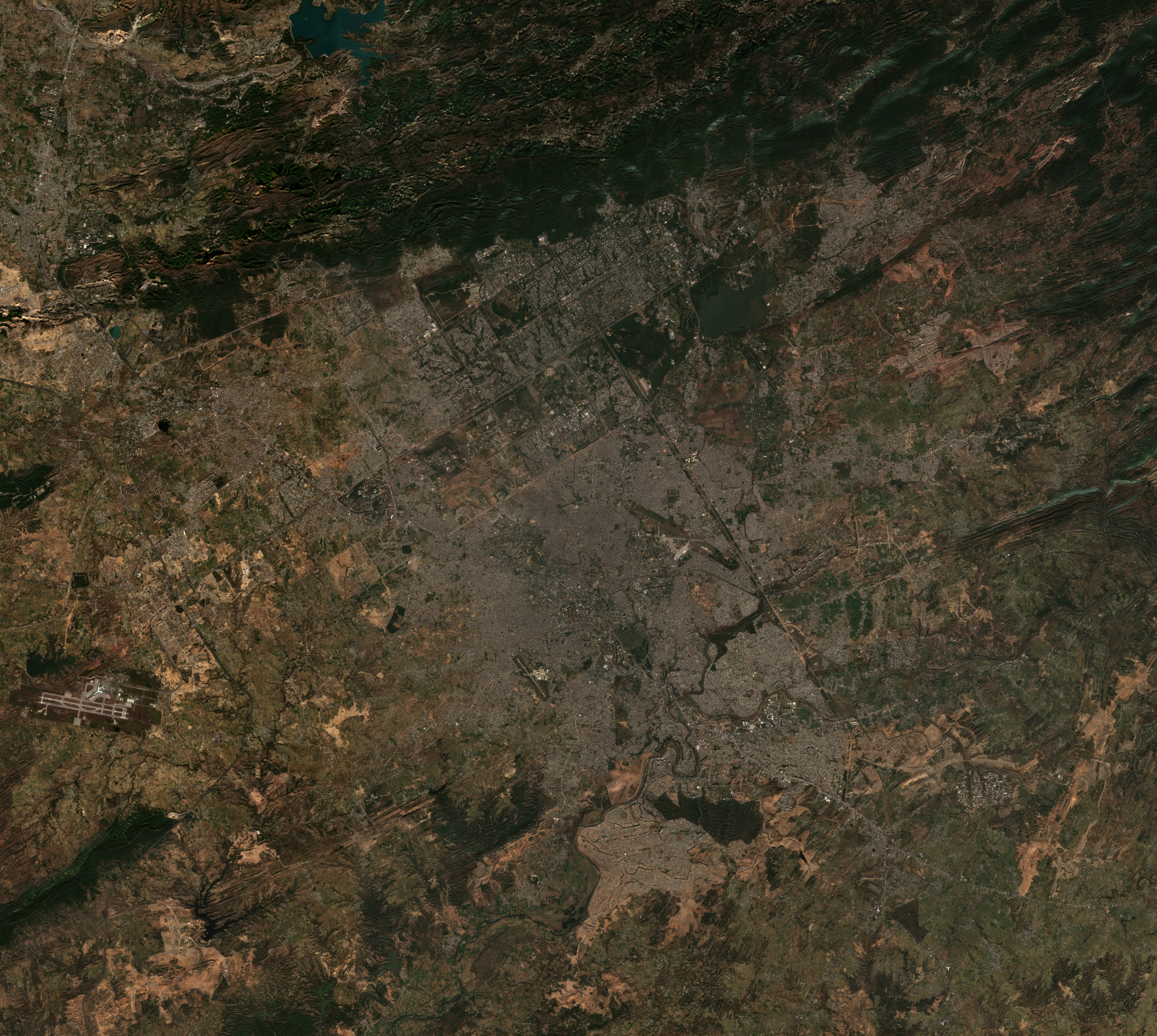
Satellite image of Islamabad-Rawalpindi metropolitan area with Margalla Hills to the north and Potohar Plateau on the other 3 sides.

=== Climate ===
Rawalpindi features a humid subtropical climate (Köppen: Cwa) with hot and wet summers, a cooler and drier winter. Rawalpindi and its twin city Islamabad, during the year experiences an average of 91 thunderstorms, which is the highest frequency of any plain elevation city in the country. Strong windstorms are frequent in the summer during which wind gusts have been reported by Pakistan Meteorological Department to have reached 176 km/h (109 mph). In such thunder/wind storms, which results in some damage of infrastructure. The weather is highly variable due to the proximity of the city to the foothills of Himalayas.

The average annual rainfall is 1,254.8 mm (49.40 in), most of which falls in the summer monsoon season. However, westerly disturbances also bring quite significant rainfall in the winter. In summer, the record maximum temperature has soared to 47.7 °C (118 °F) recorded in June 1954, while it has dropped to a minimum of −3.9 °C (25 °F) several occasions, though the last of which was in January 1967.

Climate data for Rawalpindi
Month	Jan	Feb	Mar	Apr	May	Jun	Jul	Aug	Sep	Oct	Nov	Dec	Year
Record high °C (°F)	30.1 (86.2)	30 (86)	34.5 (94.1)	40.6 (105.1)	45.6 (114.1)	47.7 (117.9)	44.4 (111.9)	42 (108)	38.1 (100.6)	37.5 (99.5)	32.2 (90.0)	28.3 (82.9)	47.7 (117.9)
Mean daily maximum °C (°F)	17.9 (64.2)	19.7 (67.5)	24.5 (76.1)	30.5 (86.9)	36.0 (96.8)	38.4 (101.1)	35.3 (95.5)	33.7 (92.7)	33.7 (92.7)	30.9 (87.6)	25.9 (78.6)	20.2 (68.4)	28.9 (84.0)
Daily mean °C (°F)	10.6 (51.1)	12.9 (55.2)	17.6 (63.7)	23.2 (73.8)	28.4 (83.1)	31.1 (88.0)	29.9 (85.8)	28.8 (83.8)	27.4 (81.3)	22.7 (72.9)	17.1 (62.8)	12.3 (54.1)	21.8 (71.3)
Mean daily minimum °C (°F)	3.2 (37.8)	6.0 (42.8)	10.7 (51.3)	15.8 (60.4)	20.7 (69.3)	23.7 (74.7)	24.4 (75.9)	23.8 (74.8)	21.1 (70.0)	14.5 (58.1)	8.3 (46.9)	4.3 (39.7)	14.7 (58.5)
Record low °C (°F)	−3.9 (25.0)	−2.7 (27.1)	1.1 (34.0)	5.0 (41.0)	6.1 (43.0)	15.5 (59.9)	17.2 (63.0)	17.2 (63.0)	11.6 (52.9)	5.5 (41.9)	−0.5 (31.1)	−2.8 (27.0)	−3.9 (25.0)
Average precipitation mm (inches)	67.1 (2.64)	84.1 (3.31)	92.4 (3.64)	63.2 (2.49)	34.1 (1.34)	75.3 (2.96)	305.3 (12.02)	340.3 (13.40)	110.7 (4.36)	31.7 (1.25)	14.4 (0.57)	36.2 (1.43)	1,254.8 (49.41)
Average precipitation days	5	6	6	5	4	6	15	17	7	2	2	3	78
Source 1: Climate-Data.org, altitude: 497 m
Source 2: SCBM

=== Cityscape ===
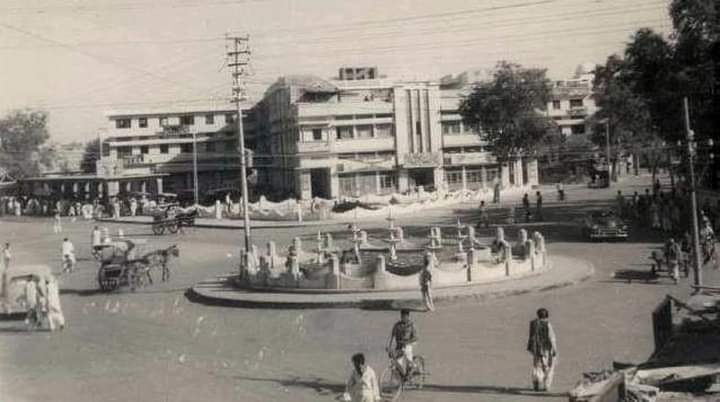
Fawara Chowk in 1940.

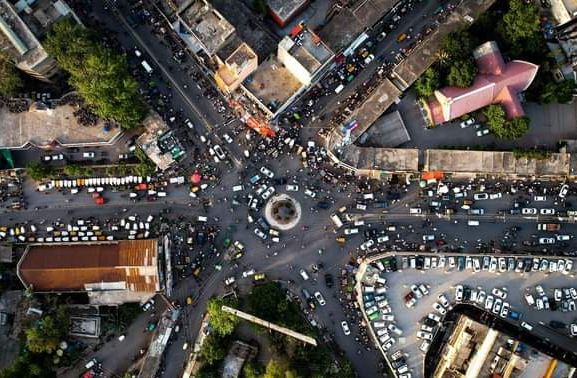
Fawara Chowk in 2021.

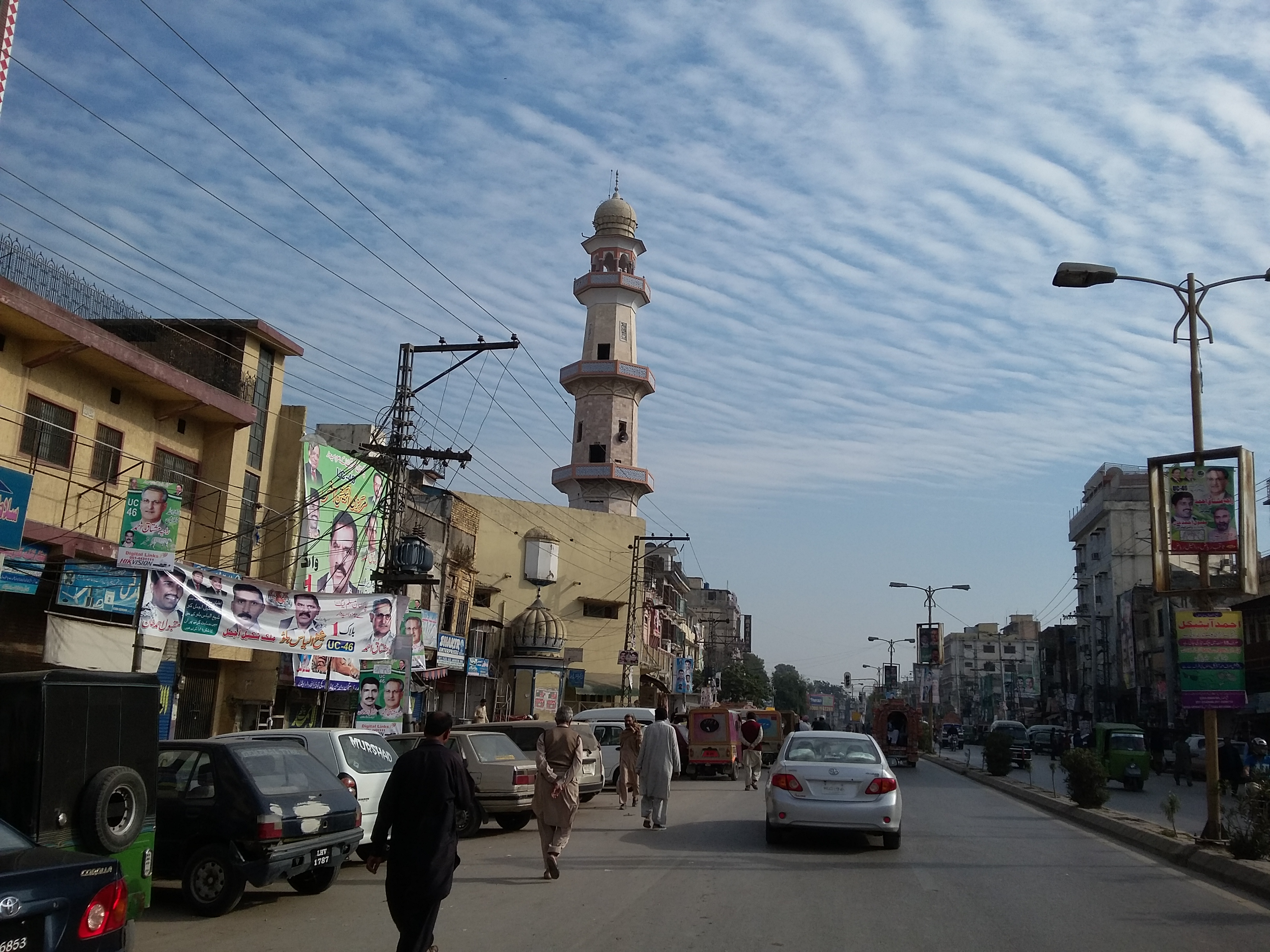
College Road is famous for electronic markets.

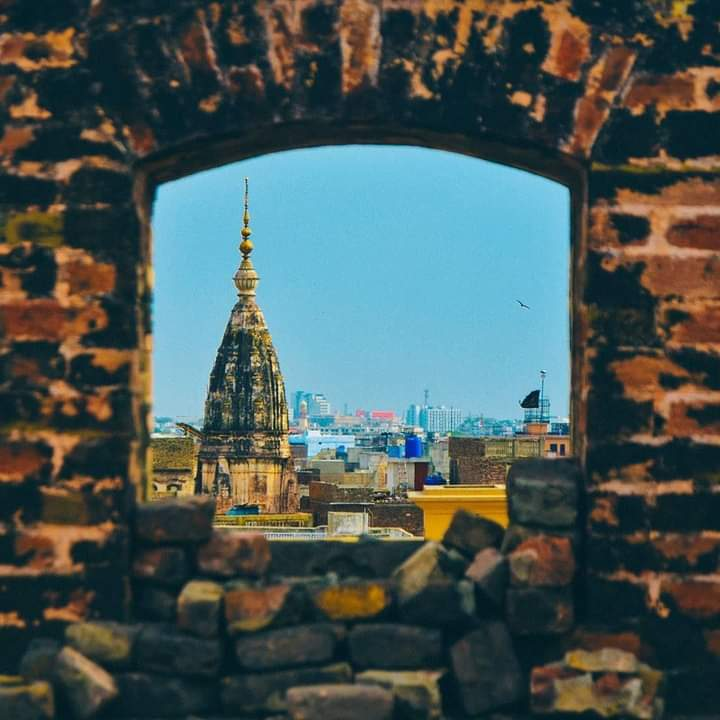
Haveli sujan Singh Rawalpindi

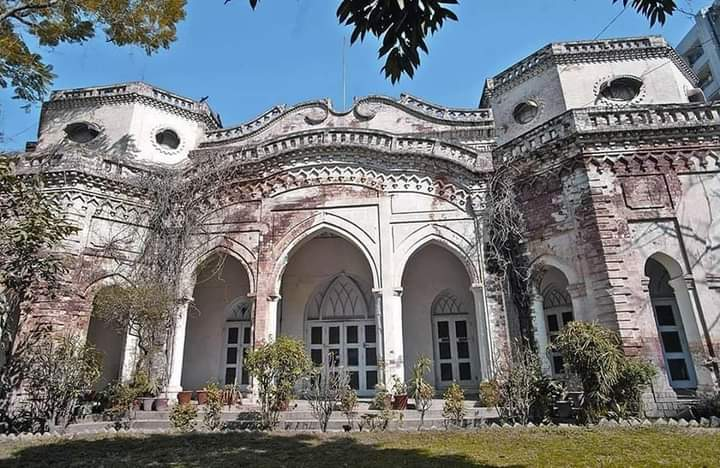
Poonch House Rawalpindi

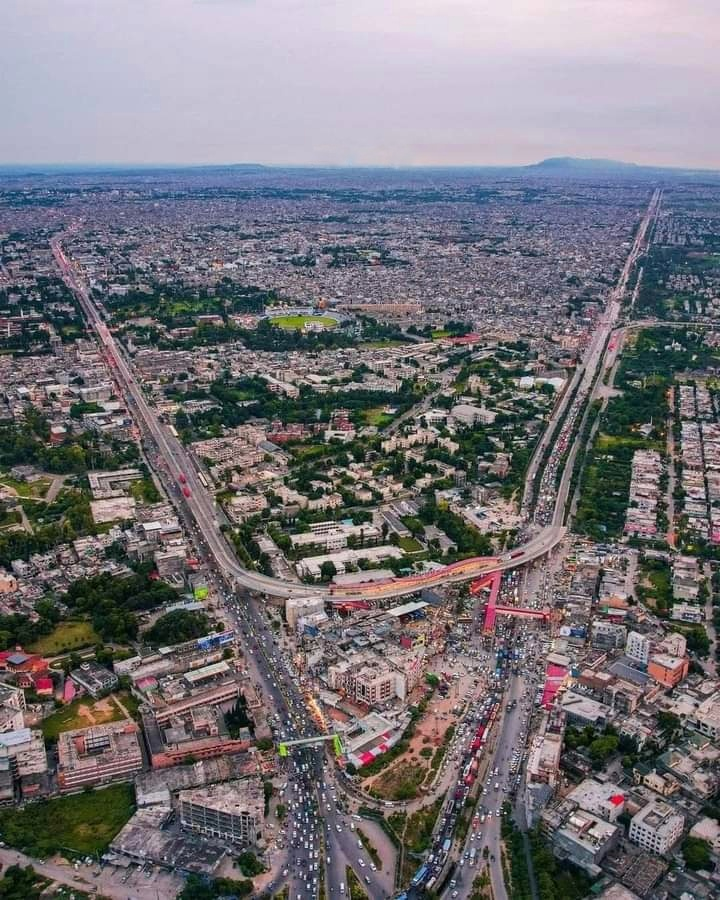
Faizabad Interchange

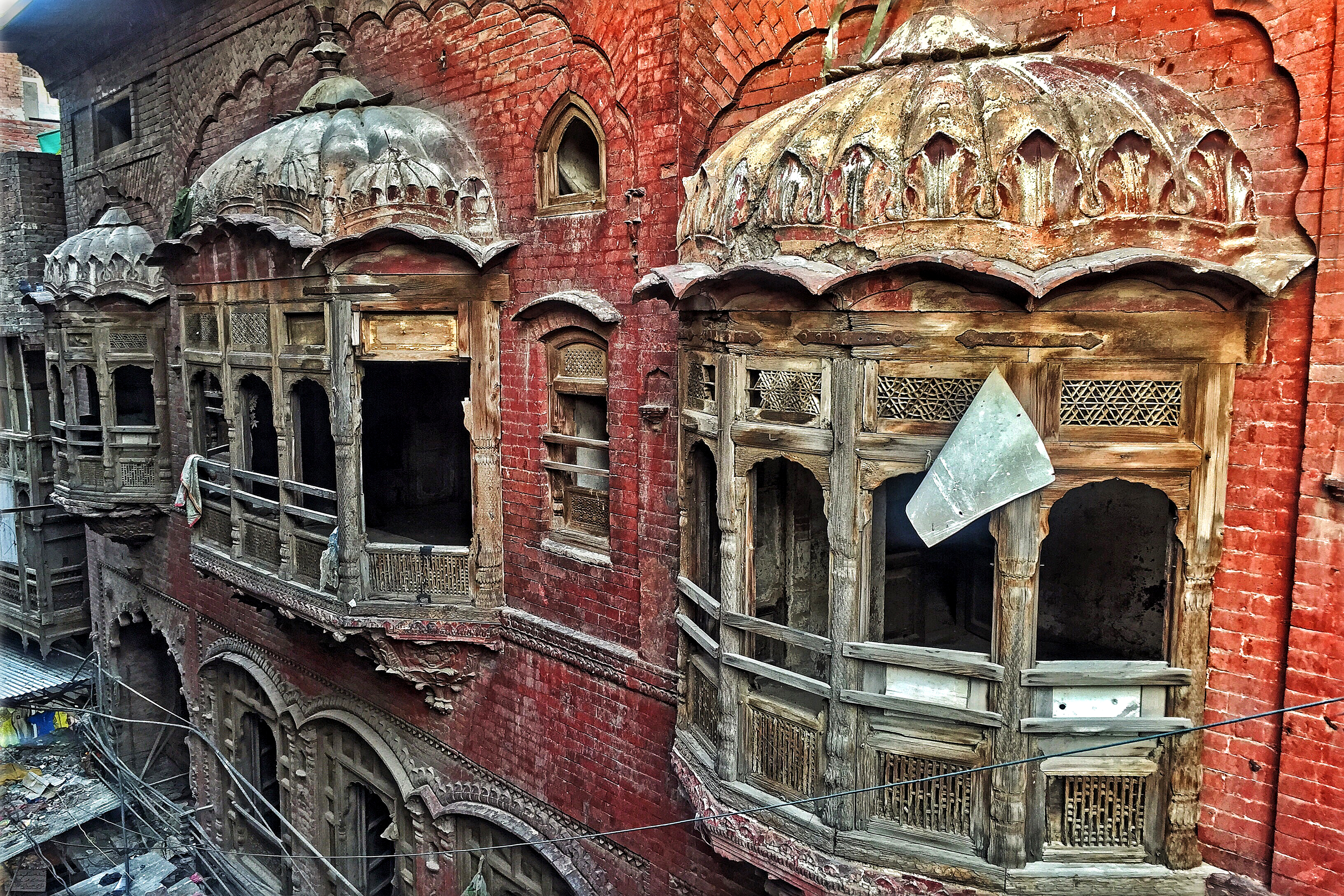
Lal Haveli

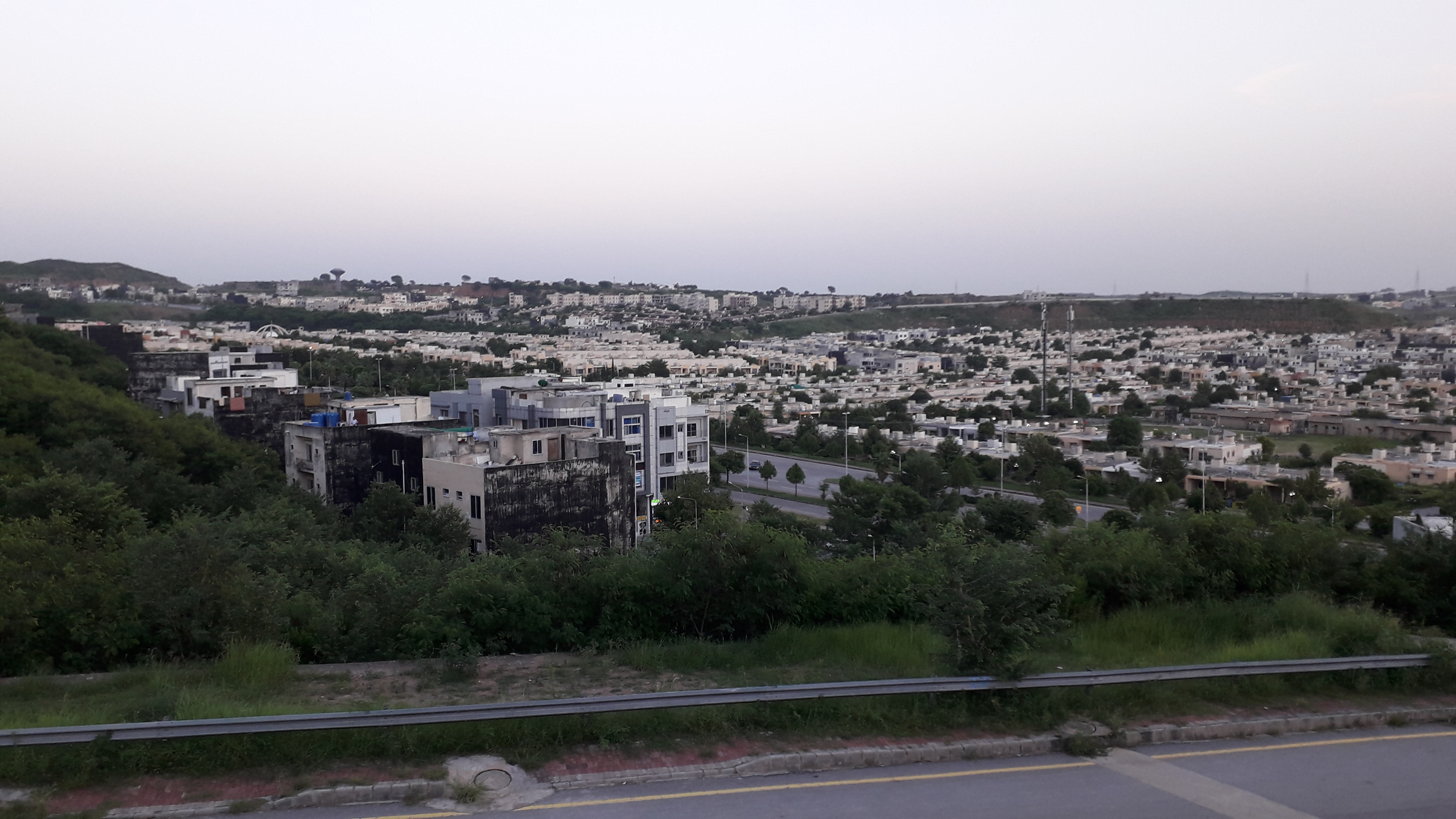
Bahria Town is a private housing scheme in Rawalpindi

Social structures in Rawalpindi's historic core centre around neighbourhoods, each known as a Mohallah. Each neighbourhood is served by a nearby bazaar (market) and mosque, which in turn serves as a place where people can gather for trade and manufacturing. Each Mohallah has narrow gallies (streets), and the grouping of houses around short lanes and cul-de-sacs lends a sense of privacy and security to residents of each neighbourhood. Major intersections in the neighbourhood are each referred to as a chowk.

Rawalpindi is relatively a new city contrasted with Pakistan's millennia-old cities such as Lahore, Multan, and Peshawar. South of Rawalpindi's historic core, and across the Lai Nullah, are the wide lanes of the Rawalpindi Cantonment. With tree-lined avenues and historic architecture, the cantonment was the main European area developed during British colonial rule. British colonialists also built the Saddar Bazaar south of the historic core, which served as a retail center geared towards Europeans in the city. Beyond the cantonment are the large suburban housing developments that serve as bedroom communities for Islamabad's commuter population.

== Demographics ==
Population

Historical population

Year	Pop.	±% p.a.
1855	15,913	—
1868	28,586	+4.61%
1881	52,975	+4.86%
1891	72,023	+3.12%
1901	87,688	+1.99%
1911	86,483	−0.14%
1921	101,142	+1.58%
1931	119,284	+1.66%

Year	Pop.	±% p.a.
1941	185,000	+4.49%
1951	237,000	+2.51%
1961	340,000	+3.67%
1972	615,000	+5.54%
1981	795,000	+2.89%
1998	1,409,768	+3.43%
2017	2,098,231	+2.12%
2023	3,357,612	+8.15%

According to the 2023 census, Rawalpindi population is 3,357,612.

Languages

Languages of Rawalpindi City (2023)
1. Punjabi (54.2%)
2. Urdu (25.1%)
3. Pashto (13.1%)
4. Hindko (2.81%)
5. Kashmiri (2.07%)
6. Saraiki (0.89%)
7. Sindhi (0.32%)
8. others (1.47%)

The population of Rawalpindi was 3,357,612 in 2023 of which 54.22% of spoke Punjabi as a first language, 25.14% spoke Urdu, 13.08% spoke Pashto, 2.81% spoke Hindko, 2.07% spoke Kashmiri, 0.89% Seraiki, 0.32% Sindhi and an additional diverse 1.47% spoke other languages of Pakistan (mostly Balti and Kohistani). (Note: Language percentages based on the urban population of Rawalpindi Tehsil which corresponds with the urban locality borders, Rawalpindi urban locality is also the only designated urban area in the Rawalpindi tehsil.)

=== Religion ===
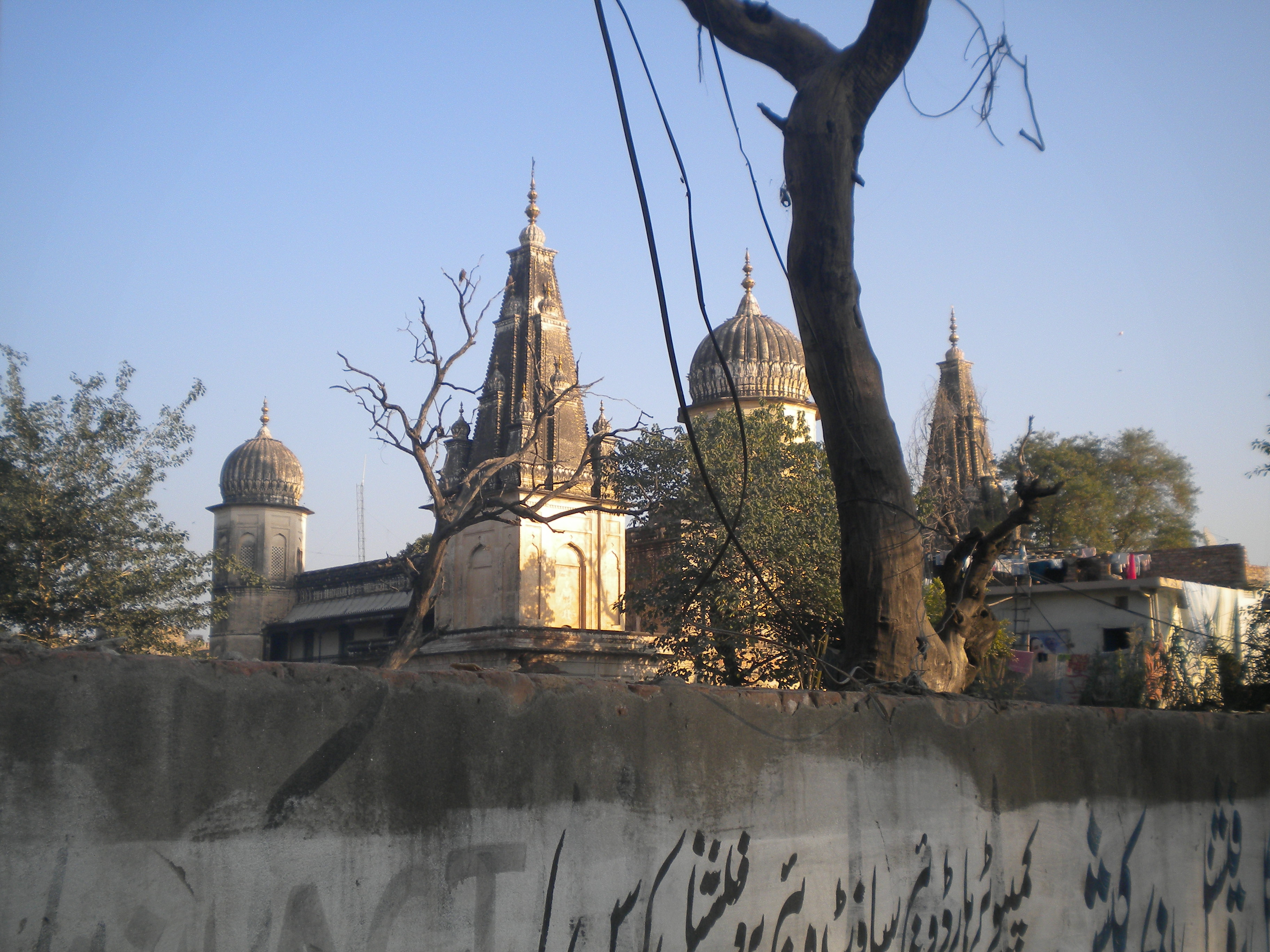
An abandoned Hindu Temple at Bagh Sardaran

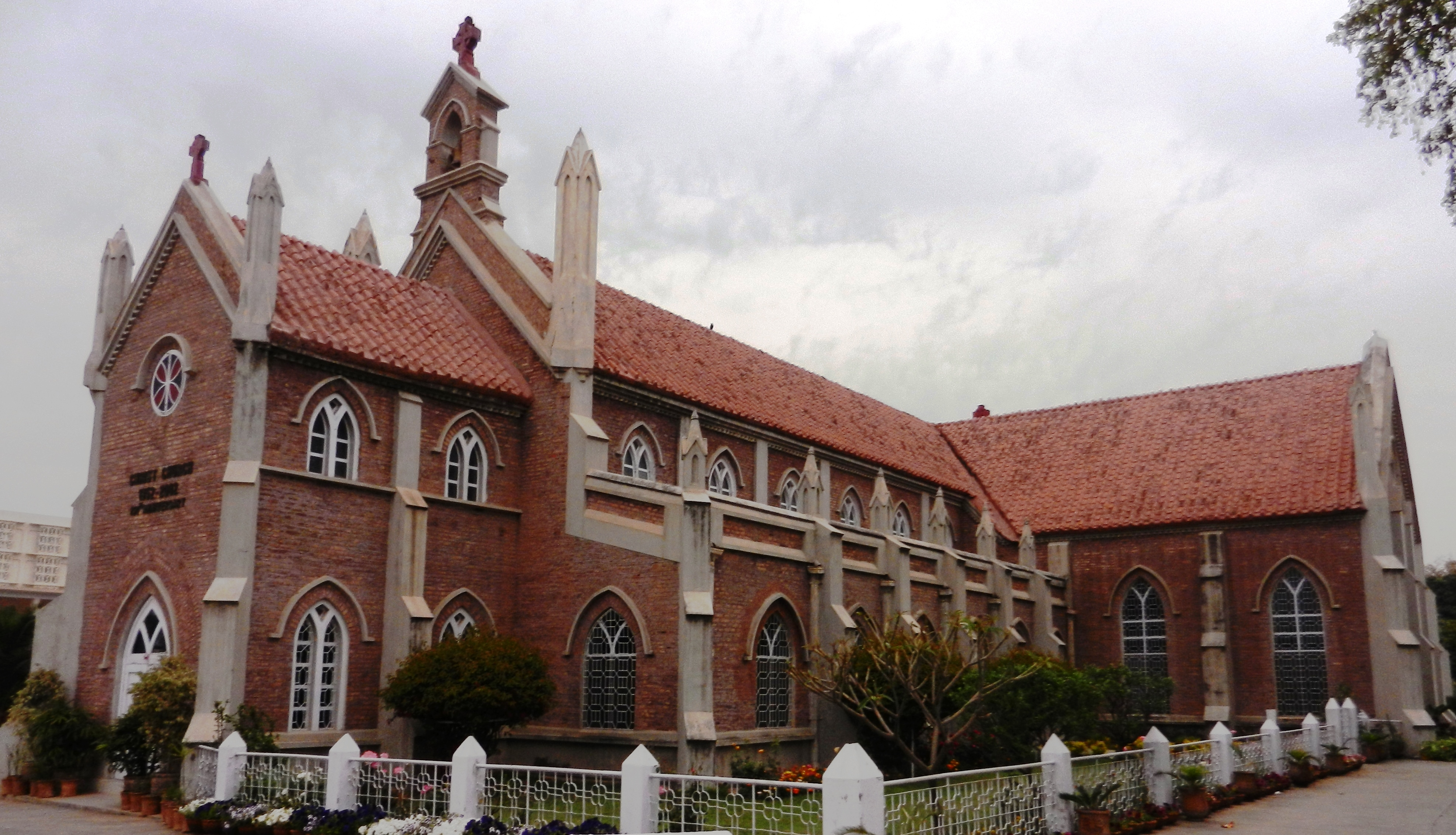
Christ Church, Rawalpindi

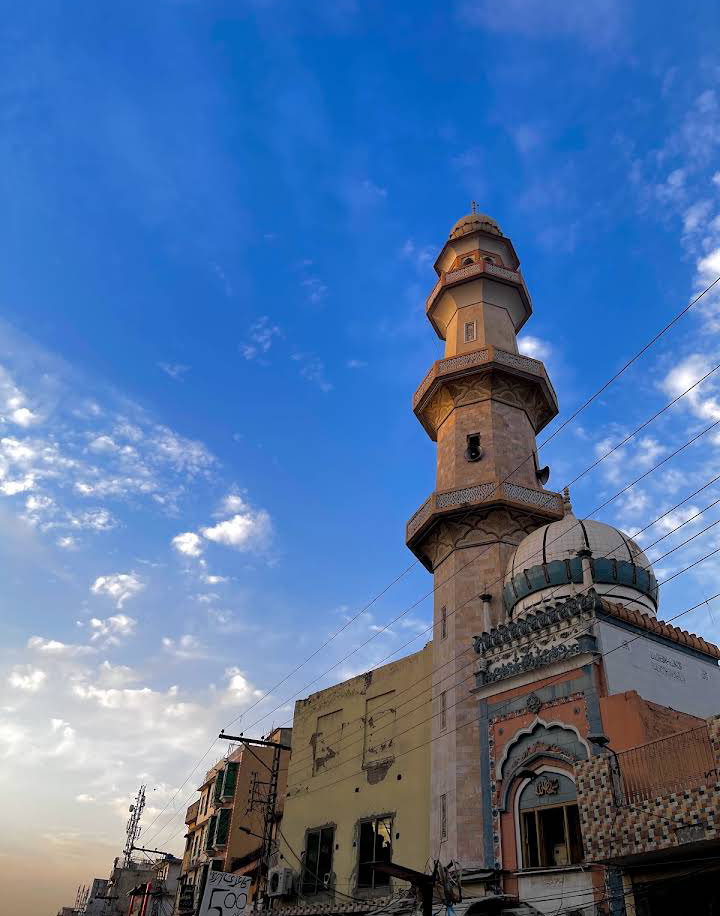
Moti Masjid

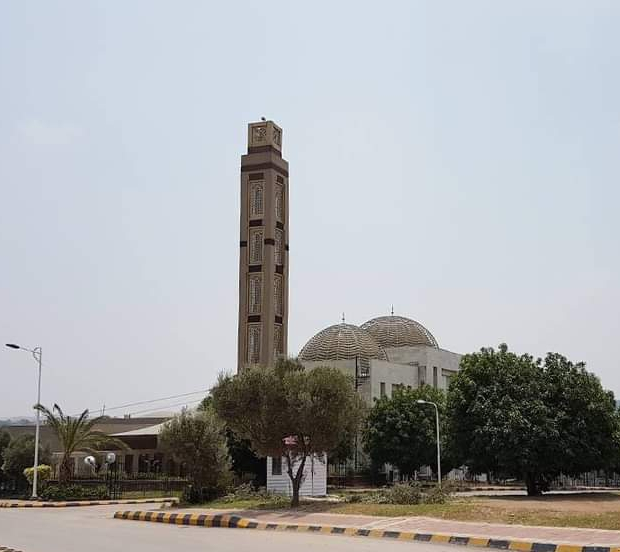
Fatima Masjid, Bahria Town

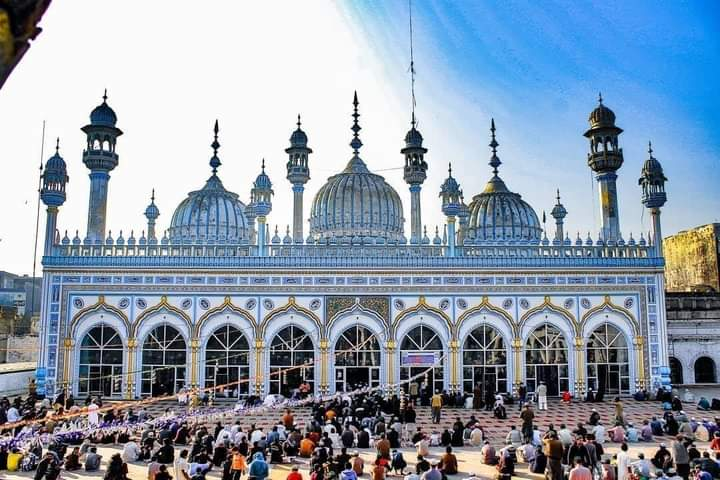
Markazi Jamia Masjid

96.7% of Rawalpindi's population is Muslim, 3.1% is Christian, 0.2% belong to other religious groups. The city's Kohaati Bazaar is site of large Shia mourning-processions for Ashura. The neighbourhoods of Waris Shah Mohallah and Pir Harra Mohallah form the core of Muslim settlement in Rawalpindi's old city.

Prior to partition there was a sizable Sikh and Hindu community living in Rawalpindi. Today, the city is still home to a few hundred Hindu families. Despite the fact that the vast majority of the city's Hindus fled en masse to India after Partition, most Hindu temples in the old city remain standing, although in disrepair and often abandoned. Many of the old city's neighbourhoods continue to bear Hindu and Sikh names, such as Krishanpura, Aria Mohallah, Akaal Garh, Mohanpura, Amarpura, Kartarpura, Bagh Sardaraan, Angatpura.

Rawalpindi was a majority Hindu and Sikh city prior to the Partition of India in 1947, combined composing 51.05 percent of the total population according to the 1941 census. The same census detailed Muslims as the largest single group who made up 43.79 percent of the total population. The Baba Dyal Singh Gurdwara in Rawalpindi was where the reformist Nirankari movement of Sikhism originated. The city still has a small Sikh population, but has been bolstered by the arrival of Sikhs fleeing political instability in Khyber Pakhtunkhwa.

There are 3 main active Hindu temples in the city- Shri Krishna Mandir in Saddar Cantonment, Lal Kurti Temple in Lal Kurti area, and the Valmiki Swamiji Mandir in Gracy lines. The Shri Krishna Mandir is the only major functional Hindu temple in Rawalpindi. It was built in the Kabarri Bazaar in 1897. Other temples are abandoned or were repurposed. Rawalpindi's large Kalyan Das Temple from 1880 has been used as the "Gov't. Qandeel Secondary School for the Blind" since 1973. The Ram Leela Temple in Kanak Mandi, and the Kaanji Mal Ujagar Mal Ram Richpal Temple in the Kabarri Bazaar, are both currently used to house Kashmiri refugees. Mohan Temple in the Lunda Bazaar remains standing, but is abandoned and the building no longer used for any purpose. The city's "Shamshan Ghat" serves as the city's cremation grounds, and was partly renovated in 2012.

The city's Babu Mohallah neighbourhood was once home to a community of Jewish traders who had fled Mashhad, Persia in the 1830s.

In the British era many churches were built for the British soldiers to come to the churches for Sunday prayer because Rawalpindi Cantonment was the home for the British Army.

Religious groups in Rawalpindi City (1881−2023) (Note: 1881–1941: Data for the entirety of the town of Rawalpindi, which included Rawalpindi Municipality and Rawalpindi Cantonment. 2017–2023: Urban population of Rawalpindi Tehsil.)
Religious group	1881		1891		1901		1911		1921		1931		1941		2017		2023	
Religious group	Pop.	%	Pop.	%	Pop.	%	Pop.	%	Pop.	%	Pop.	%	Pop.	%	Pop.	%	Pop.	%
Islam	23,664	44.67%	32,787	44.43%	40,807	46.54%	40,678	47.04%	47,653	47.11%	55,637	46.64%	81,038	43.79%	2,029,304	96.73%	3,207,449	97.09%
Hinduism (Note: 1931–1941: Including Ad-Dharmis)	23,419	44.21%	29,264	39.66%	33,227	37.89%	29,106	33.66%	35,279	34.88%	40,161	33.67%	62,394	33.72%	628	0.03%	843	0.03%
Sikhism	1,919	3.62%	4,767	6.46%	6,302	7.19%	8,306	9.6%	9,144	9.04%	15,532	13.02%	32,064	17.33%	—N/a	—N/a	118	0%
Jainism	904	1.71%	848	1.15%	1,008	1.15%	963	1.11%	916	0.91%	1,025	0.86%	1,301	0.7%	—N/a	—N/a	—N/a	—N/a
Christianity	—N/a	—N/a	6,072	8.23%	6,275	7.16%	7,846	9.07%	8,111	8.02%	6,850	5.74%	3,668	1.98%	65,729	3.13%	92,906	2.81%
Zoroastrianism	—N/a	—N/a	51	0.07%	65	0.07%	58	0.07%	39	0.04%	65	0.05%	—N/a	—N/a	—N/a	—N/a	21	0%
Judaism	—N/a	—N/a	2	0%	—N/a	—N/a	16	0.02%	0	0%	5	0%	—N/a	—N/a	—N/a	—N/a	—N/a	—N/a
Buddhism	—N/a	—N/a	0	0%	0	0%	10	0.01%	0	0%	9	0.01%	—N/a	—N/a	—N/a	—N/a	—N/a	—N/a
Ahmadiyya	—N/a	—N/a	—N/a	—N/a	—N/a	—N/a	—N/a	—N/a	—N/a	—N/a	—N/a	—N/a	—N/a	—N/a	1,848	0.09%	1,651	0.05%
Others	3,069	5.79%	4	0.01%	1	0%	0	0%	0	0%	0	0%	4,587	2.48%	315	0.02%	733	0.02%
Total population	52,975	100%	73,795	100%	87,688	100%	86,483	100%	101,142	100%	119,284	100%	185,042	100%	2,097,824	100%	3,303,721	100%

== Transportation ==
=== Public transportation ===
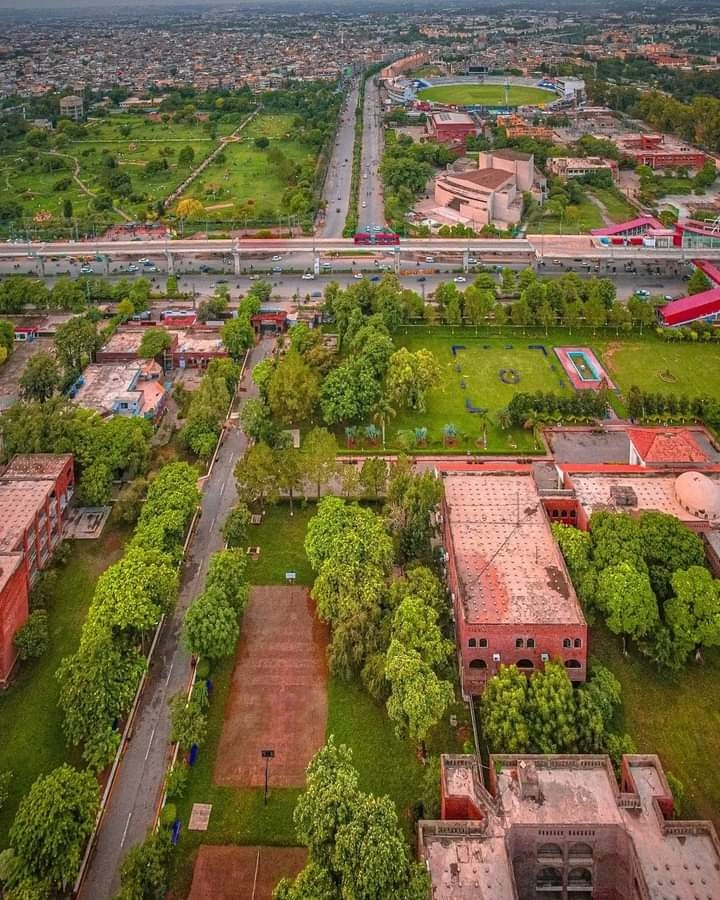
A Double road in Rawalpindi

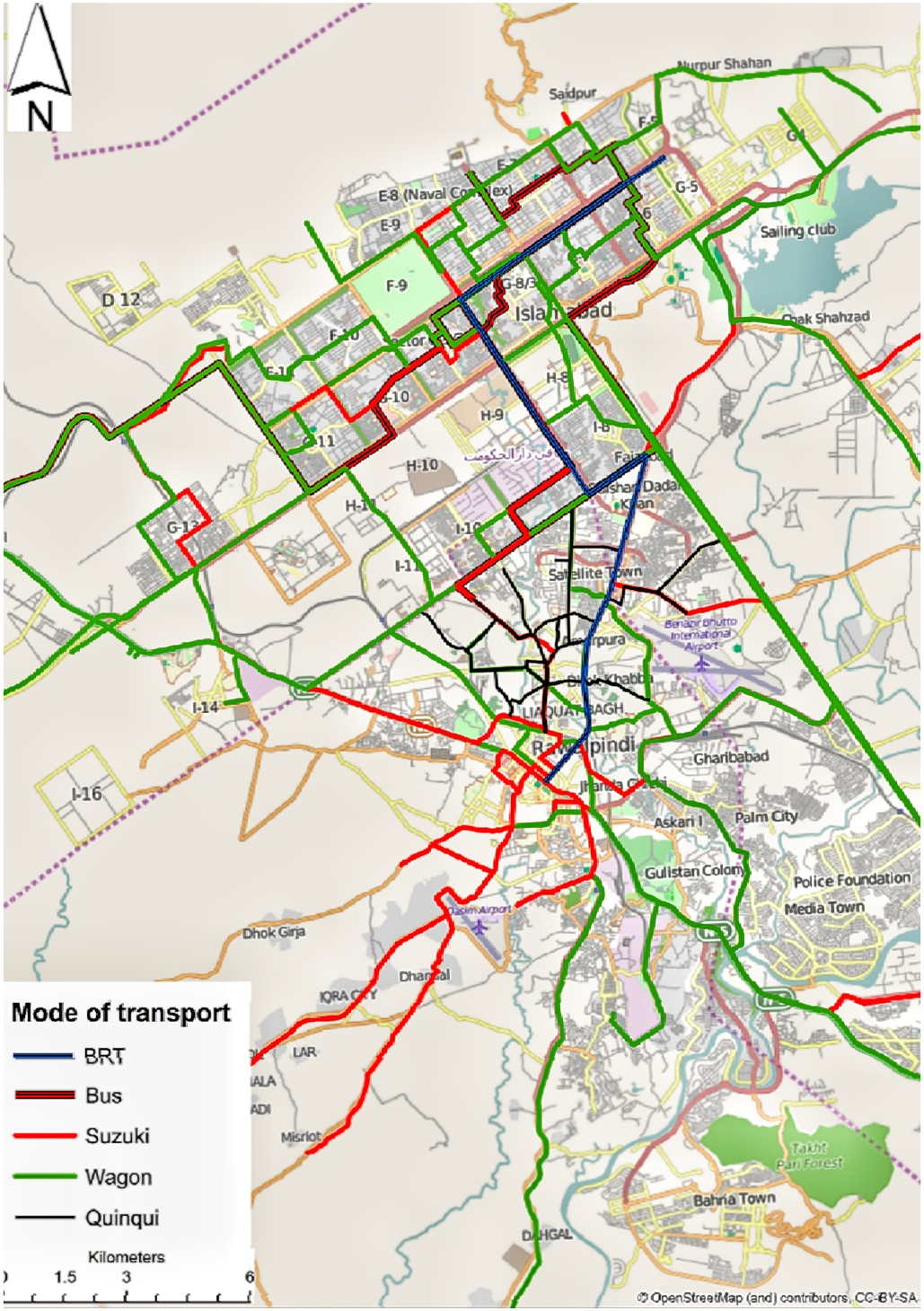
Map of Pindi-Islamabad public transport

The Rawalpindi-Islamabad Metrobus is a 48.1 km (29.9 mi) bus rapid transit system operating in the Islamabad-Rawalpindi metropolitan area. The Metrobus network's first phase was opened on 4 June 2015, and stretches 22.5 kilometres between Pak Secretariat, in Islamabad, and Saddar in Rawalpindi. The second stage stretches 25.6 kilometres between the Peshawar Morr Interchange and New Islamabad International Airport and was inaugurated on 18 April 2022. The system uses e-ticketing and an Intelligent Transportation System and is managed by the Punjab Mass Transit Authority.

The Rawalpindi Green Electric Bus Service, launched in November 2025, operates on key city routes for providing free travel for women, students, and senior citizens covering four main routes, including Saddar to Qabristan Chowk, Fawara Chowk to Koral Chowk, and others connecting major areas such as Mall Road and Peshawar Road which is expanding the facilitation to all other routes.

=== Road ===
Rawalpindi is situated along the historic Grand Trunk Road that connects Peshawar to Islamabad and Lahore. The road is roughly paralleled by the M-1 Motorway between Peshawar and Rawalpindi, while the M-2 Motorway provides an alternate route to Lahore via the Salt Range. The Grand Trunk Road also provides access to the Afghan border via the Khyber Pass, with onwards connections to Kabul and Central Asia via the Salang Pass. The Karakoram Highway provides access between Islamabad and western China, and an alternate route to Central Asia via Kashgar in the Chinese region of Xinjiang.

The Islamabad Expressway connects Rawalpindi's eastern portions with the Rawal Lake and heart of Islamabad. The IJP Road separates Rawalpindi's northern edge from Islamabad.

=== Motorways ===
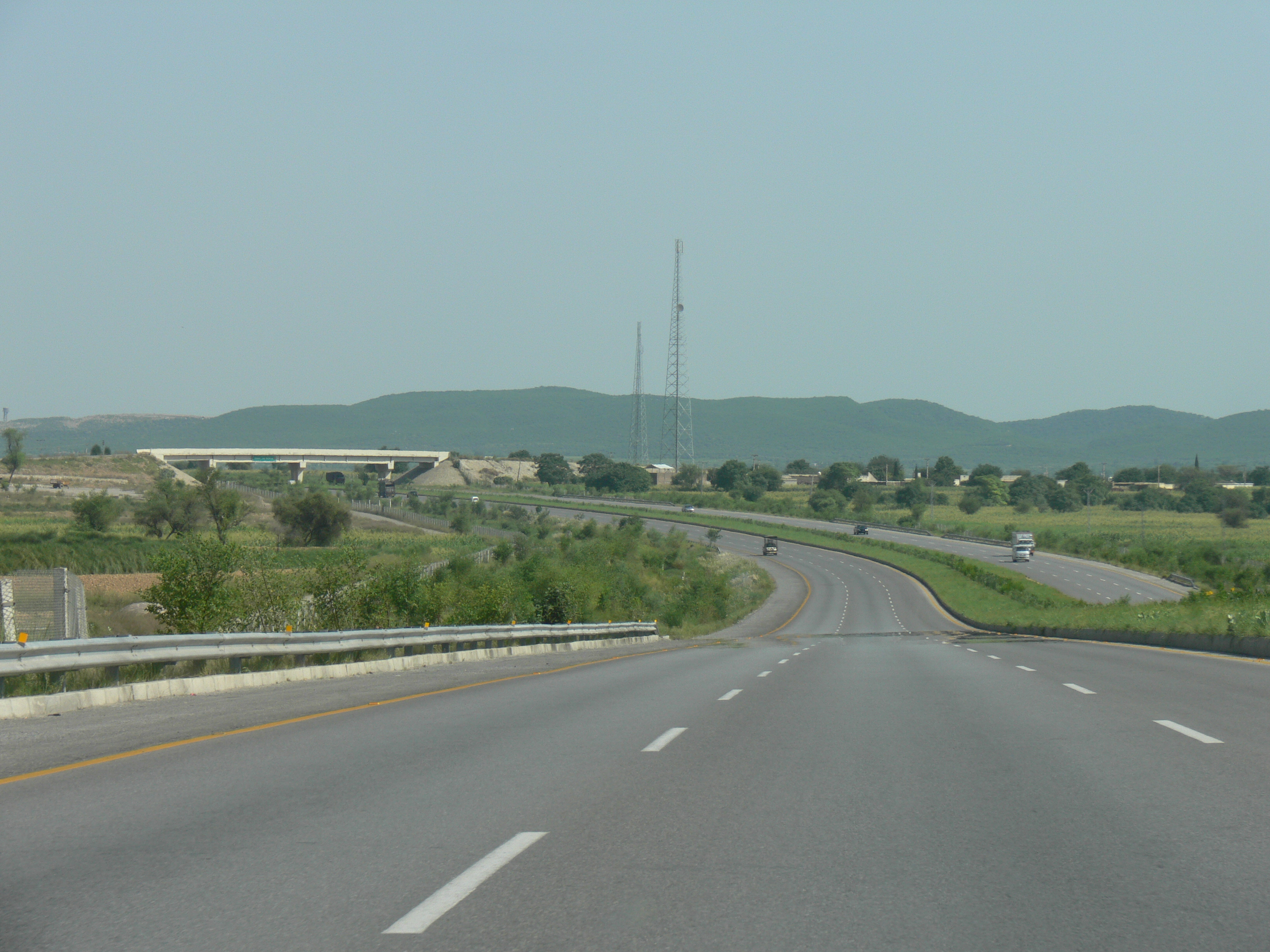
The M-2 motorway connects Rawalpindi to Lahore, and is part of a network of motorways under construction that will continue to the port city of Karachi.

Rawalpindi is connected to Peshawar by the M-1 Motorway. The motorway also links Rawalpindi to major cities in the Khyber Pakhtunkhwa province, such as Charsadda and Mardan. The M-2 motorway offers high speed access to Lahore via the Potohar Plateau and Salt Range. The M-3 Motorway branches off from the M-2 at the city of Pindi Bhattian, where the M-3 offers onward connections to Faisalabad, and connects to the M-4 Motorway which continues onward to Multan and from there onwards to Sukkur. A new motorway network is under construction to connect Sukkur and Karachi as part of the China Pakistan Economic Corridor. The Hazara Motorway is also under construction as part of CPEC, and will provide control-access motorway travel all the way to Mansehra via the M-1 or Grand Trunk Road.

=== Rail ===
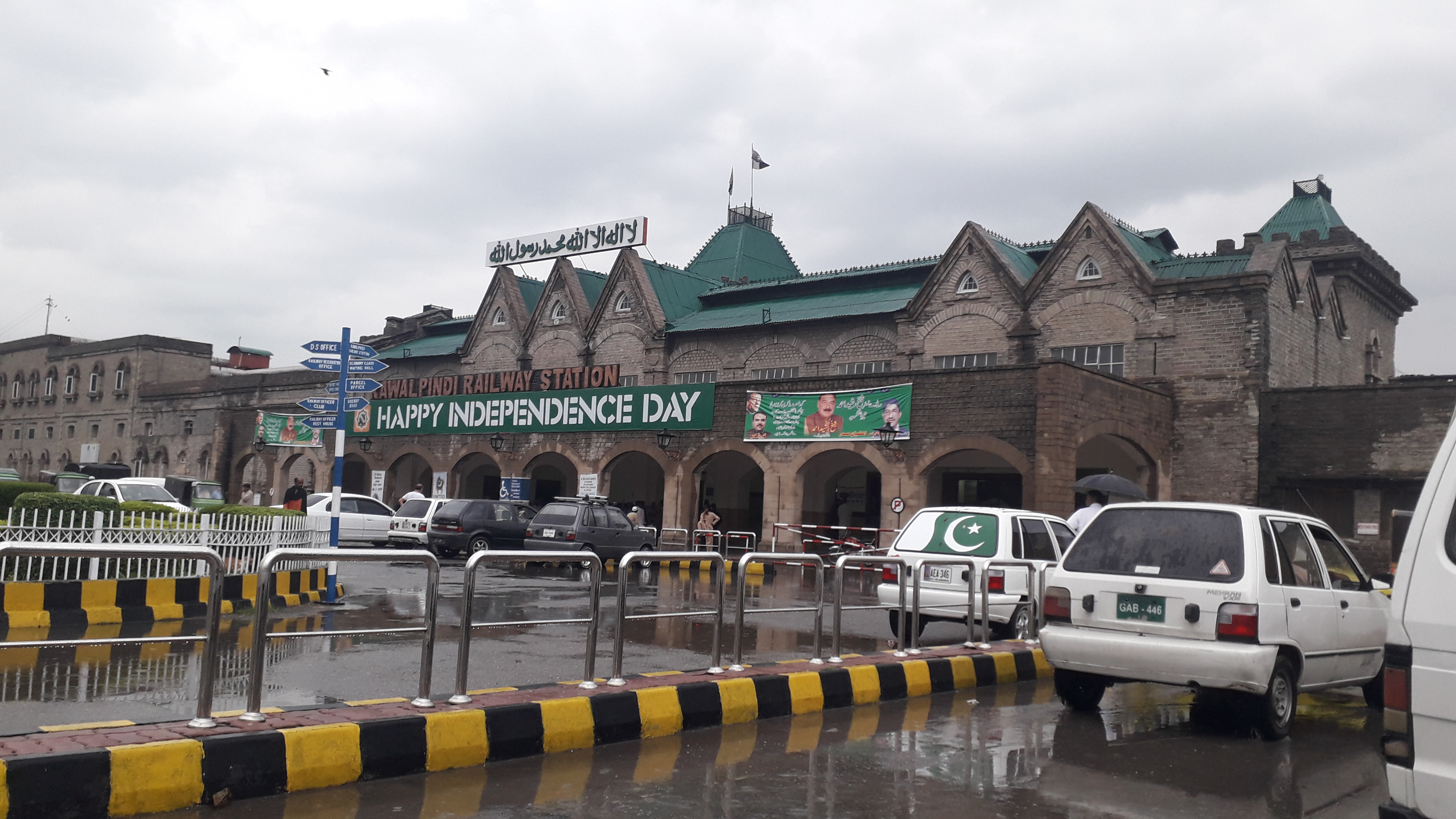
Rawalpindi Railway Station

Rawalpindi railway station in the Saddar neighbourhood serves as a stop along Pakistan's 1,687 kilometres (1,048 mi)-long Main Line-1 railway that connects the city to the port city of Karachi to Peshawar. The stations is served by the Awam Express, Hazara Express, Islamabad Express, Jaffar Express, Khyber Mail trains, and serves as the terminus for the Margalla Express, Mehr Express, Rawal Express, Pakistan Express, Subak Raftar Express, Green Line Express, Sir Syed Express, Subak Kharam Express and Tezgam trains.

The entire Main Line-1 railway track between Karachi and Peshawar is to be overhauled at a cost of $3.65 billion for the first phase of the project, with completion by 2021. Upgrading of the railway line will permit train travel at speeds of 160 kilometres per hour, versus the average 60 to 105 km per hour speed currently possible on existing track.

=== Air ===
Rawalpindi is served by the Islamabad International Airport. The airport is located 21 km west of the city. It offers non-stop flights throughout Pakistan, as well as to the Middle East, Europe, North America, Central Asia, East Asia and Southeast Asia.

== Development Project ==
=== Rawalpindi Ring Road ===
The Rawalpindi Ring Road (RRR) is a 38.3 km, 6-lane controlled-access highway project, aimed at bypassing city traffic from Banth (N-5) to Thalian (M-2). Key developments include 12 bridges, 11 overpasses, and 10 subways, to boost economic activity and real estate in the region.

=== Kutchery Chowk Remodelling ===
The Kutchery Chowk Remodelling Project, a crucial Rs. 14–19 billion initiative in Rawalpindi, aims to resolve chronic traffic congestion by building a signal-free corridor with flyovers and underpasses. It connects key routes including GT Road, Jhelum Road, and Saddar, improving traffic flow for over 200,000 daily vehicles. New underpasses are planned at Race Course Park, Army Graveyard Square, and Chairing Cross, complementing the Kutchery Chowk project.

=== Dadocha Dam project ===
The Dadocha Dam project, a major initiative to resolve Rawalpindi's water scarcity, is construction of Dam to meet the needs of the citizens of Rawalpindi. Located 25 km from Rawalpindi, the Rs52.7B+ project with a supply of 35 MGD of water, include a recreation park, and create a migratory bird habitat.

== Administrative divisions ==
The city of Rawalpindi is one of five tehsils (sub-districts) of Rawalpindi District. The city is sub-divided between a Metropolitan Corporation, two Cantonment Boards (or military towns), and a number of rural union councils (the lowest level of local government in Pakistan), the latter of which are directly governed by the Rawalpindi district council. The Metropolitan Corporation includes 78 urban union councils.

Sr.	Component	Area (km^{2})	Population (2023)
1	Rawalpindi Metropolitan Corporation	Not available	2,284,014
2	Rawalpindi Cantonment	41.16	740,483
3	Chaklala Cantonment	34.01	333,115
4	Rural union councils	Not available	386,978

The metropolitan area includes many private housing developments (or "colonies") that have largely developed themselves rapidly. They include Gulraiz Housing Society, Korang Town, Agochs Town, Ghori Town, Pakistan Town, Judicial Town, Bahria Town Kashmir Housing Society, Danial Town, Al-Haram City, Education City, Gul Afshan Colony, and Allama Iqbal Colony.

== Parks ==
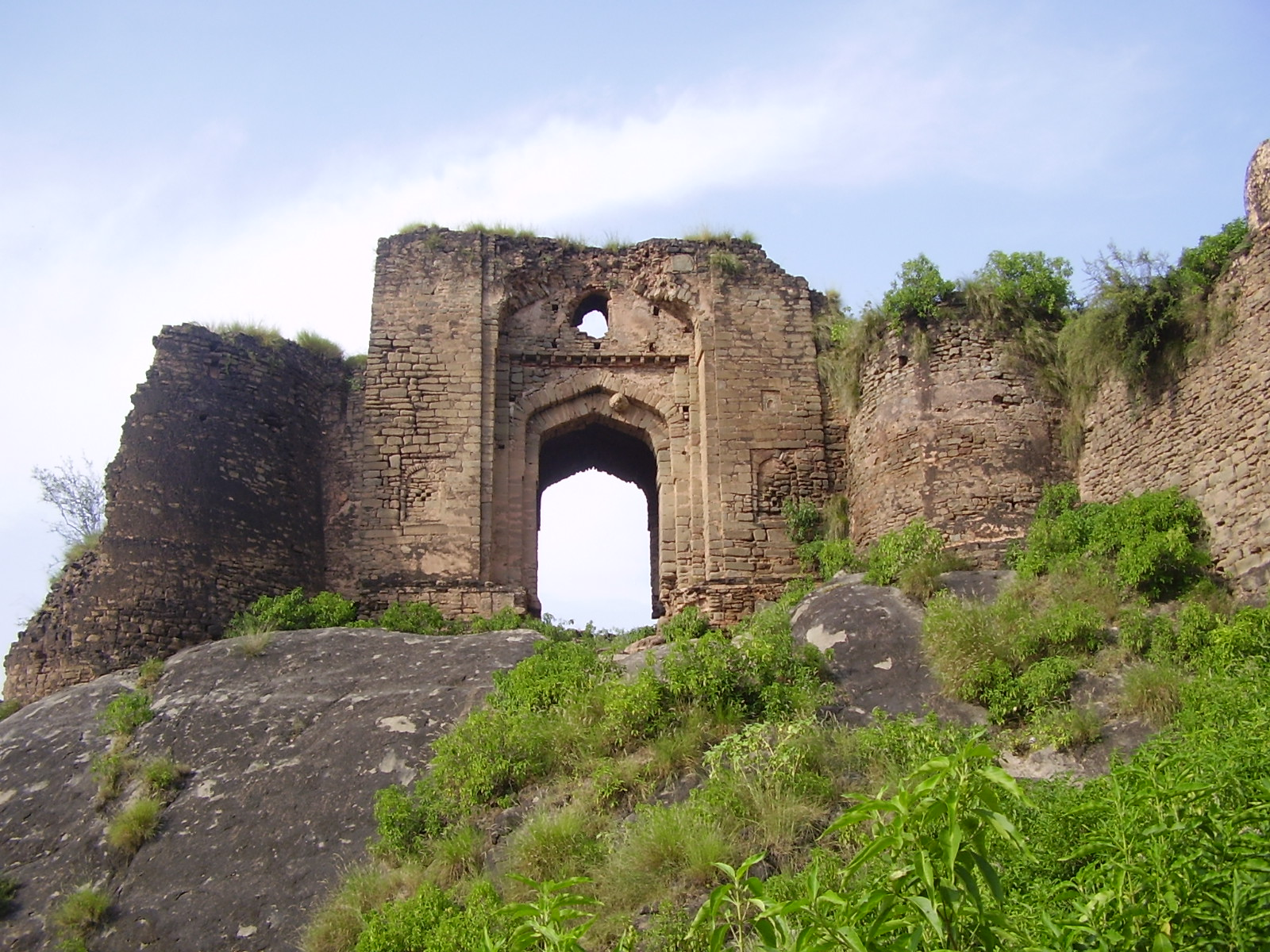
The gate of Paharwala Fort.

Ayub National Park is located beyond the old Presidency on Jhelum Road. It covers an area of about 2,300 acres (930 ha) and has a playland, lake with boating facility, an aquarium and a garden-restaurant. Rawalpindi Public Park is on Murree Road near Shamsabad. The Park was opened to the public in 1991. It has a playland for children, grassy lawns, fountains and flower beds.

In 2008 Jinnah Park was inaugurated at the heart of Rawalpindi and has since become a hotspot of activity for the city. It houses a state-of-the-art cinema, Cinepax, a Metro Cash and Carry supermart, an outlet of McDonald's, gaming lounges, Motion Rides and other recreational facilities. The vast lawns also provide an adequate picnic spot.

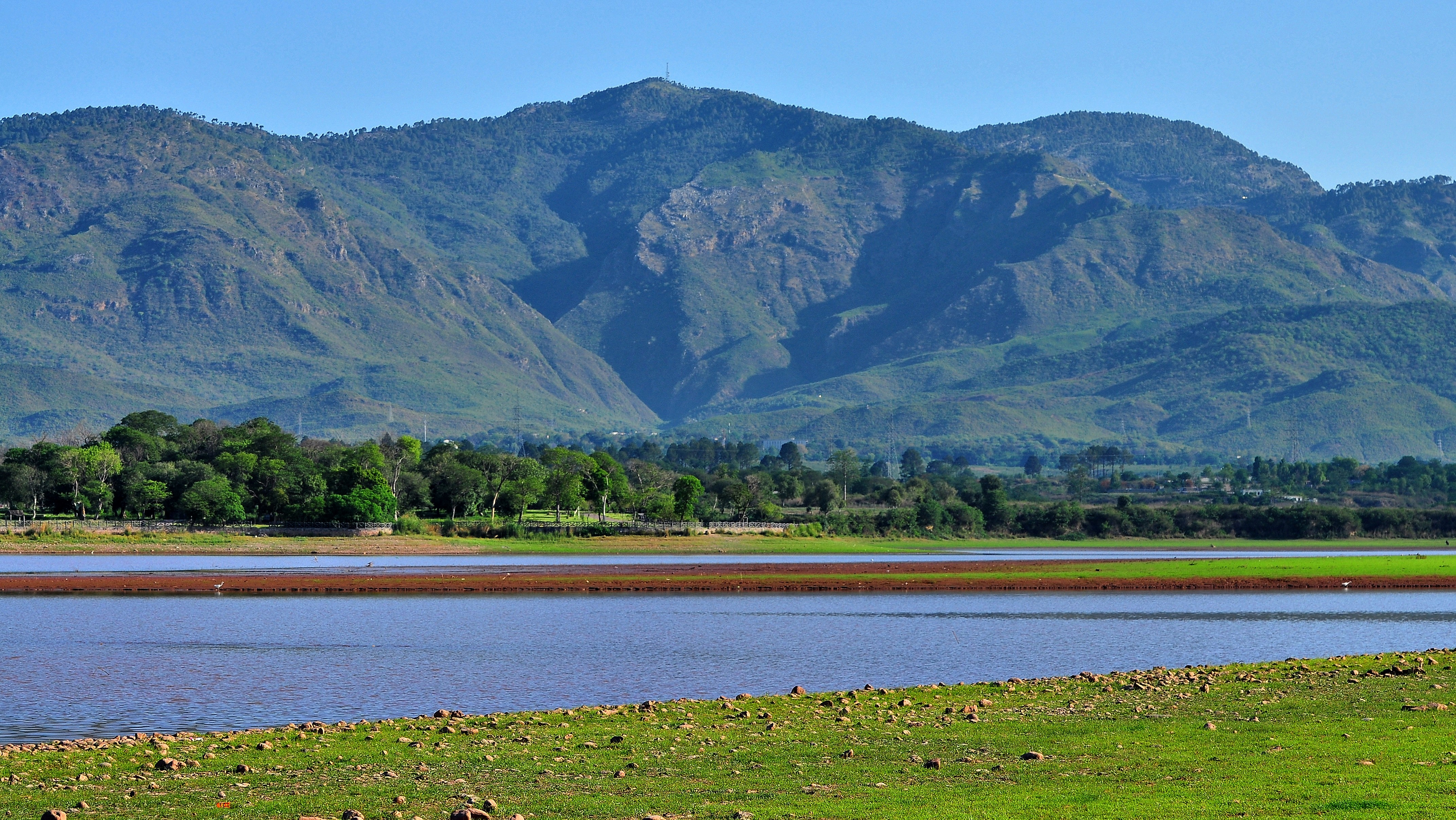
A view of Rawal Lake

Rawalpindi is situated near the Ayub National Park formerly known as 'Topi Rakh' (keep the hat on) is by the old Presidency, between the Murree Brewery Co. and Grand Trunk Road. It covers an area of about 2,300 acres (930 ha) and has a play area, lake with boating facility, an aquarium, a garden-restaurant and an open-air theater. This park hosts "The Jungle Kingdom" which is particularly popular among young residents.

- Liaquat Bagh, formerly known as the "company bagh" (East India Company's Garden), is of great historical interest. The first prime minister of Pakistan, Liaquat Ali Khan, was assassinated here in 1950. Pakistan's Prime Minister Benazir Bhutto was assassinated here on 27 December 2007. She was the youngest and the only woman to be elected as Prime Minister of Pakistan.
- Rawalpindi Public Park (previously Nawaz Sharif Park, renamed Iqbal Park in 2019) is located on Murree Road just opposite to the Pir Mehr Ali Shah Arid Agriculture University Rawalpindi. The park was opened in 1991. It has a play area for children, lawns, fountains and flower beds. A cricket stadium was built in 1992 opposite the public park. Several matches in the 1996 World Cup were held on this cricket ground.

== Education ==
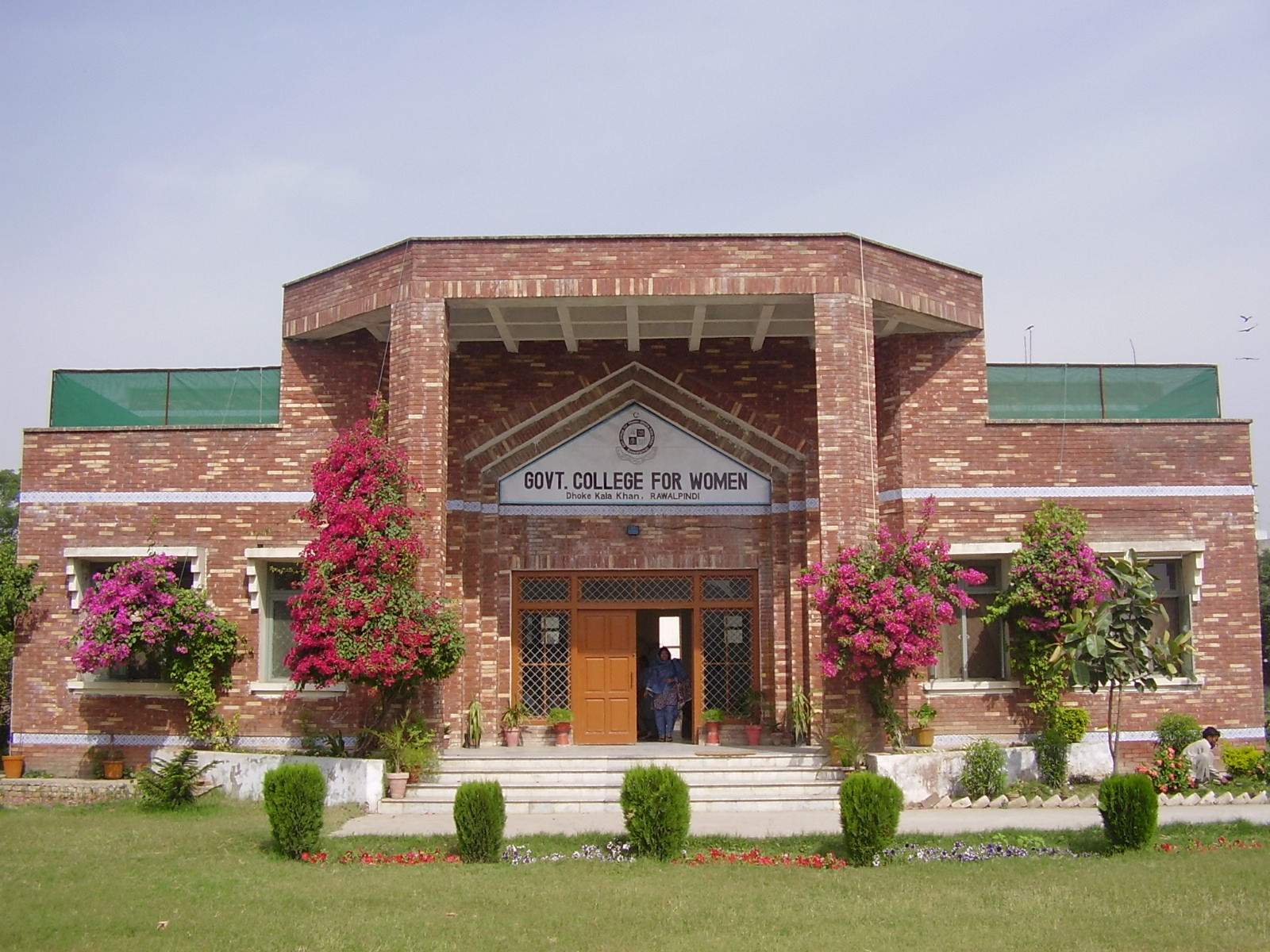
Govt College for Women

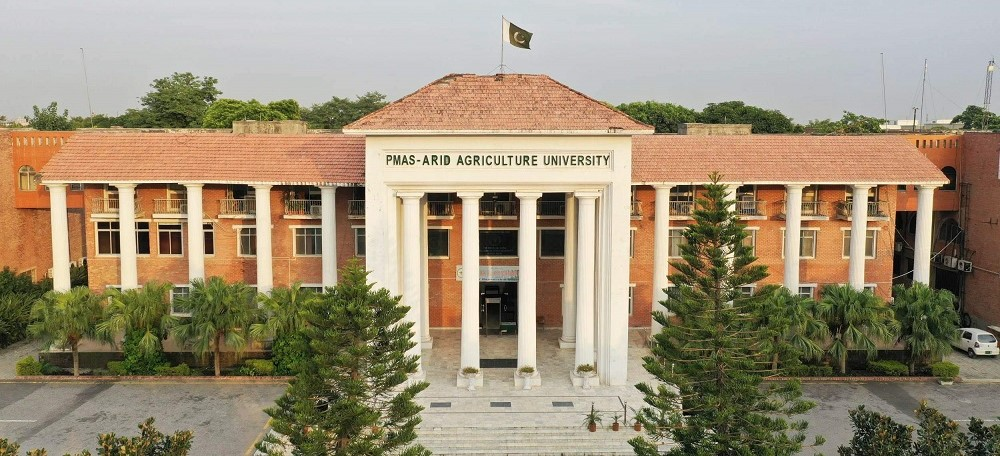
ARID Agriculture University

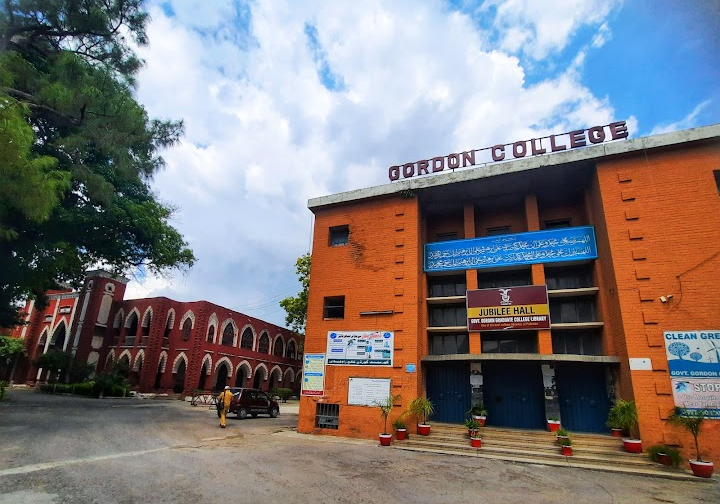
Gordon college

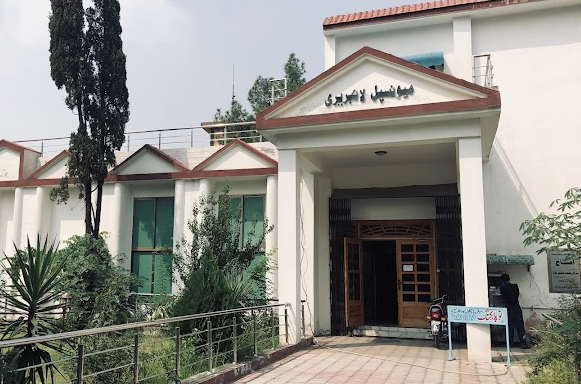
Municipal library, Rawalpindi

Rawalpindi District is home to 2,463 government public schools, out of which 1706 are primary schools, 306 middle schools, 334 are high schools, while 117 are higher education colleges.

97.4% of children ages 6–16 in urban areas of Rawalpindi District are enrolled in school – the third highest percentage in Pakistan after Islamabad and Karachi. 77.1% of Rawalpindi's students in Class 5 are able to read sentences in English. 27% of children in Rawalpindi attend paid private schools.

- College of Electrical & Mechanical Engineering is located on Grand Trunk Road in Rawalpindi, EME is the largest constituent college of NUST.
- Fatima Jinnah Women University The first ever Women University of Pakistan that was established in 1998.
- Foundation University RWP Campus located in new Lalazar alongside FFCB. They offer mainly IT and Biotech related courses such as Phd in Computer Science etc.

== Media ==
Rawalpindi, being so close to the capital, has an active media and newspaper climate. There are over a dozen of newspaper companies based in the city including Daily Nawa-i-Waqt, Daily Jang, Daily Asas, The Daily Sada-e-Haq, Daily Express, Daily Din, Daily Aajkal Rawalpindi, Daily Islam, and Daily Pakistan in Urdu and Dawn, Express Tribune, Daily Times, The News International and The Nation in English.

There are a large number of Cable TV service providers in the city such as Nayatel, PTCL, SA Cable Network and DWN. Pakistan Broadcasting Corporation has a centre in Rawalpindi.

== Recreation ==
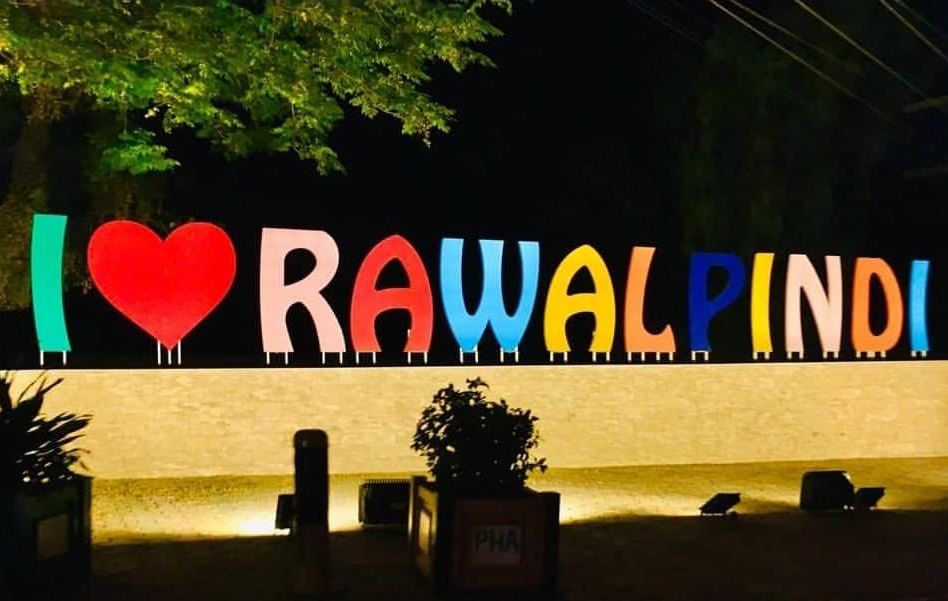
I Love Rawalpindi signboard outside Punjab House.

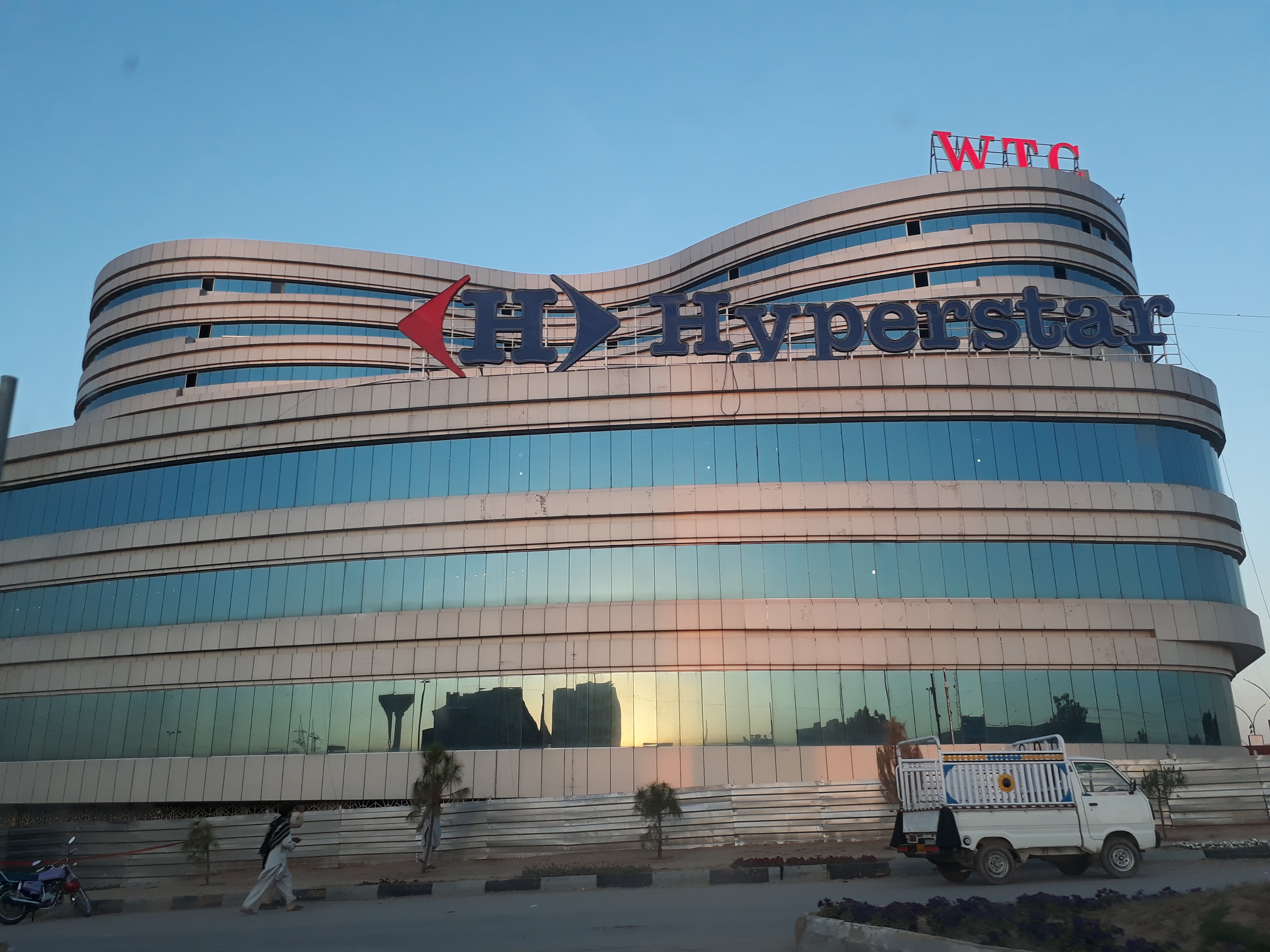
Giga Mall is one of the largest malls in Rawalpindi

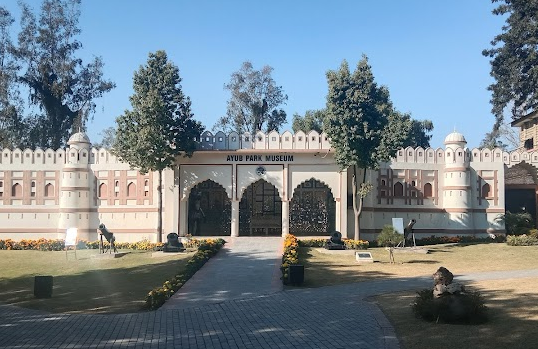
Ayub park Rawalpindi museum

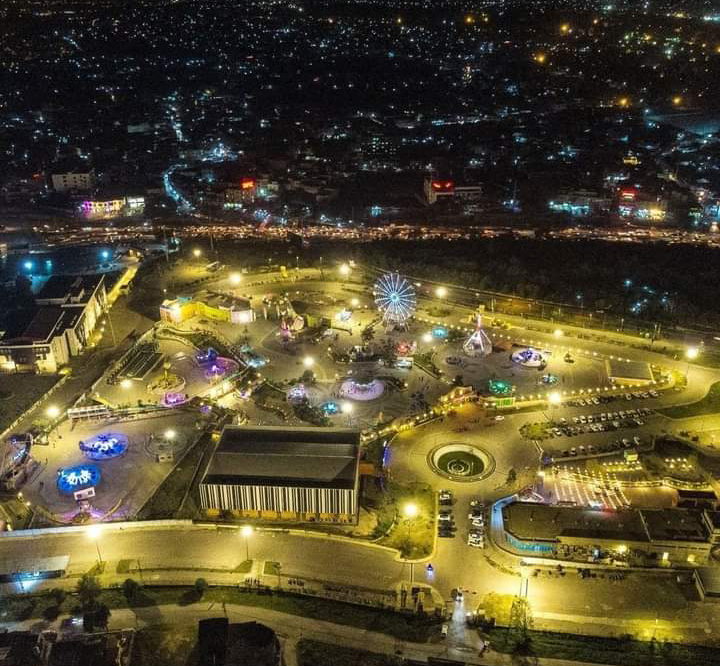
Night view of Joyland Rawalpindi

In mid-2012 3D cinema, The Arena, started its operations in Bahria Town Phase-4 in Rawalpindi.

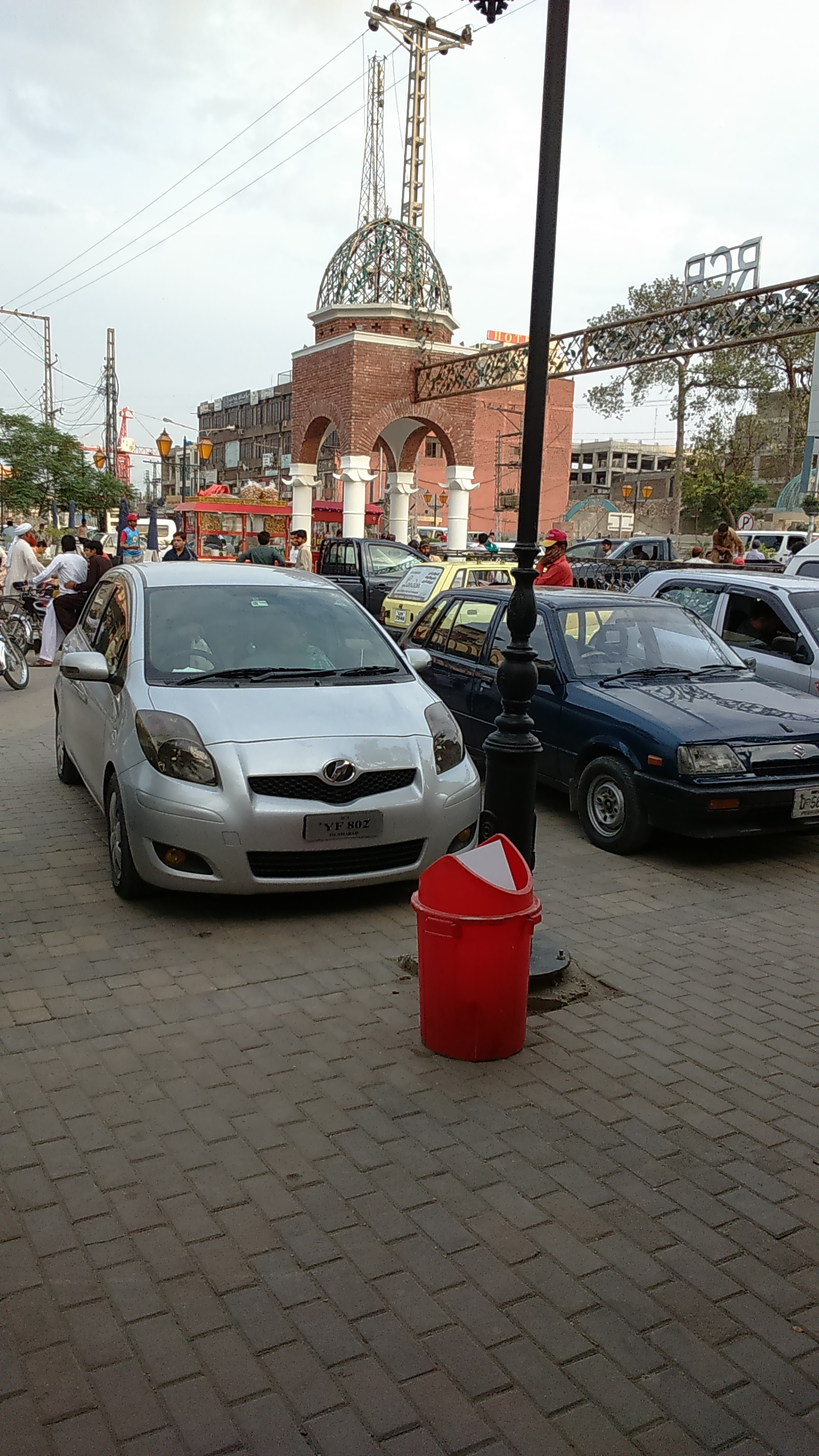
Rawalpindi food street, Saddar

- Rawalpindi Golf Course was completed in 1926 by Rawalpindi Golf Club, one of the oldest golf clubs of Pakistan. The facility was initially developed as a nine-hole course. After several phases of development, it is now a 27-hole course and the biggest in Pakistan. From the clubhouse, there is a panoramic view of Faisal Mosque, the twin cities of Islamabad and Rawalpindi. Major domestic golf tournaments are regularly held here.
- Playland is another public park parallel to Ayub Park
- In 2019, after the Army Heritage Foundation took over Ayub park from Chaklala Cantonment Board, a new amusement park called JoyLand was opened on the site of a previously failed project. This newly developed park has a number of rides and activities for visitors, from the relaxing Ferris wheel to the daring Discovery. All rides are imported and meet safety standards. JoyLand is the only amusement park in Pakistan that is ISO 9001:2008 certified.

== See also ==
- Central Jail Rawalpindi
- Christ Church, Rawalpindi
- List of educational institutions in Rawalpindi
- Dhamial
- Ghazi Barotha water supply project
- Military Hospital Rawalpindi
- Pakistan Army Museum
- Murree Road
- Treaty of Rawalpindi
- HMS Rawalpindi
- Rawalpindi Gazetteer
- Shoaib Akhtar

== Bibliography ==
- M.M. Ahmed (1985), Teenager, Volume 16, The University of Virginia, p. 11
