= Babu Passenger =

Pakistani train

Overview
- Service type: Inter-city rail
- First service: 1983
- Current operator: Pakistan Railways

Route
- Termini: Lahore Junction; Lala MusaJunction
- Distance travelled: 145 kilometres (90 mi)
- Average journey time: 2 hours, 5 minutes
- Service frequency: Daily
- Train numbers: 205UP (Lahore→Wazirabad); 206DN (Wazirabad→Lahore)

On-board services
- Class: Economy
- Sleeping arrangements: Not Available
- Catering facilities: Not Available

Technical
- Track gauge: 1,676 mm (5 ft 6 in)
- Track owner: Pakistan Railways

The Babu Passenger (Urdu: بابو مسافر) is a daily passenger train operated by Pakistan Railways between Lahore and Lala Musa. The journey takes approximately 2 hours and 5 minutes to cover a distance of 133 kilometres (83 mi), traveling along a stretch of the Karachi–Peshawar Railway Line. The train was suspended in 2020 due to covid 19. After a long break it was finally restored on 20 August 2026 with extension of route to Lala Musa. Previously it ran between Lahore and Wazirabad

== Route ==
- Lahore Junction to Wazirabad Junction via the Karachi–Peshawar Railway Line

== List of stations ==
- Lahore Junction
- Badami Bagh
- Shahdara Bagh Junction
- Kala Shah Kaku
- Muridke
- Sadhoke
- Kamoke
- Eminabad
- Gujranwala
- Gujranwala Cantonment
- Ghakkhar Mandi
- Dhaunkal
- Wazirabad Junction
- Deona Juliani
- Lala Musa Junction

== Onboard Facilities ==
The Babu Passenger offers economy class seating with berth facilities.
