= Subak Raftar =

Pakistani passenger train

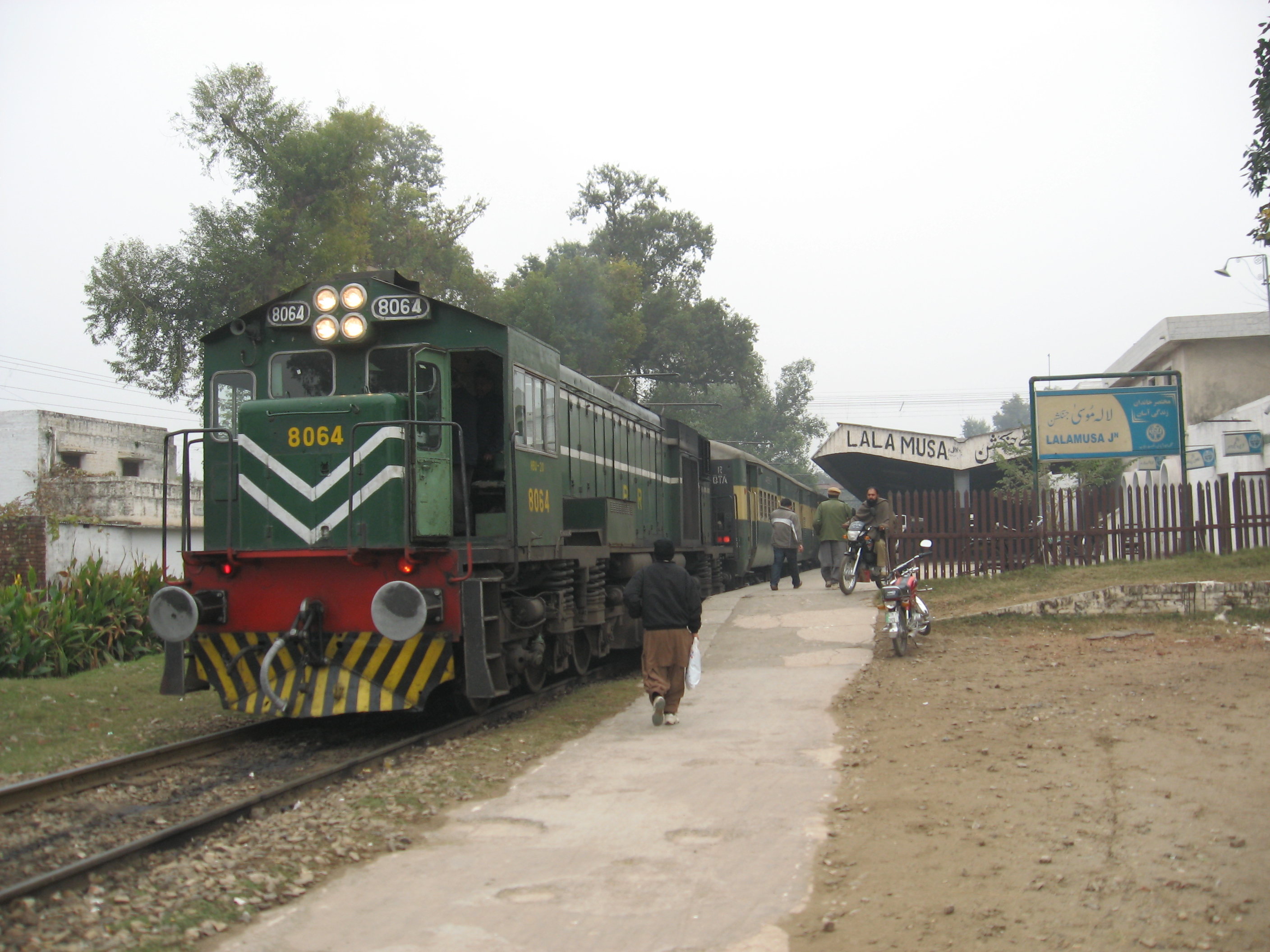
- Subak Raftar at Lalamusa Junction

Overview
- Service type: Railcar
- Status: Operating
- Current operator: Pakistan Railways
- Website: www.pakrail.gov.pk

Route
- Termini: Lahore Junction; Rawalpindi
- Stops: 6
- Distance travelled: 290 km (180 mi)
- Average journey time: 5 hours
- Service frequency: Daily
- Train numbers: 101 UP (Lahore→Rawalpindi), 102 DN (Rawalpindi→Lahore)

On-board services
- Classes: Economy Class; AC Standard; AC Business; Parlour Car
- Seating arrangements: Available
- Sleeping arrangements: Available
- Catering facilities: Available
- Baggage facilities: Available

Technical
- Track gauge: Broad Gauge

Subak Raftar (Urdu: سبک رفتار) is a daily passenger train service between Lahore and Rawalpindi in Punjab, Pakistan.

== History ==
Subak Raftar means fast and speedy runner. The train has economy, AC lower, AC parlor and business class accommodation. It covers a distance of about 290 kilometres (180 mi) in 4 hours 35 minutes.

In 2012, it was reported that the train has lost its popularity after the launch of Margalla Express.

== Subak Raftar ==
The Pakistan Railway has designated the Subak Raftar with the UP designation of 101, running from Lahore Junction to Margala Rawalpindi, and DN designation of 102, traveling from Rawalpindi to Lahore. The train commences in Lahore and makes stops at various stations including Gujranwala, Wazirabad, Gujrat, Lalamusa Junction, Jhelum, Gujar Khan and Chaklala, before reaching its final destination in Rawalpindi.

== Stations ==
It has following train stops:

- Lahore Junction
- Gujranwala
- Wazirabad Junction
- Gujrat
- Lalamusa Junction
- Jhelum
- Chaklala
- Rawalpindi
