= NQU =

NQU may refer to:

- National Quemoy University, a national university in Jinning Township, Kinmen, Taiwan
- North Queensferry railway station, Fife, Scotland, National Rail station code
- Nur Junction railway station, Pakistan, station code
