= Margalla Express =

Pakistani passenger train

Overview
- Service type: Inter-city rail
- First service: 2014
- Current operator: Pakistan Railways

Route
- Termini: Lahore Junction; Rawalpindi
- Stops: 4
- Distance travelled: 284 kilometres (176 mi)
- Average journey time: 4 hours, 50 minutes
- Service frequency: Daily
- Train numbers: 109UP (Lahore→Rawalpindi); 110DN (Rawalpindi→Lahore)

On-board services
- Classes: AC Parlor; AC Business; AC Standard; Economy
- Sleeping arrangements: Not available
- Catering facilities: Available

Technical
- Track gauge: 1,676 mm (5 ft 6 in)
- Track owner: Pakistan Railways

Margalla Express (Urdu: مارگلہ ایکسپریس) is a passenger train operated daily by Pakistan Railways between Lahore and Rawalpindi. The trip takes approximately 4 hours, 50 minutes to cover a published distance of 298 kilometres (185 mi), traveling along a stretch of the Karachi–Peshawar Railway Line. The train named after the Margalla Hills in Islamabad

== Route ==
- Lahore Junction–Rawalpindi via Karachi–Peshawar Railway Line

== Station stops ==
- Lahore Junction
- Gujranwala
- Wazirabad Junction
- Gujrat
- Chaklala
- Rawalpindi

== Equipment ==
The train offers AC Parlor, AC Business, AC Standard and Economy class.
