= CKL (disambiguation) =

CKL may refer to:

- Chkalovsky Air Base, the IATA code CKL
- ckl, the ISO 639-3 code for Cibak language
- Central Kansas League, a Class D level baseball league established in 1908
- Corkickle railway station, the station code CKL
- Chaklala railway station, the station code CKL
