= Rawalpindi railway station =

Railway station in Rawalpindi, Pakistan

Rawalpindi Railway Station راولپنڈی ریلوے اسٹیشن
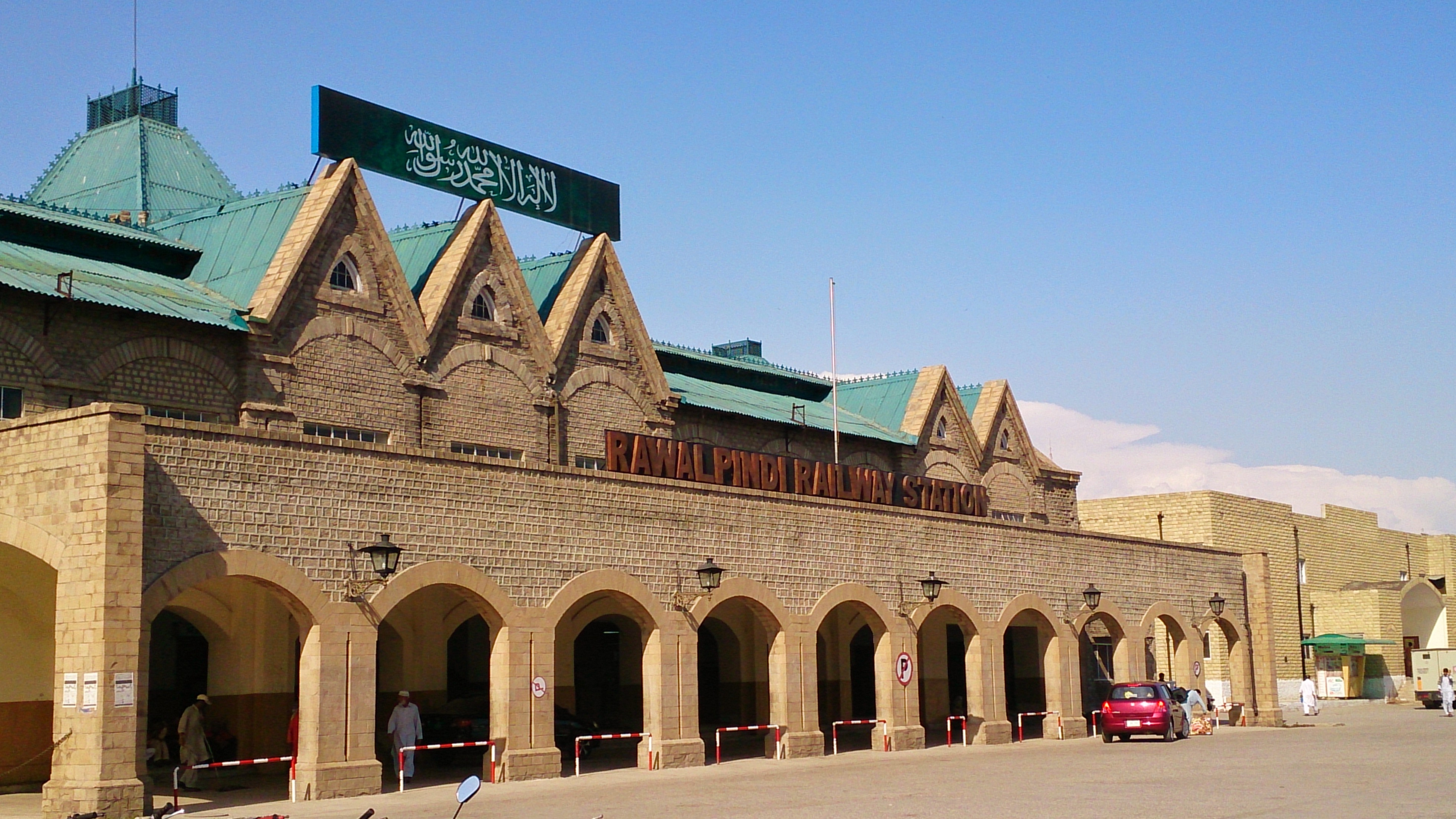
- Rawalpindi railway station - main entrance

General information
- Location: Station Road, Rawalpindi, Punjab 46000; Pakistan
- Coordinates: 33.6036°N 73.0483°E
- Elevation: 502 metres (1,647 ft)
- Owner: Ministry of Railways; Pakistan Railways
- Lines: Karachi–Peshawar Railway Line; Islamabad–Muzaffarabad Branch Line
- Platforms: 5: 1,800 feet long; 150 fee wide
- Tracks: 11: 5 passenger; 6 commercial
- Connections: Metrobus; Bus stand; Taxicab stand, Autorickshaw

Construction
- Structure type: Standard (On Ground Station)
- Platform levels: 2
- Parking: Available
- Cycle facilities: Available
- Accessible: Available

Other information
- Status: Functional
- Station code: RWP
- Fare zone: Pakistan Railways Rawalpindi Zone
- Website: https://www.pakrail.gov.pk/

History
- Opened: 1881; 145 years ago
- Rebuilt: 2019
- Former names: North Western State Railway

Services
| Preceding station | Pakistan Railways | Following station |
|---|---|---|
| Chaklala towards Kiamari | Karachi–Peshawar Line | Nur (Rawalpindi) towards Peshawar Cantonment |
- Computerized Ticketing Counters Luggage Checking System Parking Disabled Access Food Plaza Kiosks WC Taxi Stand Public Transportation Metro interchange Mosque
Location

Rawalpindi Railway Station (Urdu and Punjabi: راولپنڈی ریلوے اسٹیشن) is located in Saddar area of Rawalpindi, Punjab, Pakistan. It is one of several major stops on the Karachi–Peshawar Railway Line. The nearest Saddar Metrobus Station, part of the Rawalpindi-Islamabad Metrobus is 1.5 km, or a 20-minute walk, away.

From Rawalpindi Railway Station trains go to various cities of Pakistan including Karachi, Lahore, Quetta, Peshawar, Gujranwala, Sargodha, Gujarat, Multan, Faisalabad, Bahawalpur, Rahimyar Khan, Jhang, Hyderabad, Nawabshah, Sukkar, Jhelum, Haripur, Nowshera, Sibi, Attock, Larkana, Kohat, Khanewal, Mianwali, Dera Ghazi Khan, Bhakkar, Gujar Khan, Sialkot, Narowal, Sahiwal, Okara, Mandi Bahauddin and Jacobabad included. Every train stops at Rawalpindi railway station for half an hour.

== History ==
Rawalpindi station was opened in 1881, during construction of the Punjab Northern State Railway which began in 1870. The route was first surveyed in 1857, and aimed to connect Lahore with Peshawar via Rawalpindi. Years of political and military debate followed as described under the "Lahore & Peshawar Railway". Along with several other railways, the Punjab Northern State Railway was merged with the Scinde, Punjab & Delhi Railway in 1886 to form the North Western State Railway.

== Station Building ==
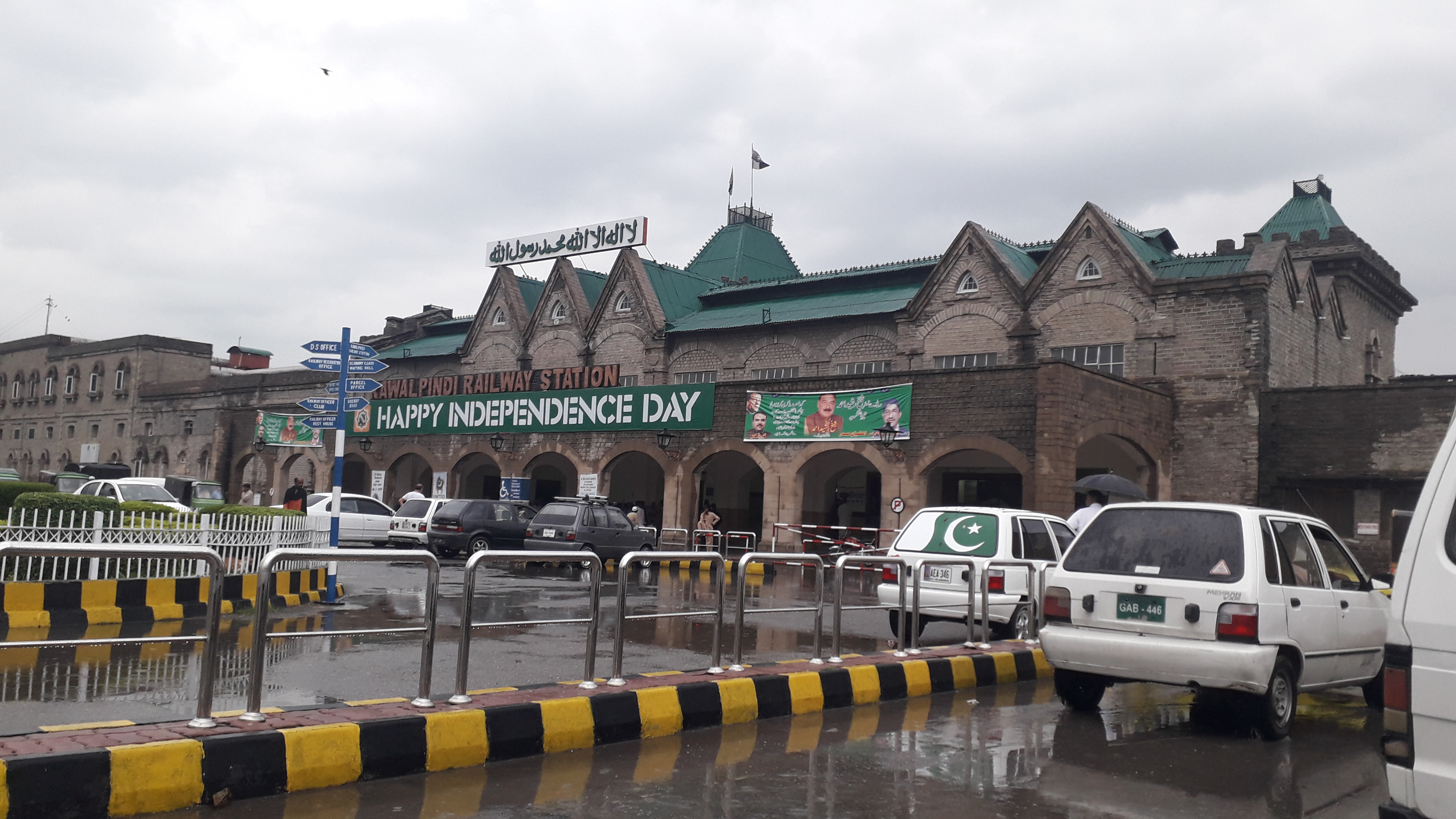
Rawalpindi Railway Station on a rainy day

The Victorian-era Rawalpindi Railway Station is a notable example of Indo-Saracenic architecture in the region. It was built a century ago in the British style, with yellow sandstone walls and arched entrances. Kerosene lamps adorn the walls, and there is an old grand clock near the platform and a bell that signals the arrival of a train. The main building of Rawalpindi Railway Station consists of three sections: the freight section, the passenger section and the main offices. The Railway Club building and Police Station are adjacent to the main building. The building has three separate entrances for regular passengers and baggage passengers. The grand clock and steam engine installed in front of the main building are among the prominent features of the station.

== Facilities ==
Facilities include railway reservations and information office, cargo pick and drop, toilets, tuck shops, book stalls, praying halls and rest areas.

== Services ==
Trains that stop at Rawalpindi Station are as follows:

| Preceding station | Pakistan Railways | Following station |
|---|---|---|
| Chaklala towards Karachi Cantonment | Awam Express | Taxila Cantonment Junction towards Peshawar Cantonment |
| Gujar Khan towards Karachi City | Hazara Express | Taxila Cantonment Junction towards Havelian |
| Chaklala towards Lahore Junction | Islamabad Express | Islamabad Terminus |
| Jhelum towards Quetta | Jaffar Express | Attock City Junction towards Peshawar Cantonment |
| Jhelum towards Karachi Cantonment | Khyber Mail | Attock City Junction towards Peshawar Cantonment |
| Chaklala towards Lahore Junction | Margalla Express | Terminus |
| Nur (Rawalpindi) towards Multan Cantonment | Mehr Express | Terminus |
| Lahore Junction Terminus | Rawal Express | Terminus |
| Jhelum towards Karachi Cantonment | Pakistan Express | Terminus |
| Chaklala towards Lahore Junction | Subak Raftar Express | Terminus |
| Chaklala towards Lahore Junction | Subak Kharam Express | Terminus |
| Jhelum towards Karachi Cantonment | Tezgam | Terminus |

== Location ==
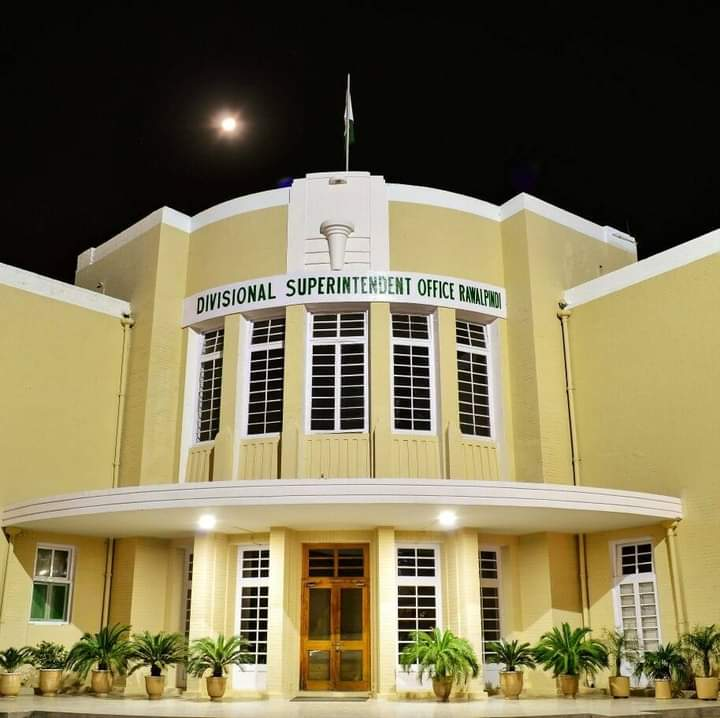

Rawalpindi Railway Station is located in Rawalpindi. The historic railway station is located in the centre of the city on Station Road in the Saddar area and close to the historic Raja Bazaar. Along with Rawalpindi railway station there is Islamabad Railway Station of the capital of Pakistan. And Golra Sharif Railway Museum is also near the station.

== See also ==
- Pakistan Railways
- List of railway stations in Pakistan
