= GKR =

GKR may refer to:

- GKR, an artist contracted with Mad Decent
- Project G.e.e.K.e.R., an animated television series
- Honor to serve Riga (Latvian: Gods kalpot Rīgai!), a municipal political party located in Riga, Latvia
- Ghakkhar Mandi railway station, the station code GKR
