= Raja, Gujranwala =

Raja راجہ
- Village
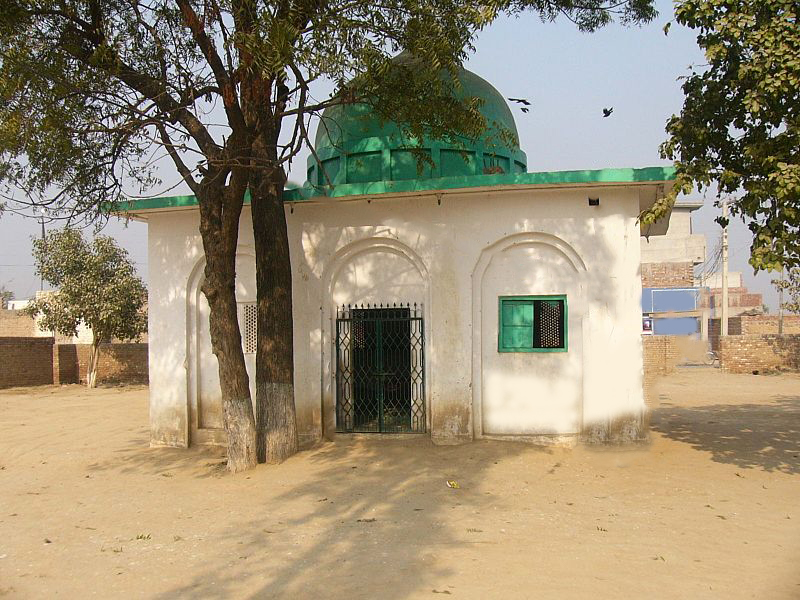
- Darbar Baba Wali Shah Dola Raja

- Location in Pakistan Raja راجہ (Pakistan)
- Coordinates: 31°54′3″N 74°13′29″E
- Country: Pakistan
- Region: Punjab
- District: Gujranwala District
- Tehsil: Kamoke Tehsil
- Union Council: Sadhoke
- Elevation: 218 m (715 ft)

Population (2010)
  - Total: 4,200
- Time zone: UTC+5 (PST)
  - Summer (DST): UTCNA (PDT)
- Postal code: 52368
- Dialling code: 055
- Raja is a small Village near Sadhoke

Raja Rājāh (Urdu, Punjabi: راجہ) is a village of Gujranwala District located in Punjab, Pakistan

== Mosques ==
Jamia Masjid Sadiqia Rizvia (Hanafi Bareelvi Bary Manaar Wali)
Jamia Masjid Rabbani (Ahl-e-Hadees)
Jamia Masjid Madni (Hanafi Deobandi)
Masjid Alhayat (Hanafi Deobandi)
Jamia Masjid Mukarram Ahlehadees (Toheedi Sect)
Imambargah Hussania Masjid (Fikkah Jafria)

== Schools and education ==
SP High School
Govt. Primary School for Girls
Govt. High School for Boys
Govt. Primary School for Boys
Sir Sayed Model School

== Banks ==
MCB Bank Limited (Raja Sadhoke Branch)

== Agriculture ==
Rice and wheat are the basic crops cultivated in the area.

== Hospitals ==
Basic Health Unit Raja.

== Transportation ==
The main nearby highway is the N-5 Grand Trunk Road, passing through Sadhoke which is connected to the village by Baig Pur Road and Canal Road. Baig Pur Road, passing through many small villages, ends at Baig Pur village situated on Gujranwala-Sheikhupura Road.
No train station in located in Raja. The nearest train station is Sadhoke railway station, where a few local trains briefly stop.

== Telecommunications ==
PTCL = PSTN and DSL
JAZZ = Cellular with 4G LTE indoor Services
Ufone = Cellular with 4G Services
Zong = Cellular with 4G Services
National Broadband Optic Fiber to Home

== Climate ==
Weather conditions for Raja village are dominated by its geographical location. The summer season is long and hot, with the temperature highs reaching up to 46 °C (115 °F).

Climate data for Raja
Month	Jan	Feb	Mar	Apr	May	Jun	Jul	Aug	Sep	Oct	Nov	Dec	Year
Mean daily maximum °C (°F)	18 (64)	21 (69)	26 (78)	33 (91)	39 (102)	40 (104)	35 (95)	33 (91)	34 (93)	32 (89)	26 (78)	20 (68)	29 (84)
Mean daily minimum °C (°F)	5 (41)	8 (46)	12 (53)	18 (64)	23 (73)	26 (78)	26 (78)	25 (77)	23 (73)	17 (62)	10 (50)	5 (41)	16 (60)
Average rainfall cm (inches)	4.1 (1.6)	4 (1.6)	4.4 (1.7)	2.1 (0.8)	1.7 (0.7)	6.8 (2.7)	27.1 (10.7)	25.6 (10.1)	13.2 (5.2)	1.4 (0.6)	1.1 (0.4)	2.1 (0.8)	93.6 (36.8)
Source: Climate-Data.org

== Nearby locations ==
Sadhoke 1 km east side
Muridke 13 km South via Sadhoke
kamoke 10 km North via Sadhoke
Sheikhupura 30 km West via Baig pur road
Gujranwala 30 km North via sadhoke
Lahore 35 km South via Sadhoke

== Major tribes ==
Malik, Syed, Rajputs and Jats are major tribe. The principal clans are Virk Gill Rajput Mughal Khokhar Ansari Kumar Arain Mochi Minhas Bhatti Qureshi Julah Chowkidar Bajwa and a small Christian community also residing here.
