= KAX =

KAX may refer to:

- Kala Gujran railway station (Station code: KAX), a railway station in Kala Gujran village, Jhelum district, Pakistan
- Kalbarri Airport (IATA: KAX), a public use airport in Kalbarri, Western Australia
