= Green Line (Pakistan Railways) =

Pakistani passenger train

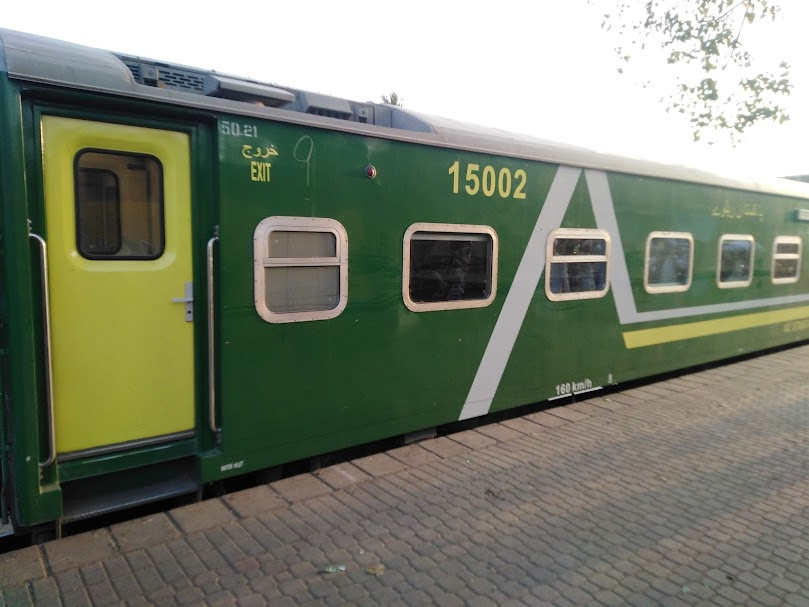

Overview
- Service type: Express
- First service: 2015
- Current operator: Pakistan Railways

Route
- Termini: Karachi Cantonment; Islamabad
- Stops: 8
- Distance travelled: 1,518 kilometres (943 mi)
- Average journey time: 23 hours and 45 minutes
- Service frequency: Daily
- Train numbers: 5UP (Karachi→Margalla); 6DN (Margalla→Karachi)

On-board services
- Classes: Economy Class; AC Standard; AC Business; Parlour Car
- Seating arrangements: Yes
- Sleeping arrangements: Yes
- Catering facilities: Yes
- Entertainment facilities: Yes
- Baggage facilities: Yes

Technical
- Track gauge: 1,676 mm (5 ft 6 in)
- Electrification: No
- Operating speed: Max: 105 km/h (65 mph); Avg: 72 km/h (45 mph)
- Track owner: Pakistan Railways

The Green Line (Urdu: سبز ایکسپریس) is an express train operated daily by Pakistan Railways between Karachi and Islamabad (Margalla railway station). It is the flagship rail of the organization and has the highest passage priority. The train takes approximately 21 hours to cover a published distance of 1,521 kilometres (945 mi), traveling along a stretch of the Karachi–Peshawar Railway Line. It was inaugurated by Mian Muhammad Nawaz Sharif on 15 May 2015 at Islamabad railway station.

== Route ==
- Karachi Cantonment–Islamabad via Karachi–Peshawar Railway Line

== Station stops ==
- Karachi Cantonment
- Drigh Road
- Hyderabad Junction
- Rohri Junction
- Bahawalpur
- Khanewal Junction
- Lahore Kot Lakhpat Junction
- Chaklala
- Rawalpindi
- Islamabad

== Equipment ==
The train has Economy Class, AC Standard, AC Business and Parlour Car accommodations.

== Suspension ==
In the wake of the 2022 Pakistan Floods, the train's operations were suspended from 27 August 2022. With floodwater receding and rehabilitation of effected train tracks completing, Pakistan Railway announced they would resume the Green Line's operations in December 2022.

== 2022 Upgrades ==
On 28 November 2022, 46 high-speed coaches were delivered to Pakistan Railways by the China Railway Construction Corporation as per an agreement signed in 2021. These more modern coaches were first employed in the Green Line.

== Reinauguration ==
Green Line Express was re-inaugurated by Prime Minister of Pakistan Shehbaz Sharif on 27 January 2023.
