= Choa Kariala railway station =

Railway station in Punjab, Pakistan

Choa Kariala Railway Station چوآ کڑیالہ ریلوے اسٹیشن

General information
- Coordinates: 32.8796°N 73.7857°E
- Owner: Ministry of Railways
- Line: Karachi–Peshawar Railway Line

Other information
- Station code: CKRL

Services
| Preceding station | Pakistan Railways | Following station |
|---|---|---|
| Kharian towards Kiamari | Karachi–Peshawar Line | Sarai Alamgir towards Peshawar Cantonment |
Location

Choa Kariala Railway Station (Urdu and Punjabi: چوآکڑیالہ ریلوے اسٹیشن) is an abandoned railway station located in Choa Kariala village, Gujrat district of Punjab province, Pakistan.

== See also ==
- List of railway stations in Pakistan
- Pakistan Railways
