= Jhelum railway station =

Railway station in Pakistan

Jhelum Railway Station جہلم ریلوے اسٹیشن
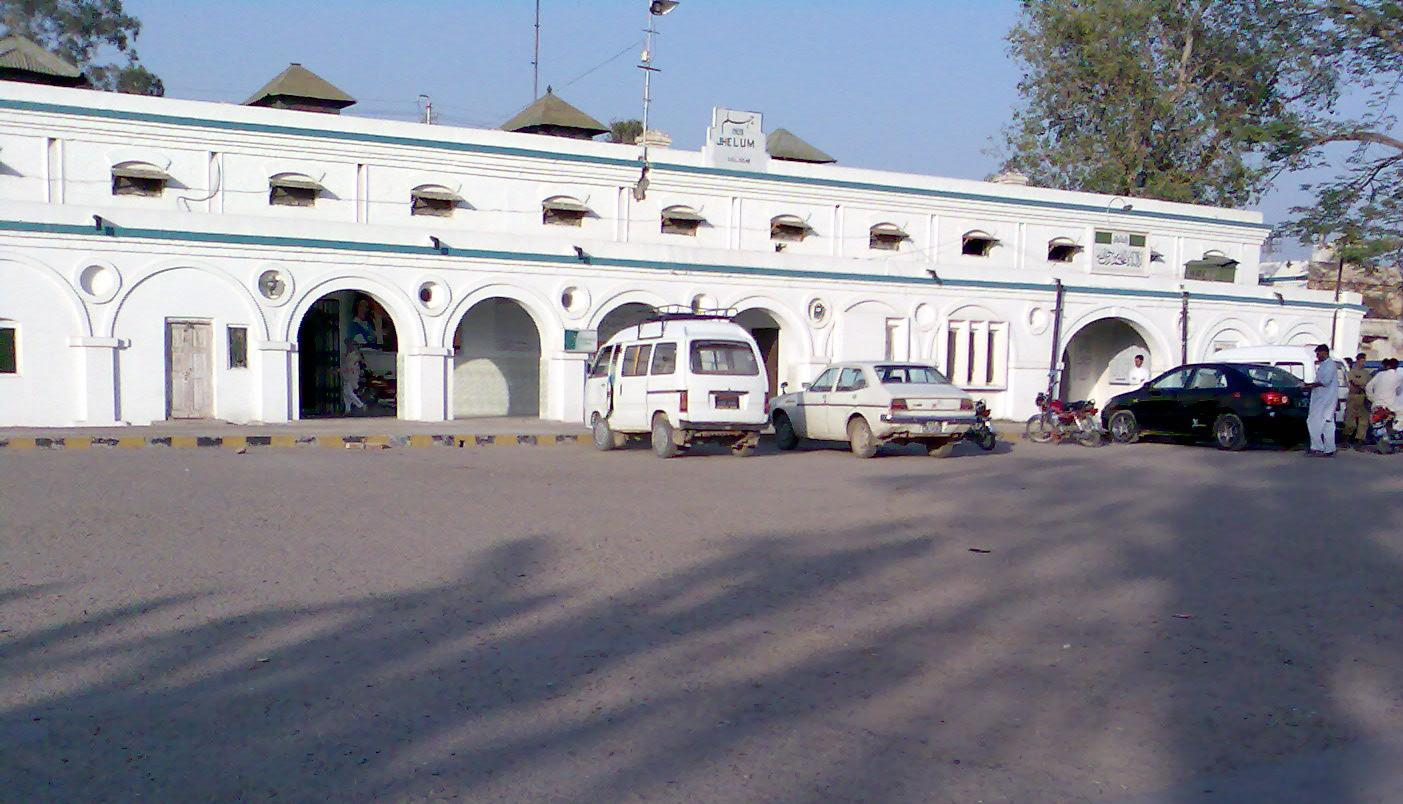

General information
- Coordinates: 32.9292°N 73.7259°E
- Owner: Ministry of Railways
- Line: Karachi–Peshawar Railway Line
- Platforms: 2
- Tracks: 3

Other information
- Station code: JMR

History
- Opened: 1928

Services
| Preceding station | Pakistan Railways | Following station |
|---|---|---|
| Sarai Alamgir towards Kiamari | Karachi–Peshawar Line | Kala Gujran towards Peshawar Cantonment |
Location

Jhelum Railway Station (Urdu and Punjabi: جہلم ریلوے اسٹیشن) is located in Jhelum city, Jhelum district of Punjab province, Pakistan. The station has stoppage of all trains except priority trains like Green Line Express, Rehman Baba Express and Islamabad Express.

The famous trains that start, end, or pass through Jhelum station include 1st Eidulfitr Special, 2nd Eid Special, 3rd Eid Special, 4th Eidulfitr Special, Awam Express, Hazara Express and Jaffar Express.

== See also ==
- List of railway stations in Pakistan
- Pakistan Railways

== Gallery ==
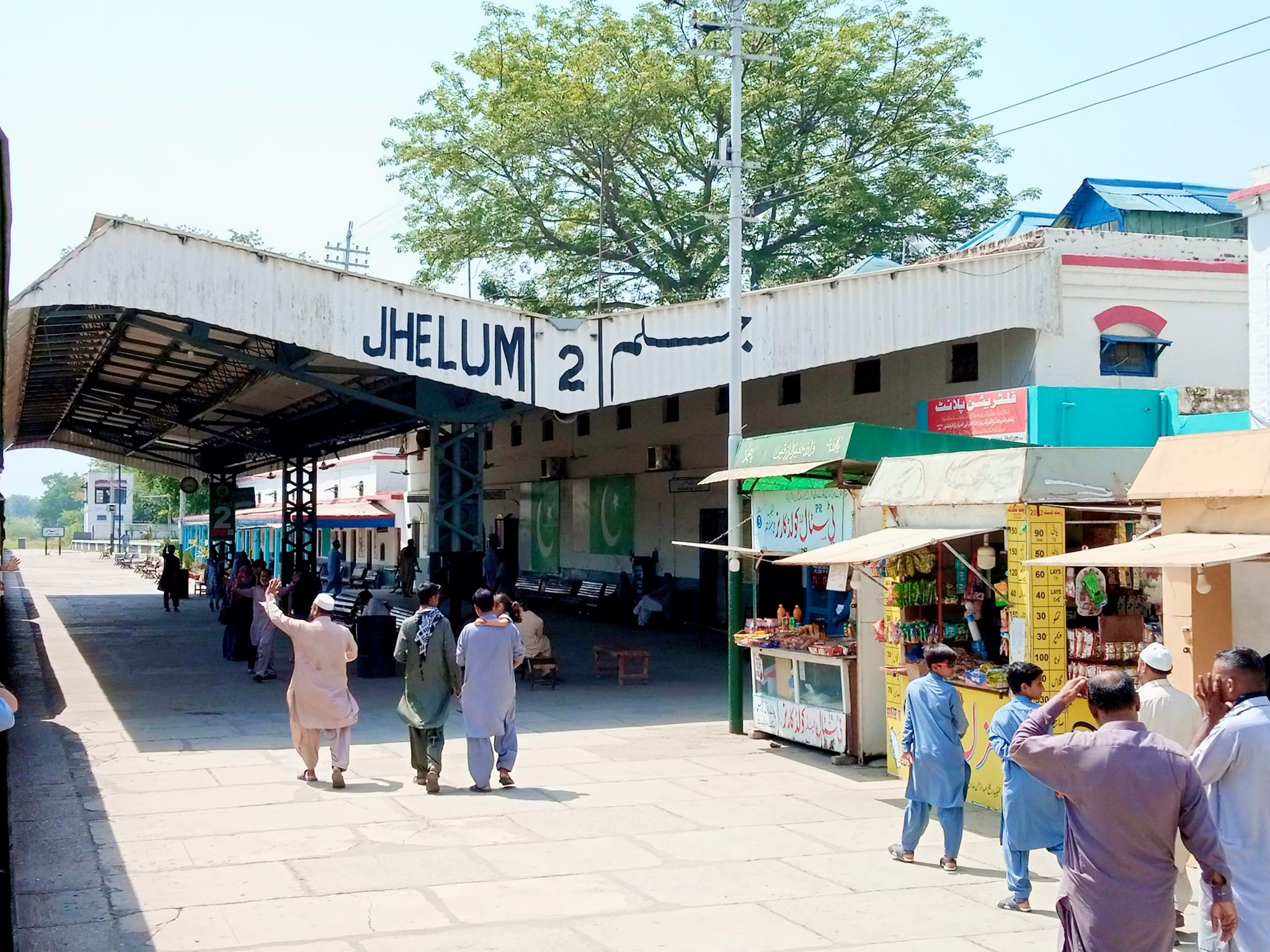

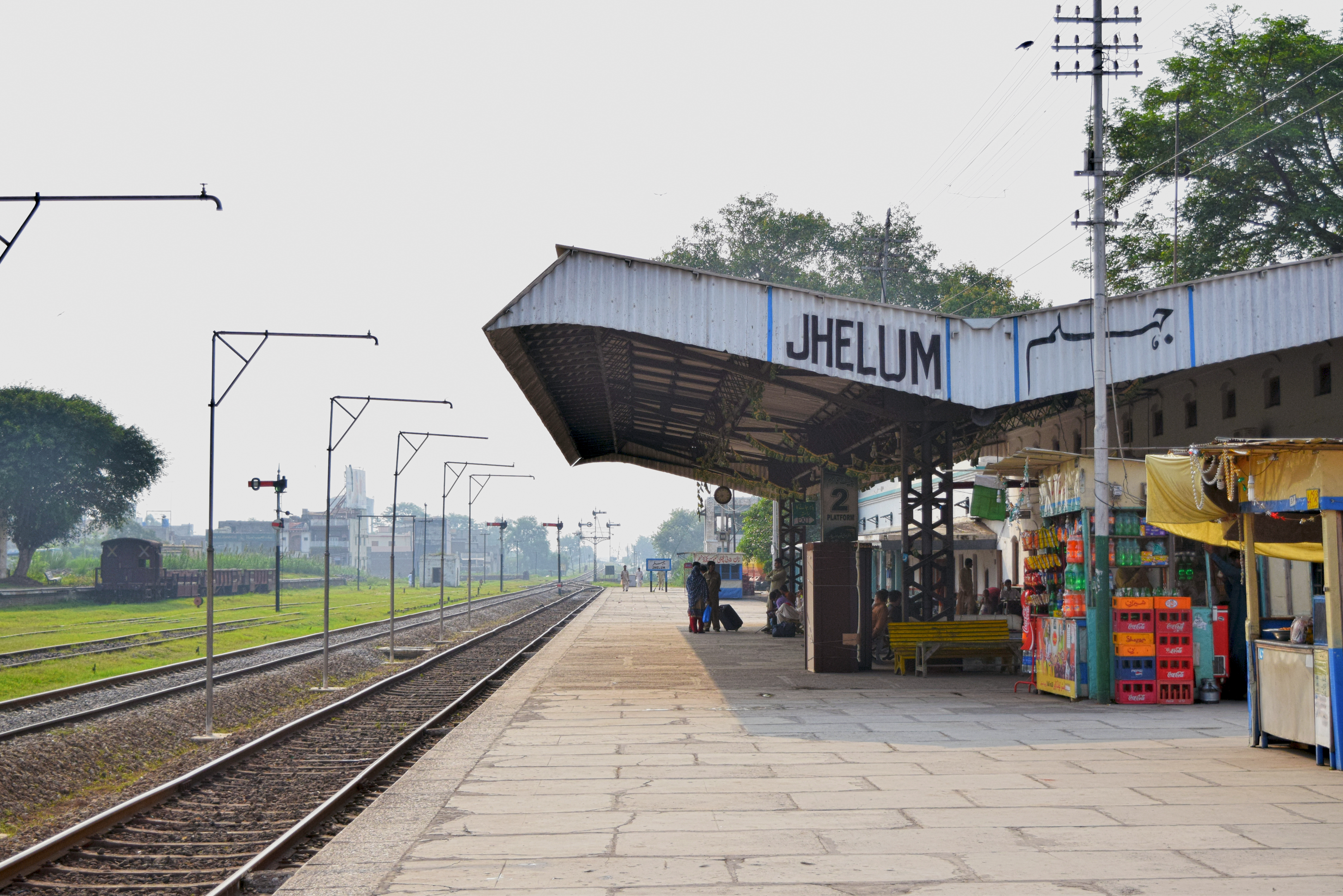
