= Madina-Tul-Hijjaj railway station =

Railway station in Islamabad, Pakistan

Madina-Tul-Hijjaj Station مدینۃ الحجاج ریلوے اسٹیشن
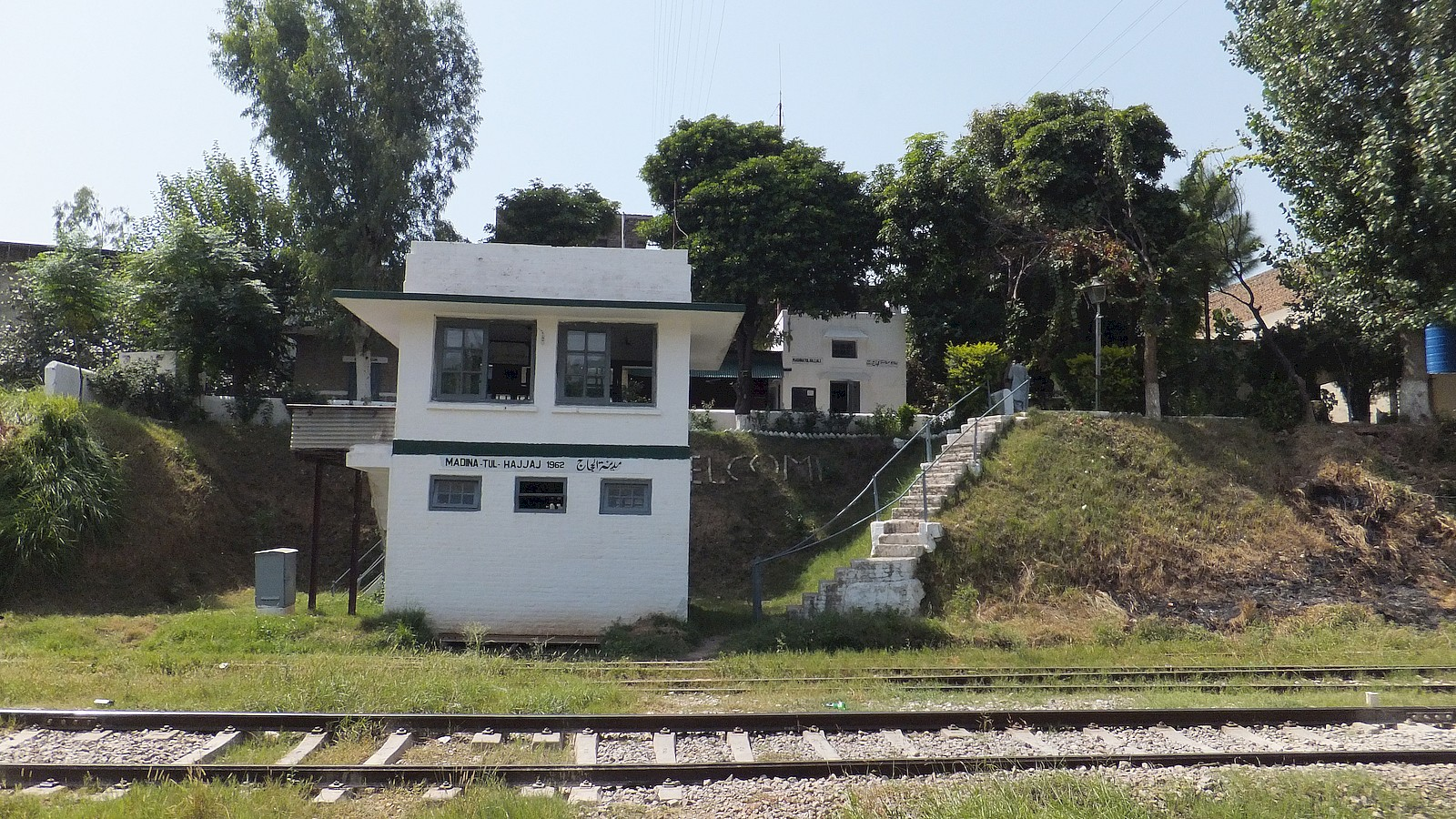
- View of the railway station from across the tracks

General information
- Coordinates: 33.632683°N 72.968528°E
- Owner: Ministry of Railways
- Line: Karachi–Peshawar Railway Line
- Platforms: 0
- Tracks: 3

Other information
- Station code: MTHJ

History
- Opened: 1962
- Former names: Surain railway station (SURN)

Services
Preceding station	Pakistan Railways	Following station
Nur Junction towards Kiamari	Karachi–Peshawar Line	Golra Sharif Junction towards Peshawar Cantonment
Location

Madina-Tul-Hijjaj Railway Station (Urdu and Punjabi: مدینۃ الحجاج ریلوے اسٹیشن) is located in Madina-Tul-Hijjaj, H-13 sector, Islamabad, Pakistan. The station was constructed in 1962.

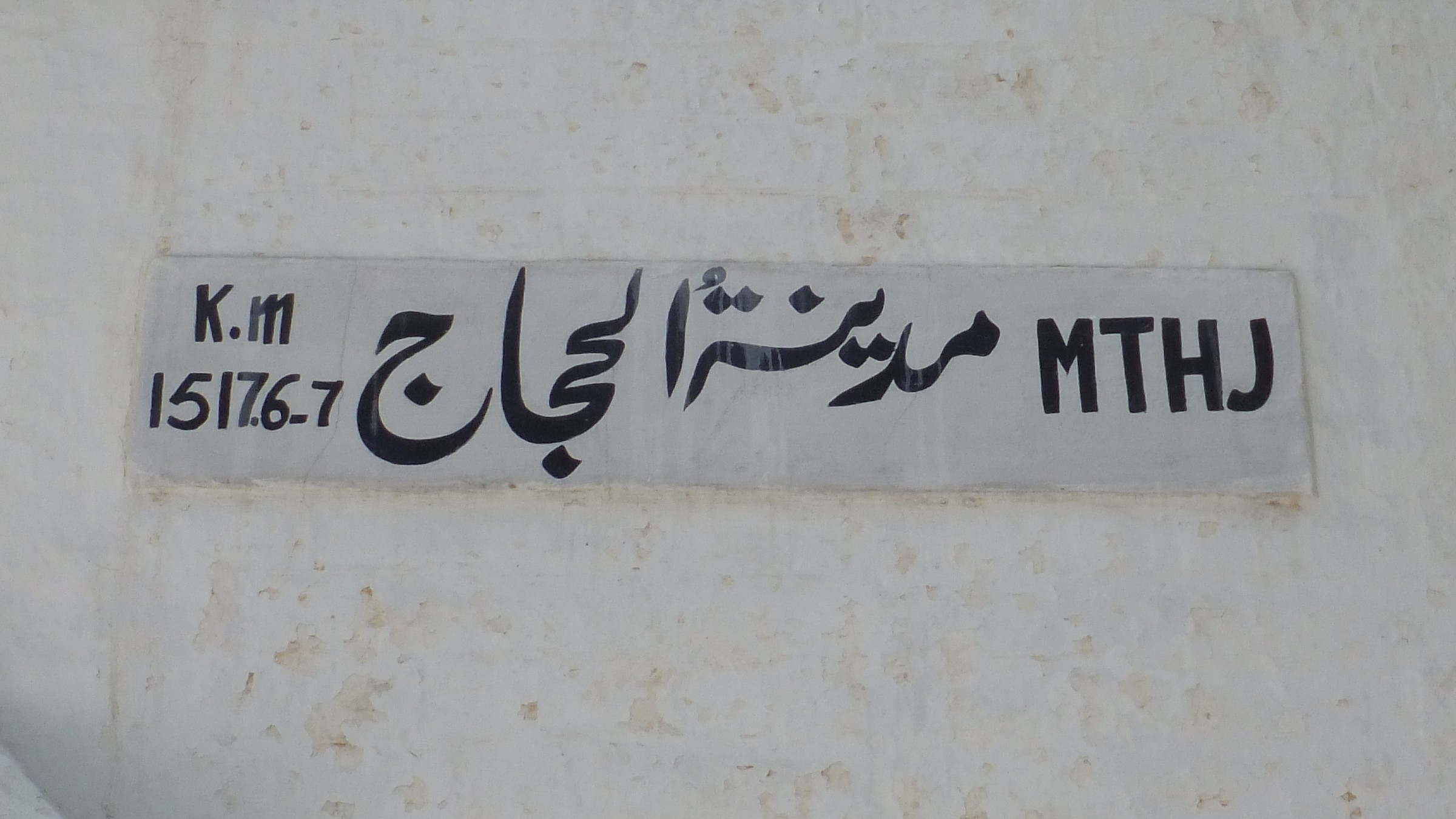
Madina tul Hajjaj station tag

== History ==
The station was constructed in 1962.

== Purpose ==
The station is used for crossing due to single line, no train stops at the railway station.

== See also ==
- List of railway stations in Pakistan
- Pakistan Railways
