= Kharian City railway station =

Railway station in Punjab, Pakistan

Kharian City Railway Station کھاریاں ریلوے اسٹیشن
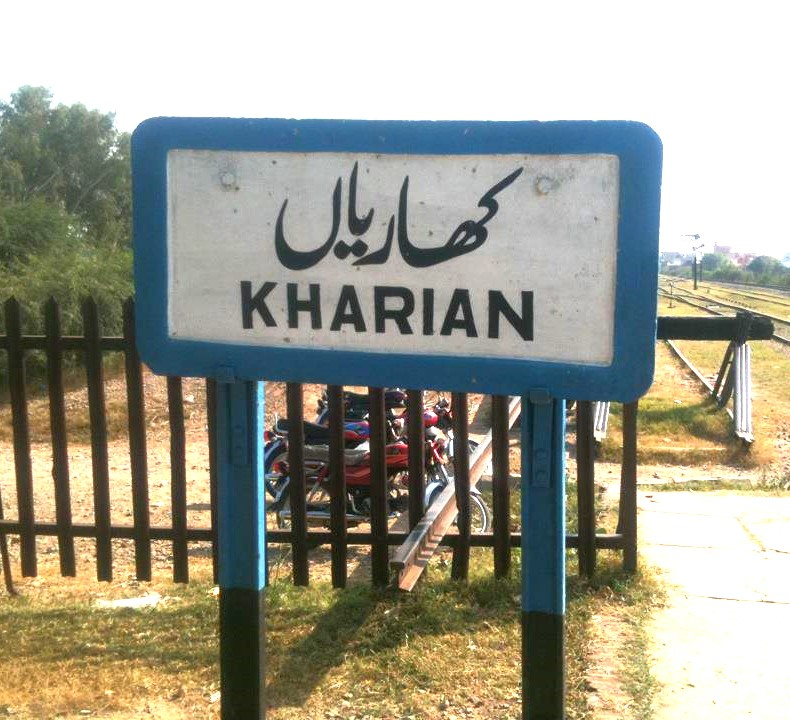

General information
- Coordinates: 32°48′56″N 73°51′22″E
- Owner: Ministry of Railways
- Line: Karachi–Peshawar Railway Line

Other information
- Station code: KRN

Services
Preceding station	Pakistan Railways	Following station
Kharian Cantonment towards Kiamari	Karachi–Peshawar Line	Choa Kariala towards Peshawar Cantonment
Location

Kharian City Railway Station (Urdu and Punjabi: کھاریاں ریلوے اسٹیشن) is located in Kharian in Kharian Tehsil of Gujrat District, Punjab province, Pakistan.

== See also ==
- List of railway stations in Pakistan
- Pakistan Railways
- Kharian
- Kharian Tehsil
- Gujrat District
