= Rawal Express =

Pakistani passenger train

Overview
- Service type: Express train

Route
- Termini: Lahore Junction; Rawalpindi
- Distance travelled: 290 kilometres (180 mi)
- Average journey time: 4 hours, 15 minutes
- Service frequency: Daily
- Train numbers: 105UP (Lahore→Rawalpindi); 106DN (Rawalpindi→Lahore)

On-board services
- Classes: AC Parlour; AC Business; AC Standard; Economy Class
- Catering facilities: Available

Technical
- Track gauge: 1,676 mm (5 ft 6 in)
- Track owner: Pakistan Railways

Rawal Express (Urdu: راول ایکسپریس) is an express train operated daily by Pakistan Railways between Lahore and Rawalpindi. The trip takes approximately 4 hours and 15 minutes to cover a published distance of 290 kilometres (180 mi), traveling along a stretch of the Karachi–Peshawar Line.

== Route ==
- Lahore Junction to Rawalpindi via Karachi–Peshawar Line

== Equipment ==
The train offers Economy Class, AC Standard, AC Business and Parlour Car.

== Incidents ==
On 23 November 2016, the locomotive and two carriages of the Rawal Express derailed upon approaching Rawalpindi. No passengers were seriously hurt.
