= Islamabad Express =

Pakistani passenger train

Overview
- Service type: Inter-city rail
- First service: 2004
- Current operator: Pakistan Railways

Route
- Termini: Lahore Junction; Islamabad
- Stops: 2
- Distance travelled: 300 kilometres (190 mi)/290 kilometres (180 mi)
- Average journey time: 4 hours, 15 minutes
- Service frequency: Daily
- Train numbers: 107UP (Lahore→Rawalpindi); 108DN (Margalla→Lahore)

On-board services
- Classes: Economy Class; AC Standard; AC Business; Parlour Car
- Sleeping arrangements: Available
- Catering facilities: Available

Technical
- Track gauge: 1,676 mm (5 ft 6 in)
- Track owner: Pakistan Railways

Islamabad Express (Urdu: اسلام آباد ایکسپریس) is an express train operated daily by Pakistan Railways between Lahore and Rawalpindi/Margalla. The trip takes approximately 4 hours, 15 minutes to cover a published distance of 300 kilometres (190 mi)/290 kilometres (180 mi) , traveling along a stretch of the Karachi–Peshawar Railway Line. The train is named after the capital city of Pakistan, Islamabad.

== History ==
The train began service on 8 September 2004 with Chinese rakes.

== Route ==
- Lahore Junction–Golra Sharif Junction via Karachi–Peshawar Railway Line
- Golra Sharif Junction–Islamabad via Islamabad Rail Link

== Halts ==
- Lahore Junction
- Chaklala
- Rawalpindi
- Islamabad

== Equipment ==
The train has Economy Class, AC Standard, AC Business and Parlour Car accommodations.
