= Sadhoke =

Pakistani

Sadhoke سادھوکی Sadhoke
- City
- سادھوکے
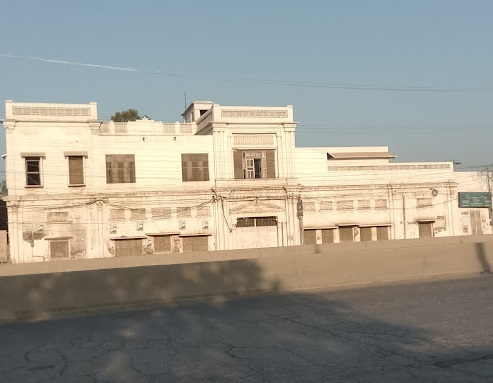
- Main G.T. Road Sadhoke
- Nickname: City of Ch Hakeem Noor Muhammad Sandhu
- Location in Pakistan Sadhoke (Pakistan)
- Coordinates: 31°54′23″N 74°14′06″E
- Country: Pakistan
- Region: Punjab
- District: Gujranwala District
- Tehsil: Kamoke Tehsil
- Union Council: Sadhoke
- Elevation: 218 m (715 ft)

Population
  - Total: 12,852
- Time zone: UTC+5 (PST)
  - Summer (DST): UTC+5 (PDT)
- Postal code: 52368
- Dialling code: 055
- Sadhoke is a small city situated on grand Trunk Road N5 between Lahore & Gujranwala.

Sadhoke (Punjabi: سادھوکی, Urdu: سادھوکے) is a town of Tehsil Kamoke in Gujranwala District in Punjab, Pakistan. It is located on Grand Trunk Road N-5.

== Agriculture ==
Rice, wheat and animal fodder are cultivated in the area. Vegetables like ladyfinger, pea, etc., are also grown.

== Transportation ==
=== Highways ===
Sadhoke is located on GT Road (N5) between Lahore and Gujranwala. Another highway connects Sadhoke with Mianwali Bangla, which is considered an important link between Lahore and Pasrur. This road also connects Kamoke with a number of nearby villages and towns like Wando, Kotli Nawab, Nagal Doona Singh, Narang and Pasrur. Two more roads connect Sadhoke to Gujranwala-Sheikhupura-Road at Baigpure and Majochak.

=== Rail ===
Sadhoke railway station, on the Karachi - Peshawer Railway Line, is located about 2.33 km from the main town.

=== Airport ===
The nearest airport, Allama Iqbal International Airport in Lahore, is about 55 km away and can be reached via N5 and M2. The second nearer airport is Sialkot International Airport which is located about 88 km away, can be reached via N5, Gujranwala Express Way, M11.

== Education ==
The Educators School
Allied School
Govt. Boys School
Govt. Girls School

== Climate ==
Sadhoke is in the northern hemisphere. Summer starts here in May and ends in September. There are the months of summer: May, June, July, August, September. The best time to visit are March, April, October. The month with the highest relative humidity is August (77.01 %). The month with the lowest relative humidity is May (29.36 %). The month with the highest number of rainy days is July (21.10 days). The month with the lowest number of rainy days is November (1.80 days). Sadhoke's climate is classified as warm and temperate. When compared with winter, the summers have much more rainfall. This location is classified as Cwa by Köppen and Geiger. The average annual temperature is 23.8 °C | 74.8 °F in Sadhoke. Precipitation here is about 877 mm | 34.5 inch per year.

Climate data for Sadhoke
Month	Jan	Feb	Mar	Apr	May	Jun	Jul	Aug	Sep	Oct	Nov	Dec	Year
Mean daily maximum °C (°F)	18 (64)	21 (69)	26 (78)	33 (91)	39 (102)	40 (104)	35 (95)	33 (91)	34 (93)	32 (89)	26 (78)	20 (68)	29 (84)
Mean daily minimum °C (°F)	5 (41)	8 (46)	12 (53)	18 (64)	23 (73)	26 (78)	26 (78)	25 (77)	23 (73)	17 (62)	10 (50)	5 (41)	16 (60)
Average rainfall cm (inches)	4.1 (1.6)	4 (1.6)	4.4 (1.7)	2.1 (0.8)	1.7 (0.7)	6.8 (2.7)	27.1 (10.7)	25.6 (10.1)	13.2 (5.2)	1.4 (0.6)	1.1 (0.4)	2.1 (0.8)	93.6 (36.8)
Source: Climate-Data.org

== Villages in Sadhoke Union Council ==
Sadhoke, Raja, Drajke, Manhais
