= Gujranwala City railway station =

Railway station in Gujranwala, Pakistan

Gujranwala City Station گوجرانوالہ شہر ریلوے اسٹیشن

General information
- Other names: Old Station, Gujranwala پرانا ریلوے اسٹیشن
- Coordinates: 32.1764°N 74.1871°E
- Owner: Ministry of Railways
- Line: Karachi–Peshawar Railway Line

Other information
- Status: Not operational
- Station code: GLCY

Services
Preceding station	Pakistan Railways	Following station
Eminabad towards Kiamari	Karachi–Peshawar Line	Gujranwala towards Peshawar Cantonment
Location

Gujranwala City Railway Station (Urdu: گوجرانوالہ شہر ریلوے اسٹیشن) was a railway station located at Grand Trunk Road, Gujranwala, Punjab. It is no more functional.

== Services ==
Trains that stay at Gujranwala City railway station
Train Number	Train Name	Origin	Destination	Arrival (Grw City)	Departure (Grw City)
No train stay here. Data synced through Official Website of Pakistan Railways on PST 12:33 AM June 19, 2022

== See also ==
- List of railway stations in Pakistan
- Pakistan Railways
