= Sarai Alamgir railway station =

Railway station in Punjab, Pakistan

Sarai Alamgir Railway Station سرائے عالمگیر ریلوے اسٹیشن
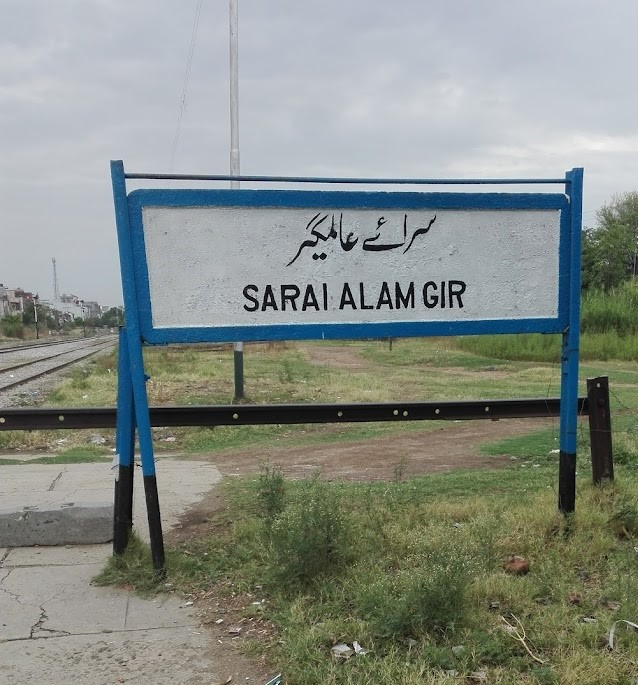

General information
- Coordinates: 32.9068°N 73.7494°E
- Owner: Ministry of Railways
- Line: Karachi–Peshawar Railway Line

Other information
- Station code: SXG

Services
Preceding station	Pakistan Railways	Following station
Choa Kariala towards Kiamari	Karachi–Peshawar Line	Jhelum towards Peshawar Cantonment
Location

Sarai Alamgir Railway Station (Urdu and Punjabi: سرائے عالمگیر ریلوے اسٹیشن) is located in Sarai Alamgir, Gujrat district of Punjab province, Pakistan.

== See also ==
- List of railway stations in Pakistan
- Pakistan Railways
