= Gujranwala railway station =

Railway station in Gujranwala, Pakistan

Gujranwala Railway Station گوجرانوالہ ریلوے اسٹیشن
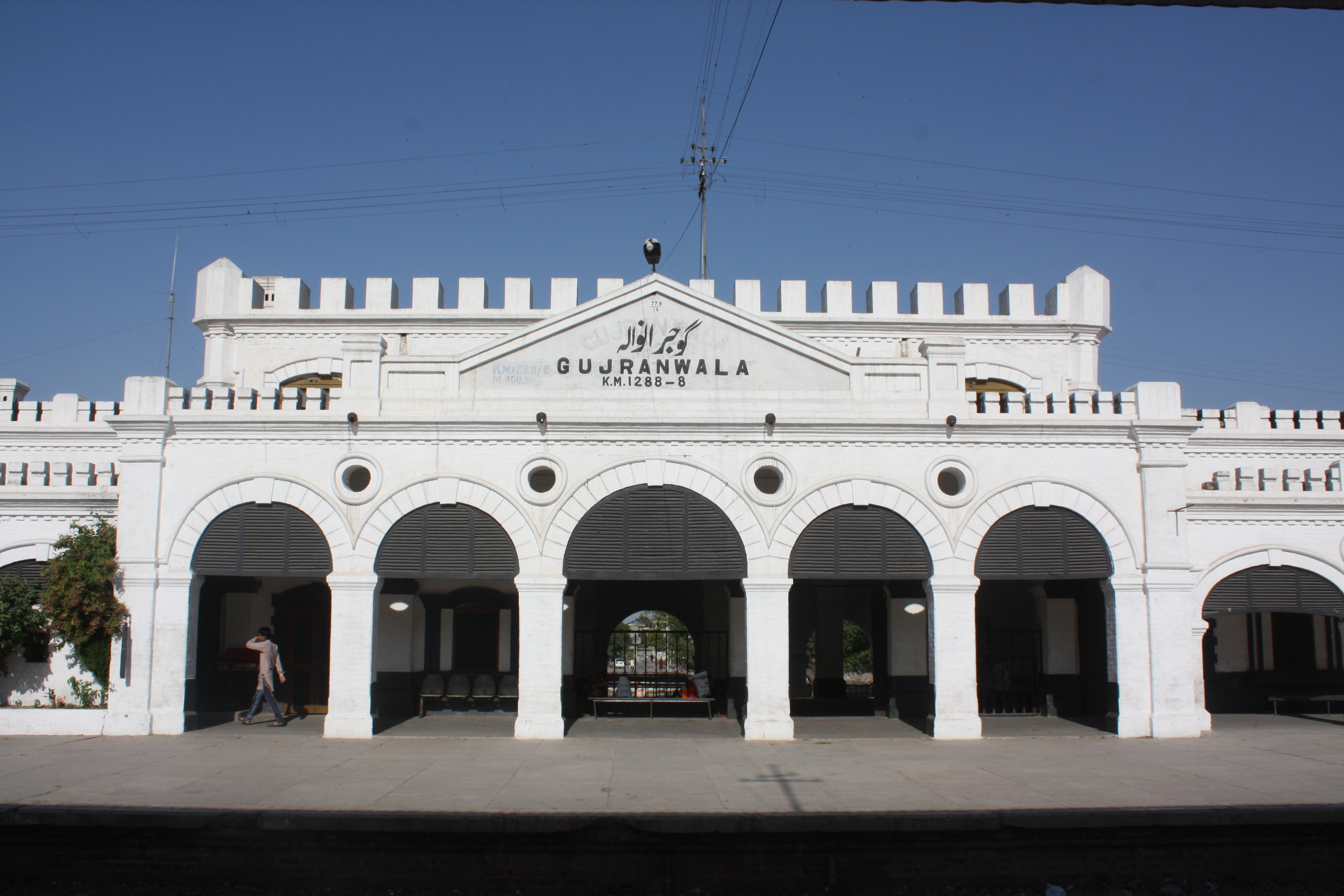

General information
- Coordinates: 32°10′36″N 74°11′15″E
- Owner: Ministry of Railways
- Line: Karachi–Peshawar Railway Line

Construction
- Parking: Available
- Accessible: Available

Other information
- Station code: GRW

History
- Opened: 1881

Services
Preceding station	Pakistan Railways	Following station
Gujranwala City towards Kiamari	Karachi–Peshawar Line	Gujranwala Cantonment towards Peshawar Cantonment
Location

Gujranwala Railway Station (Urdu: گوجرانوالہ ریلوے اسٹیشن) is located in Gujranwala city, Gujranwala district of Punjab province of Pakistan. Gujranwala is the 5th largest city of Pakistan. Gujranwala Railway Station consists of 4 platforms. The most important aspect of this station is that it is attached to the main railway line between Karachi and Peshawar. The Ministry of Railways is working to improve services at this station. Gujranwala consists of 3 railway stations: Gujranwala City, Gujranwala, and Gujranwala Cantt railway station.

== Services ==
The following trains stay at Gujranwala Railway Station. Timings were synced through the official website of Pakistan Railways on PST 11:50 PM June 18, 2022.

Awam Express ceased operation as reported by Station officials on March 20, 2023.

Trains which stay at Gujranwala Railway Station
Train Number	Train Name	Origin	Destination	Arrival (Gujranwala)	Departure (Gujranwala)
01 UP	KHYBER MAIL	KARACHI CANTT	PESHAWAR CANTT	21:15	21:20
02 DN	KHYBER MAIL	PESHAWAR CANTT	KARACHI CANTT	06:00	06:05
07 UP	TEZGAM	KARACHI CANTT	RAWALPINDI	14:12	14:17
08 DN	TEZGAM	RAWALPINDI	KARACHI CANTT	12:00	12:05
39 UP	JAFFER EXPRESS	QUETTA	PESHAWAR CANTT	09:54	09:56
40 DN	JAFFER EXPRESS	PESHAWAR CANTT	QUETTA	14:14	14:16
101 UP	SUBAK RAFTAR EXPRESS	LAHORE	RAWALPINDI	08:00	08:02
102 DN	SUBAK RAFTAR EXPRESS	RAWALPINDI	LAHORE	10:48	10:50
103 UP	SUBAK KHARAM EXPRESS	LAHORE	RAWALPINDI	17:25	17:27
104 DN	SUBAK KHARAM EXPRESS	RAWALPINDI	LAHORE	20:41	20:43

== See also ==
- List of railway stations in Pakistan
- Pakistan Railways
