= Muridke railway station =

Railway station in Punjab, Pakistan

Muridke Railway Station مریدکے ریلوے اسٹیشن
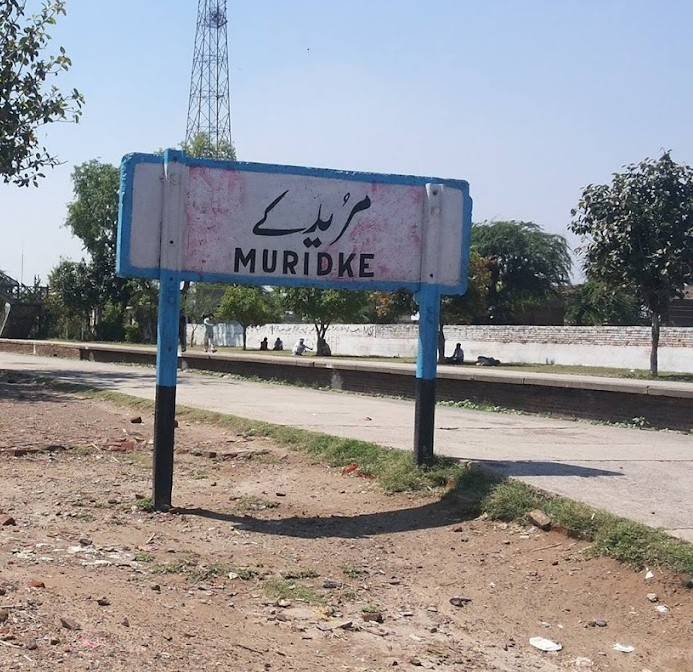

General information
- Coordinates: 31.8008°N 74.2591°E
- Owner: Ministry of Railways
- Line: Karachi–Peshawar Railway Line

Other information
- Station code: MDK

Services
Preceding station	Pakistan Railways	Following station
Kala Shah Kaku towards Kiamari	Karachi–Peshawar Line	Sadhoke towards Peshawar Cantonment
Location

Muridke Railway Station (Urdu and Punjabi: مریدکے ریلوے اسٹیشن) is located in Muridke town, of Sheikhupura district in Pakistan's Punjab province.

== See also ==
- List of railway stations in Pakistan
- Pakistan Railways
