= Gujranwala Cantonment railway station =

Railway station in Gujranwala, Pakistan

Gujranwala Cantonment Station گوجرانوالہ کینٹ ریلوے اسٹیشن
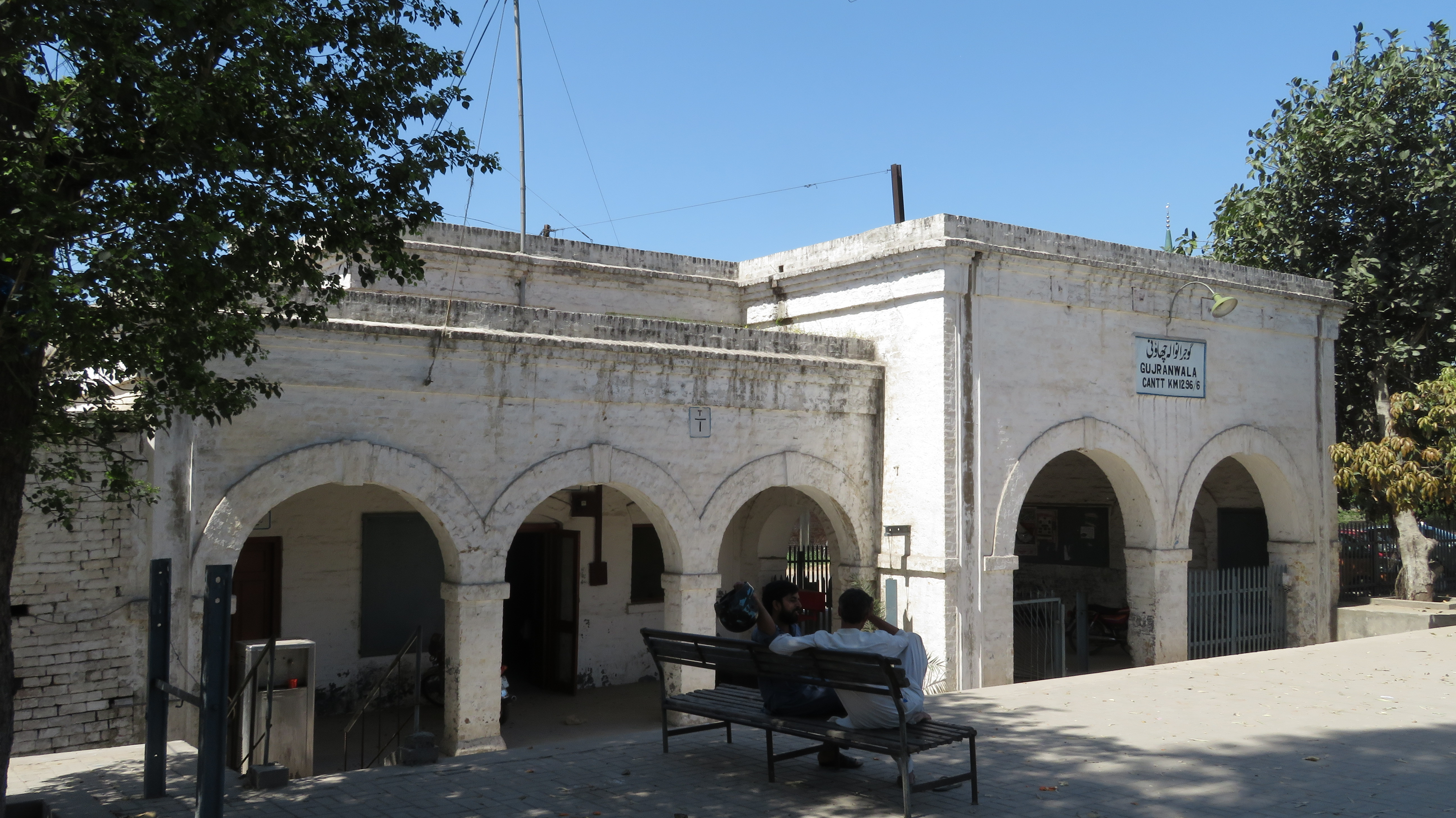

General information
- Coordinates: 32.245727°N 74.168308°E
- Owner: Ministry of Railways
- Line: Karachi–Peshawar Railway Line

Construction
- Parking: Available
- Accessible: Available

Other information
- Station code: GRWC

Services
Preceding station	Pakistan Railways	Following station
Gujranwala towards Kiamari	Karachi–Peshawar Line	Ghakkhar Mandi towards Peshawar Cantonment
Location

Gujranwala Cantonment Railway Station (Urdu and Punjabi: گوجرانوالہ کینٹ ریلوے اسٹیشن) is located in Gujranwala cantonment area, Gujranwala district of Punjab province, Pakistan.

== See also ==
- List of railway stations in Pakistan
- Pakistan Railways
- Green Town

== Services ==
Trains that stay at Gujranwala Cantt railway station
Train Number	Train Name	Origin	Destination	Arrival (Grw Cantt)	Departure (Grw Cantt)
No train stay here. Data synced through Official Website of Pakistan Railways on PST 10:12 AM June 19, 2022
