= Kala Shah Kaku railway station =

Railway station in Punjab, Pakistan

Kala Shah Kaku Station کالا شاہ کاکو ریلوے اسٹیشن
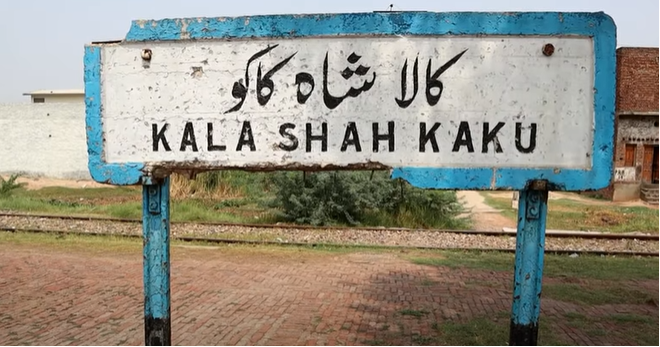

General information
- Coordinates: 31.7197°N 74.2736°E
- Owner: Ministry of Railways
- Line: Karachi–Peshawar Railway Line

Other information
- Station code: KBS

Services
Preceding station	Pakistan Railways	Following station
Shahdara Bagh Junction towards Kiamari	Karachi–Peshawar Line	Muridke towards Peshawar Cantonment
Location

Kala Shah Kaku Railway Station (Urdu and Punjabi: کالا شاہ کاکو ریلوے اسٹیشن) is located in Kala Shah Kaku town, Sheikhupura District of Punjab, Pakistan. It lies on the Karachi–Peshawar Railway Line.

In May 2025, Kala Shah Kaku was reported to be among 14 stations of Pakistan Railways' Lahore Division being converted to solar energy.

== See also ==
- List of railway stations in Pakistan
- Pakistan Railways
