= Kamoke railway station =

Railway station in Punjab, Pakistan

Kamoke Railway Station کامونکے ریلوے اسٹیشن

General information
- Coordinates: 31.9821°N 74.2262°E
- Owner: Ministry of Railways
- Line: Karachi–Peshawar Railway Line

Other information
- Station code: KAM

Services
Preceding station	Pakistan Railways	Following station
Sadhoke towards Kiamari	Karachi–Peshawar Line	Eminabad towards Peshawar Cantonment
Location

Kamoke Railway Station (Urdu and Punjabi: کامونکے ریلوے اسٹیشن) is located in Kamoke town, Gujranwala District of Punjab province, Pakistan.

== See also ==
- List of railway stations in Pakistan
- Pakistan Railways
