= Dhaunkal railway station =

Railway station in Punjab, Pakistan

Dhaunkal Railway Station دھونکل ریلوے اسٹیشن

General information
- Coordinates: 32.3833°N 74.1331°E
- Owner: Ministry of Railways
- Line: Karachi–Peshawar Railway Line

Other information
- Station code: DUX

Services
Preceding station	Pakistan Railways	Following station
Ghakkhar Mandi towards Kiamari	Karachi–Peshawar Line	Wazirabad Junction towards Peshawar Cantonment
Location

Dhaunkal Railway Station (Urdu and Punjabi: دھونکل ریلوے اسٹیشن) is located in Dhaunkal village, Gujranwala district of Punjab province of the Pakistan.

== See also ==
- List of railway stations in Pakistan
- Pakistan Railways
