= Nur Junction railway station =

Railway station in Pakistan

Nur Junction Railway Station نور جنکشن ریلوے اسٹیشن
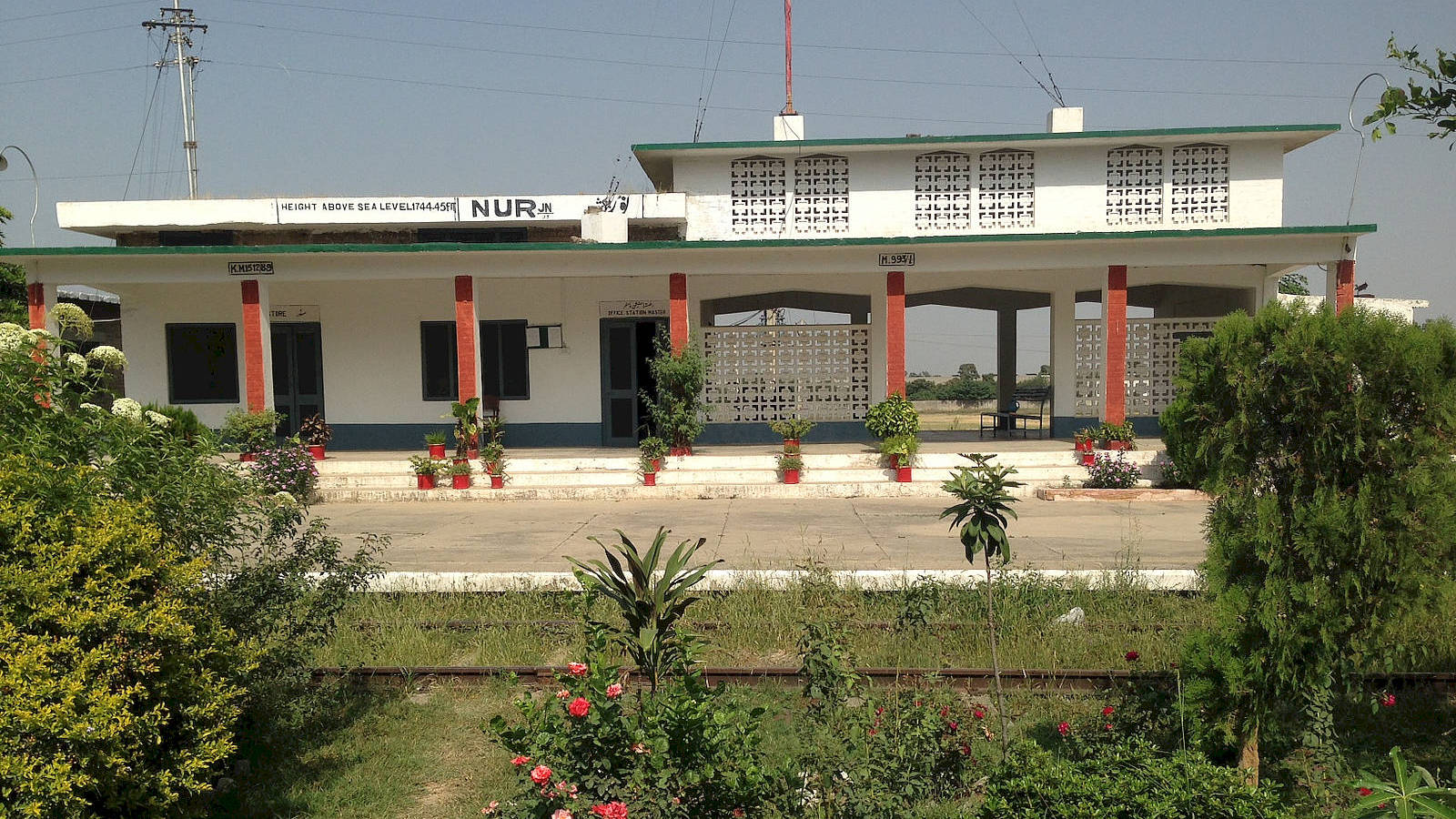
- Nur railway station, from platform 2

General information
- Coordinates: 33.6289°N 73.0132°E
- Owner: Ministry of Railways
- Lines: Karachi–Peshawar Railway Line; Islamabad–Muzaffarabad Branch Line
- Platforms: 2
- Tracks: 4

Other information
- Station code: NQU

History
- Opened: 1969

Services
Preceding station	Pakistan Railways	Following station
Rawalpindi towards Kiamari	Karachi–Peshawar Line	Madina-Tul-Hijjaj towards Peshawar Cantonment
Terminus	Islamabad–Muzaffarabad Branch Line	Islamabad Terminus
Location

Nur Junction Railway Station (Urdu: نور جنکشن ریلوے اسٹیشن) is located close to Karnal Sher Khan Road (formerly IJP Road) in I-12 sector of Islamabad, Pakistan. The station was constructed in 1969. It is the only junction railway station in Pakistan, which has no schedule stoppage of any train. The station serves as a junction for Margalla railway station and Carriage Factory Islamabad (CFI).

== See also ==
- List of railway stations in Pakistan
- Pakistan Railways
