= Eminabad railway station =

Railway station in Punjab, Pakistan

Eminabad Railway Station ایمن آباد ریلوے اسٹیشن
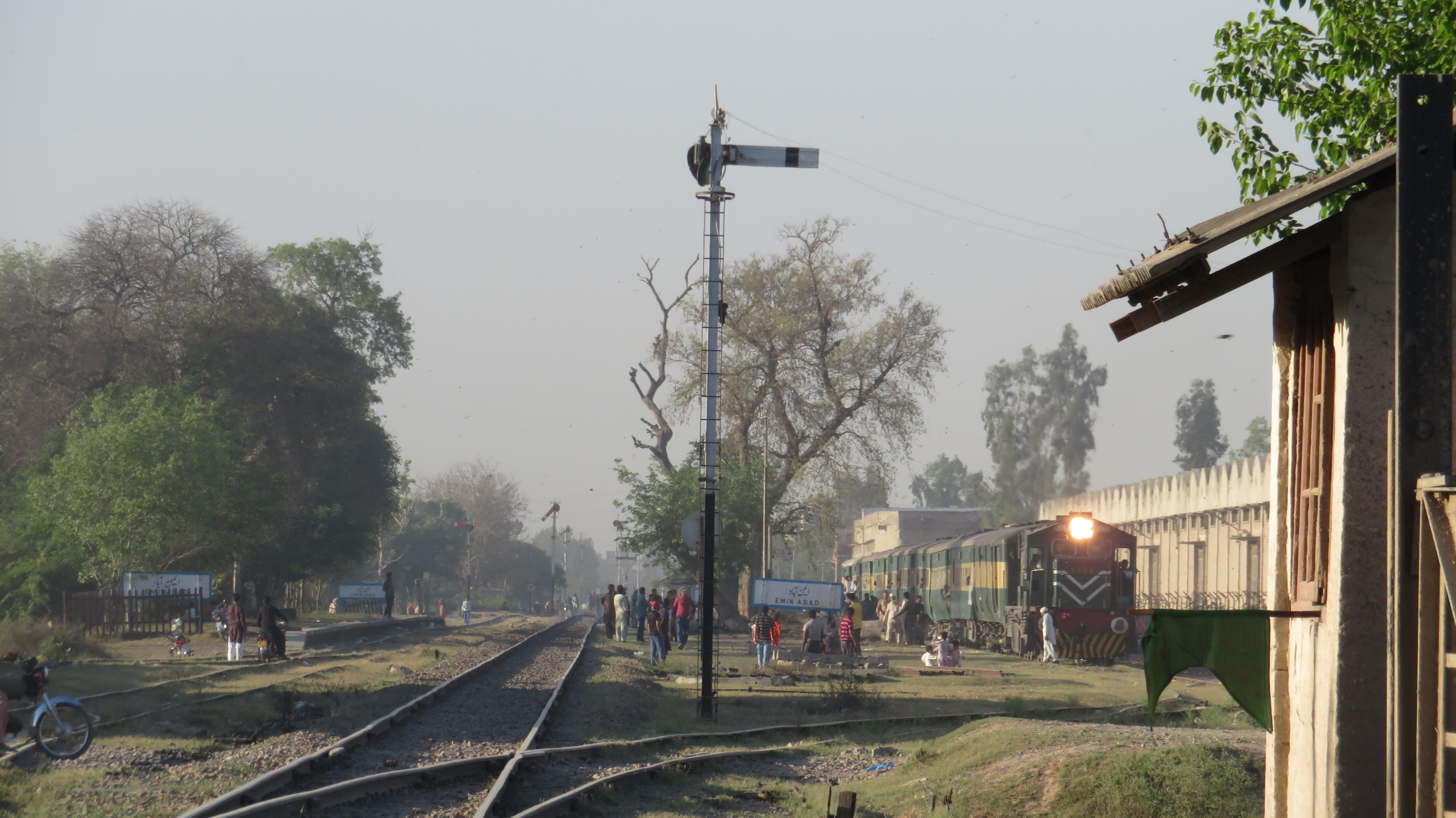

General information
- Coordinates: 32.0547°N 74.2109°E
- Owner: Ministry of Railways
- Line: Karachi–Peshawar Railway Line

Other information
- Station code: EMBD

Services
Preceding station	Pakistan Railways	Following station
Kamoke towards Kiamari	Karachi–Peshawar Line	Gujranwala City towards Peshawar Cantonment
Location

Eminabad Railway Station (Urdu and Punjabi: ایمن آباد ریلوے اسٹیشن) is located in Eminabad town, Gujranwala district of Punjab province, Pakistan.

== See also ==
- List of railway stations in Pakistan
- Pakistan Railways
