= Kala Gujran railway station =

Railway station in Punjab, Pakistan

Kala Gujran Railway Station کالا گجراں ریلوے اسٹیشن

General information
- Coordinates: 32.9628°N 73.6949°E
- Owner: Ministry of Railways
- Line: Karachi–Peshawar Railway Line

Other information
- Station code: KAX

Services
Preceding station	Pakistan Railways	Following station
Jhelum towards Kiamari	Karachi–Peshawar Line	Kaluwal towards Peshawar Cantonment
Location

Kala Gujran Railway Station (Urdu and Punjabi: کالا گجراں ریلوے اسٹیشن) is an abandoned railway station located in Kala Gujran village, Jhelum district of Punjab province, Pakistan.

== See also ==
- List of railway stations in Pakistan
- Pakistan Railways
