= Subak Kharam =

Pakistani passenger train

Overview
- Service type: Passenger
- Current operator: Pakistan Railways
- Website: www.pakrail.gov.pk

Route
- Termini: Lahore Jn; Rawalpindi
- Stops: 7
- Distance travelled: 290 kilometres (180 mi)
- Average journey time: 5 hours and 10 minutes
- Service frequency: Daily
- Train numbers: 103 UP (Lahore->Rawalpindi), 104 DN (Rawalpindi->Lahore)

On-board services
- Classes: Economy Class; AC Standard; AC Business; Parlour Car
- Seating arrangements: Available
- Sleeping arrangements: Available
- Catering facilities: Available
- Baggage facilities: Available

Technical
- Track gauge: Broad Gauge

Subak Kharam (Urdu: سبک خرام) is a daily passenger train service between Lahore and Rawalpindi in Pakistan. Subak Kharam means stylish runner. It is run by NCS rail.

The Subak Kharam runs between Lahore and Rawalpindi on a regular basis. Subak Kharam is a fashionable runner. It has Economy, AC Standard, AC Business and AC Parlour coaches. It travels 290 kilometers from Lahore to Rawalpindi in 5 hours and 10 minutes.

== Route ==
Lahore to Rawalpindi via Wazirabad and Jhelum

== Train stops ==
- Lahore Jn
- Gujranwala
- Wazirabad Jn
- Gujrat
- Lalamusa Jn
- Jhelum
- Gujar Khan
- Chaklala
- Rawalpindi
