= Nur–Muzaffarabad Branch Line =

Uncompleted railway line in Pakistan

Overview
- Native name: اسلام آباد–مُظفّر آباد ثانوی ریل راستہ
- Owner: Pakistan Railways
- Termini: Nur Junction; Muzaffarabad
- Stations: 2

Service
- Operator(s): Pakistan Railways

History
- Commenced: 1979; 46 years ago

Technical
- Line length: 128 km (80 mi) Proposed; 6 km (3.7 mi) Built

Nur–Muzaffarabad Branch Line is one of several railway lines in Pakistan semi-proposed by Pakistan Railways. The semi-proposed 128 km (80 mi) line begins at Nur Junction on the Karachi–Peshawar Railway Line and will end at Muzaffarabad in Azad Jammu & Kashmir.

== History ==
Construction on the 128-kilometre (80 mi) railway line began in 1979, where the new branch line diverged from the Karachi–Peshawar Railway Line at Nur station. The line then headed in an eastern direction towards sector I-9 in Islamabad where Islamabad railway station was constructed. Following the line reaching Islamabad, work was suspended in 1980. In April 2016, the Ministry of Railways began a feasibility study to restart construction of the line. Pending completion, planning and pre-construction design work, the project will be ready to go ahead pending market interest and planning approval. The extension of the line will continue in a northeast direction from Islamabad towards Murree and Bhurban before turning north and running parallel with the Jhelum River. At Kohala, the line would cross over the Jhelum River into Azad Jammu & Kashmir and continue north to Muzaffarabad.

== Stations ==
Active Line

- Nur Junction
- Margalla

Proposed Line

- Bhara Kahu
- Samblan
- Khajut
- Murree
- Bhurban
- Dewal Shareef
- Birote
- Kohala
- Muzaffarabad

== See also ==
- Karachi–Peshawar Railway Line
- Railway lines in Pakistan
