= Margalla railway station =

Railway station in Islamabad, Pakistan

Margalla Railway Station مارگلہ ریلوے سٹیشن
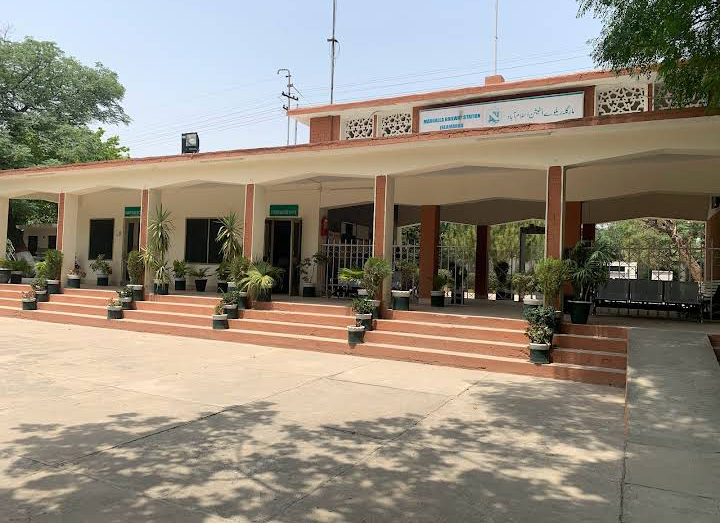

General information
- Location: Khayaban-i-Jauhar, Sector H-9, Islamabad, Capital Territory. 44000; Pakistan
- Coordinates: 33.663653°N 73.048182°E
- Owner: Ministry of Railways
- Line: Islamabad–Muzaffarabad Branch Line
- Platforms: 1
- Tracks: 2
- Connections: Bus stand, Metrobus, Taxicab stand, Autorickshaw

Construction
- Platform levels: 1
- Parking: Available
- Accessible: Available

Other information
- Status: Operational Functional
- Station code: MGLA
- Fare zone: Pakistan Railways Rawalpindi Zone

History
- Opened: 21 November 1979
- Rebuilt: 13 May 2009 (reopened)

Services
| Preceding station | Pakistan Railways | Following station |
|---|---|---|
| Nur (Rawalpindi) Terminus | Islamabad–Muzaffarabad Branch Line | Terminus |
Location
- Location within Pakistan

Margalla Railway Station (Urdu: مارگلہ ریلوے اسٹیشن) (formerly Islamabad Railway Station) is located between Khayaban-i-Jauhar (Sector H-9) and Service Road North (Sector I-9) in Islamabad, Capital Territory, Pakistan. The entrance to the station is from Khayaban-i-Jauhar side.

== History ==
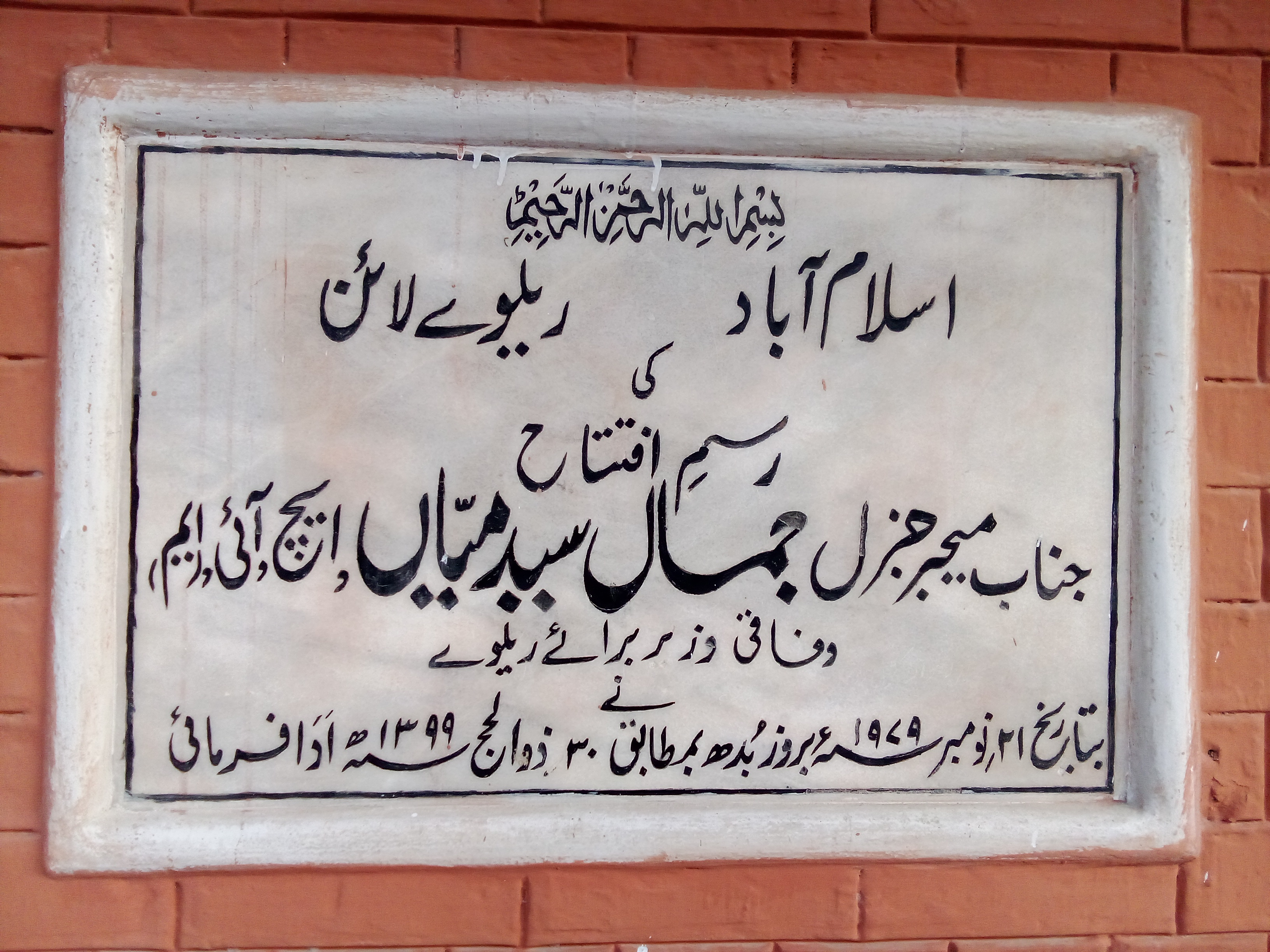
Inauguration plaque of Islamabad railway line fixed on the building of Margalla railway station in Islamabad. The railway line had been inaugurated by Pakistan's then railway minister Major General Jamal Said Mian (HIM) on 21 November 1979.

The station was established and inaugurated on 21 November 1979 by Minister for Railways Major General Jamal Said Mian. A rail shuttle was started between Islamabad and Rawalpindi. The shuttle was suspended within a year due to financial loss and the station was closed down. In 1988, freight train services were started from this railway station, but the service was suspended after a while. The station was shut for the next 29 years.

As a result of an increase in the population and commercial activities of Islamabad, the station was renovated. It was also renamed to Islamabad railway station. Operations started from 21 April 2009 on trial basis. Railways Minister Ghulam Ahmad Bilour inaugurated it on 13 May 2009. Later, the railway station's name was once again reverted to Margalla railway station.

On 15 May 2015, a new express train named Green Line Express was launched at the station, linking Islamabad to Karachi. At present, two trains depart from Margalla railway station which are Green Line Express and Islamabad Express.

== Connections ==
The nearest Khayaban-e-Johar Metrobus Station, part of the Rawalpindi-Islamabad Metrobus, is 17 mins (1.4 km) walk away.

== Gallery ==
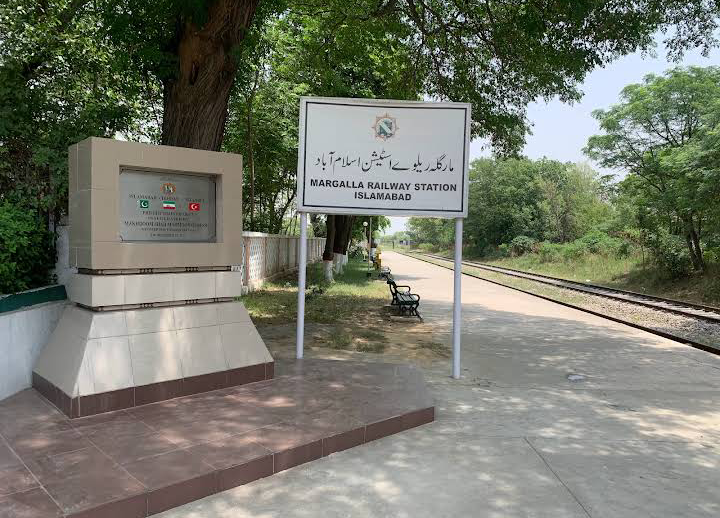

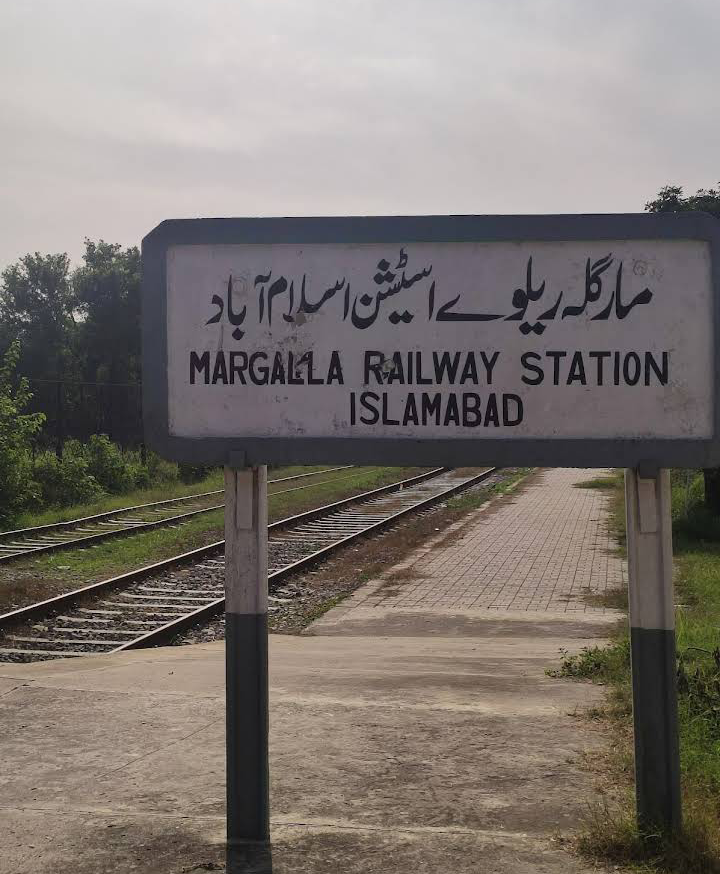

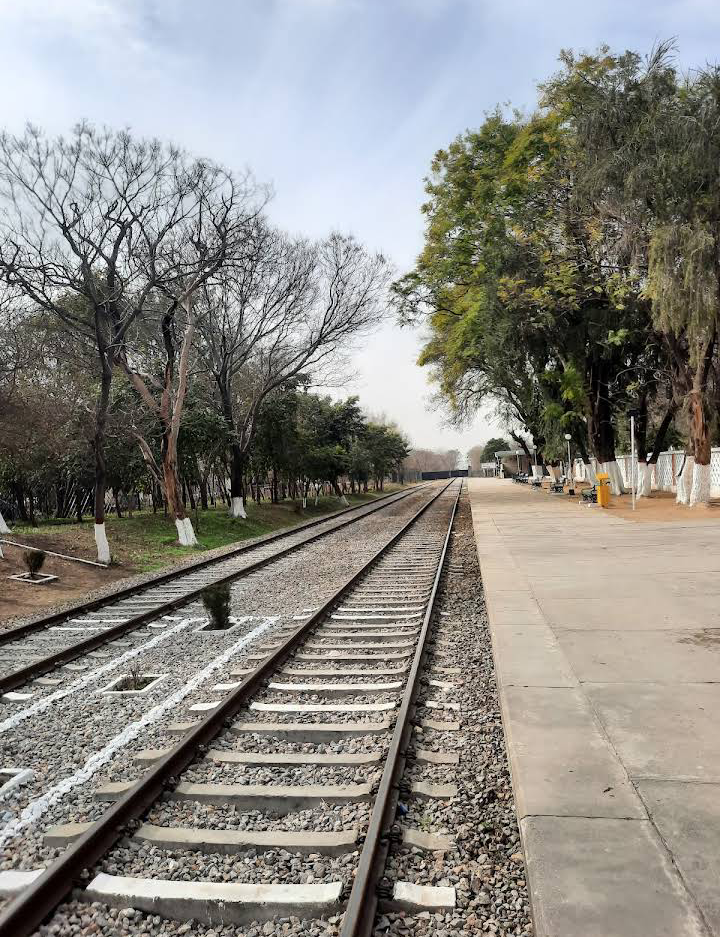

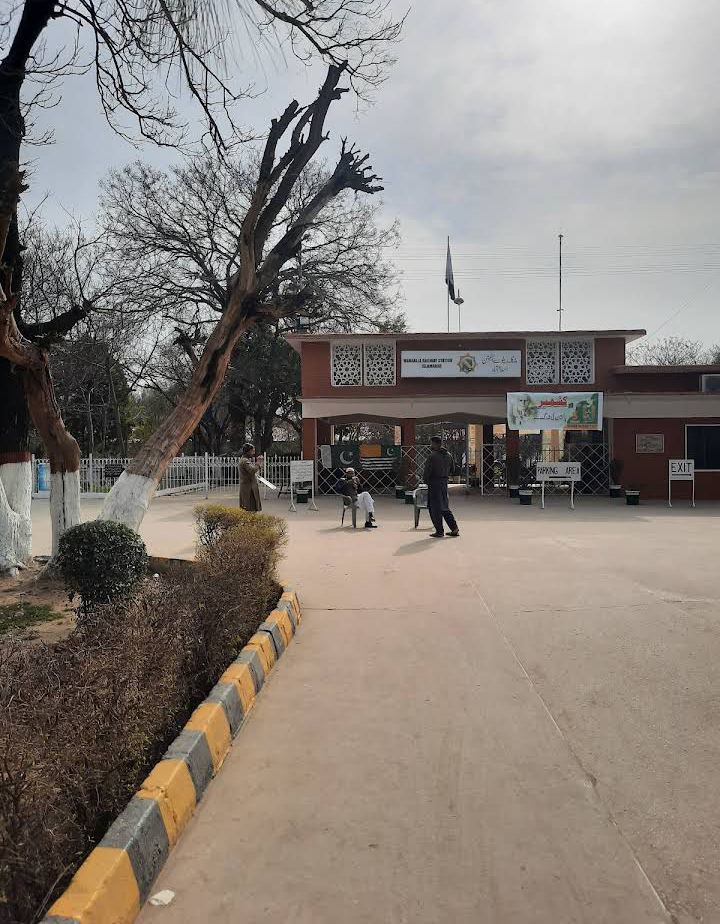

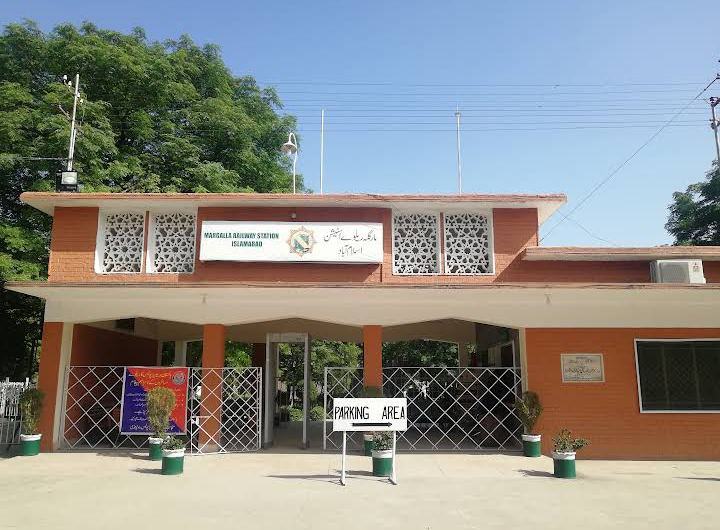

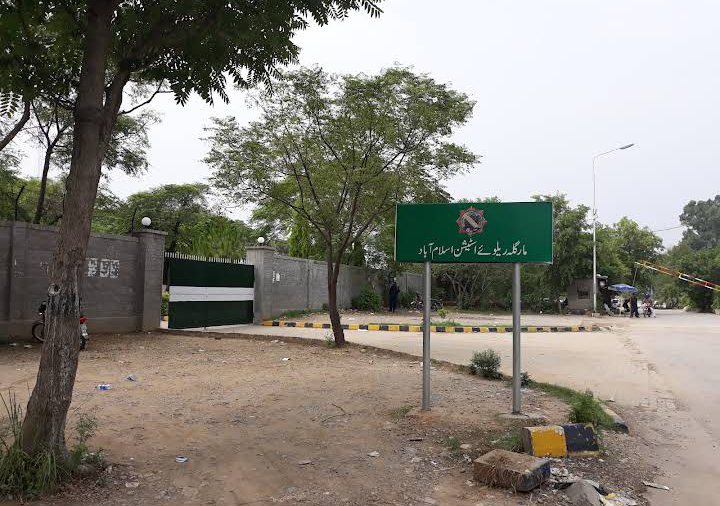

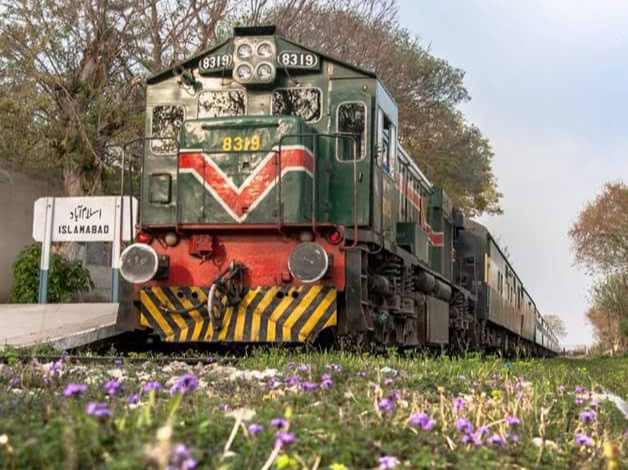

== See also ==
- List of railway stations in Pakistan
- Pakistan Railways
- Green Line Express
