= Sadhoke railway station =

Railway station in Punjab, Pakistan

Sadhoke Railway Station سادھوکے ریلوے اسٹیشن

General information
- Coordinates: 31°53′25.3242″N 74°14′34.5876″E
- Owner: Ministry of Railways
- Line: Karachi–Peshawar Railway Line
- Platforms: 01
- Tracks: 02

Construction
- Structure type: Standard

Other information
- Station code: SDQ

Services
Preceding station	Pakistan Railways	Following station
Muridke towards Kiamari	Karachi–Peshawar Line	Kamoke towards Peshawar Cantonment
Location

Sadhoke Railway Station (Urdu and Punjabi: سادھوکے ریلوے اسٹیشن) is located in Sadhoke town of Gujranwala district in Pakistan's Punjab province.

== See also ==
- List of railway stations in Pakistan
- Pakistan Railways
