= Ghakhar Mandi railway station =

Railway station in Ghakhar Mandi, Pakistan

Ghakhar Mandi Station گکھڑ منڈی ریلوے اسٹیشن
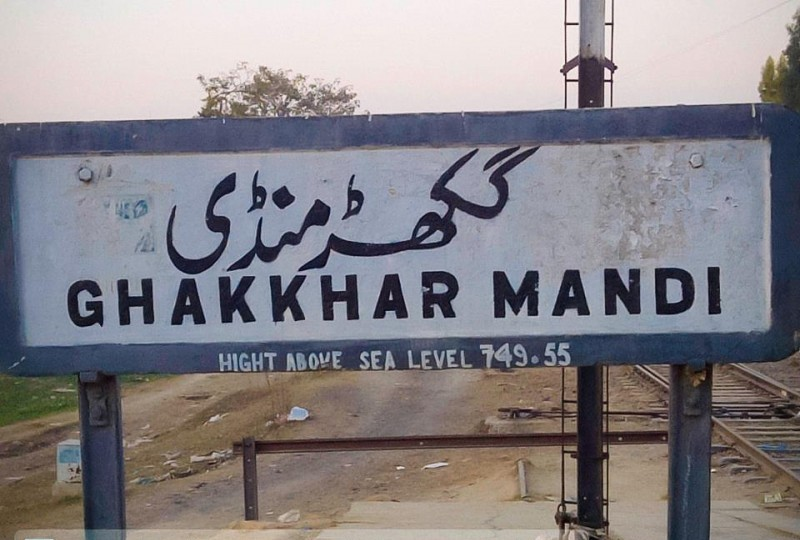

General information
- Location: Ghakhar Mandi; Gujranwala District, Punjab; Pakistan
- Coordinates: 32.3019°N 74.1522°E
- Owner: Ministry of Railways
- Line: Karachi–Peshawar Railway Line
- Distance: 1,306 km (812 mi) from Kiamari; 380 km (240 mi) from Peshawar Cantt

Other information
- Station code: GKR

Services
Preceding station	Pakistan Railways	Following station
Gujranwala Cantonment towards Kiamari	Karachi–Peshawar Line	Dhaunkal towards Peshawar Cantonment
Location

Ghakhar Mandi Railway Station (Urdu and Punjabi: گکھڑ منڈی ریلوے اسٹیشن) is located in Ghakhar Mandi village, Gujranwala district of Punjab province, Pakistan.

== See also ==
- List of railway stations in Pakistan
- Pakistan Railways
