= Chaklala railway station =

Railway station in Pakistan

Chaklala railway station چک لالہ ریلوے اسٹیشن
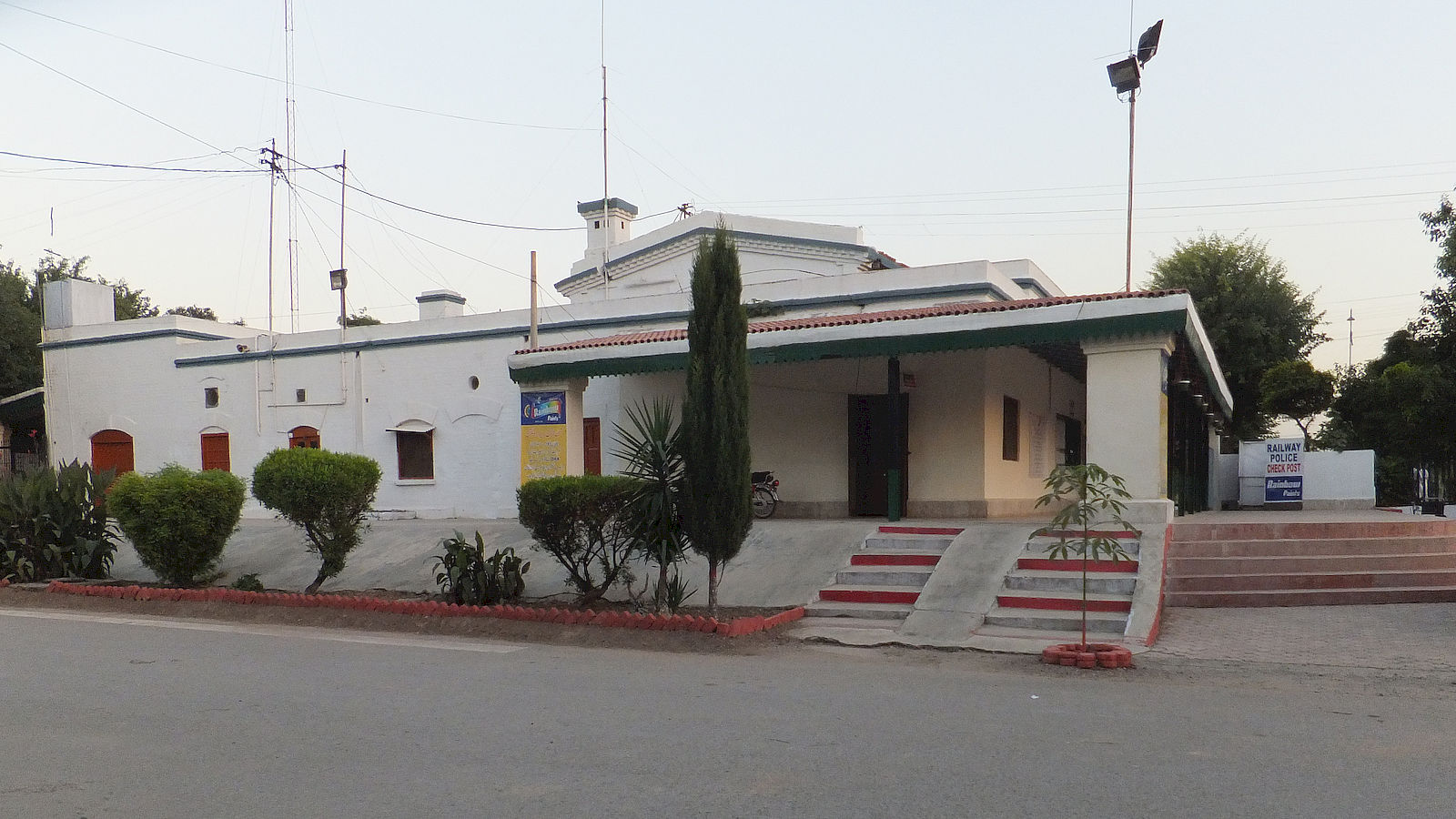
- Chaklala railway station main building

General information
- Location: Chaklala; Punjab; Pakistan
- Coordinates: 33.6006°N 73.0960°E
- Elevation: 1,312 metres (4,304 ft)
- Owner: Ministry of Railways
- Line: Karachi–Peshawar Railway Line
- Platforms: 3
- Tracks: 3

Construction
- Parking: Available

Other information
- Station code: CKL

History
- Opened: 1879

Services
Preceding station	Pakistan Railways	Following station
Sihala towards Kiamari	Karachi–Peshawar Line	Rawalpindi towards Peshawar Cantonment
Location

Chaklala railway station (Urdu: چک لالہ ریلوے اسٹیشن) is a railway terminal located at the convergence of Rawalpindi and Islamabad, Pakistan. Constructed in 1879 during the British Raj, the station serves as a secondary hub for the twin cities, often utilized by passengers seeking to bypass the congestion of the main Rawalpindi railway station.

== History ==
Following the British deployment of railway infrastructure in the northern Indian subcontinent in the 1870s, the station was established in what was then a dense forest area. Its original primary function was the freight transport of timber to other regions, as well as serving passengers from surrounding villages.

The establishment of the station also impacted the development of Chaklala, transforming it from an obscure village into a major settlement due its proximity to British military cantonments and garrison areas, such as Gracy Lines.

In 2006, during the tenure of President Pervez Musharraf, a proposal was drafted to launch a metro train service connecting Chaklala to Margalla. The plan was intended to serve passengers arriving at the nearby old airport, located one kilometer away. However, the project was abandoned due to the absence of a dedicated track between Rawalpindi and Islamabad.

== Facilities ==
The station building retains its original 19th-century colonial architectural style, constructed from traditional grey sandstone blocks. The station houses vintage furniture, machinery, an antique clock, and kerosene-lit signal lamps. A manual bell is still utilized to signal train arrivals and departures.

A steel pedestrian bridge connects the platforms, and a historic wooden parking shed, originally designed for tongas (horse-drawn carriages), remains in use for motorcycles.

== Operations ==
As of 2025, the station handles around 26 trains daily. It functioned as a dry port until 2006, after which operations were relocated to the Margalla railway station in Islamabad.

== Gallery ==
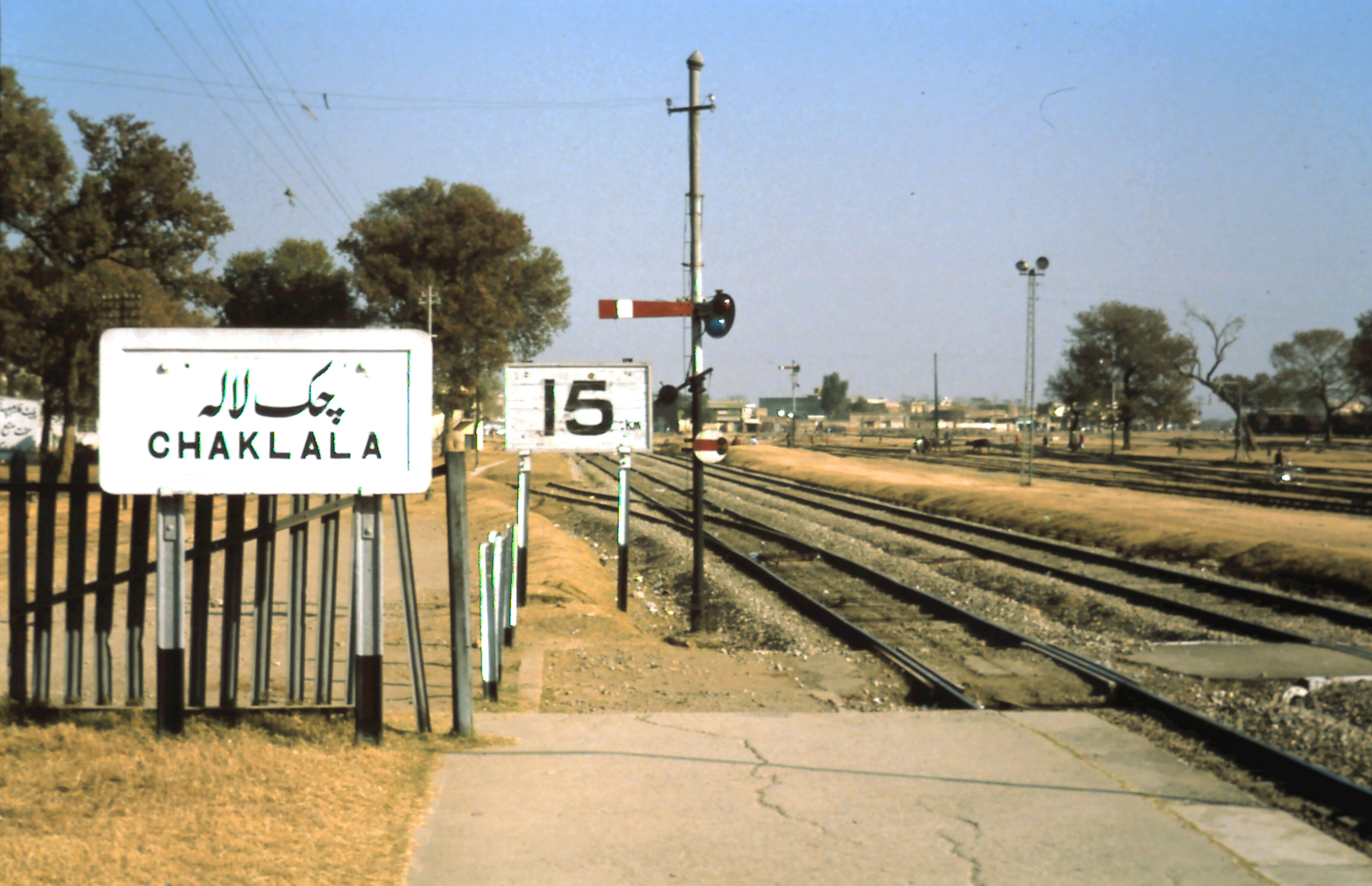

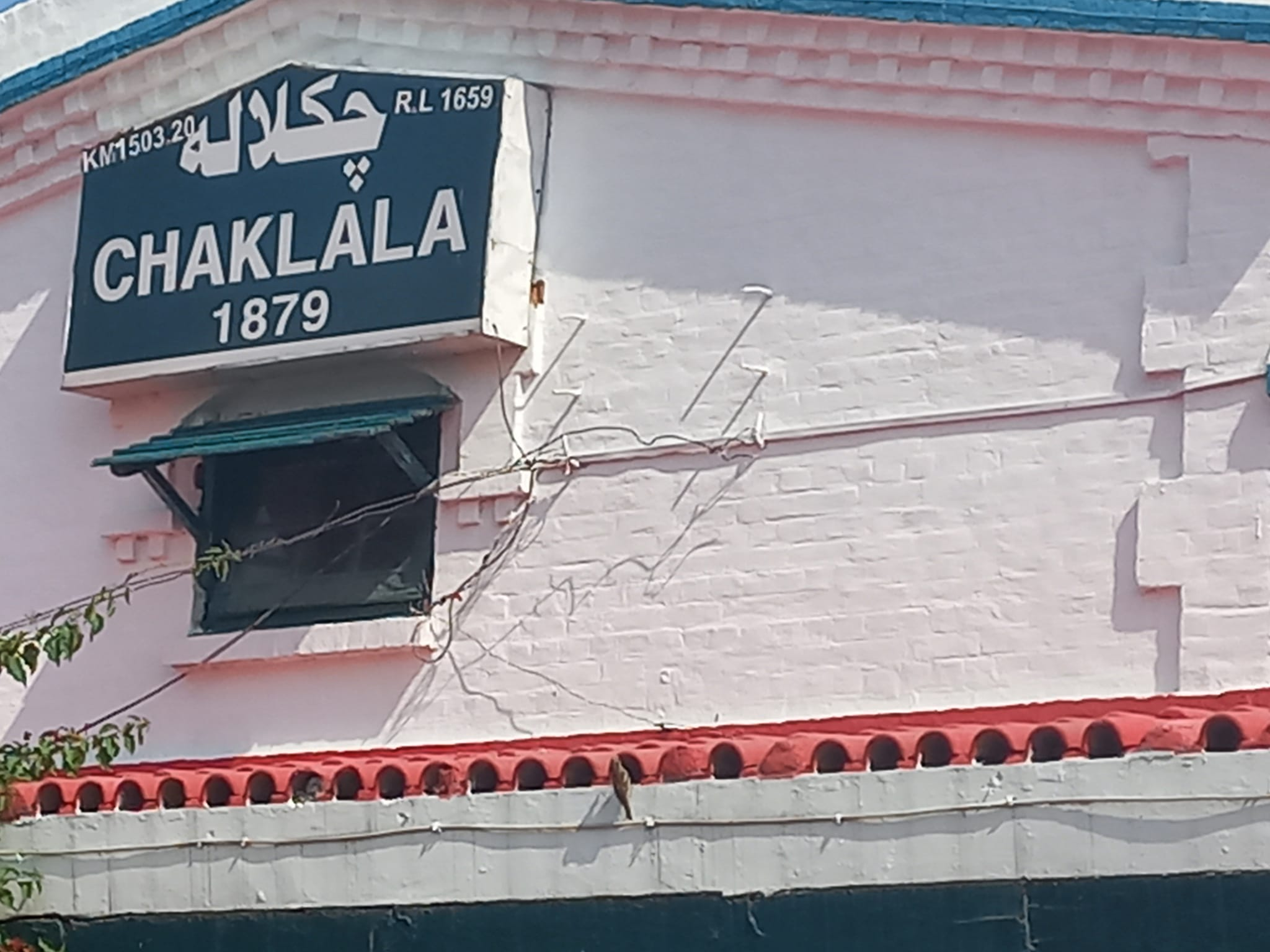

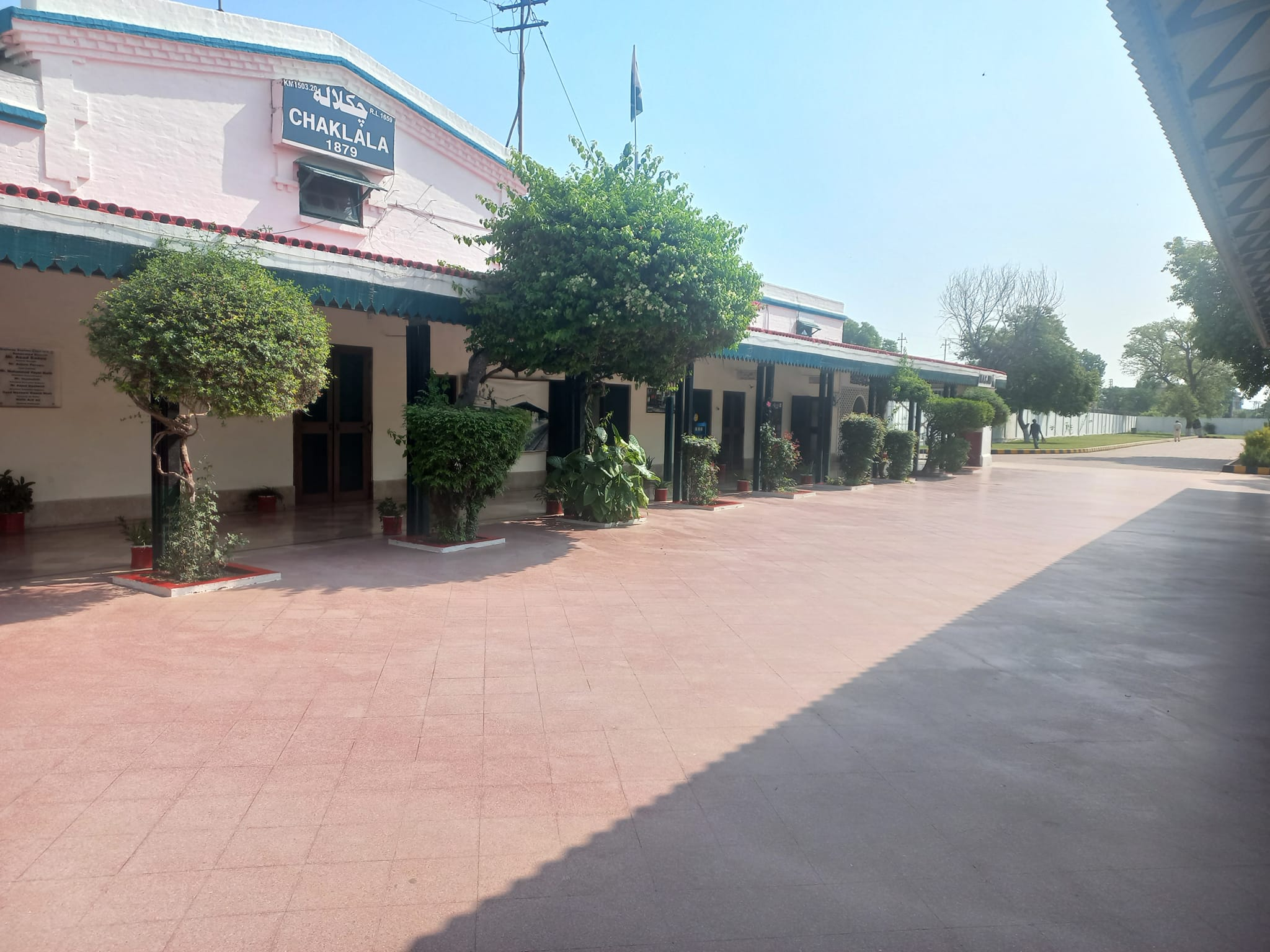

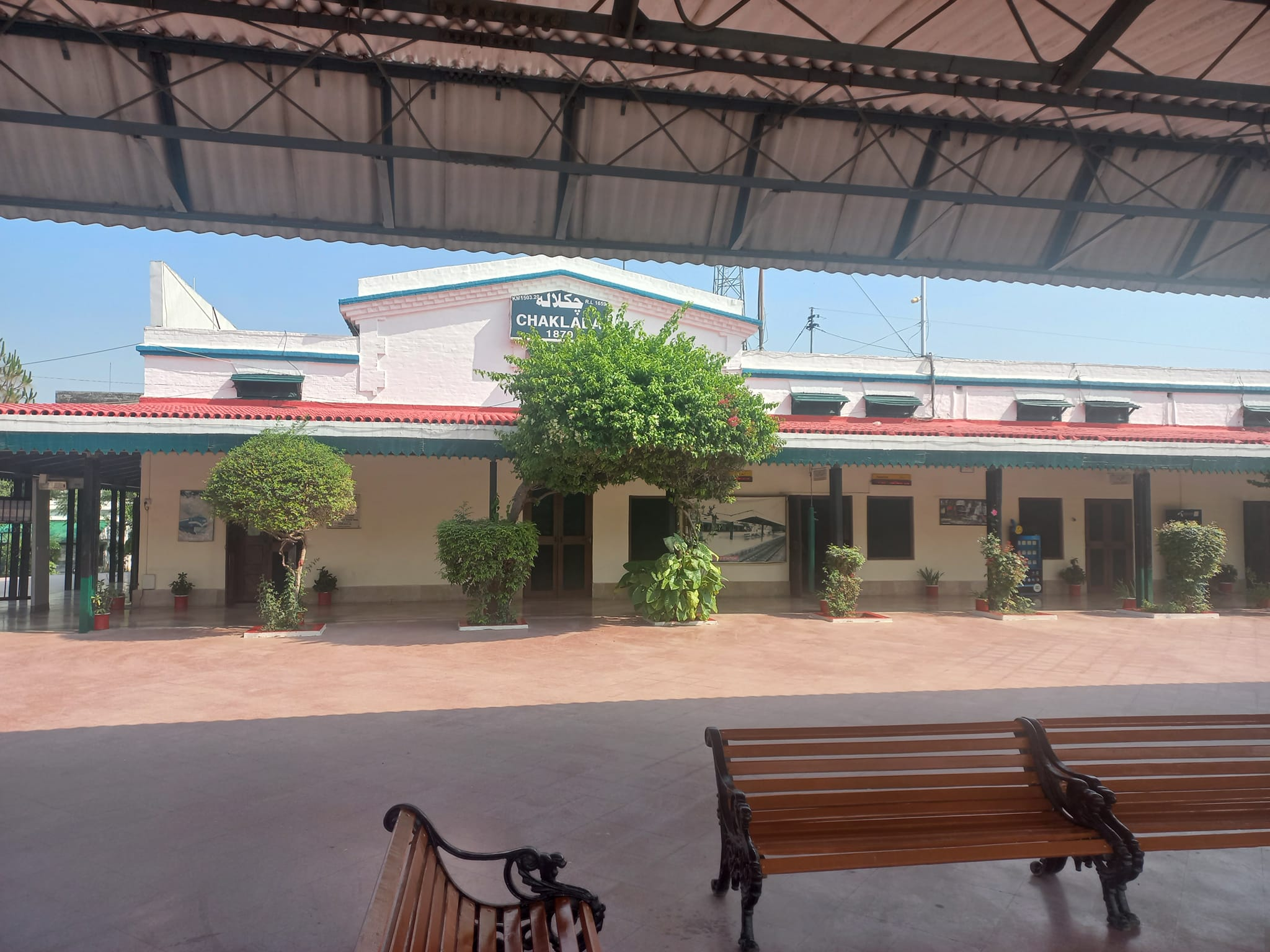

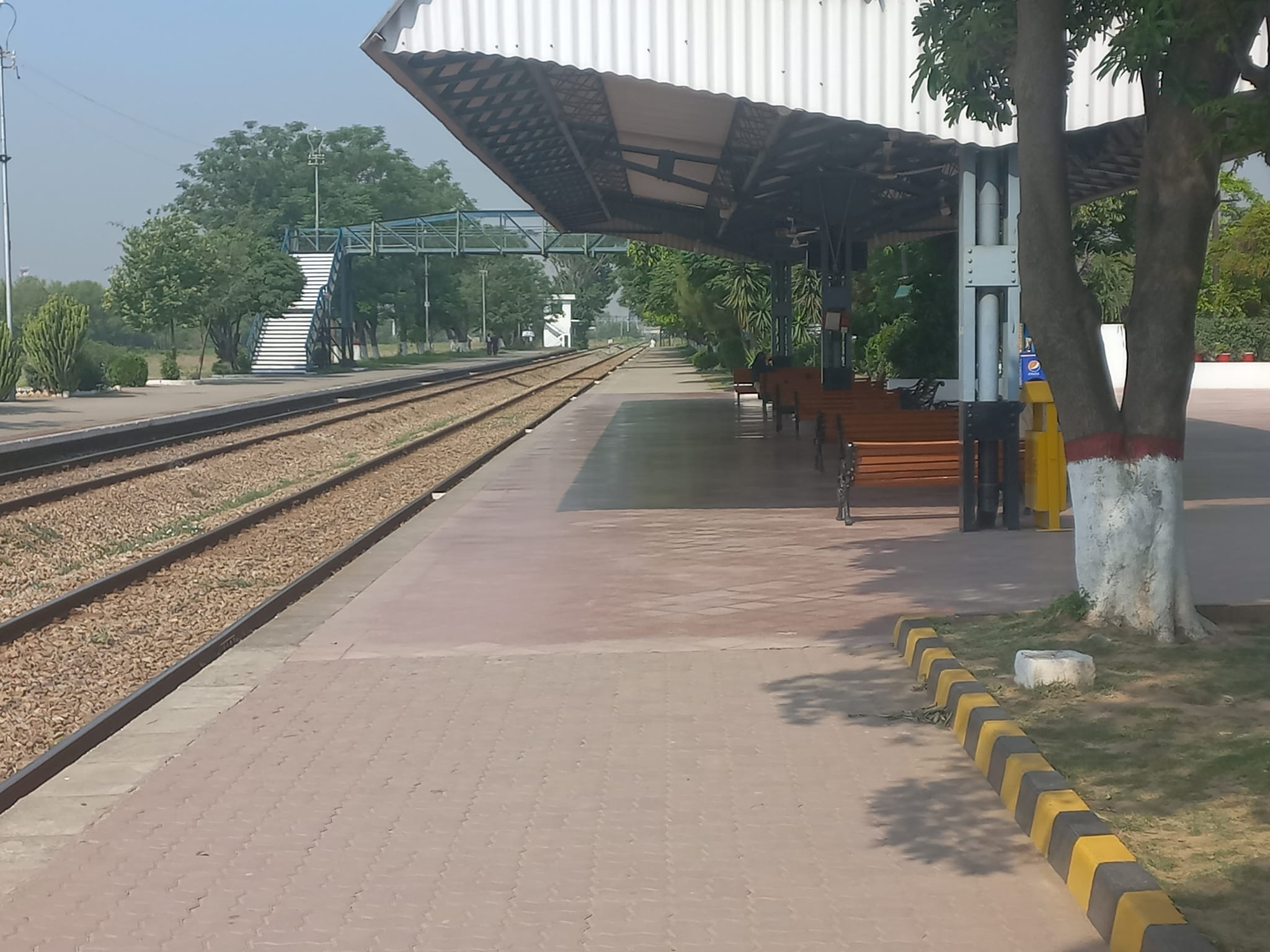

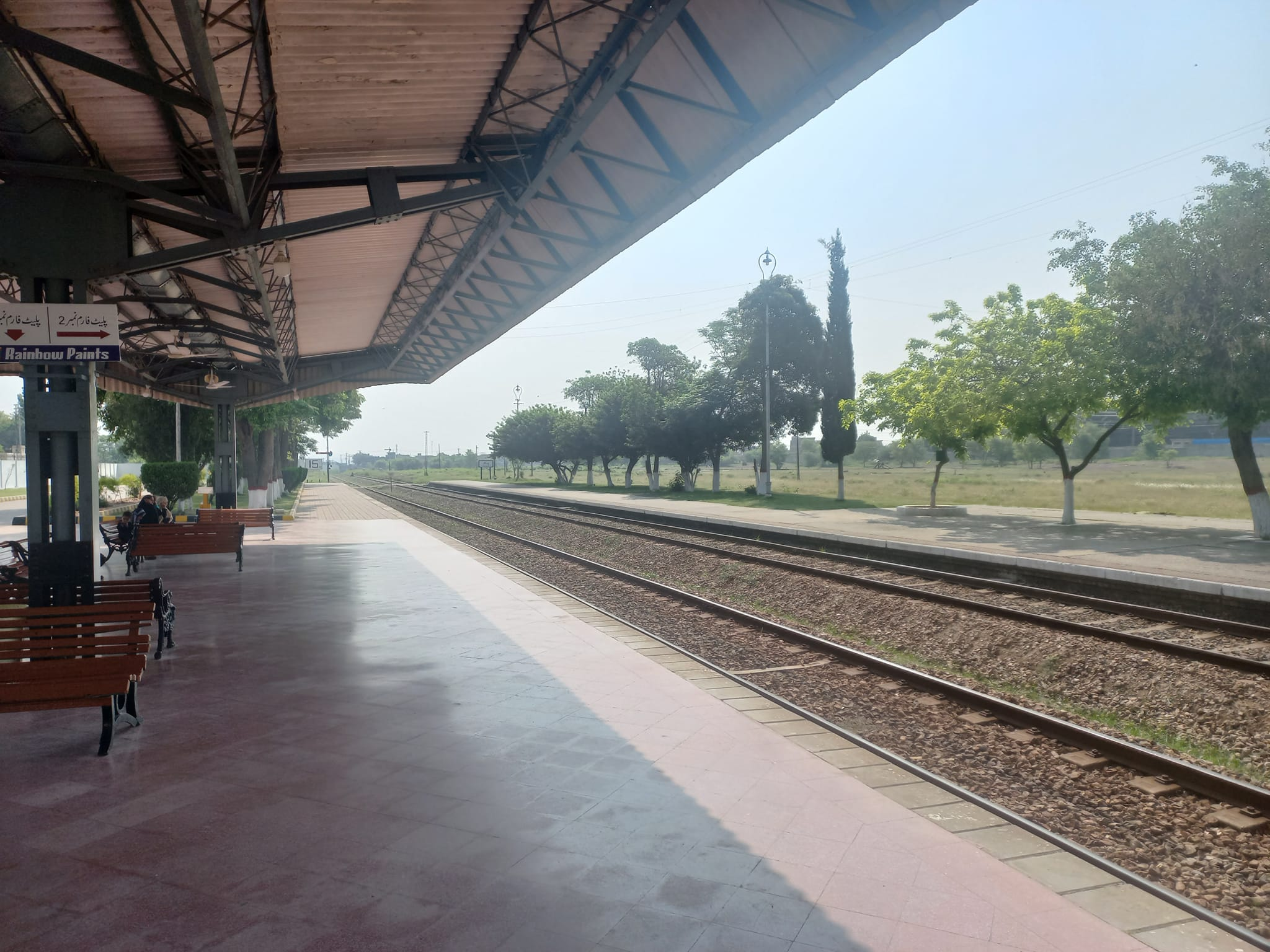

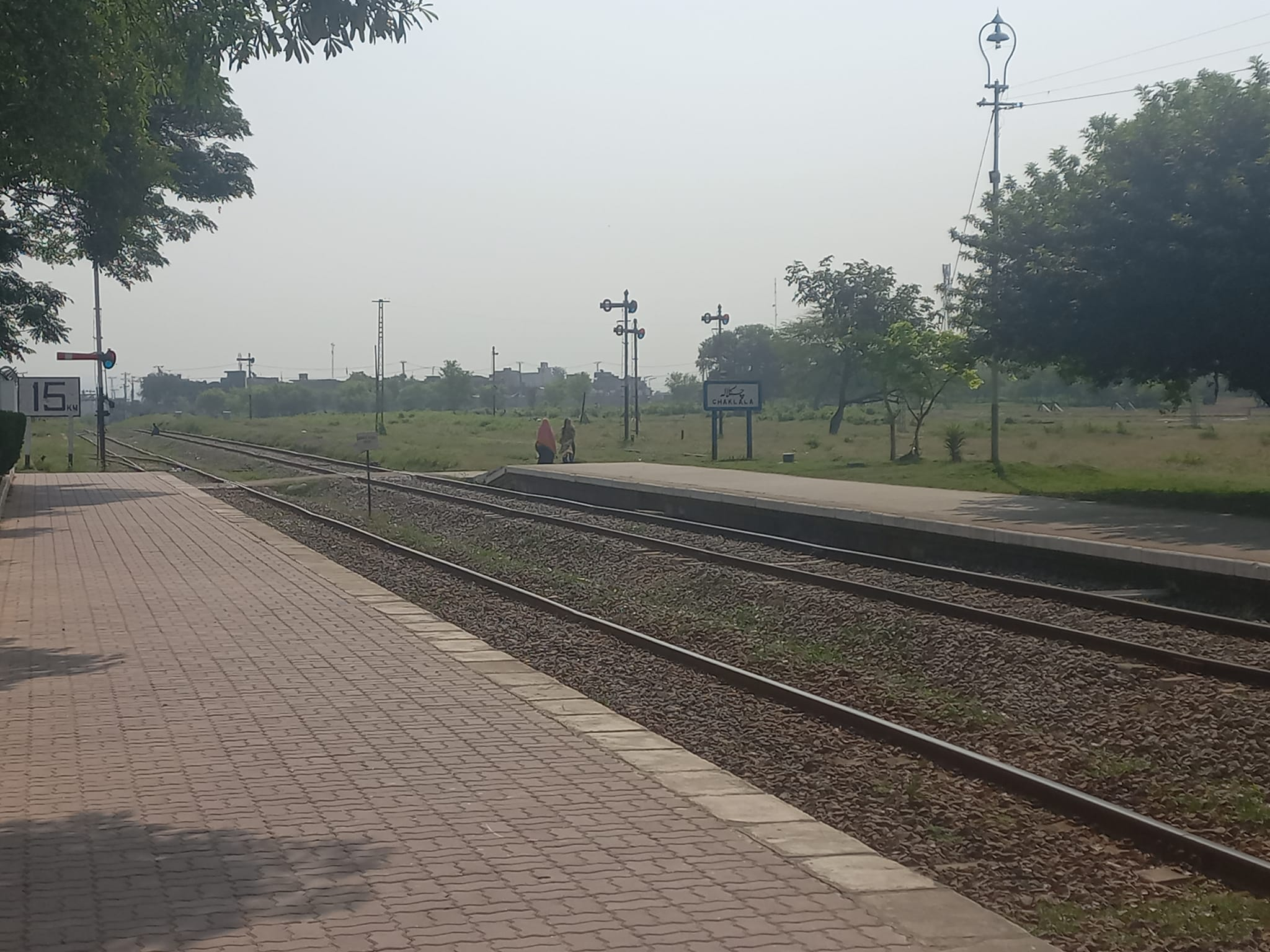

== See also ==
- List of railway stations in Pakistan
- Pakistan Railways
