= Hazara Express =

Pakistani passenger train

Overview
- Service type: Inter-city rail
- Predecessor: Chenab Express
- First service: 2006

Route
- Termini: Karachi City; Havelian
- Stops: 50
- Distance travelled: 1,594 kilometres (990 mi)
- Average journey time: 33 hours
- Service frequency: Daily
- Train numbers: 11UP (Karachi→Havelian); 12DN (Havelian→Karachi)

On-board services
- Class: Economy AC standard
- Sleeping arrangements: Available
- Catering facilities: Non-Available

Technical
- Track gauge: 1,676 mm (5 ft 6 in)
- Track owner: Pakistan Railways
Route map
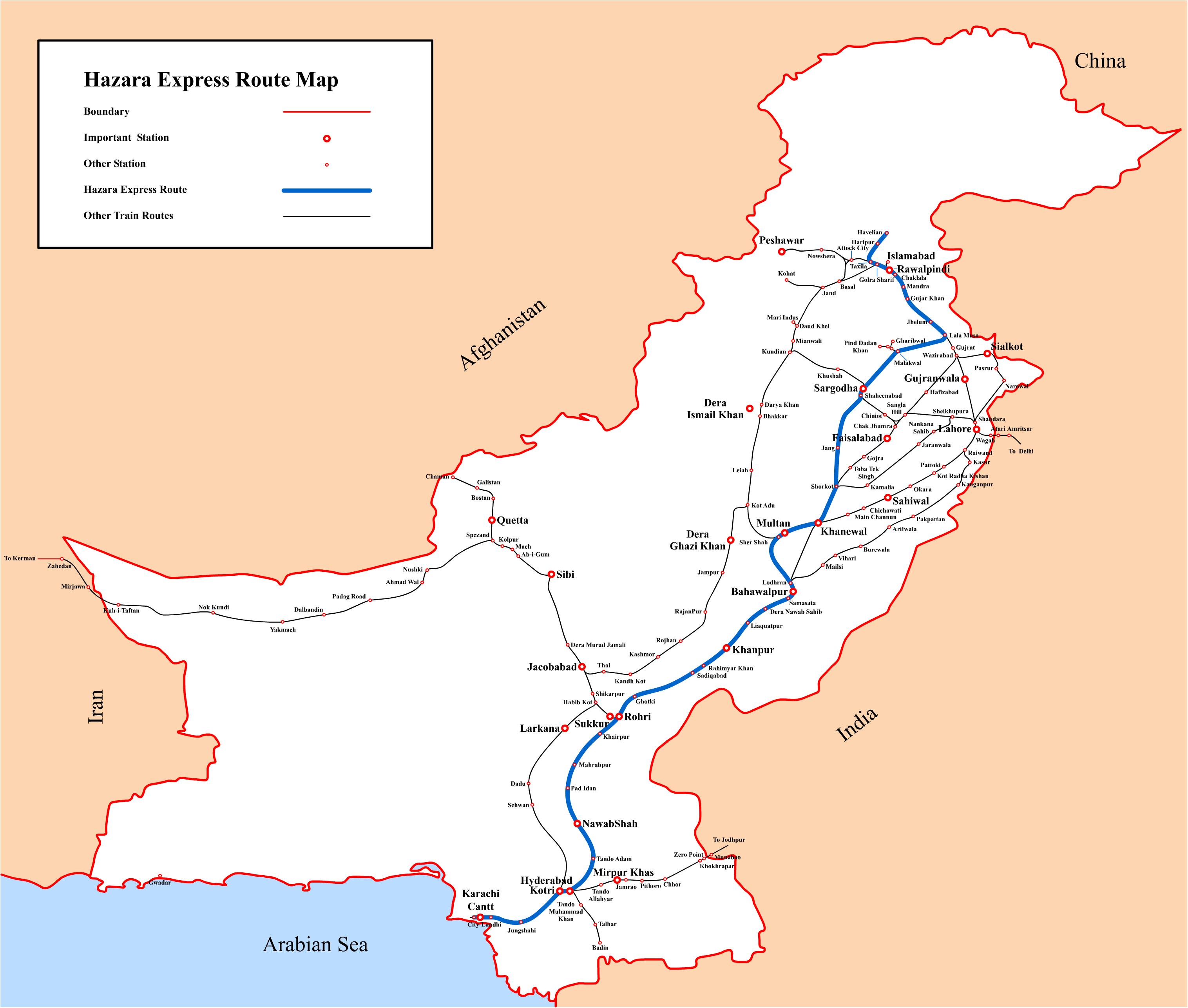
- Hazara Express route map

Hazara Express (Hindko/Urdu: ہزارہ ایکسپریس) is a passenger train operated daily by Pakistan Railways between Karachi and Havelian in Khyber Pakhtunkhwa province. The trip takes approximately 33 hours to cover a published distance of 1,594 kilometres (990 mi), travelling along a stretch of the Karachi–Peshawar Railway Line, Khanewal–Wazirabad Branch Line, Shorkot–Lalamusa Branch Line and Taxila–Khunjerab Railway Line.

== History ==
The Hazara Express was originally called the Chenab Express before 2006 and it ran between Karachi and Peshawar via Lala Musa, Faisalabad and Multan.

In the year 2021, a collision between two trains occurred in the Sindh province, resulting in the loss of a minimum of 40 lives and causing injuries to numerous individuals.

On 6 August 2023, the train derailed while going from Karachi to Havelian, killing at least 30 people and injuring at least 100. Reports from local media indicate that approximately 150 individuals had died in similar incidents during the period from 2013 to 2019.

== Route ==
- Karachi City–Khanewal Junction via Karachi–Peshawar Railway Line
- Khanewal Junction–Shorkot Cantonment Junction via Khanewal–Wazirabad Branch Line
- Shorkot Cantonment Junction–Lala Musa Junction via Shorkot–Lalamusa Branch Line
- Lala Musa Junction–Taxila Cantonment Junction via Karachi–Peshawar Railway Line
- Taxila Cantonment Junction–Havelian via Taxila–Khunjerab Railway Line

== Station stops ==
- Karachi City
- Karachi Cantonment
- Drigh Road
- Landhi Junction
- Kotri Junction
- Hyderabad Junction
- Tando Adam Junction
- Shahdadpur
- Nawabshah
- Pad Idan Junction
- Bhiria Road
- Mahrabpur Junction
- Gambat
- Khairpur
- Rohri Junction
- Pano Akil
- Ghotki
- Mirpur Mathelo
- Daharki
- Sadiqabad
- Rahim Yar Khan
- Khanpur Junction
- Liaquatpur
- Dera Nawab Sahib
- Mubarakpur
- Samasata Junction
- Bahawalpur
- Lodhran Junction
- Shujabad
- Multan Cantonment
- Khanewal Junction
- Abdul Hakim
- Shorkot Cantonment Junction
- Jhang Sadar
- Sillanwali
- Shahinabad Junction
- Sargodha Junction
- Bhalwal
- Phularwan
- Malakwal Junction
- Mandi Bahauddin
- Dinga
- Lala Musa Junction
- Jhelum
- Gujar Khan
- Rawalpindi
- Golra Sharif Junction
- Taxila Cantonment
- Kot Najib Ullah
- Haripur Hazara
- Baldher
- Havelian

== Equipment ==
The train had economy-class accommodation and 1 air-conditioned coach.
