= Taxila Cantonment =

Army cantonment in Taxila, Punjab, Pakistan

Taxila Cantonment ٹیکسلا کینٹ
- Neighbourhood
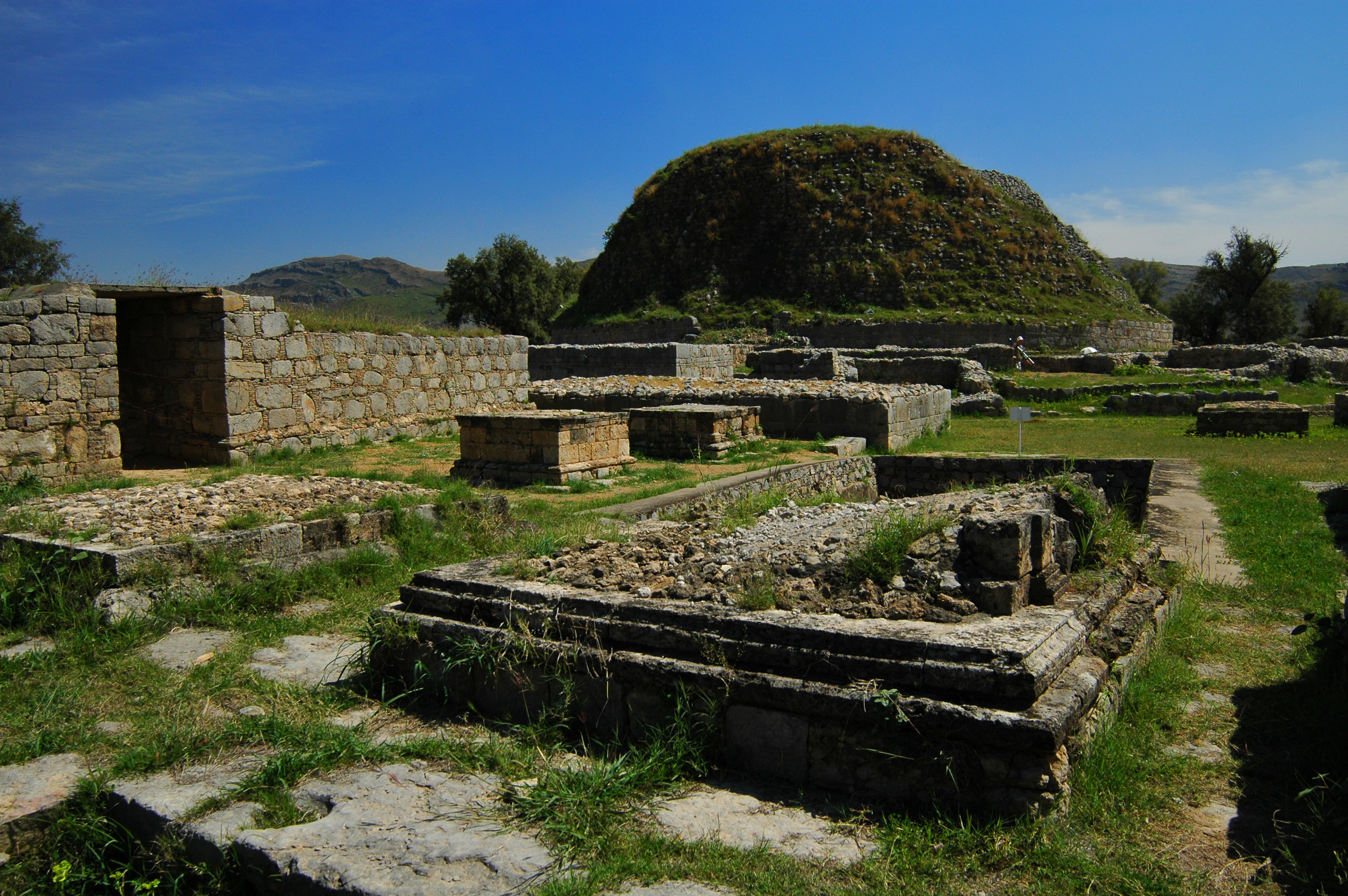
- The Dharmarajika Stupa is located near Taxila Cantonment
- Interactive map of Taxila Cantonment ٹیکسلا کینٹ
- Country: Pakistan
- Province: Punjab
- City: Taxila

Population (2017 Census of Pakistan)
  - Total: 121,952 (population of Taxila including Taxila Cantonment)
- Postal code: 47070

Taxila Cantonment (Urdu: ٹیکسلا چھاؤنی) is a cantonment adjacent to Taxila in Rawalpindi District, Punjab province, Pakistan. The city is home to Heavy Industries Taxila — a major defence, engineering conglomerate, and military corporation. Taxila Cantonment is also home to the HITEC University.Taxila cantonment is a b class cantonment having 5 elected members from each ward.

== Location ==
Taxila Cantonment is located immediately east of Taxila city, and is surrounded by the villages of Shahpur, Dhok Wajjan, and Karamwal. It is also bordered by Taxila's neighbourhoods of Muslim Colony and Hassan Colony. The cantonment is 41 kilometres away from Islamabad by road.

== Administration ==
Taxila Cantonment is managed by the Taxila Cantonment Board under the control of the Military Lands & Cantonments Department (ML&C), Ministry of Defence. Cantonments throughout Pakistan are established under and governed by the Cantonments Act 1924.

== Transportation ==
=== Rail ===
Taxila Cantonment is the location of Taxila's railway station, the Taxila Cantonment Junction railway station, also known as Taxila Junction. Taxila Junction is served by the Karachi–Peshawar Railway Line, and is the southern terminus of the Khunjerab Railway, which connects Taxila to the Havelian railway station. A planned extension of the railway will eventually connect Taxila to China's Southern Xinjiang Railway in Kashgar, as part of the China–Pakistan Economic Corridor.

=== Road ===
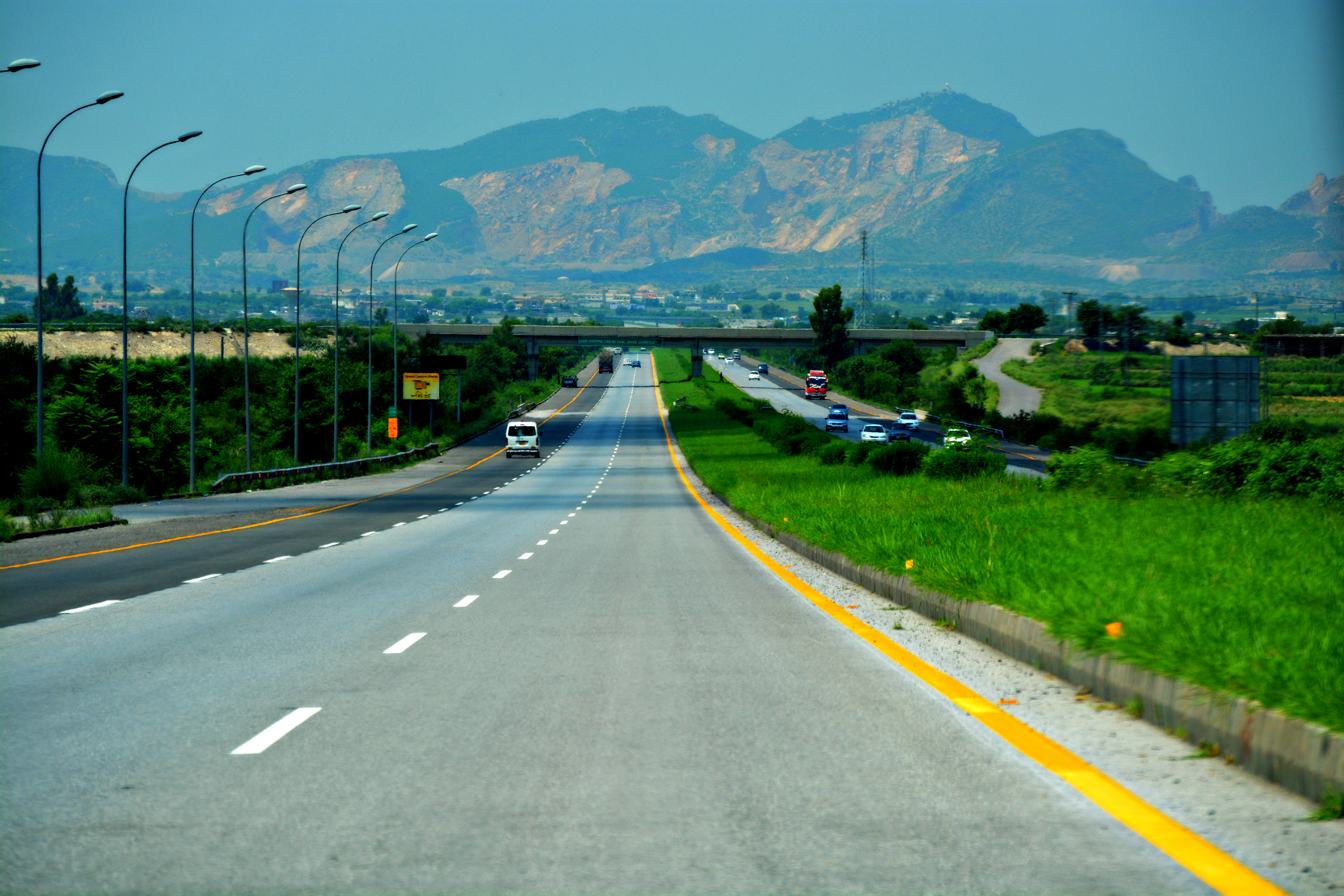
The M-1 Motorway links Taxila to Islamabad and Peshawar.

Taxila junction's road network merges into that of the Taxila city. The ancient Grand Trunk Road is designated as N-5 National Highway, and connects the city to the Afghan border, and northern Punjab. The Karakoram Highway's southern terminus is in nearby Hasan Abdal, and connects Taxila to the Chinese border near the Hunza Valley.

=== Motorways ===
The city is linked to Peshawar and Islamabad by the M-1 Motorway, which in turn offers wider motorway access to Lahore via the M-2 Motorway, and Faisalabad via the M-4 Motorway.

=== Air ===
The nearest airport to Taxila Cantonment is Islamabad International Airport, located 35 kilometres away by road. Peshawar's Bacha Khan International Airport is 155 kilometres away by road.
