= Hattar =

Hattar may refer to:

== People ==
- Nahed Hattar (1960–2016), murdered Jordanian writer and political activist
- Sakher Hattar (born 1963), Jordanian oud player
- Samer Hattar, Jordanian biologist

== Other uses ==
- Hattar, Pakistan, a subdivision of Haripur District, Khyber Pakhtunkhwa province
  - Hattar railway station

== See also ==
- Abu'l-Khattar al-Husam ibn Darar al-Kalbi, governor of Al Andalus 743–745
