= Mohra Shahwali railway station =

Railway station in Pakistan

Mohra Shahwali Station موہڑہ شاہ ولی ریلوے اسٹیشن

General information
- Owner: Ministry of Railways
- Line: Taxila-Khunjerab Railway Line

Other information
- Station code: MSWI

Services
Preceding station	Pakistan Railways	Following station
Usman Khattar towards Taxila Cantonment Junction	Taxila–Khunjerab Line	Hattar towards Khunjerab Junction
Location

Mohra Shahwali Railway Station (Urdu: موہڑہ شاہ ولی ریلوے اسٹیشن) is located in Pakistan.

== See also ==
- List of railway stations in Pakistan
- Pakistan Railways
