= KCW =

KCW or kcw may refer to:

- Kentucky College for Women, a now-defunct college formerly located in Danville, Kentucky, United States
- Kinnaird College for Women, a university in Lahore, Pakistan
- KCW, the station code for Kalanchwala railway station, Punjab, Pakistan
- kcw, the ISO 639-3 code for Kabwari language, Democratic Republic of the Congo
