= Hatter (disambiguation) =

A hatter is a person engaged in hatmaking.

Hatter(s) may also refer to:

== People ==
- Clyde Hatter (1908–1937), American baseball player
- Hamilton Hatter (1856–1942), African American professor
- Maddelynn Hatter, American drag queen
- Steve Hatter (born 1958), English footballer
- Terry J. Hatter Jr. (born 1933), American judge
- Tony Hatter, British automobile designer
- Hatter, a demonym of residents of Medicine Hat, Canada

== Sports ==
- Danbury Hatters, an American baseball team (1887–1914)
- Madison Hatters, an American baseball team
- Stetson Hatters, Stetson University's athletics teams
- Luton Town F.C. or the Hatters, an English football team
- Stockport County F.C. or the Hatters, an English football team

== Other uses ==
- Hatter (Alice's Adventures in Wonderland), a character in Lewis Carroll's stories
- Hatter Fox, a character in Marilyn Harris's stories
- Háttér Society, an LGBTQI NGO in Hungary

== See also ==
- Hattar (disambiguation)
- Mad as a hatter (disambiguation)
- Mad Hatter (disambiguation)
