= LQP =

LQP may refer to:

- Lac qui Parle County, Minnesota, United States
- Letter-quality printer, a form of computer impact printer
- LQP, the station code for Liaquat Pur railway station, Rahim Yar Khan, Pakistan
