= Serai Saleh Halt railway station =

Railway station in Pakistan

Serai Saleh Railway Station سرائے صالح ریلوے اسٹیشن
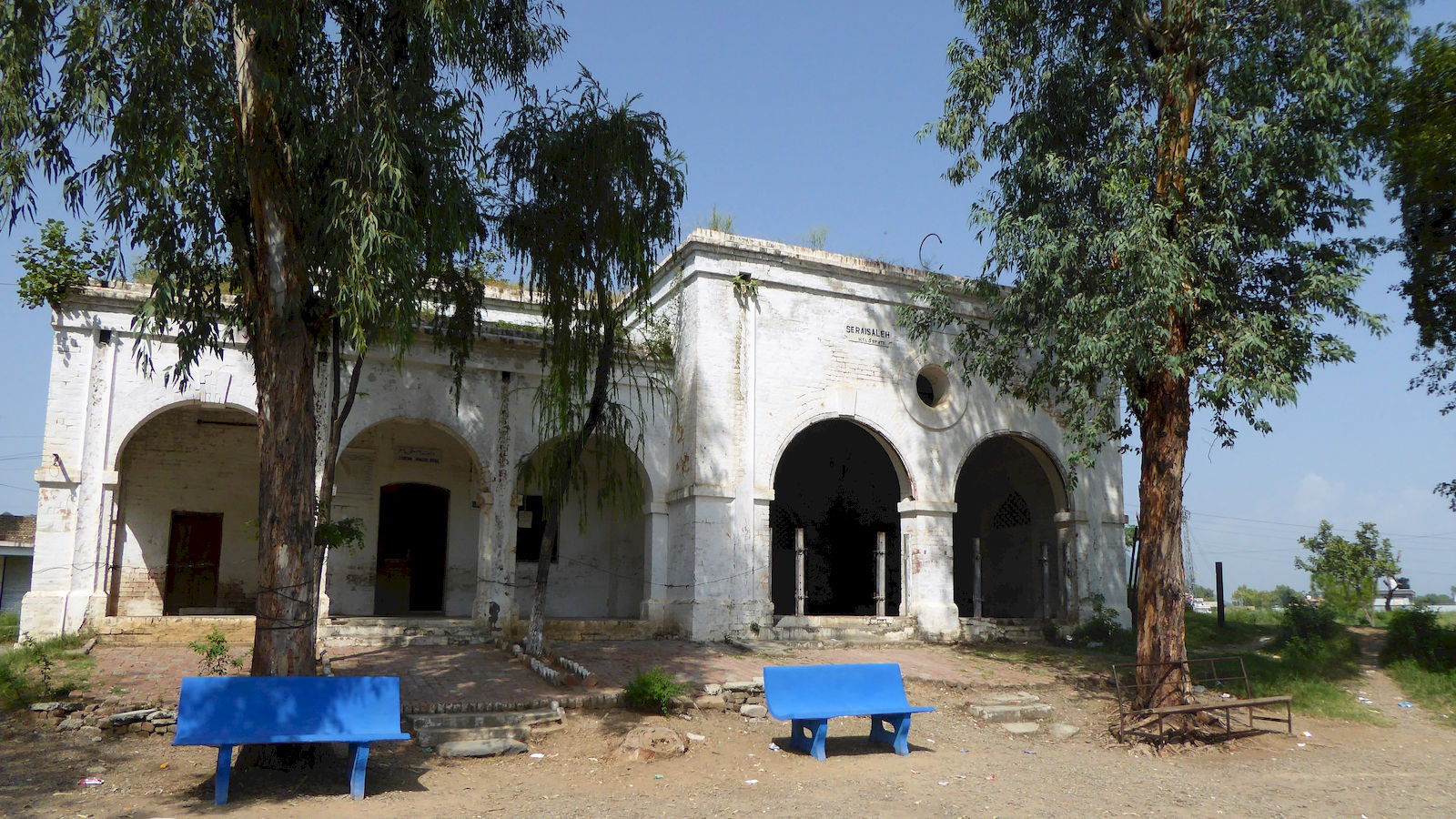

General information
- Coordinates: 33.9837°N 72.9869°E
- Owner: Ministry of Railways
- Line: Taxila–Khunjerab Railway Line

Other information
- Station code: SSQ

Services
Preceding station	Pakistan Railways	Following station
Haripur Hazara towards Taxila Cantonment Junction	Taxila–Khunjerab Line	Baldher towards Khunjerab Junction
Location

Serai Saleh Railway Station (Urdu: سرائے صالح ریلوے اسٹیشن) is located in Pakistan.

== See also ==
- List of railway stations in Pakistan
- Pakistan Railways
