= FRQ =

FRQ may refer to:

- Farooqia railway station, in Pakistan
- Feature request
- Forak language
- Frequency
- Frequency (gene)
- Rugby Quebec (French: Fédération de Rugby du Québec)
- Free response question, a type of open-ended question
