= Madhatter =

- Madhatter, slang name for Java Desktop System
- 6735 Madhatter, a minor planet

== See also ==
- Mad Hatter (disambiguation)
