= Kholian Bala =

Coordinates: 34°01′N 73°06′E

Kholian Bala کھولیاں بالا
- Union council
- Postal Code : 22585
- Interactive map of Kholian Bala کھولیاں بالا
- Country: Pakistan
- Province: KPK
- District: Haripur
- Tehsil: Haripur

Population
  - Total: 25,000

Kholian Bala is a village located in the Haripur District of Khyber Pakhtunkhwa, Pakistan. Situated amidst stunning natural surroundings, the village boasts the scenic Dor River flowing through its vicinity, offering both beauty and utility to its residents. Surrounded by majestic mountains, Kholian Bala is known for its picturesque landscapes and abundant natural water resources, contributing to its charm and vitality. The village is home to a medical dispensary inaugurated by former Prime Minister Nawaz Sharif, serving the healthcare needs of the local community.

This village would be a medium for Railways Network of the China Pakistan Economic Corridor along with expected (Havelian DryPort Project) being built in the vicinity of Baldher railway station about five kilometres from Haripur and is designed to meet the demand of the containerized future freight traffic between China and Pakistan under the China-Pakistan Economic Corridor.
