= Jhetha Bhutta railway station =

Railway station in Punjab, Pakistan

Jhetha Bhutta Railway Station جھتھا بھٹہ ریلوے اسٹیشن

General information
- Coordinates: 28.6816°N 70.7418°E
- Owner: Ministry of Railways
- Line: Karachi–Peshawar Railway Line

Other information
- Station code: JTA

Services
Preceding station	Pakistan Railways	Following station
Khanpur towards Kiamari	Karachi–Peshawar Line	Firoza towards Peshawar Cantonment
Location

Jhetha Bhutta Railway Station (Urdu and Punjabi: جھتھا بھٹہ ریلوے اسٹیشن) is located in Jhetha Bhutta village, Rahim Yar Khan district of Punjab province, Pakistan.

== See also ==
- List of railway stations in Pakistan
- Pakistan Railways
