= Feroza railway station =

Railway station in Punjab, Pakistan

Firoza Railway Station فیروزہ ریلوے اسٹیشن

General information
- Coordinates: 28.7640°N 70.8187°E
- Owner: Ministry of Railways
- Line: Karachi–Peshawar Railway Line

Other information
- Station code: FRA

Services
Preceding station	Pakistan Railways	Following station
Jhetha Bhutta towards Kiamari	Karachi–Peshawar Line	Liaquatpur towards Peshawar Cantonment
Location

Feroza Railway Station (Urdu and Punjabi: فیروزہ ریلوے اسٹیشن) is located in Firoza village, Rahim Yar Khan district of Punjab province, Pakistan.

== See also ==
- List of railway stations in Pakistan
- Pakistan Railways
