= HITEC University =

Private university in Punjab, Pakistan

- ہای ٹیک یونیورسٹی
- Motto: In Truth I Triumph
- Established: 2007
- Affiliations: Higher Education Commission of Pakistan; Pakistan Engineering Council; Washington Accord; University of Strathclyde; Istanbul Technical University
- Vice-Chancellor: Prof. Dr. Sohail Asghar
- Dean: Prof. Dr. S. Kamran Afaq, Prof. Dr. Tahir Nadeem Malik
- Location: Taxila Cantonment, Punjab, Pakistan
- Campus: Urban, 20 Acres
- Website: http://www.hitecuni.edu.pk

HITEC University is a private university located in Taxila Cantonment, Punjab, Pakistan.

Taxila, a historic seat of learning and an important archaeological site, is about 120 km north-west of Islamabad and Rawalpindi. HITEC University commenced classes in November 2007 with an intake of 250 students, in affiliation with the University of Engineering and Technology, Taxila. The university was granted its own charter in November 2009 by the government of Punjab. The university is sponsored by the Heavy Industries Taxila Education Welfare Trust.

== History ==
HITEC University was conceived as a part of Heavy Industries Taxila Education City (HITEC). The premises were already hosting educational institutes of nursery, school, and college level. In 2007, in affiliation with UET Taxila, BS in Mechanical and Electrical Engineering, BBA and BS Islamic Studies were launched. HITEC university was granted its own Charter by the Government of the Punjab on 17 November 2009 and all students were transferred to HITEC University. HITEC University offers undergraduate, postgraduate and doctorate programs in engineering, Computer Science, Software Engineering, Computer Engineering, Civil Engineering Mathematics, Islamic Studies, and Business Administration. The inauguration was presided by then president General Pervez Musharraf. Five years later, the university opened a new department for Computer Science and in 2019 it launched the Department of Civil Engineering.

== Location ==
Taxila is an ancient city, about 30 km west of the Islamabad Capital Territory and Rawalpindi. It is a tehsil of District Rawalpindi. It is on the border of the Punjab and Khyber Pakhtunkhwa, just off the Grand Trunk Road. Spread over an area of more than 20 acres, the campus is located at the foot of Margella Hills only 2 km from Taxila City. Apart from Taxila Museum, a number of important industries including Heavy Industries Taxila (HIT), Heavy Mechanical Complex (HMC), Pakistan Ordnance Factories (POFs), Pakistan Aeronautical Complex (PAC), Telephone Industry Pakistan (TIP), and FECTO Cement are near the university.

== Admissions ==
The admissions are strictly based on merit. The university is open to all persons without prejudice to gender, religion, race, creed, color, or domicile.

Admission is granted on the basis of eligibility criteria. Applicants, who have appeared in a prerequisite examination prescribed for admission in a program and are awaiting results, will be provisionally admitted against an undertaking that they will pass their examination as per admission criteria. Students awaiting results are required to submit attested copies of their certificates/degrees within two weeks after the declaration of results, failing which the university will cancel their admissions. Only those students will be registered who would complete all admission formalities including the deposit of their fees and other dues on the prescribed date.

Every undergraduate student shall be expected to take the full load of the courses prescribed for the semester. A master level student, however, will have the option to enroll for fewer courses. Students applying for graduate programs are required to be qualified as per criteria laid down by HEC.

=== Degree programs ===
The disciplines and the degree programs offered by HITEC have been tabulated below. The minimum duration of BS and MS / M Phil degree programs is 4 and 1.5 years, respectively.

Discipline	Degree Program		
Discipline	BS	MS / M Phil	PhD
Electrical Engineering	✓	✓	✓
Mechanical Engineering	✓	✓	✓
Design & Manufacturing Engineering		✓	✓
Computer Sciences	✓	✓	✓
Computer Engineering	✓	✓	
Software Engineering	✓		
Civil Engineering	✓		
Mathematics	✓	✓	✓
Islamic Studies	✓	✓	✓
Bachelor of Business Administration	✓		

== MOU with foreign universities ==
HITEC University has a memorandum of understanding with some universities and institutions worldwide. The list is as follows:

- University of Strathclyde.
- İstanbul Technical University.
- Universiti Teknologi Malaysia.

== Transport ==
A transport facility of buses is provided to students from Rawalpindi and Islamabad.

== Hostel ==
The university administration took a step to meet the needs of students by building a new hostel (Jinnah Hostel) with all facilities which has become a success. Now, the university has two internal hostel buildings for boys.

== Mosque and Religious Education Complex ==
There is a mosque on HITEC University premises free for use by students. It has a capacity of 700.

There is one Religious Education Complex under the mosque where Hifz and Nazira Quran classes are conducted.

== Library ==
=== General collection ===
The general collection is organized according to Dewey Decimal Classification and shelved subject-wise according to call numbers (100–999) pasted on the spine of each item.

=== Reference collection ===
A significant number of current reference sources are available on reference shelves. Electronic databases including, dictionaries, encyclopedias, handbooks, directories, yearbooks, atlases, and bibliographies are distinct features of this collection. The reference books can only be consulted within the library.

=== Journals and magazines ===
The library has a good collection of periodicals, and leading newspapers: seven daily national newspapers (three Urdu and four English) including Dawn Business Recorder, etc. The library also has national magazines on computers, general and current affairs.

=== Digital Library ===
To meet the information requirements of students and researchers with the provision of quality scholarly materials, there is an information-based electronic Digital Library. Access to all these resources is free from within the HITEC University Digital Library.

=== Islamic Library ===
Adjacent to the university mosque, a separate library for Islamic and religious books is situated.

== Online Readiness ==
HITEC University was assessed 100% ready for online preparedness by Higher Education Commission of Pakistan to conduct classes during the lock down period. Assessment was carried out by a third party engaged by the Higher Education Commission of Pakistan.
