= Usman Khattar railway station =

Railway station in Pakistan

Usman Khattar Railway Station عثمان کھٹر ریلوے اسٹیشن

General information
- Owner: Ministry of Railways
- Line: Taxila-Khunjerab Railway Line

Other information
- Station code: UKT

Services
Preceding station	Pakistan Railways	Following station
Taxila Cantonment Junction Terminus	Taxila–Khunjerab Line	Mohra Shahwali towards Khunjerab Junction
Location

Usman Khattar Railway Station (Urdu: عثمان کھٹر ریلوے اسٹیشن) is located in Tehsil Taxila of District Rawalpindi Pakistan. Usman Khattar (Taxila) is surrounded by Wah Cantt on one side and Hassan Abdal on the other side.

== See also ==
- List of railway stations in Pakistan
- Pakistan Railways
