= Mad as a hatter (disambiguation) =

Mad as a hatter is a colloquial English phrase suggesting insanity.

Mad as a hatter may also refer to:

- "Mad as a Hatter", an episode of Batman: The Animated Series
- "Mad as a Hatter", an episode of The Real Housewives of Dallas (season 1)
- "Mad as a Hatter", an episode of Ladies of London
- Mad As A Hatter (EP), by Def Wish Cast, 1993, and a track on the EP
- Mad as a Hatter, an album by Shadowland, 1996
- "Mad as a hatter", part of mnemonic for features of anticholinergic syndrome

== See also ==
- Mad Hatter (disambiguation)
- Hatter (disambiguation)
- Erethism, or mad hatter disease
- Mad as a March hare
