= Haripur Hazara railway station =

Railway station in Pakistan

Haripur Hazara Railway Station ہری پور ہزارہ ریلوے اسٹیشن
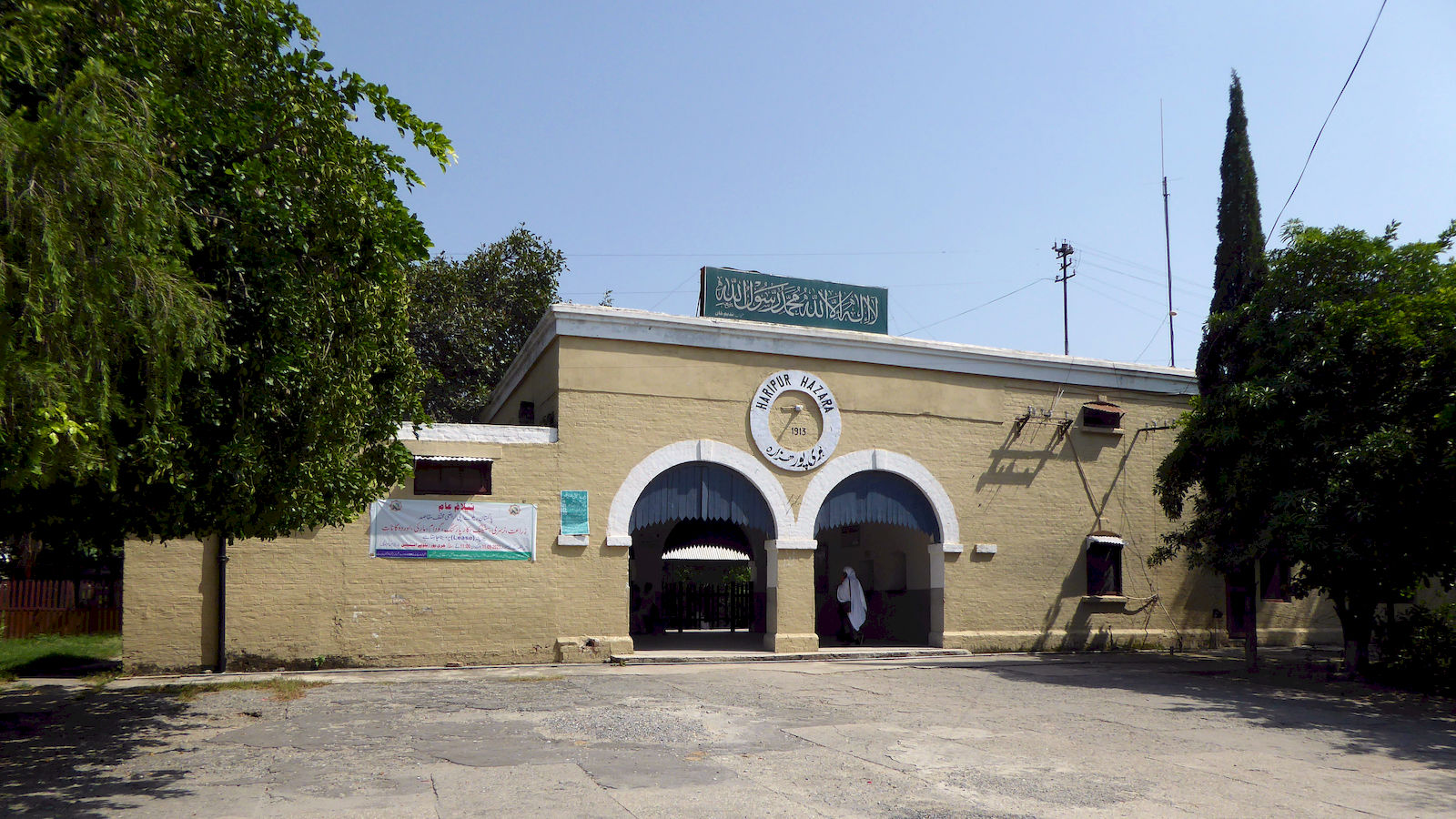

General information
- Coordinates: 33.984651°N 72.928567°E
- Owner: Ministry of Railways
- Line: Taxila–Khunjerab Railway Line

Other information
- Station code: HRU

History
- Opened: 1913

Services
Preceding station	Pakistan Railways	Following station
Kot Najib Ullah towards Taxila Cantonment Junction	Taxila–Khunjerab Line	Serai Saleh towards Khunjerab Junction
Location

Haripur Hazara Railway Station (Urdu: ہری پور ہزارہ ریلوے اسٹیشن) is located in Haripur, Pakistan.

== See also ==
- List of railway stations in Pakistan
- Pakistan Railways

== Gallery ==
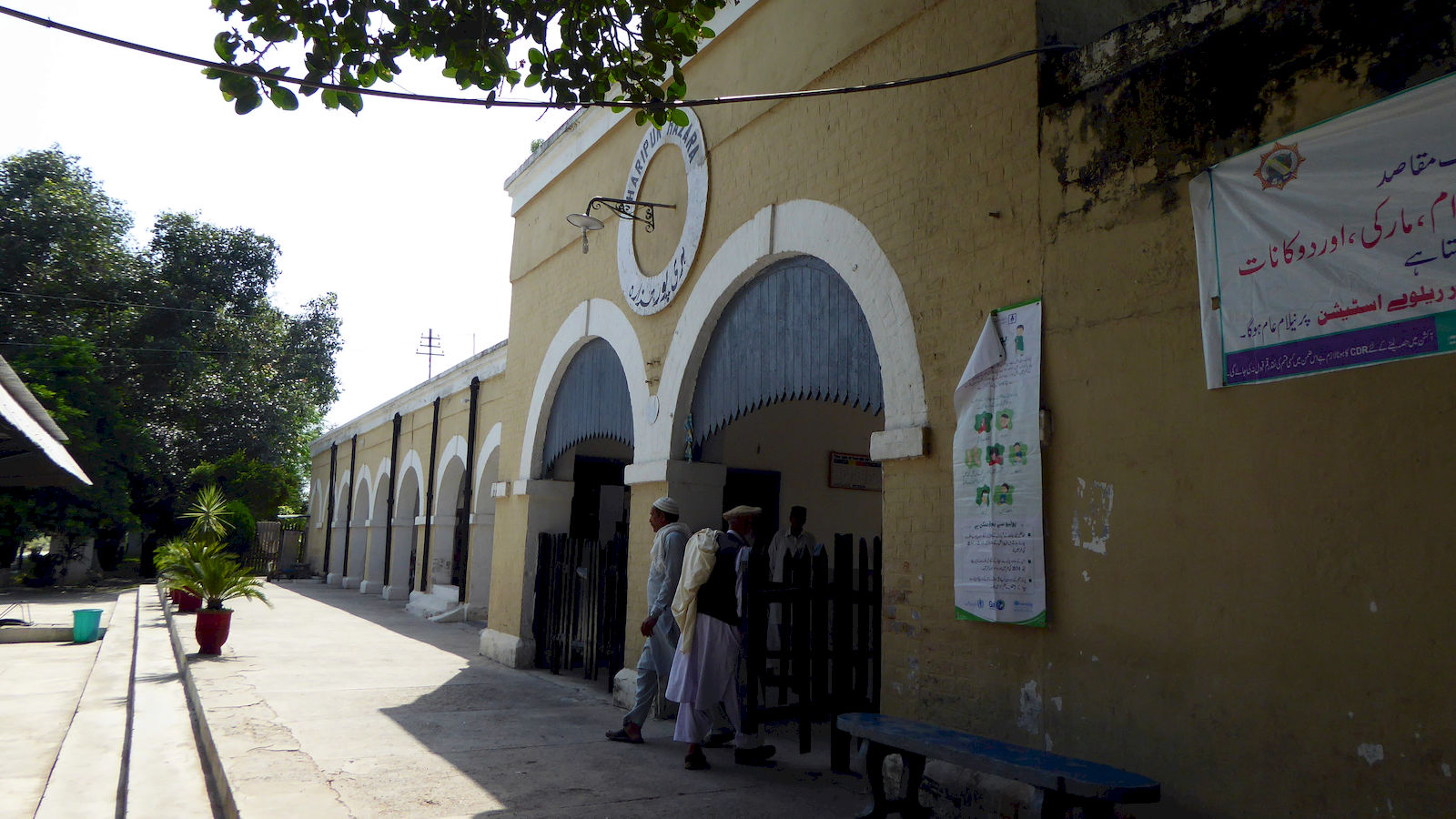

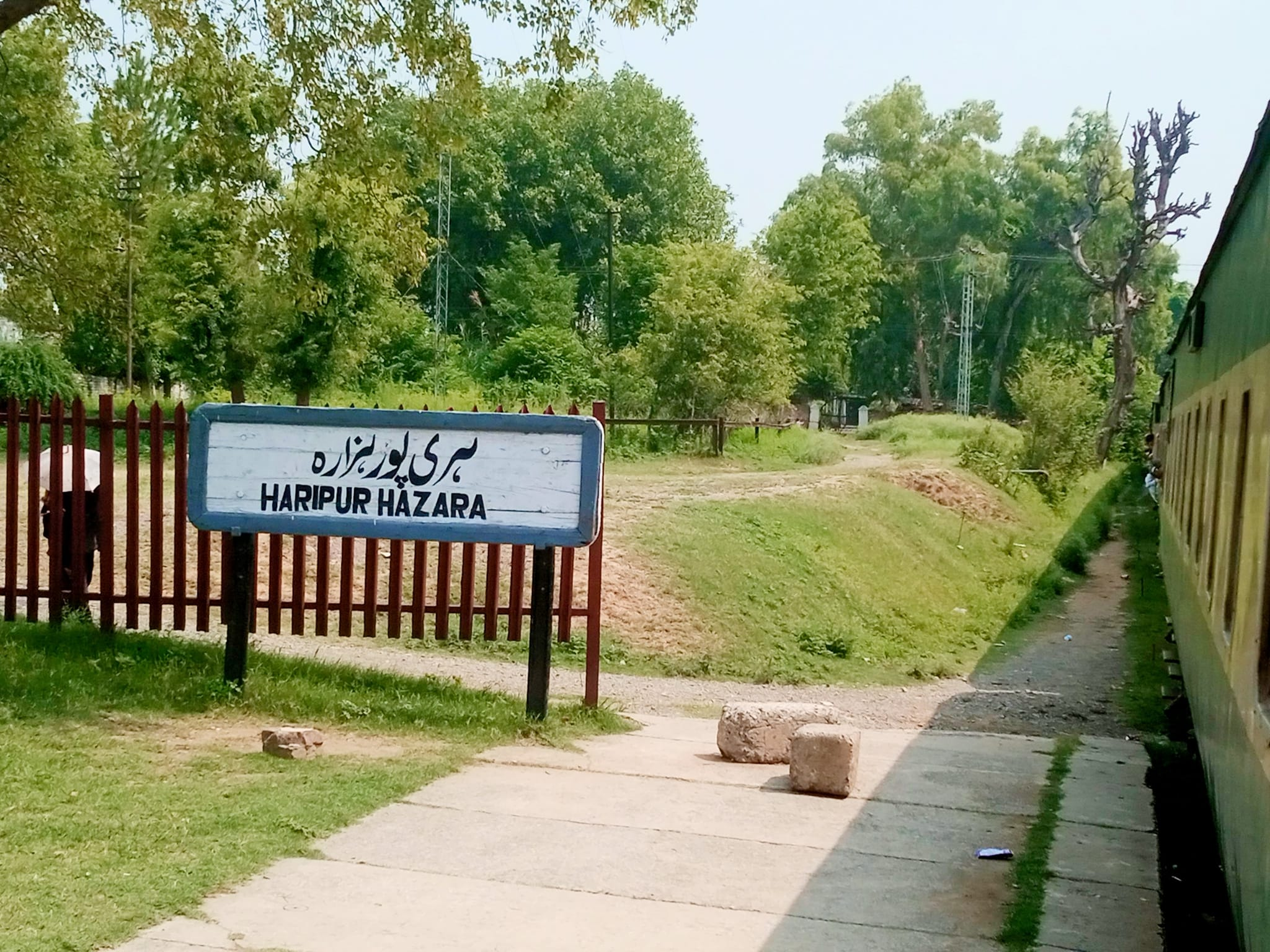
