= Kot Najibullah railway station =

Railway station in Kot Najeebullah, Pakistan

Kot Najib Ullah Station کوٹ نجیب اللہ ریلوے اسٹیشن
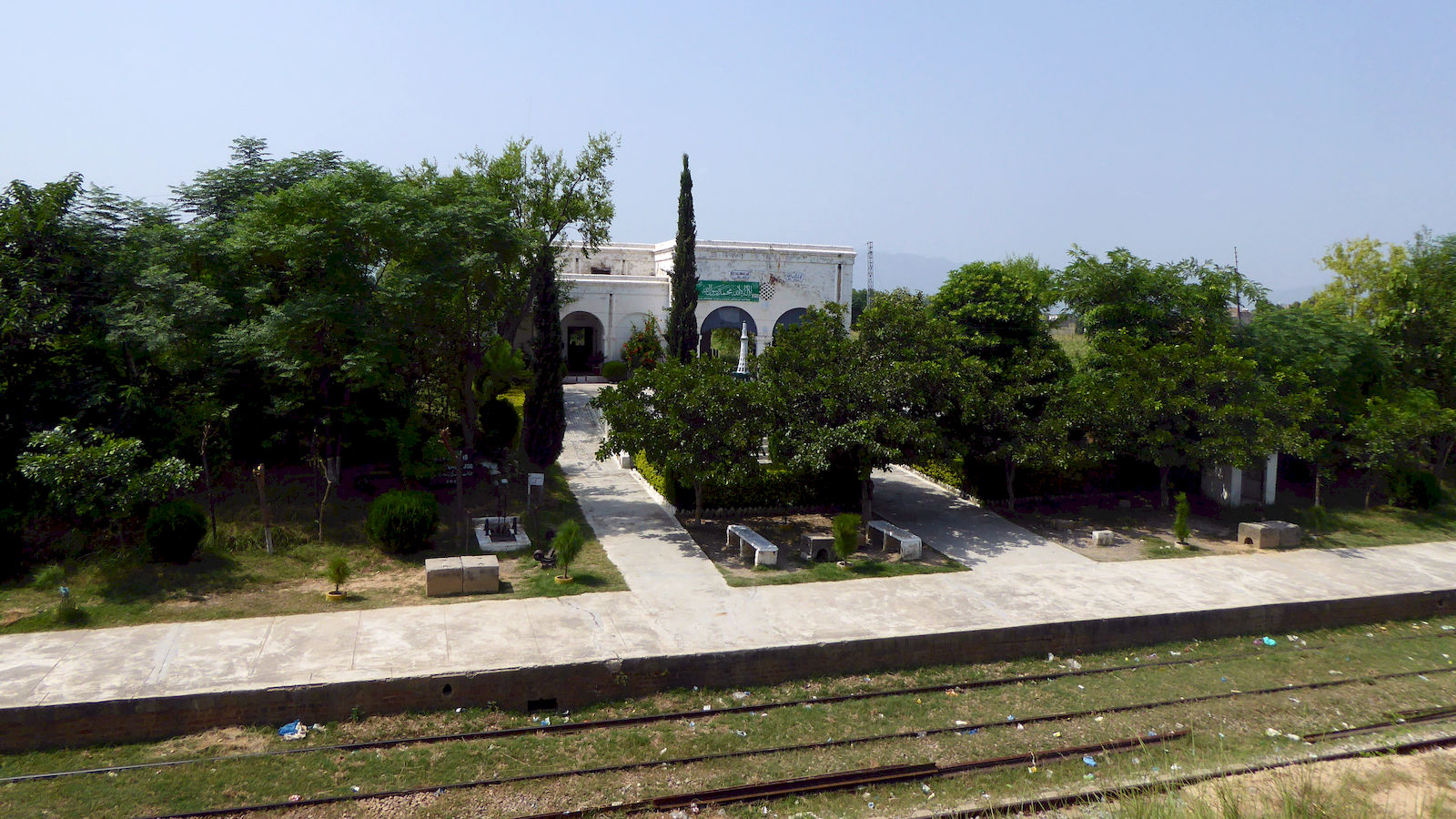

General information
- Coordinates: 33.9280°N 72.8622°E
- Owner: Ministry of Railways
- Line: Taxila-Khunjerab Railway Line

Other information
- Station code: KJQ

History
- Opened: 1913

Services
| Preceding station | Pakistan Railways | Following station |
|---|---|---|
| Hattar towards Taxila Cantonment Junction | Taxila–Khunjerab Line | Haripur Hazara towards Khunjerab Junction |
Location

Kot Najibullah Railway Station (Urdu, Hindko: کوٹ نجیب اللہ ریلوے اسٹیشن) is located in Haripur district, Khyber Pakhtunkhwa, Pakistan.

== See also ==
- List of railway stations in Pakistan
- Pakistan Railways

== Gallery ==
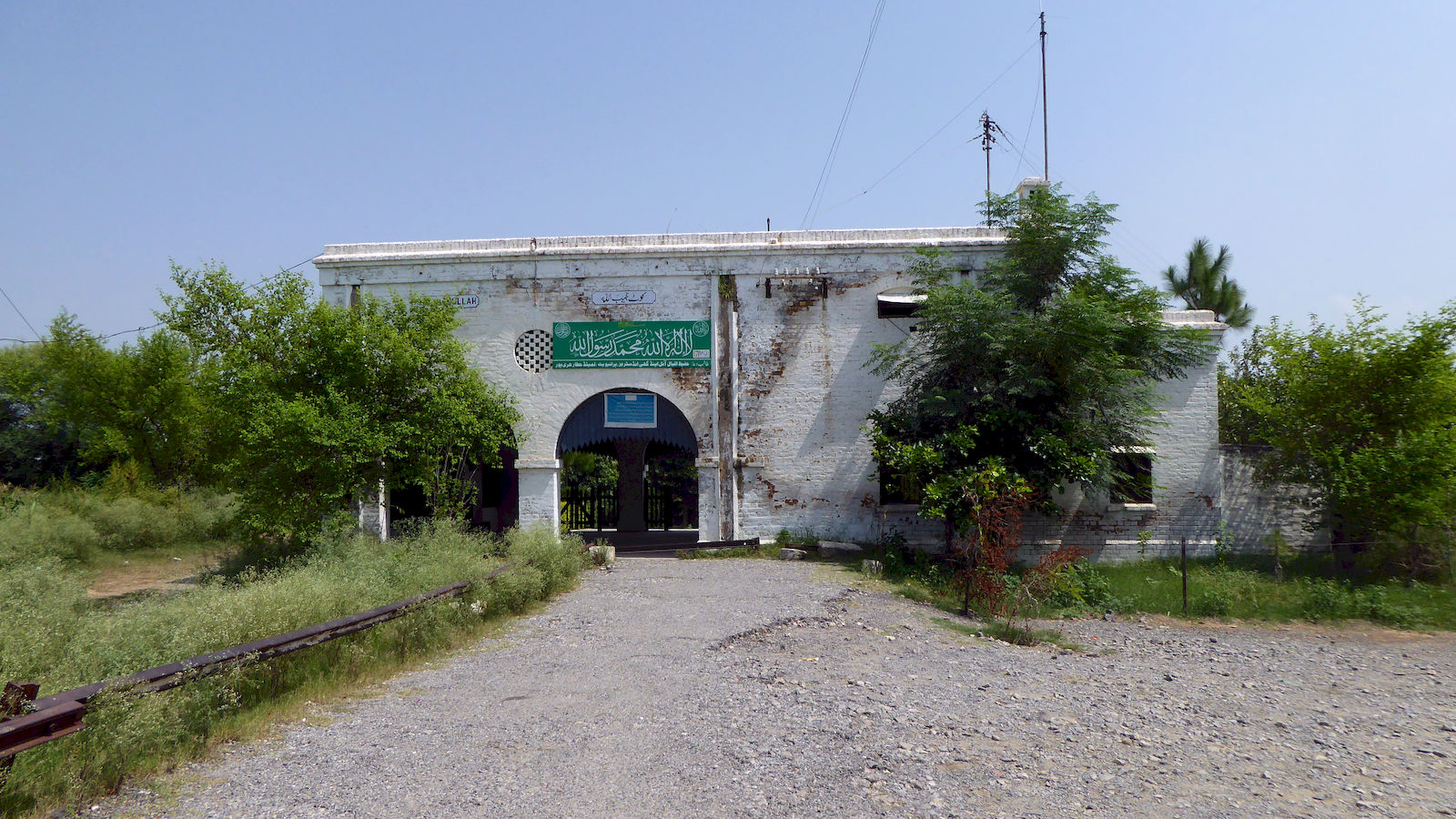

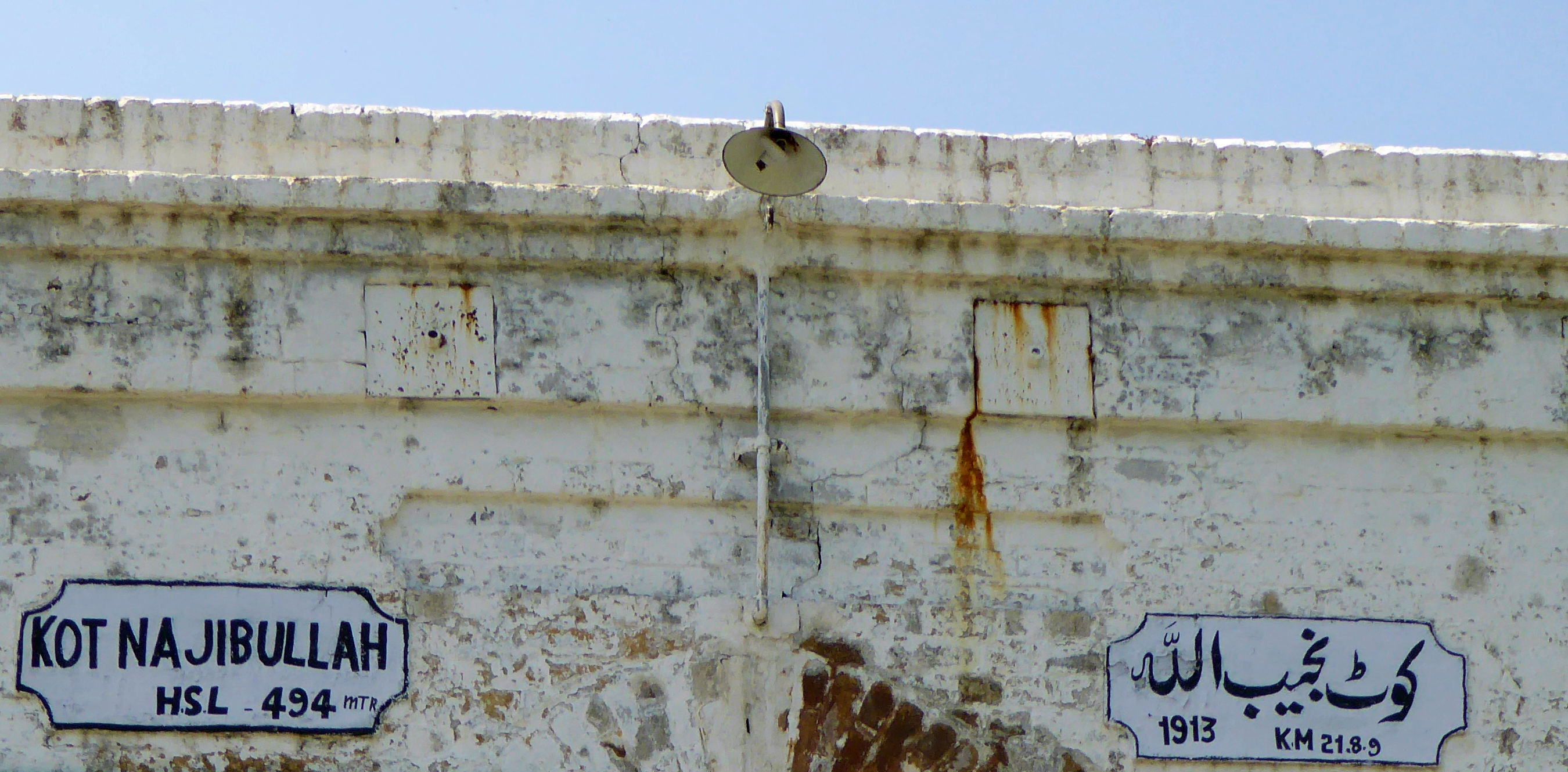
