= Hattar railway station =

Railway station in Pakistan

Coordinates: 33°51′N 72°50′E

Hattar Railway Station حطار ریلوے اسٹیشن
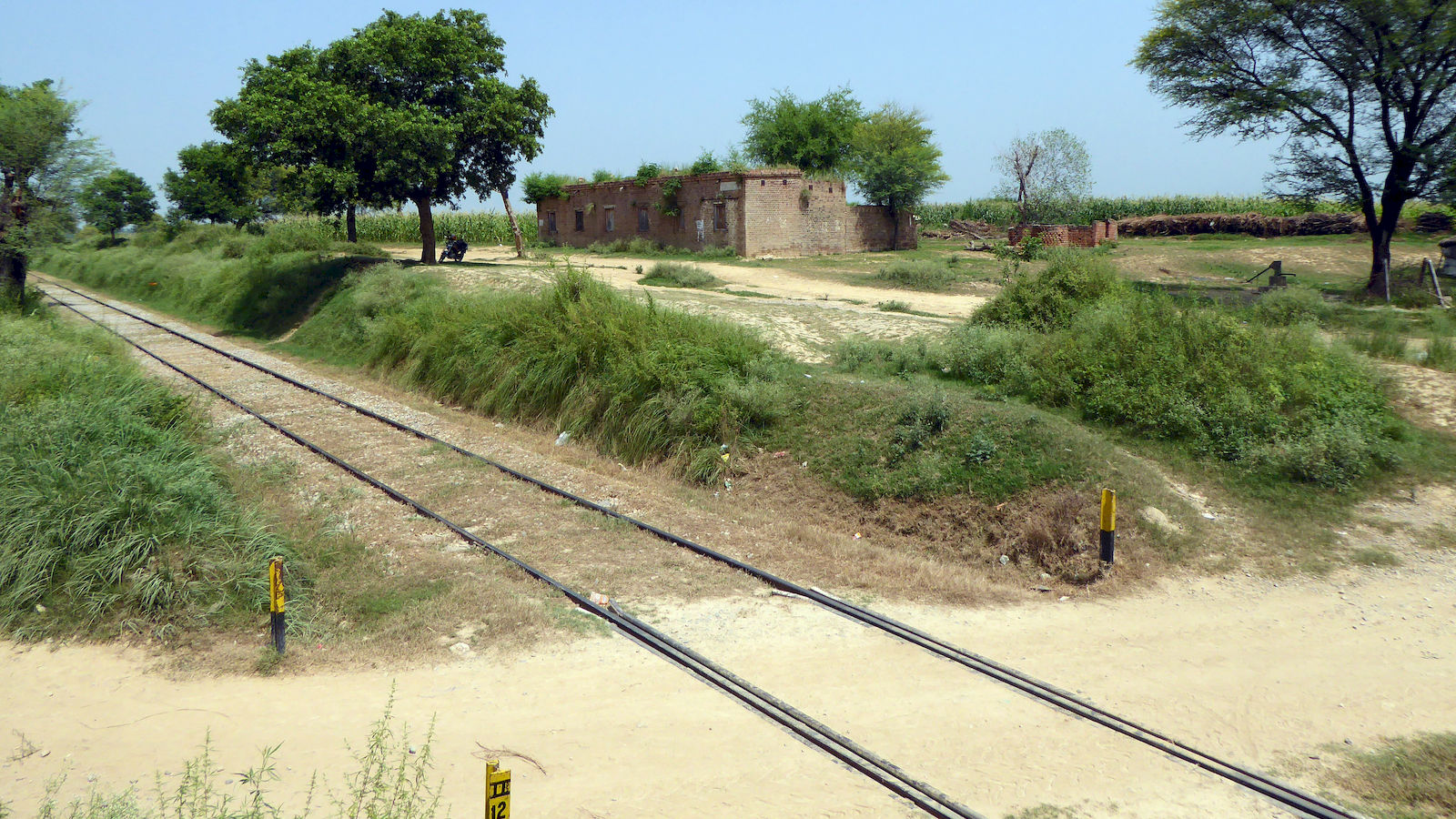

General information
- Owner: Ministry of Railways
- Line: Taxila-Khunjerab Railway Line

Other information
- Station code: HTTR

Services
Preceding station	Pakistan Railways	Following station
Mohra Shahwali towards Taxila Cantonment Junction	Taxila–Khunjerab Line	Kot Najib Ullah towards Khunjerab Junction
Location

Hattar Railway Station (Urdu: حطار ریلوے اسٹیشن) is located in Hattar, Khyber Pakhtunkhwa, Pakistan.

== See also ==
- List of railway stations in Pakistan
- Pakistan Railways
