= Chani Goth railway station =

Railway station in Pakistan

Chani Goth Railway Station چنی گوٹھ ریلوے اسٹیشن

General information
- Coordinates: 29.0865°N 71.0310°E
- Owner: Ministry of Railways
- Line: Karachi–Peshawar Railway Line
- Platforms: 3
- Tracks: [UP Main Line, Down Main Line, Up Relief Siding, Down Relief Siding]

Other information
- Station code: CNG

Services
Preceding station	Pakistan Railways	Following station
Liaquatpur towards Kiamari	Karachi–Peshawar Line	Kulab towards Peshawar Cantonment
Location

Chani Goth Railway Station (Urdu and Punjabi: چنی گوٹھ ریلوے اسٹیشن) is located in Pakistan.

== See also ==
- List of railway stations in Pakistan
- Pakistan Railways
