= Kulab railway station =

Railway station in Punjab, Pakistan

Kulab Railway Station کولاب ریلوے اسٹیشن

General information
- Coordinates: 29.1176°N 71.1375°E
- Owner: Ministry of Railways
- Line: Karachi–Peshawar Railway Line

Other information
- Station code: KBB

Services
Preceding station	Pakistan Railways	Following station
Chanigot towards Kiamari	Karachi–Peshawar Line	Dera Nawab Sahib towards Peshawar Cantonment
Location

Kulab Railway Station (Urdu and Punjabi: کولاب ریلوے اسٹیشن) is located in Kulab village, Bahawalpur district of Punjab province of the Pakistan.

== See also ==
- List of railway stations in Pakistan
- Pakistan Railways
