= Baldher railway station =

Railway station in Pakistan

Baldher Railway Station بالڈھیر ریلوے اسٹیشن
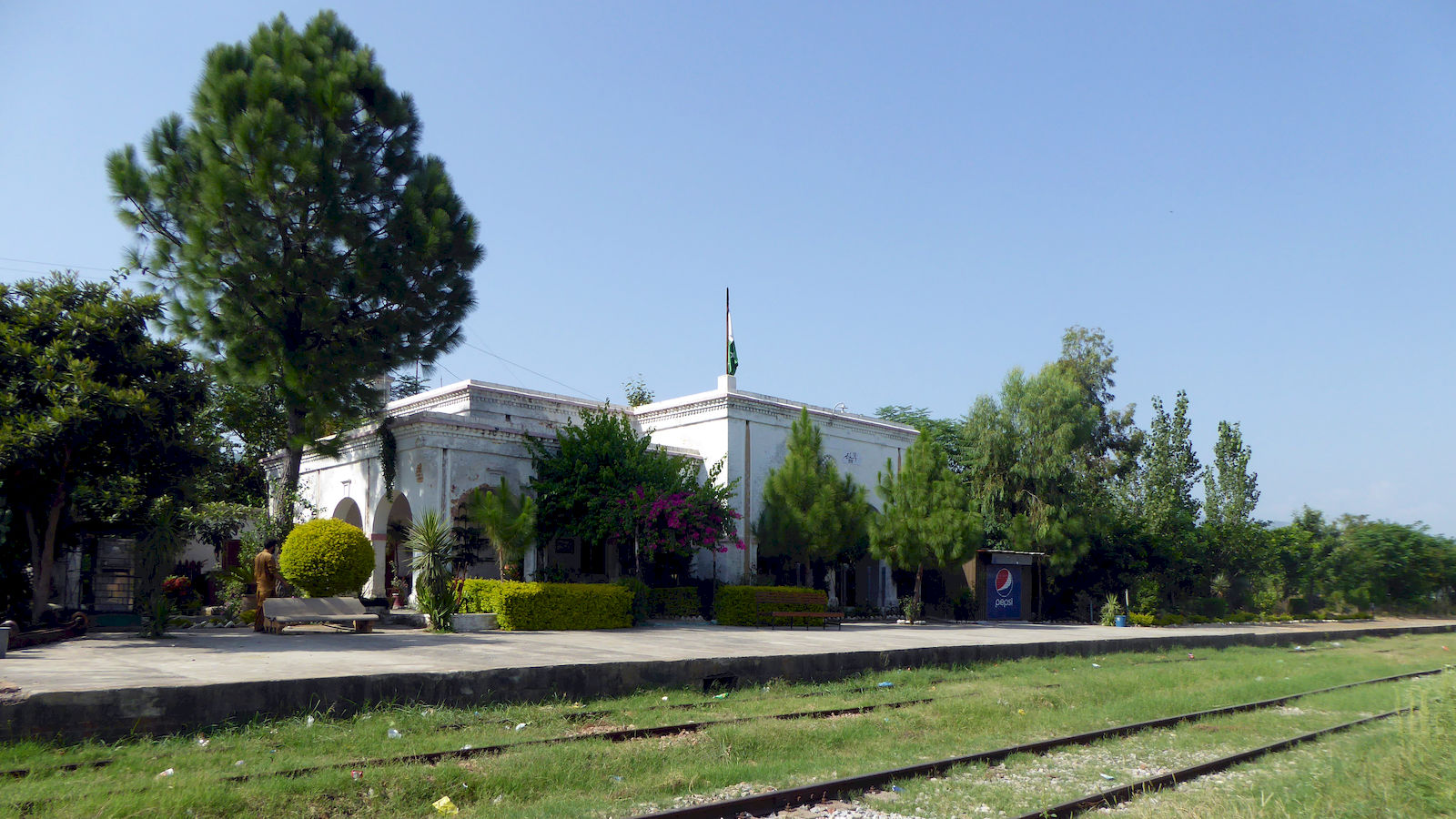

General information
- Coordinates: 34.008187°N 73.089317°E
- Owner: Ministry of Railways
- Line: Taxila–Khunjerab Railway Line

Other information
- Station code: BZD

History
- Opened: 1913

Services
| Preceding station | Pakistan Railways | Following station |
|---|---|---|
| Serai Saleh towards Taxila Cantonment Junction | Taxila–Khunjerab Line | Havelian towards Khunjerab Junction |
Location

Baldher Railway Station (Urdu: بالڈھیر ریلوے اسٹیشن) is located in the village of Baldher, Khyber Pakhtunkhwa Province, Haripur District, Pakistan.

== See also ==
- List of railway stations in Pakistan
- Pakistan Railways

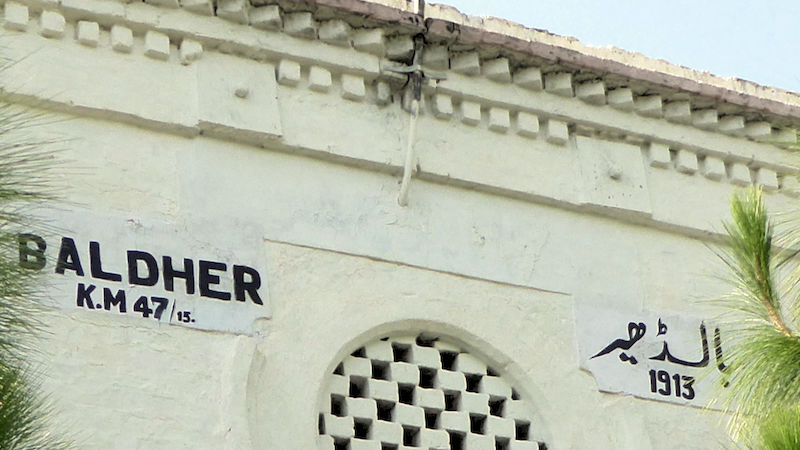
Baldher railway station tag
