= Dera Nawab Sahib railway station =

Railway station in Punjab, Pakistan

Dera Nawab Sahib Station ڈیرہ نواب صاحب اسٹیشن
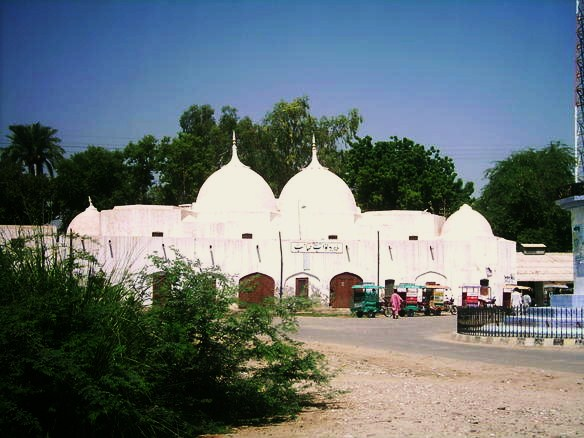

General information
- Coordinates: 29.1524°N 71.2555°E
- Owner: Ministry of Railways
- Line: Karachi–Peshawar Railway Line

Other information
- Station code: DWBS

Services
| Preceding station | Pakistan Railways | Following station |
|---|---|---|
| Kulab towards Kiamari | Karachi–Peshawar Line | Mubarakpur towards Peshawar Cantonment |
Location

Dera Nawab Sahib Railway Station (Urdu and Punjabi: ڈیرہ نواب صاحب ریلوے اسٹیشن) is located in Ahmadpur East Tehsil, Bahawalpur district of Punjab, Pakistan. It is one of the first railway station in the subcontinent, built by the order of the Nawab of Bahawalpur in 1856.

== See also ==
- List of railway stations in Pakistan
- Pakistan Railways
