= Sakher Hattar =

Jordanian oud player (born 1963)

- Born: 1963 (age 62–63)
- Origin: Amman, Jordan
- Genres: Jordanian, Arabic Music
- Occupation: Oud player
- Website: http://www.sakherhattar.com

Sakher Hattar (Arabic: صخر حتر) is a Jordanian oud player. Oud is a stringed musical instrument similar to the Lute. He was born in Amman in 1963, and has studied and played the oud for over 25 years. Hattar has been called one of the finest oud players in the region, and one of the most significant Arab musicians of his generation, and throughout his experienced musical career, he has taken part in many events and won many awards for his talent, including first place at the International Competition for Oud in Cairo, 1993.

Hattar performs solo, and with Al Nagham Al Arabi music ensemble (takht). He also takes part in performances with different orchestras, including the Orchestra of the National Music Conservatory (NMC). In addition to performing, Sakher is a researcher, lecturer and instructor of oud. He has produced CDs of his compositions, improvisations, and covers of traditional and classic Arabic music and songs.

Hattar is also involved with various musical institutions in Jordan. He is chairman of the Arab Music Section and Oud Instructor at the Jordan NMC / Noor Al Hussein Foundation in Amman. He is also a member of the NMC team, which is entrusted with writing music textbooks for the Ministry of Education. Furthermore, Hattar is founder, director and trainer of the Al Fuhais Troupe for the Revival of Heritage, which received the State Encouragement Award in 1992 for its contribution to the revival of Jordanian cultural heritage.
