= Kalanchwala railway station =

Railway station in Punjab, Pakistan

Kalanchwala Railway Station کلانچ والا ریلوے اسٹیشن

General information
- Coordinates: 29.2944°N 71.4446°E
- Owner: Ministry of Railways
- Line: Karachi–Peshawar Railway Line

Other information
- Station code: KCW

Services
Preceding station	Pakistan Railways	Following station
Mubarakpur towards Kiamari	Karachi–Peshawar Line	Samasata Junction towards Peshawar Cantonment
Location

Kalanchwala Railway Station (Urdu and Punjabi: کلانچ والا ریلوے اسٹیشن) is located in Kalanchwala village, Bahawalpur district of Punjab province, Pakistan.

== See also ==
- List of railway stations in Pakistan
- Pakistan Railways
