= Mad Hatter (disambiguation) =

The Mad Hatter is a character in Lewis Carroll's stories.

Mad Hatter may refer to:

== Arts and entertainment ==
=== Fictional characters ===
- Mad Hatter (DC Comics), DC Comics character
- Mad Hatter, a Marvel Comics character associated with villain White Rabbit
- Mad Hatter, a character in Once Upon a Time

=== Film ===
- The Mad Hatter (1948 film), a 1948 Woody Woodpecker animated cartoon
- The Mad Hatters, a 1935 British comedy film
- Breakfast in Hollywood, also known as The Mad Hatter, a 1946 American comedy film

=== Music ===
- Mad Hatter (album), by Bonham, 1992, and the album's title track
- The Mad Hatter (album), by Chick Corea, 1978
- "Mad Hatter" (song), by Avenged Sevenfold, 2018
- The Madhatter, an EP by Bigelf, 2003
- "Mad Hatter", a song by The Stranglers from Aural Sculpture, 1984
- "Mad Hatter", a song by Lynyrd Skynyrd from Vicious Cycle, 2003
- "Mad Hatter", a song by Melanie Martinez from Cry Baby, 2015
- "The Mad Hatter", a song by Cast from Mother Nature Calls, 1997

== People with the nickname ==
- Mad Hatter (bank robber) (James Madison, born 1956/57)
- Albert Anastasia (1902–1957), American gangster
- James Larratt Battersby (1907–1955), British fascist and pacifist
- Todd Burns (born 1963), American baseball player
- Don Ebert (born 1959), American soccer player
- Clyde Hatter (1908–1937), American baseball player
- Les Miles (born 1953), American football coach
- Gregory Scarpa (1928–1994), American capo and hitman
- Leon Wilkeson (1952–2001), musician with Lynyrd Skynyrd

== Other uses ==
- Mad Hatter (horse) (born 1916), an American Thoroughbred horse
- MadHatters, an a cappella group at the University of Wisconsin–Madison
- Mad hatter disease, or erethism, an occupational disease among hatmakers
- Danbury Mad Hatters, an American ice hockey team
- 492nd Fighter Squadron, U.S. Air Force, nicknamed The Madhatters

== See also ==
- Mad as a hatter (disambiguation)
- Hatter (disambiguation)
- The Mad Hatter Mystery, a 1933 detective story by John Dickson Carr
