= Mubarakpur railway station =

Railway station in Punjab, Pakistan

Mubarakpur Railway Station مبارک پور ریلوے اسٹیشن

General information
- Coordinates: 29.2395°N 71.3716°E
- Owner: Ministry of Railways
- Line: Karachi–Peshawar Railway Line

Other information
- Station code: MBK

Services
Preceding station	Pakistan Railways	Following station
Dera Nawab Sahib towards Kiamari	Karachi–Peshawar Line	Kalanchwala towards Peshawar Cantonment
Location

Mubarakpur Railway Station (Urdu and Punjabi: مبارک پور ریلوے اسٹیشن) is located in Mubarakpur village, Bahawalpur district of Punjab province, Pakistan.

== See also ==
- List of railway stations in Pakistan
- Pakistan Railways
