= Hattar, Pakistan =

Coordinates: 33°51′1″N 72°51′8″E

Hattdd ar
- Town and union council
- Interactive map of Hattdd ar
- Country: Pakistan
- Region: Khyber Pakhtunkhwa
- District: Haripur District
- Time zone: UTC+5 (PST)

Hattar (Urdu: حطار) is one of the 44 union councils, administrative subdivisions, of Haripur District in the Khyber Pakhtunkhwa province of Pakistan. It is located south of the district capital, Haripur, at 33°51'1N 72°51'8E and borders Taxila Tehsil of Punjab province.

== Industrial Estate Hattar ==
Industrial Estate Hattar is situated 16 kilometer at Kot Najibullah. It was established in 1985–86 on a total area of 1,032 acres (4.18 km^{2}) of land. There are around 400+ operational units that are mainly composed of food and beverage, textiles, crockery, paper printing, chemicals, cement, publishing, chemical, rubber, carpets, and leather products. It is served by Hattar railway station.
