= Khunjerab Railway =

Proposed railway line in Pakistan

Khunjerab Railway خنجراب ریل راستہ
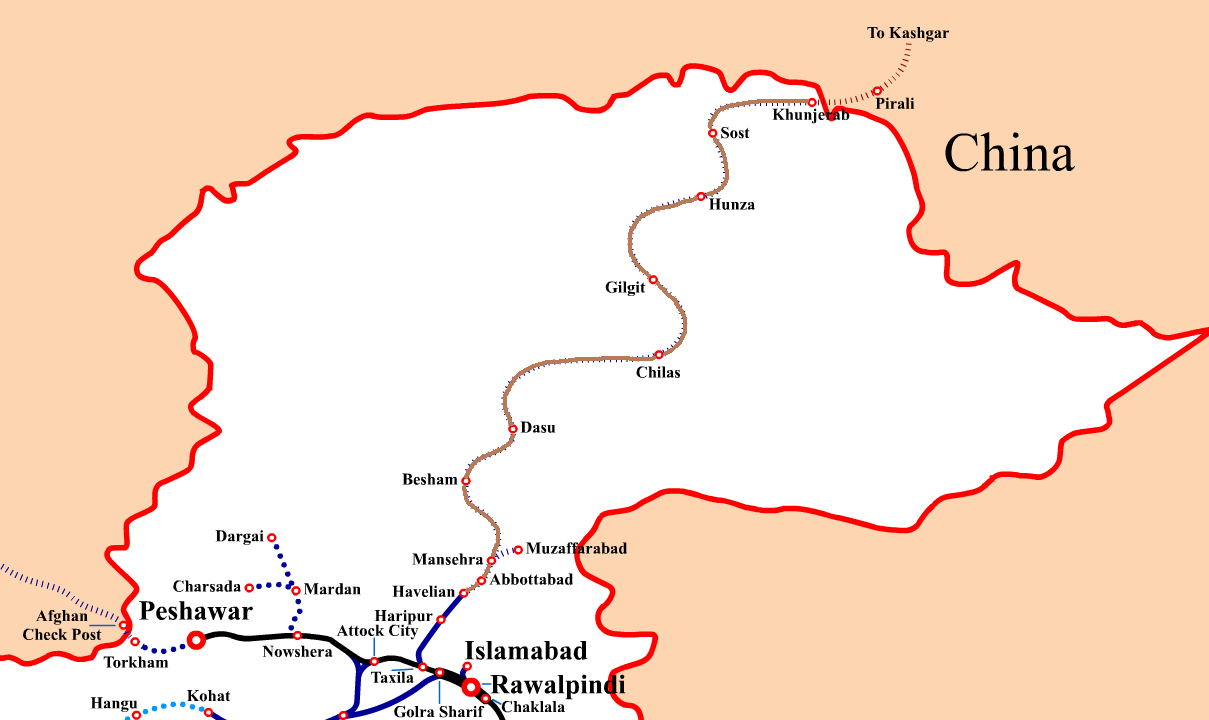
- The proposed route of the Khunjerab Railway is indicated by the brown line

Overview
- Other name: China–Pakistan railway
- Status: Semi-Planned
- Owner: Pakistan Railways
- Termini: Taxila Junction; Khunjerab
- Stations: 7

Service
- Operator: Pakistan Railways

Technical
- Line length: 737 km (458 mi)
- Track gauge: 5 ft 6 in (1,676 mm)
- Operating speed: 30 km/h (19 mph) to 50 km/h (31 mph)

Khunjerab Railway (Urdu: خنجراب ریل راستہ), also known as the China–Pakistan railway and ML-5, is a semi-planned railway line in Pakistan, passing through the region of Kashmir. The current active line begins from Taxila Junction station and ends at Havelian station. A proposed extension will see new track laid from Havelian station to the Pakistan-China border at the Khunjerab Pass where it will link up with China's Kashgar–Hotan railway.

== History ==
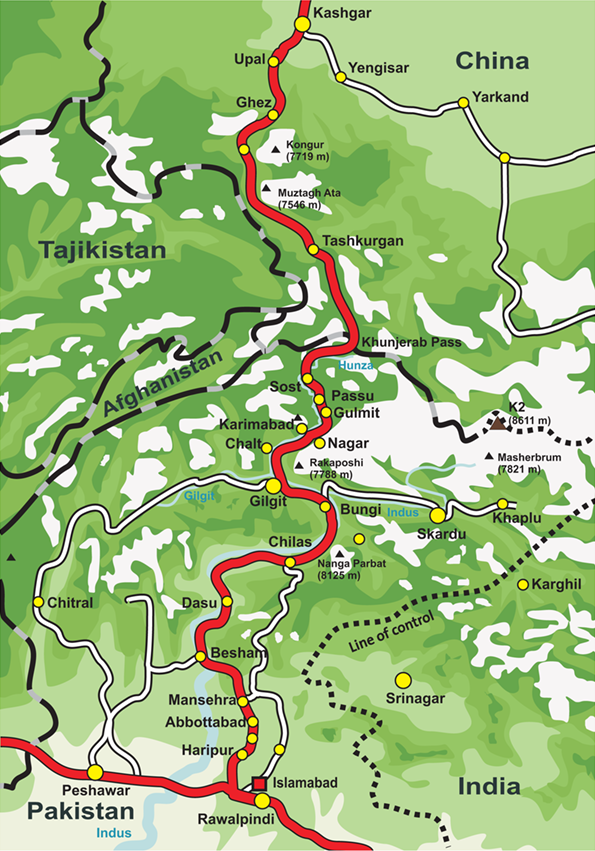
Karakoram Highway route map

In 2007, consultants were engaged to investigate the construction of a railway through the Khunjerab Pass in Gilgit-Baltistan to connect China Railway with Pakistan Railways. A feasibility study started in November 2009 for a line connecting Havelian and Kashgar. 750 km (466 mi) of the line would extend through Pakistan, while the remaining 350 km (217 mi) in China. In June 2014, China commissioned a "preliminary research study" to build an international rail link to Pakistan. In 2016 this 682 km proposed railway link was reported to be part of the China–Pakistan Economic Corridor, and was to commence construction during the second phase of CPEC between 2018 and 2022. However the construction of this railway line was not mentioned in the CPEC Long Term Plan from 2017 to 2030 released jointly by China and Pakistan in 2017. China's involvement in several rail projects in Pakistan is motivated primarily by commercial considerations, but it also sees distinct advantages for its improved transportation and access to Central Asia and the Persian Gulf states.

== Route ==
The stations on this line are as follows:

Active Line

- Taxila Cantonment Junction
- Mohra Shah Wali (Abandoned)
- Usman Khattar
- Farooqia (Abandoned)
- Hattar (Abandoned)
- Kot Najib Ullah
- Haripur Hazara
- Serai Saleh Halt
- Baldher
- Havelian

Proposed Line

- Abbottabad
- Mansehra
- Besham
- Dasu
- Chilas
- Gilgit
- Hunza
- Sost
- Khunjerab

== Cost ==
Pakistan awarded a Rs72 million (US$1.2 million) contract to an international consortium to carry out a feasibility study for establishing a rail link with China to boost trade relations between the two countries.

== See also ==
- Karachi–Peshawar Line
- Railway lines in Pakistan
