= Liaquat Pur railway station =

Railway station in Liaqatpur, Pakistan

Coordinates: 28.9370°N 70.9461°E

Liaquatpur Railway Station لِياقت پُور ریلوے اسٹیشن
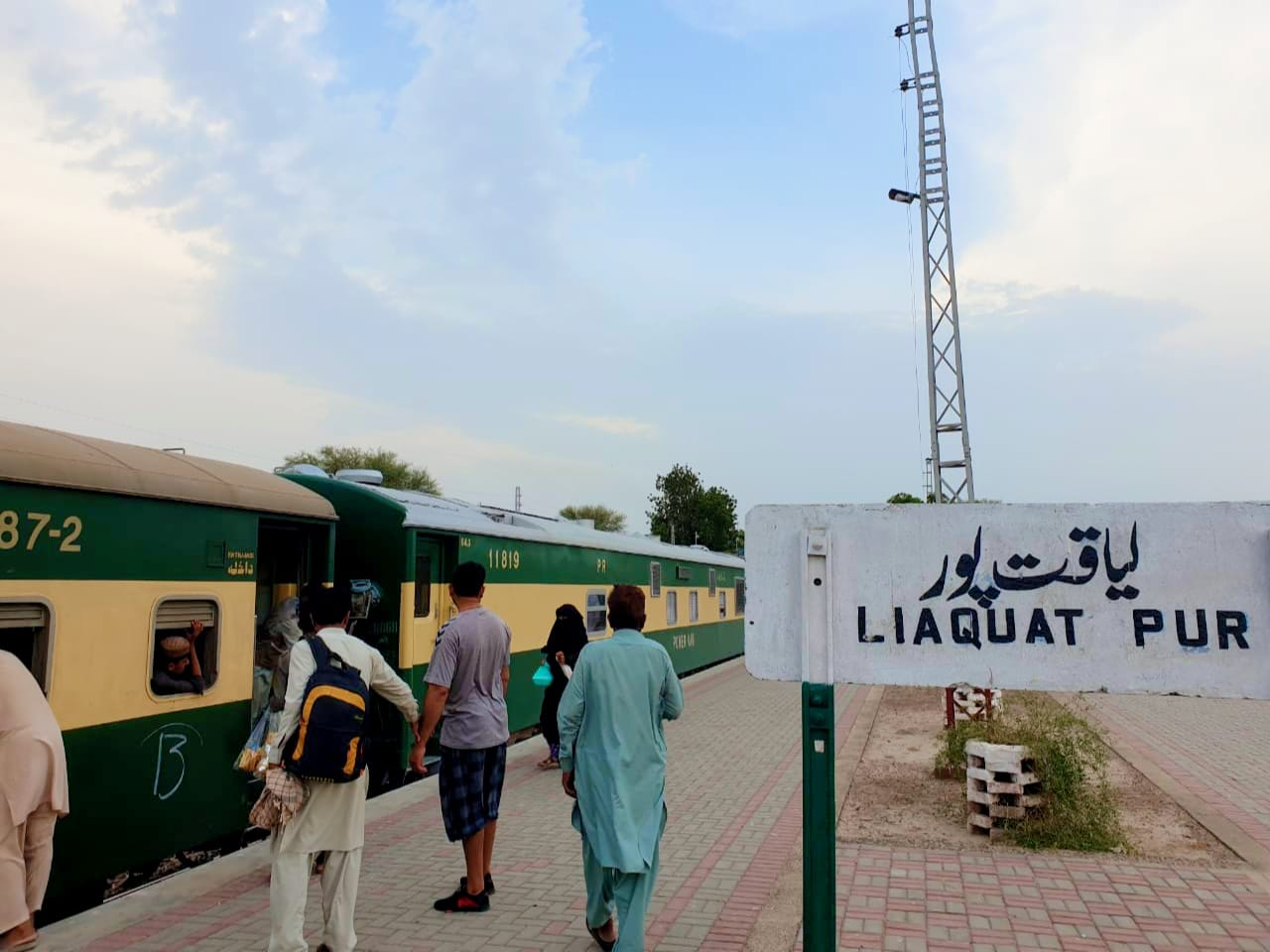

General information
- Owner: Ministry of Railways
- Line: Karachi–Peshawar Railway Line

Construction
- Structure type: Standard (on ground station)

Other information
- Station code: LQP

History
- Opened: 1903
- Former names: Chaudri Railway Station

Services
Preceding station	Pakistan Railways	Following station
Firoza towards Kiamari	Karachi–Peshawar Line	Chanigot towards Peshawar Cantonment
Location

Liaquatpur Railway Station (Urdu and Punjabi: لِياقت پُور ریلوے اسٹیشن) is located in Liaquat Pur on main railway line. From north it becomes the first railway station in Rahim Yar Khan district. The railway station is centered in the city's territory as it divides the city into two parts. The right side of the city is called Kachi Mandi while the opposite is known as Pakki Mandi. The railway line was first planned in 1883 when it was in British India. In 1889 a single line of a broad gauge was laid. Later it became a two line link and in 1903 a station was built here and was named after this town "Chaudri". After the independence of Pakistan, in 1956 the name was changed to Liaquat Pur in honour of Pakistan's first Prime Minister Liaquat Ali Khan.

== See also ==
- List of railway stations in Pakistan
- Pakistan Railways
- Liaquat Pur
- History of rail transport in Pakistan
- Ministry of Railways (Pakistan)
- Transport in Pakistan
