= Havelian railway station =

Railway station in Pakistan

Havelian Railway Station حویلیاں ریلوے اسٹیشن
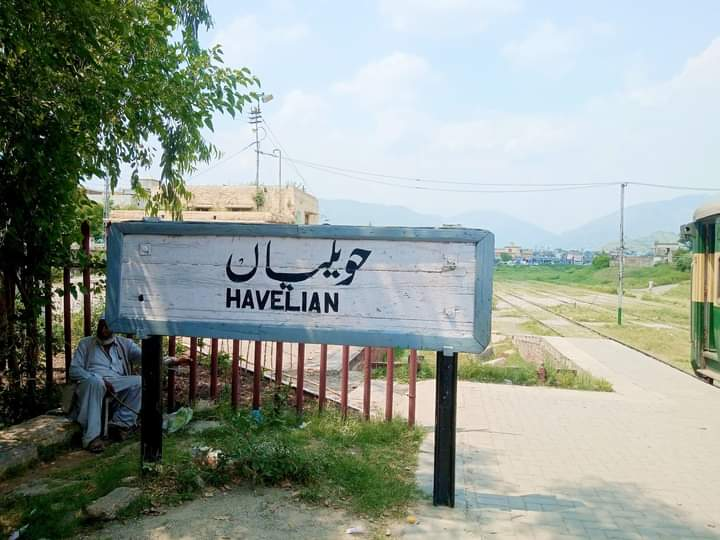
- Havelian railway station

General information
- Coordinates: 34.0522°N 73.1580°E
- Owner: Ministry of Railways
- Line: Taxila–Khunjerab Railway Line

Other information
- Station code: HVN

History
- Opened: 1913

Services
Preceding station	Pakistan Railways	Following station
Baldher towards Taxila Cantonment Junction	Taxila–Khunjerab Line	Terminus
Location

Havelian Railway Station (Urdu: حویلیاں ریلوے اسٹیشن) is located in Havelian, Khyber Pakhtunkhwa, Pakistan.

== See also ==
- List of railway stations in Pakistan
- Pakistan Railways

== Gallery ==
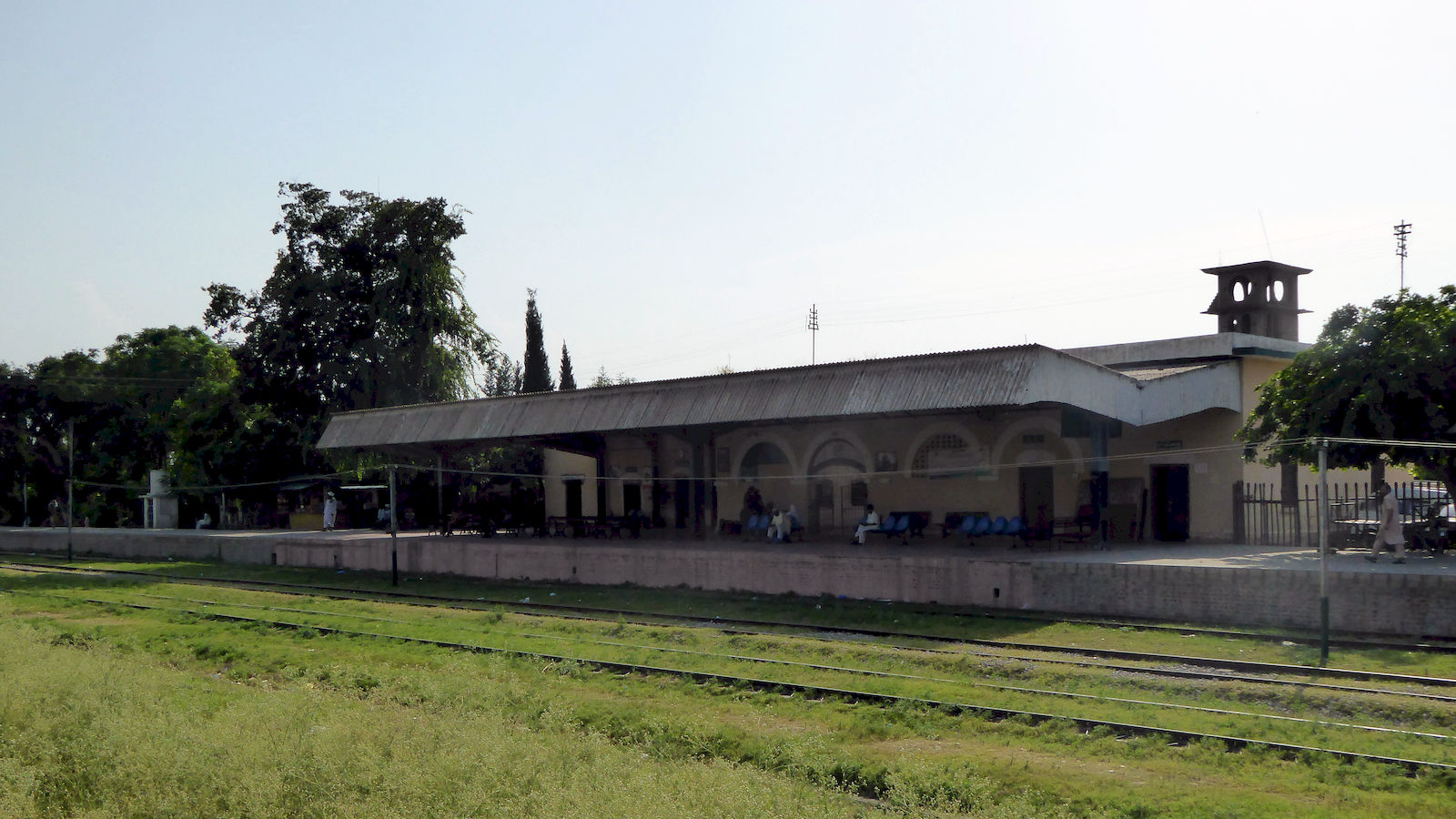

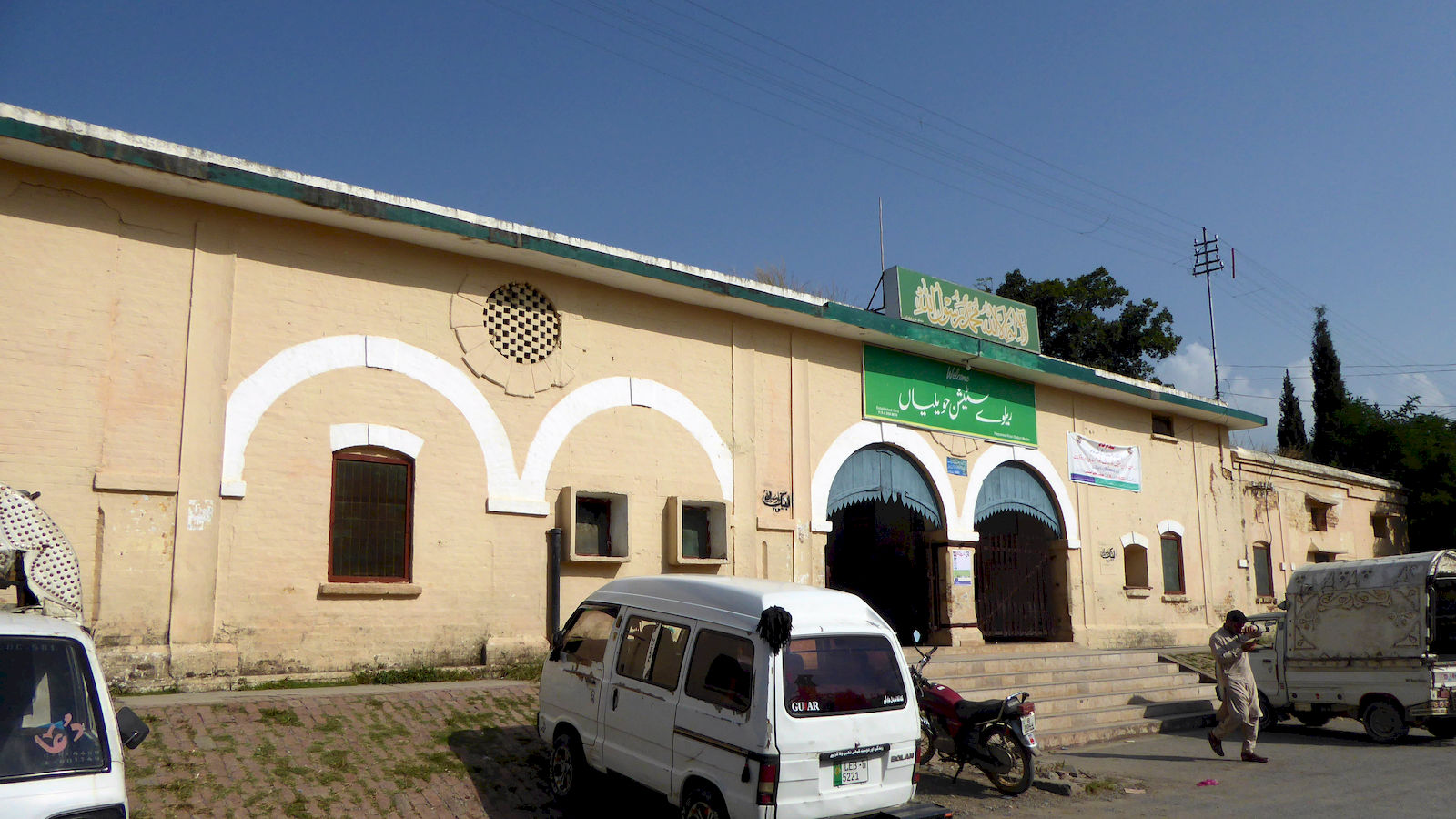
