= Taxila Cantonment Junction railway station =

Railway station in Punjab, Pakistan

Taxila Cantonment Junction Station ٹیکسلا کینٹ جنکشن اسٹیشن
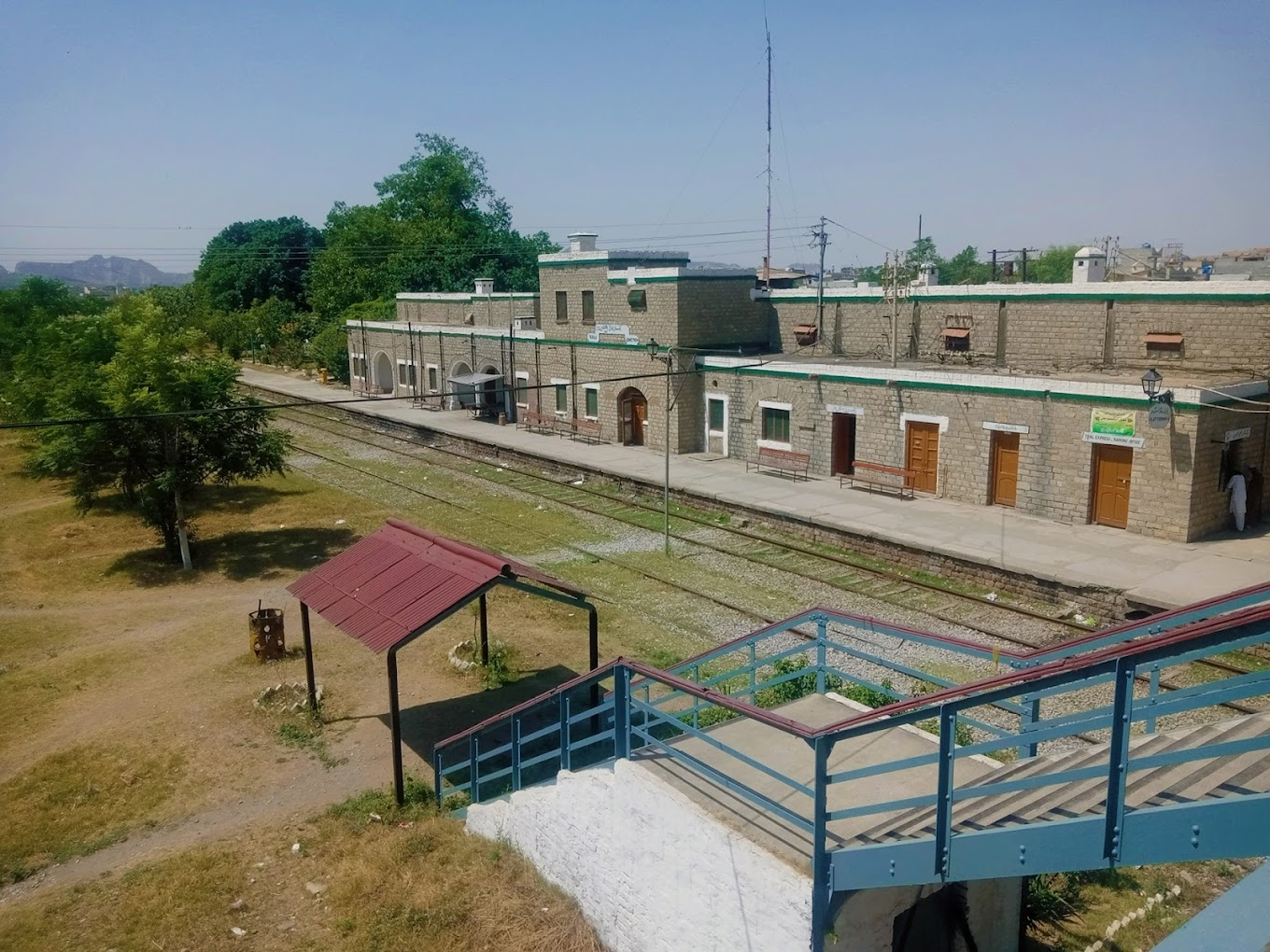

General information
- Location: Station Road, Taxila, Punjab 47070; Pakistan
- Coordinates: 33.7420°N 72.8145°E
- Elevation: 515 metres (1,690 ft)
- Owner: Ministry of Railways
- Lines: Karachi–Peshawar Railway Line; Taxila-Khunjerab Railway Line

Construction
- Structure type: Standard (on-ground station)

Other information
- Status: Functioning
- Station code: TXLC

History
- Opened: 1881

Services
Preceding station	Pakistan Railways	Following station
Sangjani towards Kiamari	Karachi–Peshawar Line	Wah Cantonment towards Peshawar Cantonment
Terminus	Taxila–Khunjerab Line	Usman Khattar towards Khunjerab Junction
Location
- Location within Punjab, Pakistan Location within Pakistan

Taxila Cantonment Junction Railway Station (Urdu and Punjabi: ٹیکسلا کینٹ جنکشن ریلوے اسٹیشن) is located in Taxila cantonment area near Taxila, Rawalpindi district of Punjab province, Pakistan. It serves as a junction for Havelian.

== See also ==
- List of railway stations in Pakistan
- Pakistan Railways

== Gallery ==
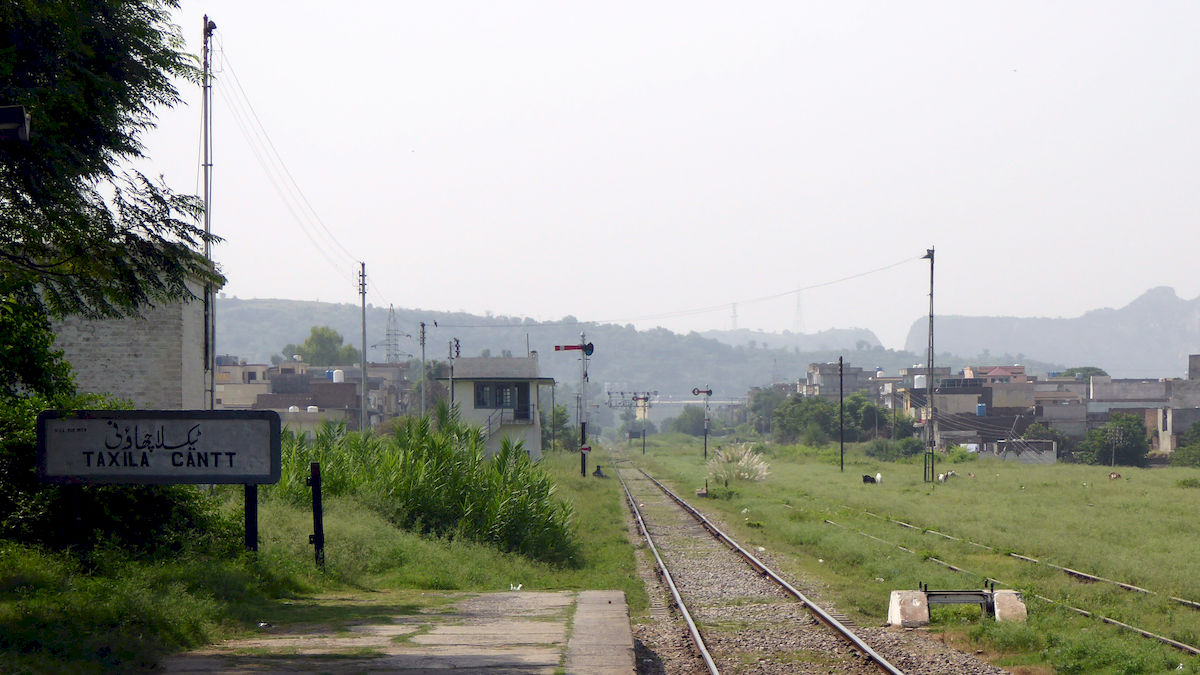
View towards Karachi

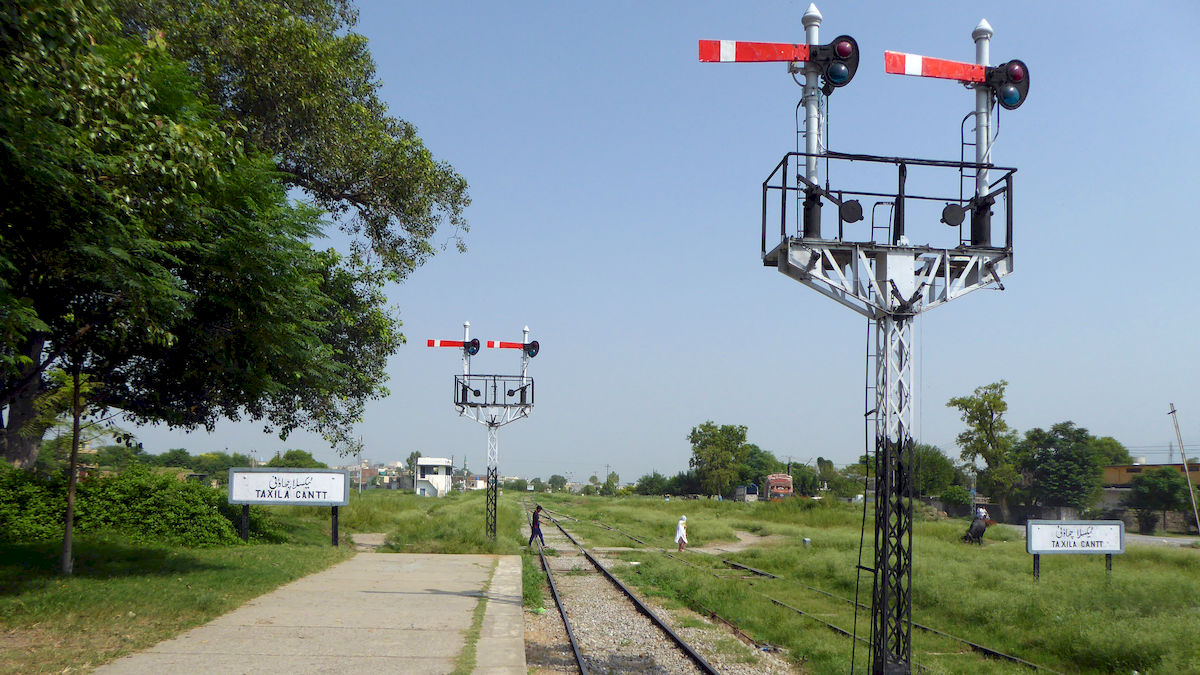
View towards Peshawar

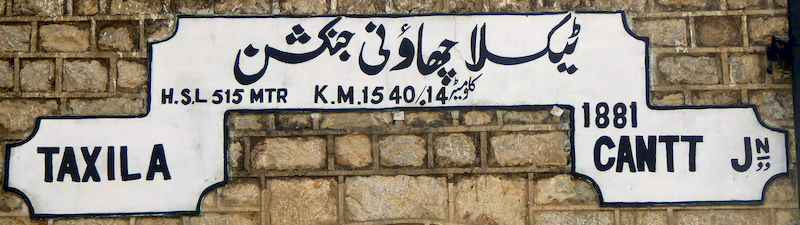
Taxila Cantt railway station tag
