= Golra Sharif–Basal Branch Line =

Golra - Basal railway Line

Basal Junction-Golra Sharif Junction Branch Line

Overview
- Owner: Pakistan Railways
- Termini: Basal Junction; Golra Sharif Junction
- Stations: 7

Service
- Operator: Pakistan Railways

Technical
- Line length: 75 km (47 mi)
- Operating speed: 70 km/h (43 mph)

Golra Sharif–Basal Branch Line (Urdu: گولڑہ شریف-بسال برانچ لائن) is one of several branch lines in Pakistan, operated and maintained by Pakistan Railways. The line begins from Golra Sharif Junction and ends at Basal Junction. The total length of this railway line is 75 kilometers (47 mi). There are seven railway stations from Golra Sharif Junction to Basal Junction. At present, two trains are running on this line which are Mehr Express and Kohat Express.

== Stations ==
- Golra Sharif Junction
- Tarnol
- Kutbal (Abandoned)
- Fateh Jang
- Gagan
- Mirjal (Abandoned)
- Chauntra (Abandoned)
- Kahal
- Basal Sharif
- Basal Junction
