= Kohat Express =

Kohat Express کوہاٹ ایکسپریس
Overview
- Service type: Inter-city rail
- First service: 2018
- Current operator: Pakistan Railways

Route
- Termini: Rawalpindi; Kohat Cantonment
- Stops: 09
- Distance travelled: 177 kilometres (110 mi)
- Average journey time: 4 hours
- Service frequency: Daily
- Train numbers: 133UP (Rawalpindi→Kohat Cantonment); 134DN (Kohat Cantonment→Rawalpindi)

On-board services
- Class: Economy
- Seating arrangements: yes
- Baggage facilities: yes

Technical
- Track gauge: 1,676 mm (5 ft 6 in)
- Track owner: Pakistan Railways

Kohat Express (Urdu: کوہاٹ ایکسپریس) is a passenger train operated daily by Pakistan Railways between Rawalpindi and Kohat Cantonment. The trip takes approximately four hours to cover a published distance of 177 kilometres (110 mi), traveling along a stretch of the Karachi–Peshawar Railway Line, Golra Sharif–Basal Branch Line, Kotri-Attock Railway Line and Jand–Thal Railway Line. People have been demanding to run another passenger train on this route, but no other is started yet.

== Route ==
- Rawalpindi–Golra Sharif Junction via Karachi–Peshawar Railway Line
- Golra Sharif Junction–Basal Junction via Golra Sharif-Basal Branch Line
- Basal Junction–Jand Junction via Kotri-Attock Railway Line
- Jand Junction–Kohat Cantonment via Jand–Thal Branch Line

== Station stops ==
- Rawalpindi
- Golra Sharif Junction
- Tarnol
- Fateh Jang
- Kahal
- Basal Sharif
- Basal Junction
- Domel
- Jand Junction
- Babari Banda
- Kohat Cantonment

== History ==
The train service was discontinued in May 2013 because the railway ministry was not generating profit on this route. The train was restarted due to public demand by railway minister Khawaja Saad Rafique on 24 January 2018 in a ceremony held at Kohat Cantonment railway station.

== Equipment ==
Kohat Express only offers economy class seating.
