= Kahi (disambiguation) =

Kahi (born Park Ji-young, 1980) is a South Korean singer, dancer and actress.

Kahi may also refer to:

== Places ==
- Kahi, Iran, a village in South Khorasan province, Iran
- Kahi, Hangu district, Pakistan, a village
- Kahi, Nowshera district, Pakistan, a village
- Kahi railway station, Khyber Pakhtunkhwa, Pakistan

== Other uses ==
- KAHI, a radio station licensed to Auburn, California, U.S.
- Kahi (food), Iraqi breakfast dish
- Kahi Lee, an American interior designer and TV host
- Sihi Kahi Chandru, Indian actor
- Sihi Kahi Geetha, Indian actress
- Tearepa Kahi, New Zealand director
- Kahi (film)
