= Chauntra =

Chauntra may refer to:

== India ==
- Chauntra Assembly constituency, former constituency of the Himachal Pradesh legislative assembly in India
- Chauntra, Himachal Pradesh, in Mandi district, Himachal Pradesh, India
- Chauntra, Punjab, in Muktsar district, Punjab, India

== Pakistan ==
- Chauntra railway station, in Punjab, Pakistan
