= KHY =

KHY may refer to:

- Kahi railway station, in Kahi, Khyber Pakhtunkhwa, Pakistan
- Khoy airport, an airport near Khoy, Iran
- Khyber Afghan Airlines, former Afghanistan-based private cargo airline
- WKHY, radio station in Lafayette, Indiana, U.S.
