= Kutbal railway station =

Railway station in Pakistan

Qutbal Railway Station قطبال ریلوے اسٹیشن
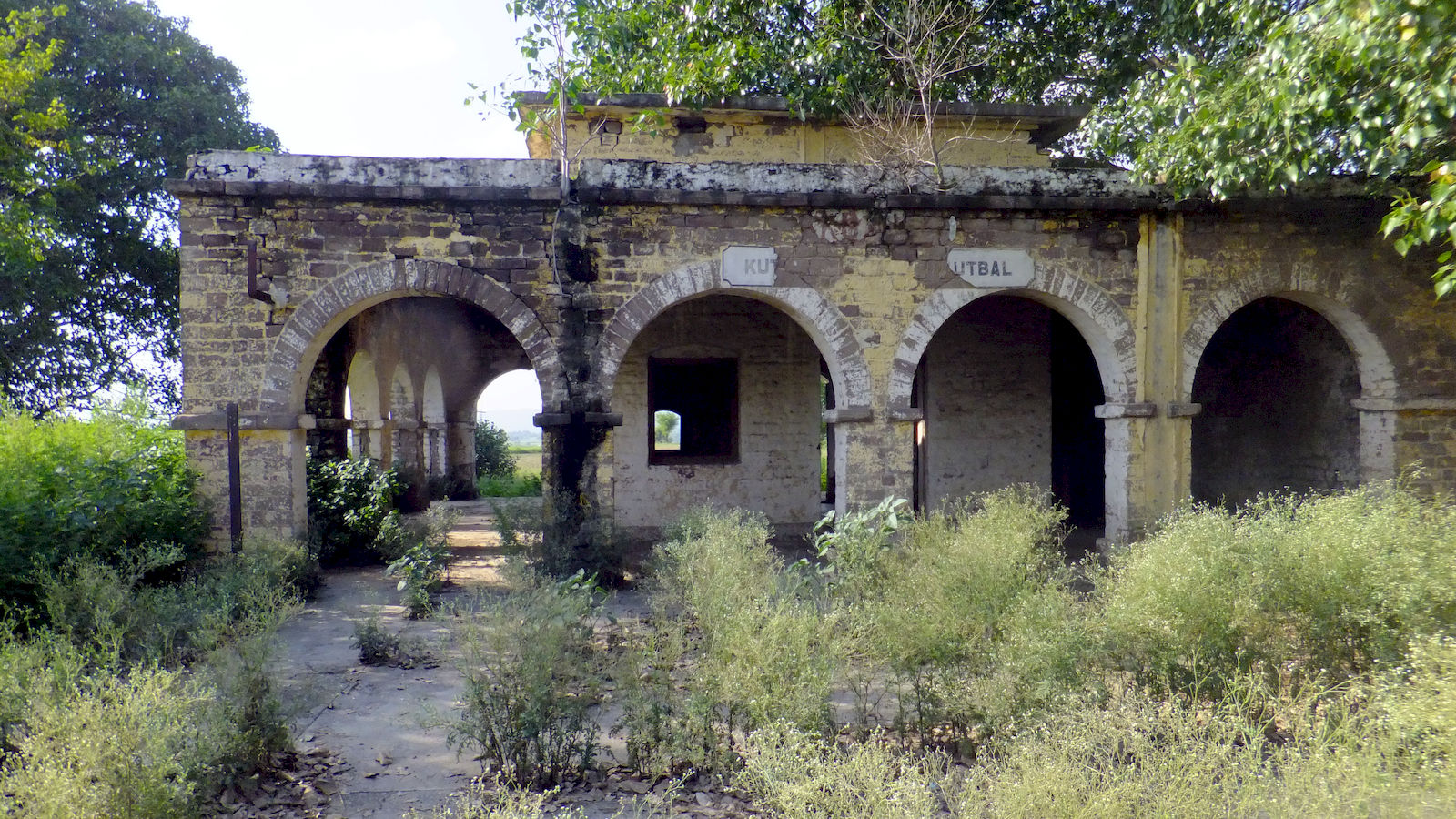

General information
- Location: Qutbal; Pakistan
- Coordinates: 33.5773°N 72.7616°E
- Owner: Ministry of Railways
- Line: Khushalgarh–Kohat–Thal Railway

Other information
- Station code: KTB

Services
Preceding station	Pakistan Railways	Following station
Tarnol towards Golra Sharif Junction	Khushalgarh–Kohat–Thal Railway	Fatehjang towards Thal
Location
- Location within Pakistan

Qutbal Railway Station (Urdu: قطبال ریلوے اسٹیشن) is located in Attock District of Punjab, Pakistan.

== See also ==
- List of railway stations in Pakistan
- Pakistan Railways

== Gallery ==
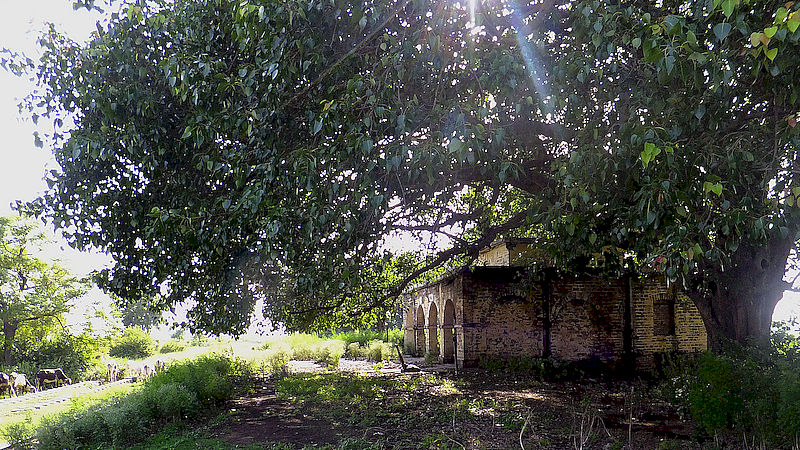
Kutbal railway station side view, 2019
