= Seni Gumbat Halt railway station =

Railway station in Pakistan

Seni Gumbat Halt Railway Station

General information
- Coordinates: 33.502525°N 71.671279°E
- Owner: Ministry of Railways
- Line: Jand–Thal Railway

Other information
- Station code: SGB

Services
Preceding station	Pakistan Railways	Following station
Tilkan towards Golra Sharif Junction	Khushalgarh–Kohat–Thal Railway	Babari Banda towards Thal
Location

Seni Gumbat Halt Railway Station (Urdu: سنی گمبٹ ریلوے اسٹیشن) is located in Gumbat, Kohat District, Khyber Pakhtunkhwa, Pakistan.

== See also ==
- List of railway stations in Pakistan
- Pakistan Railways
