= Fateh Jang railway station =

Railway station in Pakistan

Fateh Jang Railway Station فتح جنگ ریلوے اسٹیشن
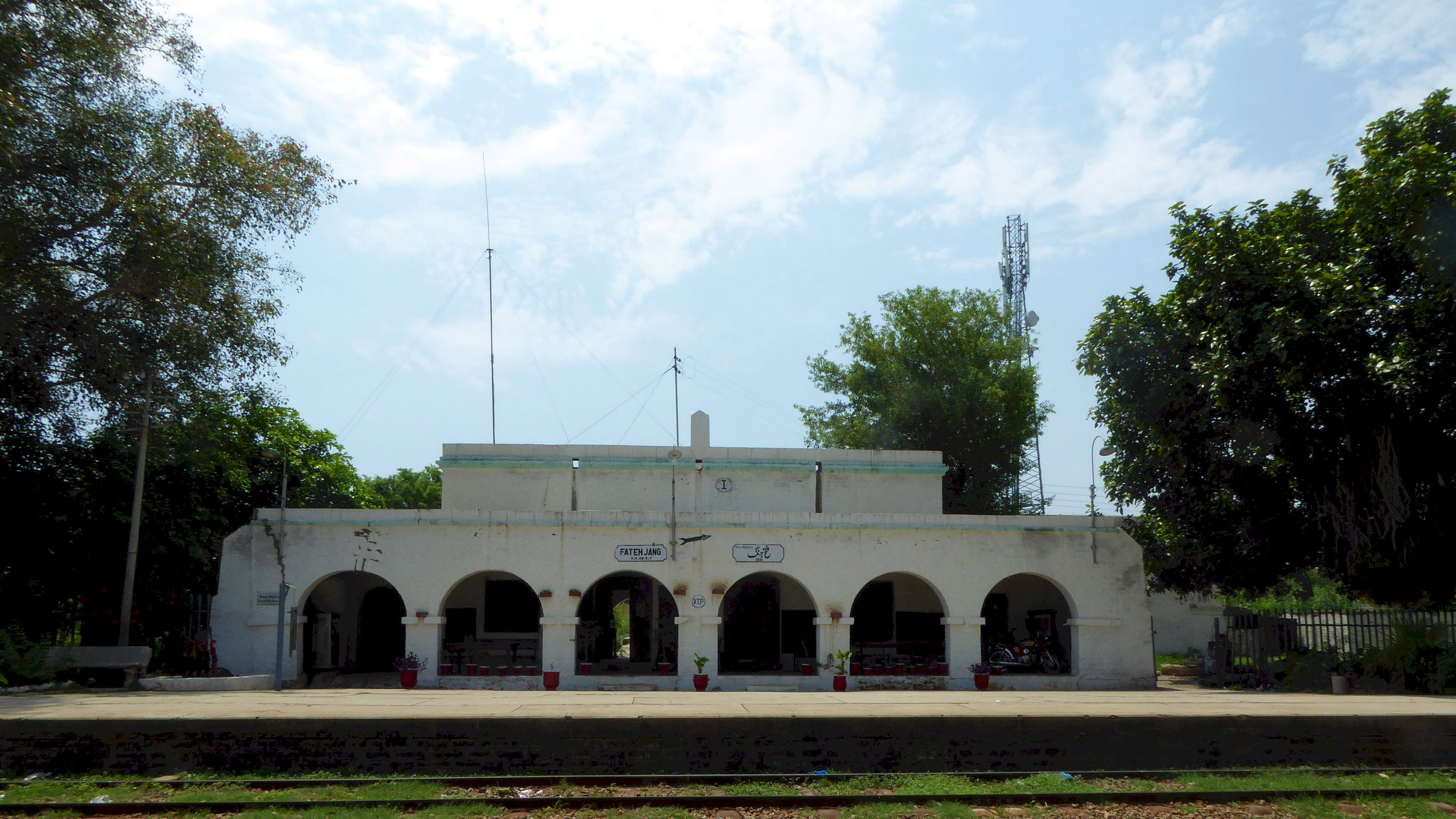
- Station building from across tracks

General information
- Coordinates: 33.5758°N 72.6418°E
- Owner: Ministry of Railways
- Line: Khushalgarh–Kohat–Thal Railway
- Platforms: 1
- Tracks: 3

Construction
- Parking: yes

Other information
- Station code: FJG

Services
| Preceding station | Pakistan Railways | Following station |
|---|---|---|
| Kutbal towards Golra Sharif Junction | Khushalgarh–Kohat–Thal Railway | Gagan towards Thal |
Location

Fateh Jang Railway Station (Urdu: فتح جنگ ریلوے اسٹیشن) is located in Fateh Jang, Attock district, Punjab, Pakistan.

== History ==
Fateh Jang railway station was built by North Western Railways in 1881.

== Services ==
The station is a stoppage of two trains:

- Kohat Express
- Mehr Express

== See also ==
- List of railway stations in Pakistan
- Pakistan Railways

== Gallery ==
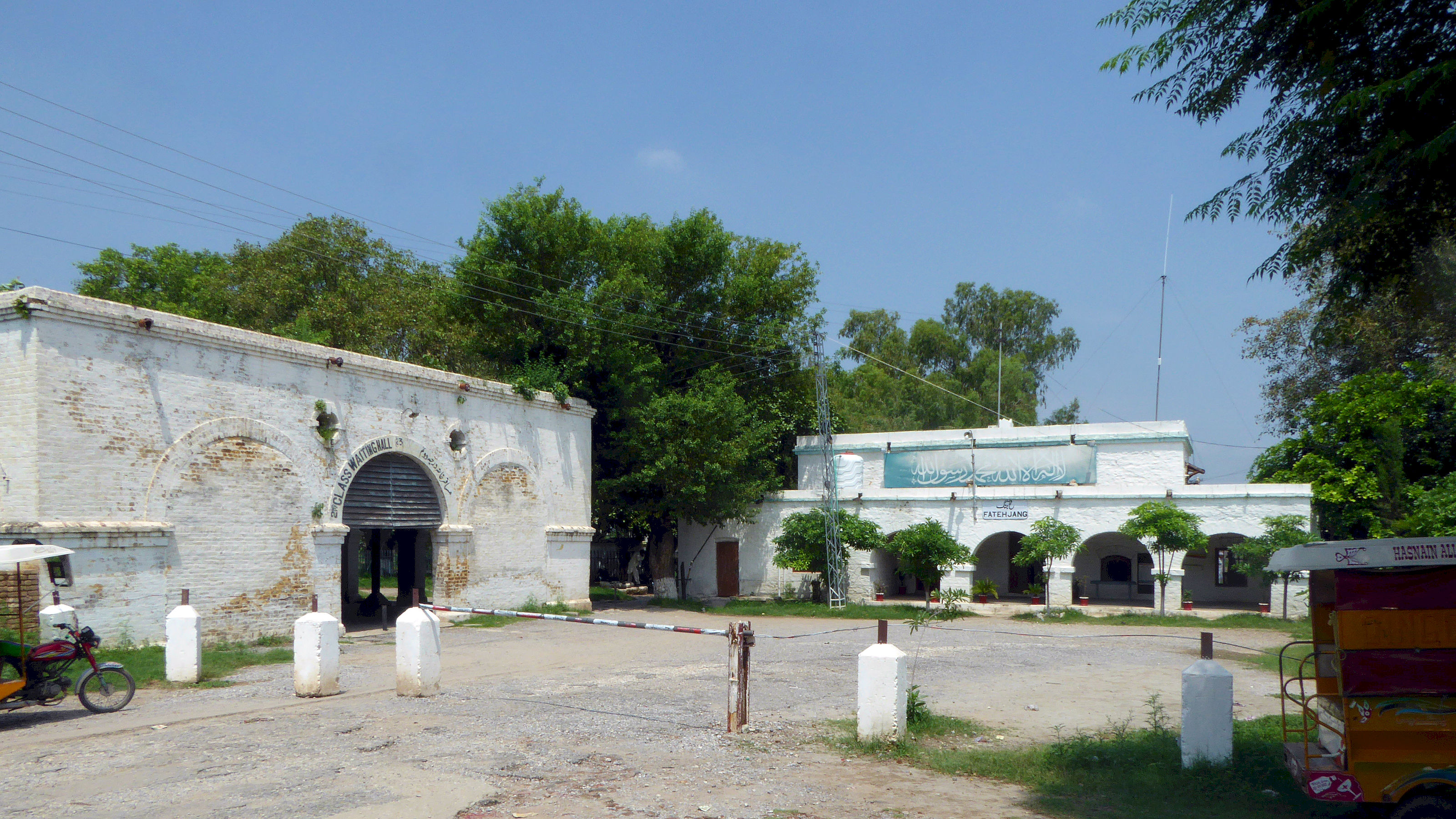
View from road

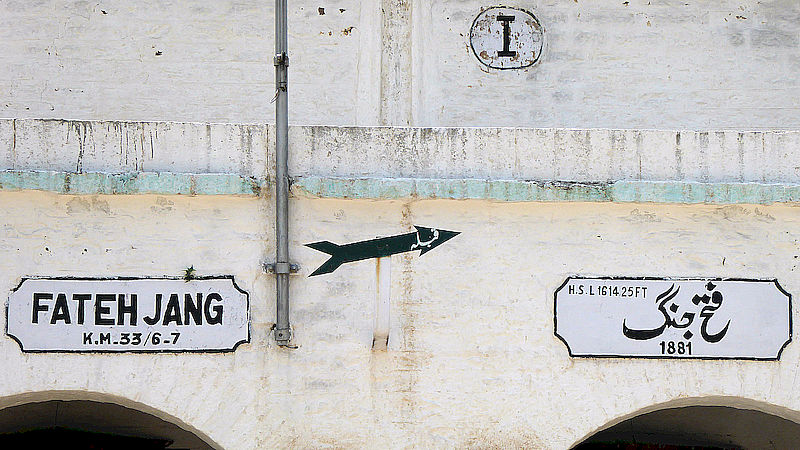
Railway station tag

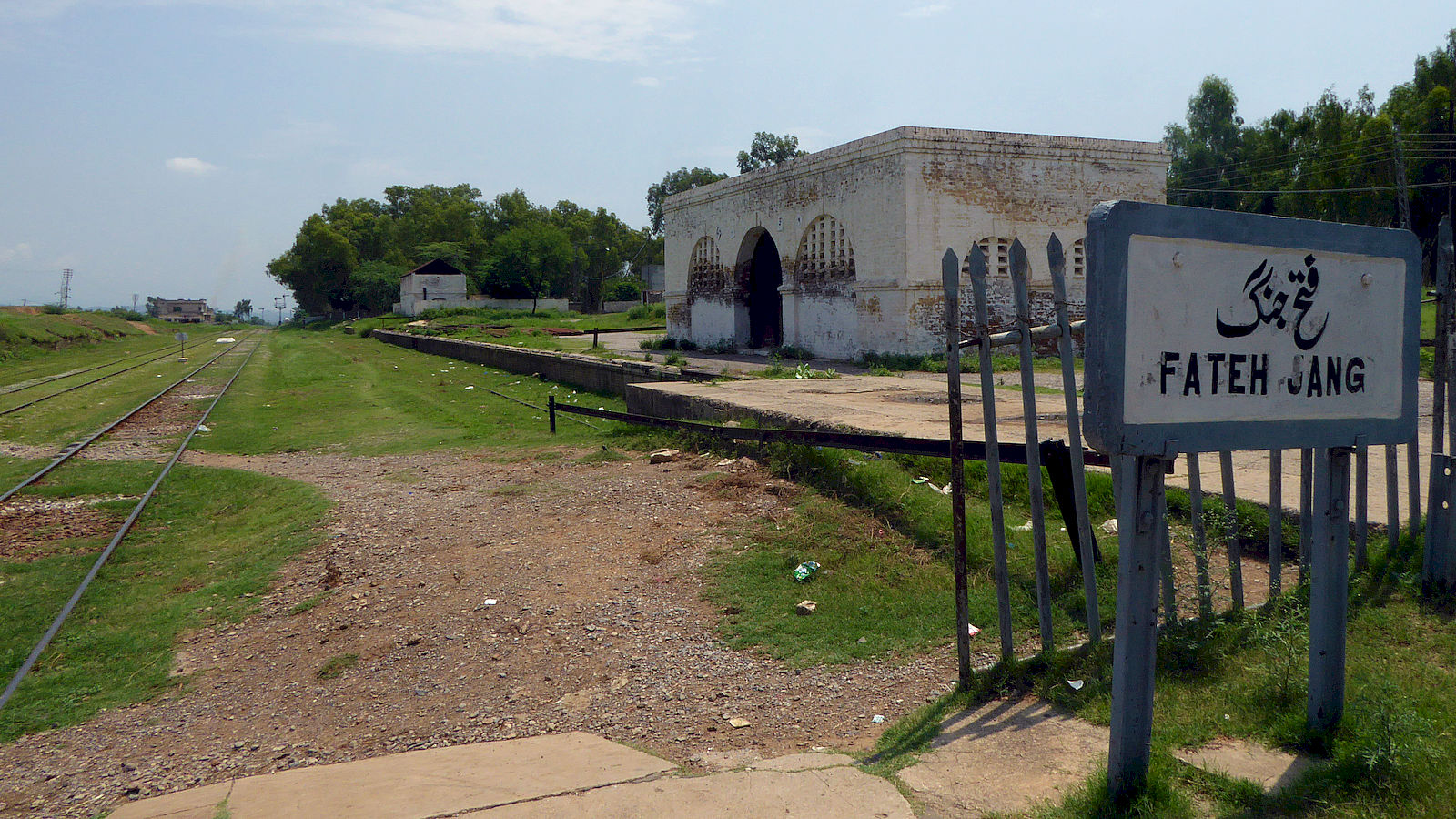
View towards Golra Sharif

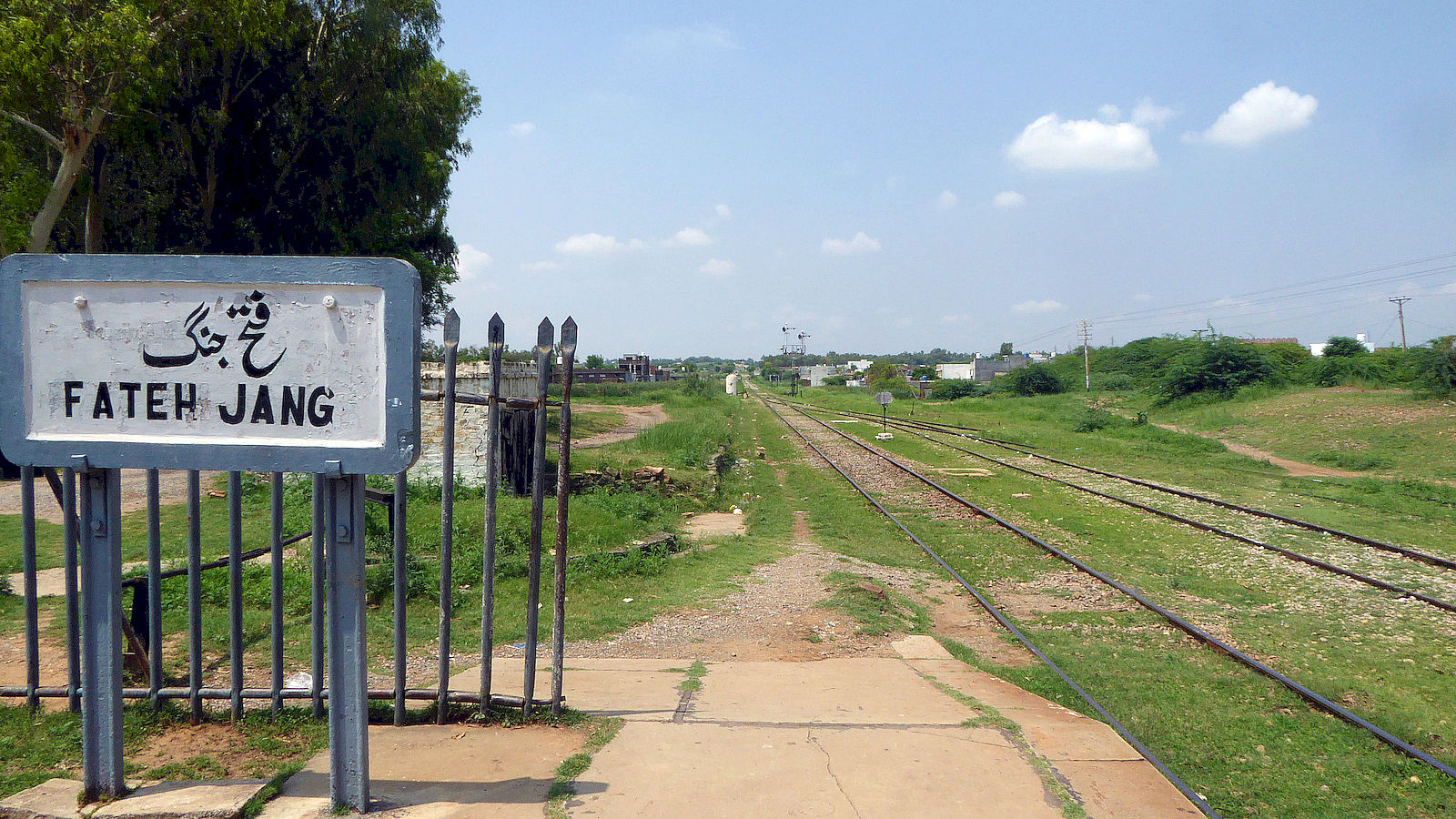
View towards Kohat
