= Khushal Garh railway station =

Railway station in Pakistan

Khushal Garh Railway Station

General information
- Owner: Ministry of Railways
- Line: Jand–Thal Railway

Other information
- Station code: KHG

Services
Preceding station	Pakistan Railways	Following station
Jand Junction towards Golra Sharif Junction	Khushalgarh–Kohat–Thal Railway	Faqir Hussain Shaheed towards Thal
Location

Khushal Garh Railway Station (Urdu: خوشحال گڑھ ریلوے اسٹیشن) is located in Pakistan.

== See also ==
- List of railway stations in Pakistan
- Pakistan Railways
