= Gagan railway station =

Railway station in Pakistan

Gagan Railway Station گگن ریلوے اسٹیشن
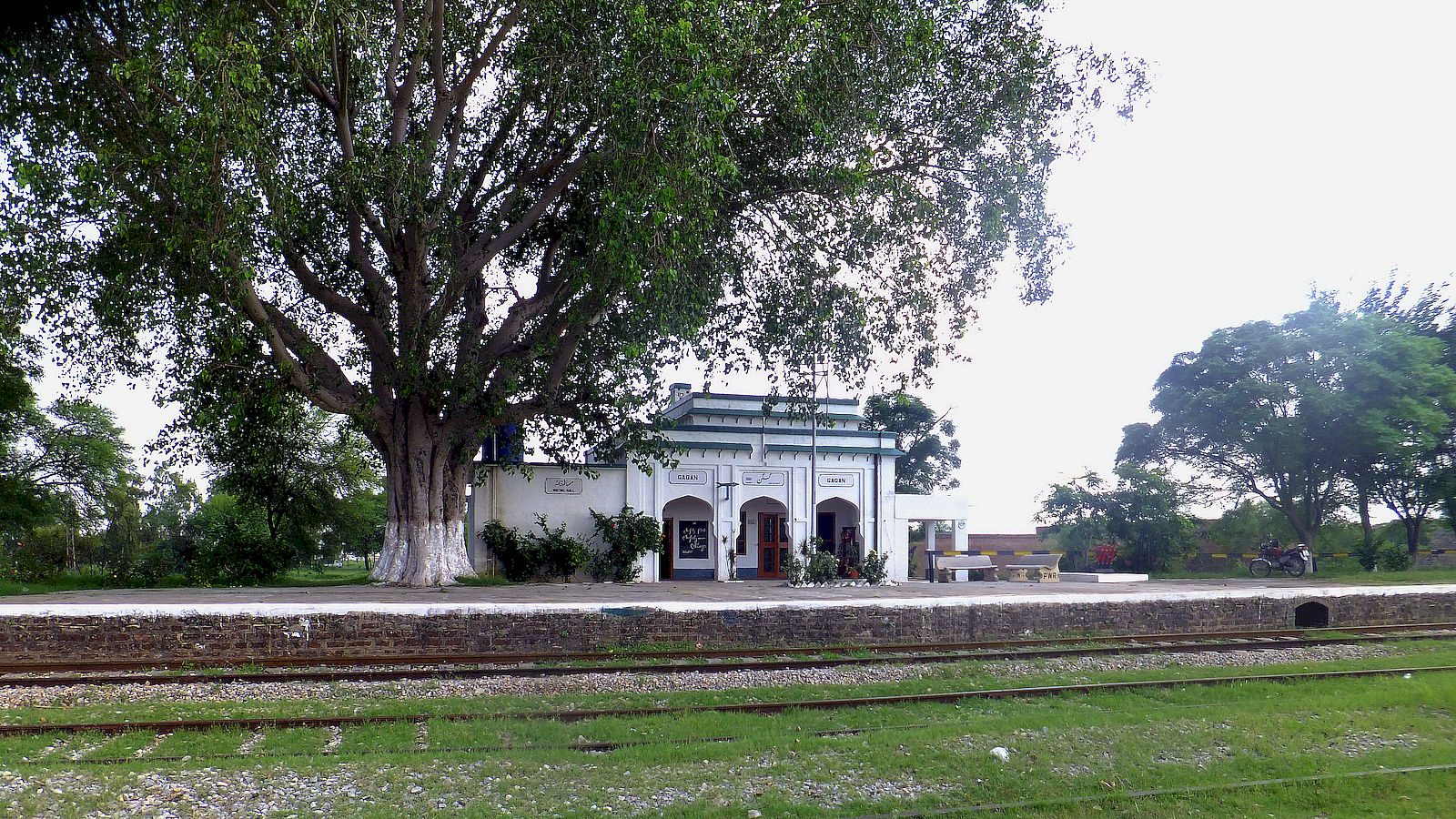

General information
- Coordinates: 33.5389°N 72.5158°E
- Owner: Ministry of Railways
- Line: Khushalgarh–Kohat–Thal Railway
- Platforms: 1
- Tracks: 2

Other information
- Station code: GGK

Services
Preceding station	Pakistan Railways	Following station
Fatehjang towards Golra Sharif Junction	Khushalgarh–Kohat–Thal Railway	Chauntra towards Thal
Location

Gagan Railway Station (Urdu: گگن ریلوے اسٹیشن) is located in Pakistan.

The station was built in 1881.

== See also ==
- List of railway stations in Pakistan
- Pakistan Railways

== Gallery ==
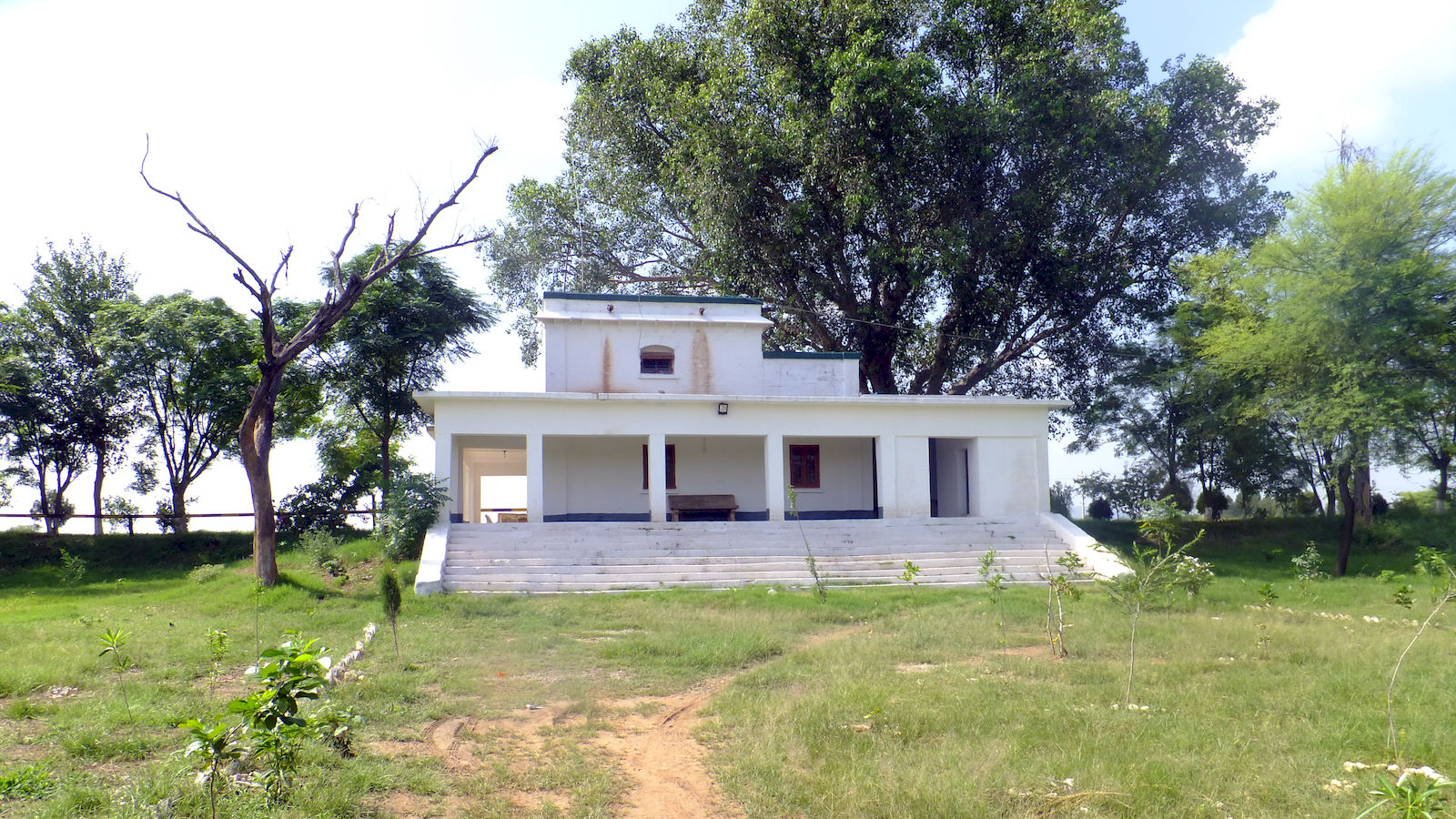
Gagan railway station external view

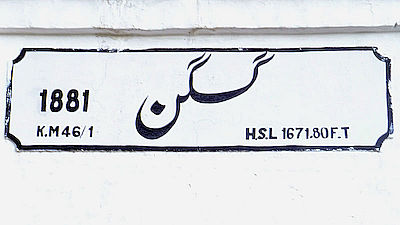
Gagan railway station tag
