= Tilkan railway station =

Railway station in Pakistan

Coordinates: 33.503058°N 71.800944°E

Tilkan Railway Station

General information
- Owner: Ministry of Railways
- Line: Khushalgarh–Kohat–Thal Railway

Other information
- Station code: TKX

Services
Preceding station	Pakistan Railways	Following station
Faqir Hussain Shaheed towards Golra Sharif Junction	Khushalgarh–Kohat–Thal Railway	Seni Gambat towards Thal
Location

Tilkan Railway Station (Urdu: تیلکان ریلوے اسٹیشن) is located in Pakistan.

== See also ==
- List of railway stations in Pakistan
- Pakistan Railways
