= Cadet College Kohat railway station =

Railway station in Khyber Pakhtunkhwa, Pakistan

Coordinates: 33.5463°N 71.5130°E

Cadet College Kohat Railway Station

General information
- Owner: Ministry of Railways
- Line: Jand–Thal Railway

Other information
- Station code: KTCT

Services
Preceding station	Pakistan Railways	Following station
Babari Banda towards Golra Sharif Junction	Khushalgarh–Kohat–Thal Railway	Kohat Cantonment towards Thal
Location
- Location within Khyber Pakhtunkhwa Location within Pakistan

Cadet College Kohat Railway Station (Urdu: کیڈٹ کالج کوہاٹ ریلوے اسٹیشن) is located in Kohat, in the Khyber Pakhtunkhwa province of Pakistan. Cadet College Kohat, which gives the station its name, is nearby.

== See also ==
- List of railway stations in Pakistan
- Pakistan Railways
