= Faqir Hussain Shaheed railway station =

Railway station in Pakistan

Faqir Hussain Shaheed Railway Station

General information
- Coordinates: 33.4477°N 72.0228°E
- Owner: Ministry of Railways
- Line: Khushalgarh–Kohat–Thal Railway

Other information
- Station code: FQHD

Services
Preceding station	Pakistan Railways	Following station
Khushal Garh towards Golra Sharif Junction	Khushalgarh–Kohat–Thal Railway	Tilkan towards Thal
Location

Faqir Hussain Shaheed Railway Station (Urdu: فقیر حسین شہید ریلوے اسٹیشن) is located in Pakistan.

== See also ==
- List of railway stations in Pakistan
- Pakistan Railways
