= Kohat Cantonment railway station =

Railway station in Kohat, Pakistan

Coordinates: 33.571554°N 71.450336°E

Kohat Cantonment Railway Station
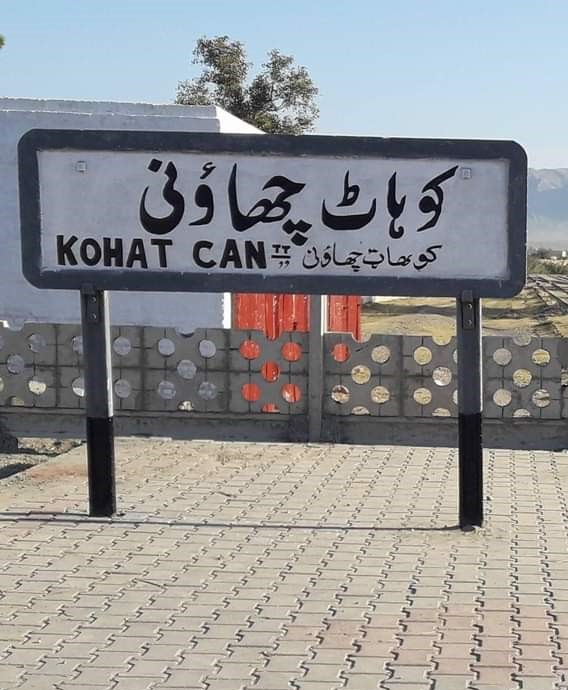

General information
- Owner: Ministry of Railways
- Line: Jand–Thal Railway

Other information
- Station code: KHCT

Services
Preceding station	Pakistan Railways	Following station
Cadet College Kohat towards Golra Sharif Junction	Khushalgarh–Kohat–Thal Railway	Kohat Tehsil towards Thal
Location
- Location within Pakistan

Kohat Cantonment Railway Station (Urdu: کوہاٹ کینٹ ریلوے اسٹیشن) is located in Kohat, in the Khyber Pakhtunkhwa province of Pakistan. The station serves as the terminus for the Khushalgarh–Kohat–Thal Railway line.

== Gallery ==
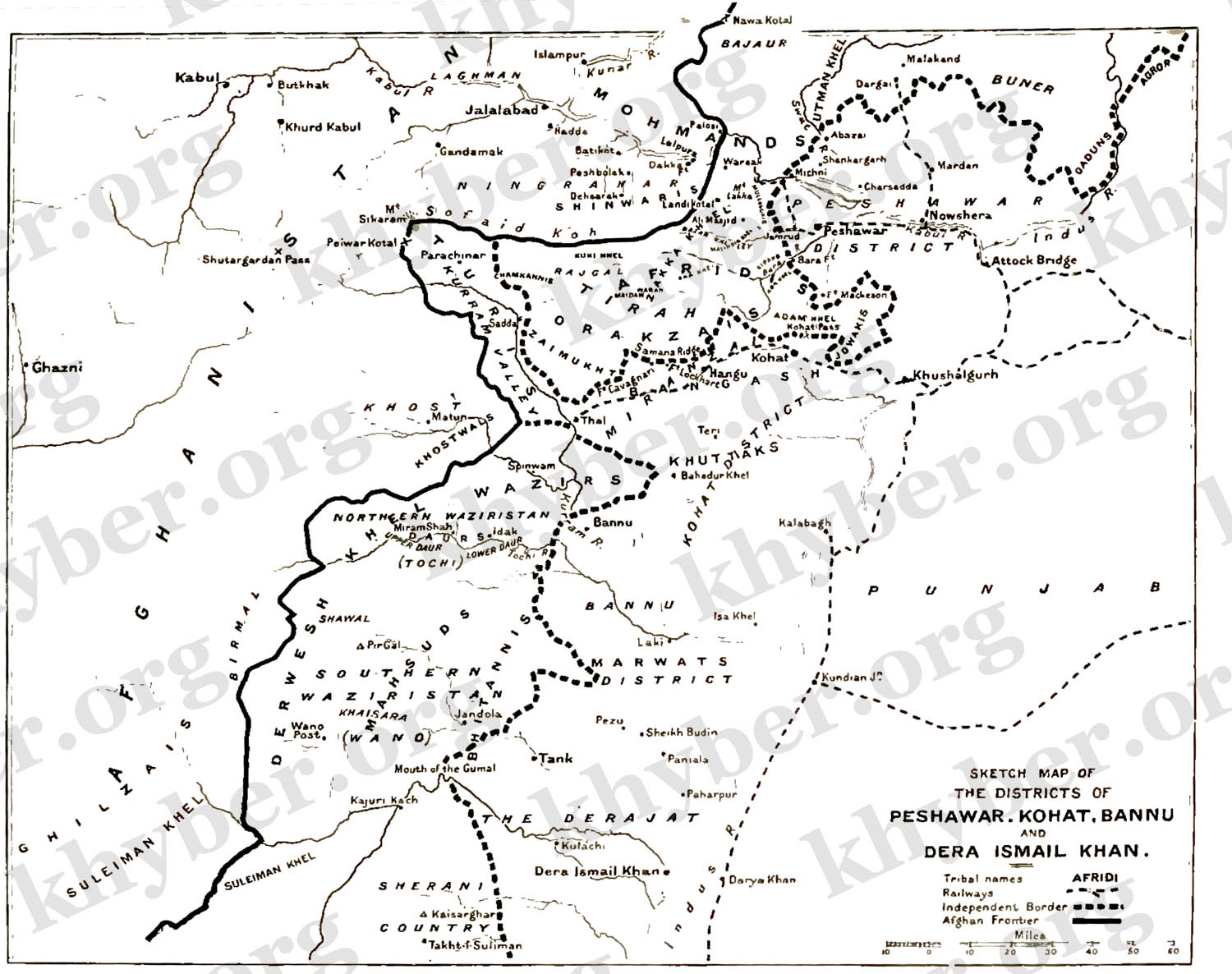

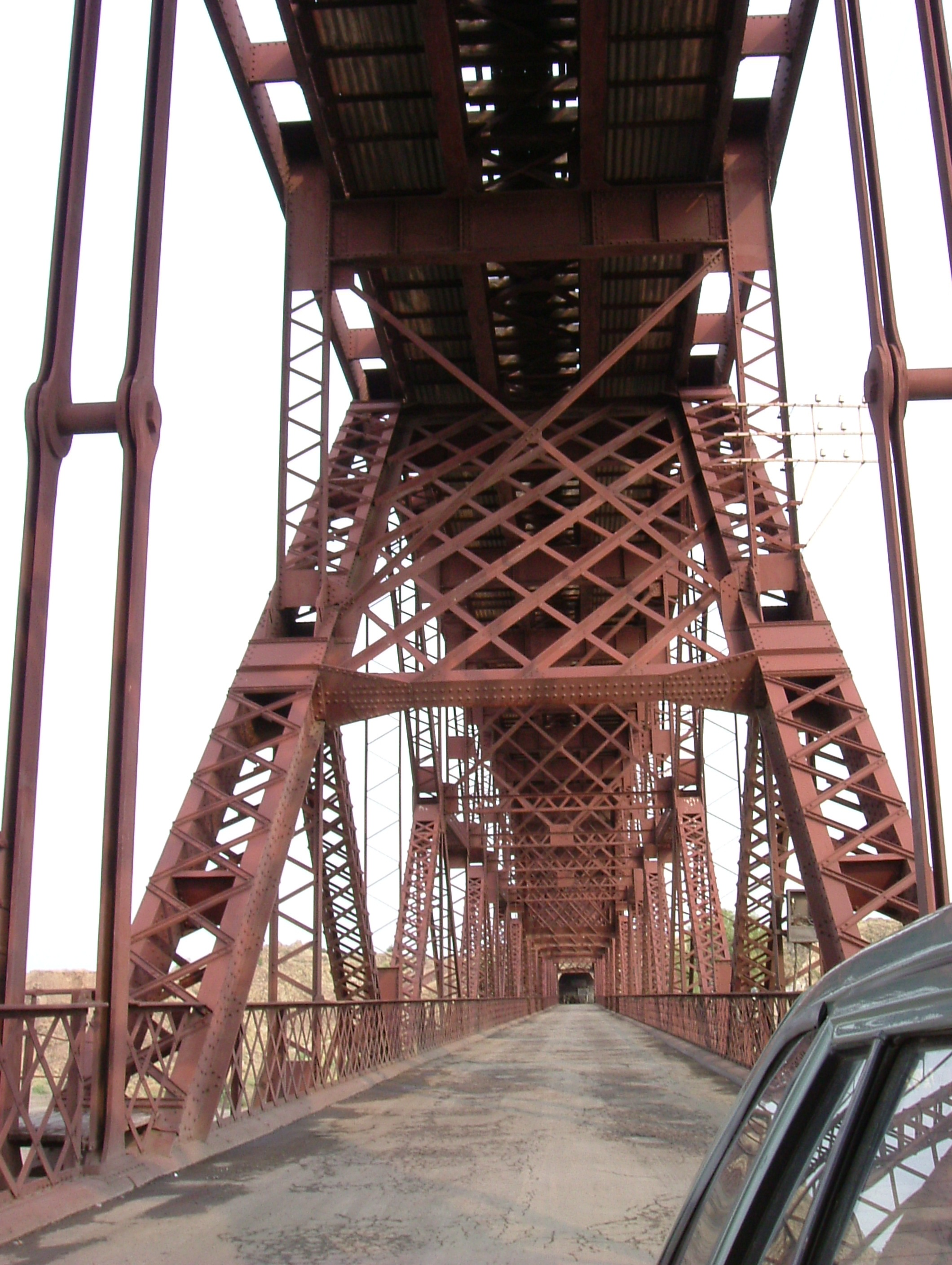

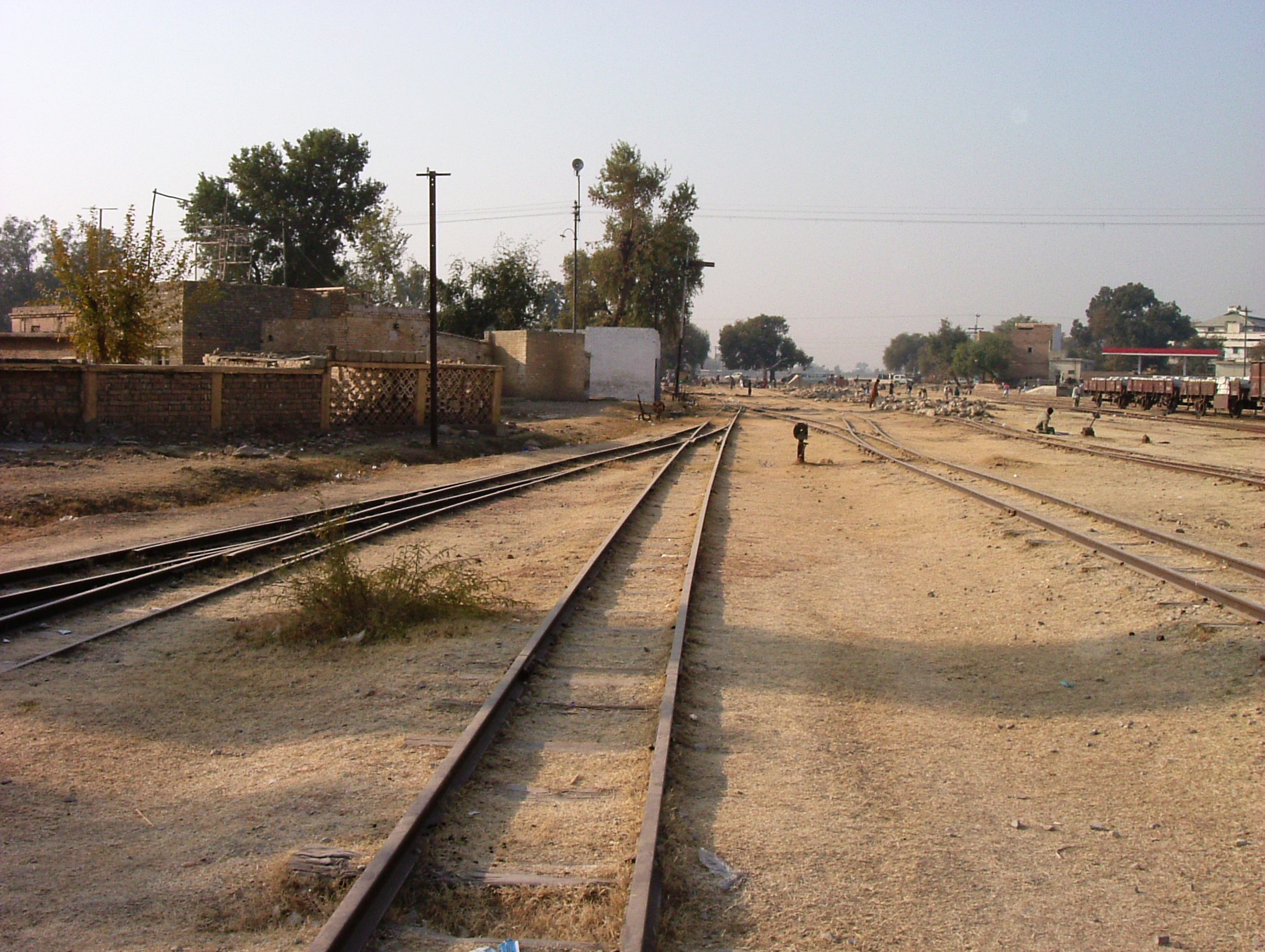

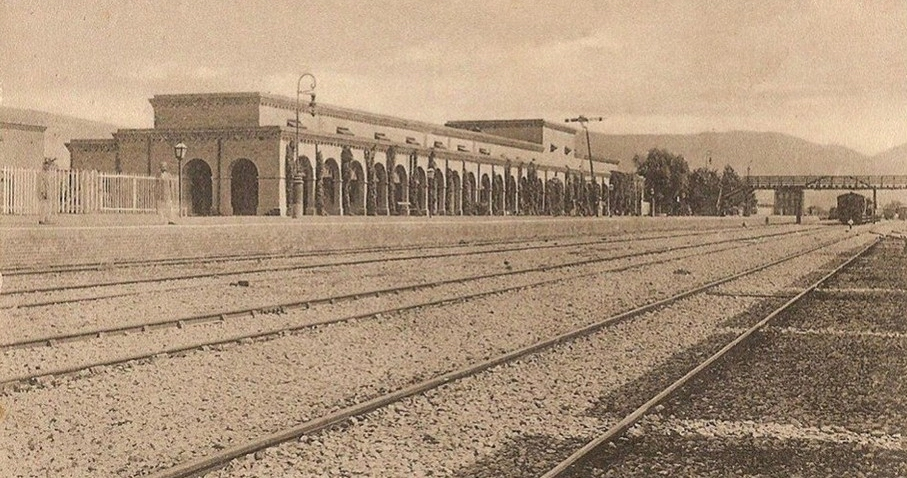

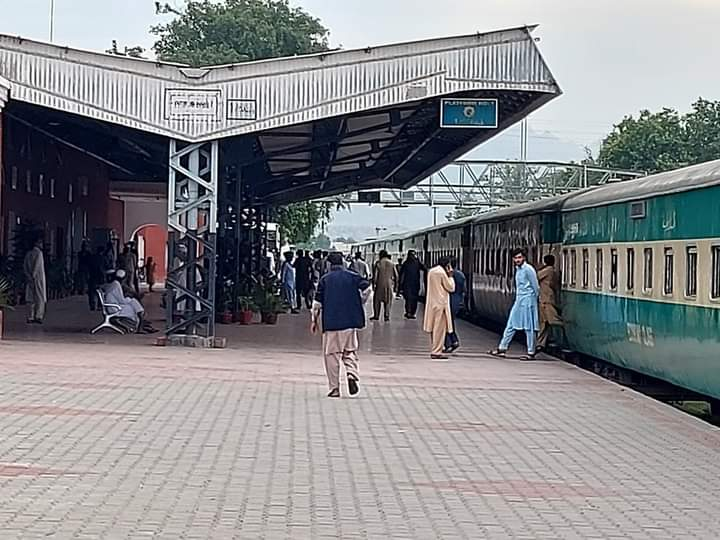

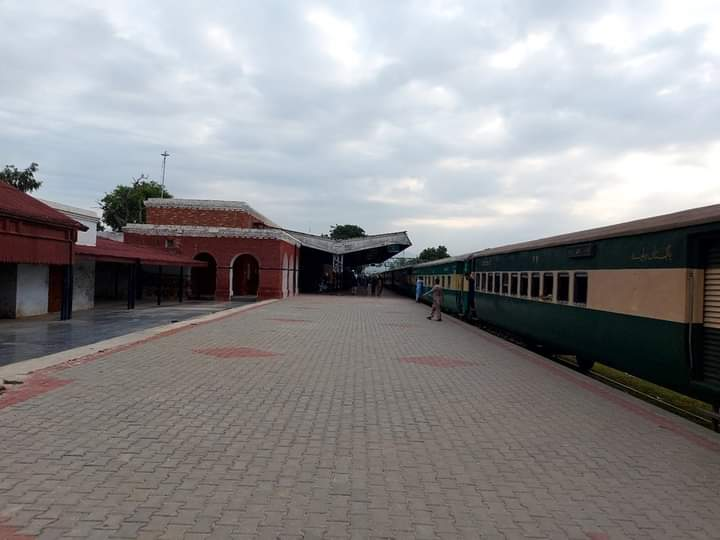

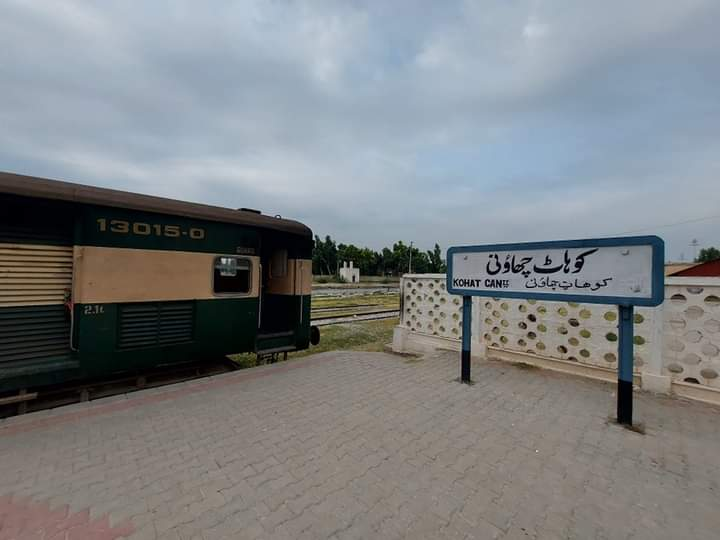

== See also ==
- List of railway stations in Pakistan
- Pakistan Railways
