= BJB =

BJB may refer to:

- BJB College or Buxi Jagabandhu Bidyadhar College, Odisha, India
- BJB Regional Mexicana, former name of XEBJB-AM, a radio station in Monterrey, Nuevo León, Mexico
- Babari Banda railway station, Khyber Pakhtunkhwa, Pakistan, station code 'BJB'
- Barngarla language, ISO 639 code 'bjb'
- Beijing North railway station, China, Pinyin station code 'BJB'
- Bojnord Airport, Iran, IATA code 'BJB'
