= GZI =

GZI may refer to:

- Gazi language
- Ghazni Airport, in Afghanistan
- Ghjrazai railway station, in Pakistan
- Ground Zero Indicator
- Main Directorate of Information of the Polish Army
