= Chauntra railway station =

Railway station in Pakistan

Chauntra Railway Station چونترہ ریلوے اسٹیشن

General information
- Coordinates: 33.5131°N 72.3806°E
- Owner: Ministry of Railways
- Line: Khushalgarh–Kohat–Thal Railway

Other information
- Station code: CTN

History
- Opened: 1881

Services
Preceding station	Pakistan Railways	Following station
Gagan towards Golra Sharif Junction	Khushalgarh–Kohat–Thal Railway	Kahal towards Thal
Location

Chauntra Railway Station (Urdu: چونترہ ریلوے اسٹیشن) is located in Pakistan. No trains stop at this railway station anymore, and it is now a completely closed and non-functional station.

== See also ==
- List of railway stations in Pakistan
- Pakistan Railways
