= HGU =

HGU may refer to:

- Hangu railway station, in Pakistan
- Herguan University, in Sunnyvale, California, United States
- Mount Hagen Airport in Papua New Guinea
- MRC Human Genetics Unit, at the Western General Hospital in Edinburgh, Scotland
- School of Business, Economics and Law (Swedish: Handelshögskolan vid Göteborgs universitet), at the University of Gothenburg
