= Kohat Tehsil railway station =

Railway station in Khyber Pakhtunkhwa, Pakistan

Kohat Tehsil Railway Station
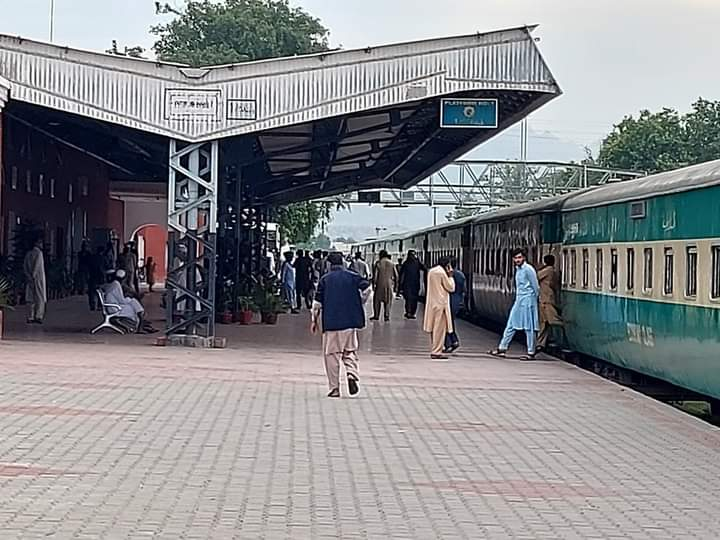

General information
- Coordinates: 33.580267°N 71.430224°E
- Owner: Ministry of Railways
- Line: Jand–Thal Railway

Other information
- Station code: KHTL

Services
Preceding station	Pakistan Railways	Following station
Kohat Cantonment towards Golra Sharif Junction	Khushalgarh–Kohat–Thal Railway	Terminus
Location

Kohat Tehsil Railway Station (Urdu: کوہاٹ تحصیل ریلوے اسٹیشن) is located in Kohat, in Pakistan's Khyber Pakhtunkhwa province. Kohat Express is operated from this station on a daily basis. This train departs Kohat daily at 7 am in summer from 15 April to 15 October, 7:30 am in winter from 15 October to 15 April and returns from Rawalpindi at 3:30 pm daily.

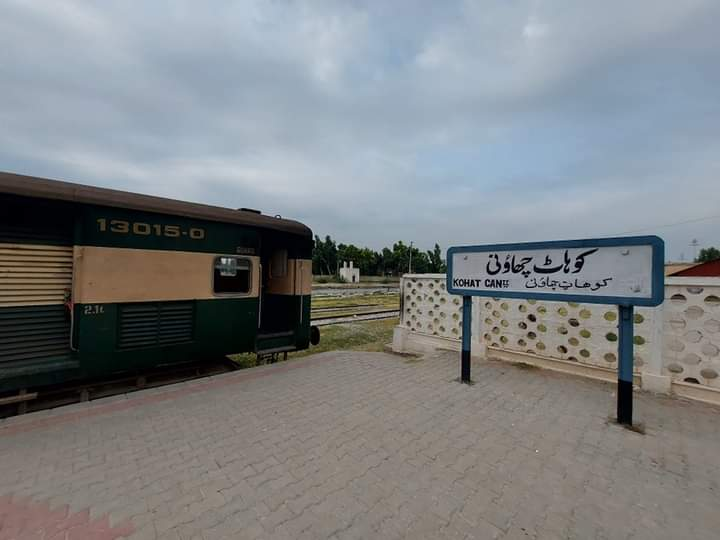
Kohat station sign

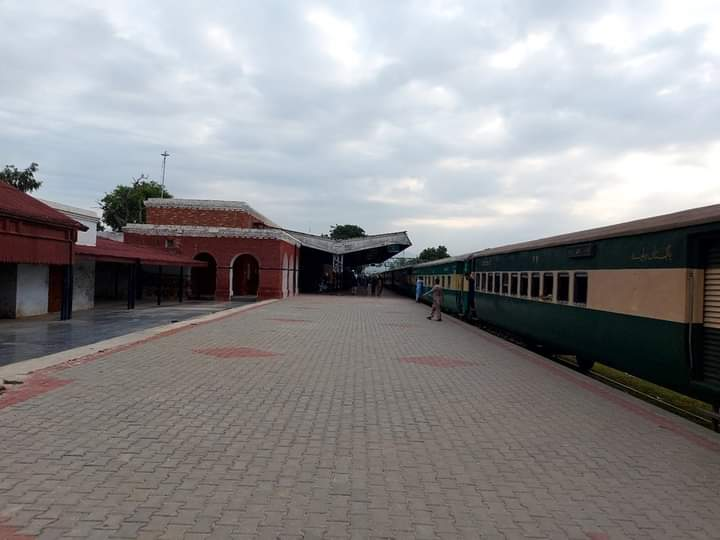
Another view of the station platform

== See also ==
- List of railway stations in Pakistan
- Pakistan Railways
