= KHL (disambiguation) =

The Kontinental Hockey League is an international professional ice hockey league.

KHL may also refer to:

- Kahal railway station, the station code KHL
- Kehai Road station, the station code KHL
- Kampala Hospital, a private healthcare facility in Uganda
- Kemayan Hotels and Leisure, a brand owned by Park Plaza Hotels & Resorts
- khl, the ISO 639-3 code for Lusi language
