= Jand Junction railway station =

Railway station in Pakistan

Jand Junction Railway Station جنڈ جنکشن ریلوے اسٹیشن

General information
- Coordinates: 33.4402°N 72.0113°E
- Owner: Ministry of Railways
- Lines: Kotri–Attock Railway Line; Khushalgarh–Kohat–Thal Railway
- Platforms: 3
- Tracks: 4

Construction
- Parking: yes

Other information
- Station code: JAD

Services
Preceding station	Pakistan Railways	Following station
Uchhri towards Kotri Junction	Kotri–Attock Line	Langar towards Attock City Junction
Langar towards Golra Sharif Junction	Khushalgarh–Kohat–Thal Railway	Khushal Garh towards Thal
Location

Jand Junction Railway Station (Urdu: جنڈ جنکشن ریلوے اسٹیشن) is located in the town of Jand, in Attock district, of Pakistan's Punjab province.

== See also ==
- List of railway stations in Pakistan
- Pakistan Railways
