= Sarkal kassar =

Pakistani village

Coordinates: 33°09′N 72°54′E

Sarkal Kassar (Punjabi and Urdu: سرکال کسر) is a village in Chakwal District, Punjab, Pakistan, with a population of approximately seven thousand. It is situated at coordinates 33°8'52.9"N 72°54'16.8"E, near the northeastern boundary of Chakwal District. The village lies at the intersection of three police jurisdictions: P.S Dhudial in Chakwal and P.S Chauntra and Jatli in Rawalpindi.

== History ==
In 997 CE, Sultan Mahmud Ghaznavi took over the Ghaznavid dynasty empire established by his father, Sultan Sebuktegin, In 1005 he conquered the Shahis in Kabul in 1005, and followed it by the conquests of Punjab region. The Delhi Sultanate and later Mughal Empire ruled the region. The Punjab region became predominantly Muslim due to missionary Sufi saints whose dargahs dot the landscape of Punjab region.

Sarkal Kassar is one of the oldest villages of Chakwal District. It was densely populated with Muslims and minority of Hindus and Sikhs. The predominantly Muslim population supported Muslim League and Pakistan Movement. After the independence of Pakistan in 1947, the minority Hindus and Sikhs migrated to India while the Muslims refugees from India settled down in the Chakwal District.

== Tribes and Clans ==
=== Awans اعوان ===
Awans اعوان comprise above 80% of the population of the village. They are further sub-divided into four clans, i.e.:

- Jhallay جھلے,
- Dhingal دھنگال,
- Dhoray ڈھورے, and
- Malkal ملکال sub-clans.

Other important tribes are:

- Kassar ،جٹ,
- Chanr چہان,
- Bairay بیرے,
- Sowain وائیں,
- Khurnay کھرنے,
- Miyal میال,
- Bhatti بھٹی
- Jogi جوگی,
- Rupar روپڑ,
- Jaaray جاڑے,
- Siralye کرھن
- Shhaal شھال
- Malyaar ملیار.
- Supporting Casts غیر کاشتکار قومیں
