= Nasrat Khel railway station =

Railway station in Pakistan

Nasrat Khel Railway Station

General information
- Owner: Ministry of Railways
- Line: Jand–Thal Railway

Other information
- Station code: NSX
Location

Nasrat Khel Railway Station (Urdu: نصرت خیل ریلوے اسٹیشن) is located in Pakistan.

The station was on the narrow-gauge Kohat-Thall railway route, which was abandoned in 1991 after serving the towns between Kohat and Thall.

== See also ==
- List of railway stations in Pakistan
- Pakistan Railways
