= Babari Banda railway station =

Railway station in Pakistan

Babari Banda Railway Station بابری بانڈہ ریلوے اسٹیشن

General information
- Coordinates: 33.5294°N 71.5756°E
- Owner: Ministry of Railways
- Line: Jand–Thal Railway

Other information
- Station code: BJB

Services
| Preceding station | Pakistan Railways | Following station |
|---|---|---|
| Seni Gambat towards Golra Sharif Junction | Khushalgarh–Kohat–Thal Railway | Cadet College Kohat towards Thal |
Location

Babari Banda Railway Station (Urdu: بابری بانڈہ ریلوے اسٹیشن) is a railway station in northwest Pakistan. It is located in Landi Kotal in the Khyber Pakhtunkhwa province.

== See also ==
- List of railway stations in Pakistan
- Pakistan Railways
