= Chikarkot railway station =

Railway station in Pakistan

Coordinates: 33.599309°N 71.297513°E

Chikarkot Railway Station

General information
- Owner: Ministry of Railways
- Line: Khushalgarh–Kohat–Thal Railway

Other information
- Station code: CKO
Location

Chikarkot Railway Station (Urdu: چیکرکوٹ ریلوے اسٹیشن) is located in Pakistan.

== See also ==
- List of railway stations in Pakistan
- Pakistan Railways
