= Kahi, Hangu District =

Coordinates: 33°28′28″N 70°51′37″E

کاہی Kahi Mandrakhail مندراخیل
- Village and union council
- Interactive map of کاہی Kahi
- Country: Pakistan
- Region: Khyber Pakhtunkhwa
- District: Hangu District
- Time zone: UTC+5 (PST)

Kahi is a village and union council in the Hangu District of Khyber Pakhtunkhwa. It is located at 33°28'28N 70°51'37E and has an altitude of 982 metres (3225 feet).

== See also ==
- Kahi railway station
