= Doaba railway station =

Railway station in Pakistan

Coordinates: 33.428343°N 70.742093°E

Doaba Railway Station

General information
- Owner: Ministry of Railways
- Line: Jand–Thal Railway

Other information
- Station code: DOV
Location

Doaba Railway Station (Urdu: دوآبہ ریلوے اسٹیشن) is located in Pakistan at Railway Road, Nawanshahr, District Shaheed Bhagat Singh Nagar - 114514 in the state of Punjab.

== See also ==
- List of railway stations in Pakistan
- Pakistan Railways
