= Ibrahimzai railway station =

Former railway station in Khyber Pakhtunkhwa, Pakistan

Ibrahimzai Railway Station

General information
- Owner: Ministry of Railways
- Line: Jand–Thal Railway

Other information
- Station code: IMZ
Location

Ibrahimzai Railway Station (Urdu: ابراہیم زئی ریلوے اسٹیشن) is located in Pakistan.

== See also ==
- List of railway stations in Pakistan
- Pakistan Railways
