= Ustarzai railway station =

Railway station in Pakistan

Coordinates: 33°36′N 71°14′E

Ustarzai Railway Station

General information
- Owner: Ministry of Railways
- Line: Jand–Thal Railway

Other information
- Station code: UTZ
Location

Ustarzai Railway Station (Urdu: استرزئی ریلوے اسٹیشن) is an abandoned railway station located in Usterzai, Kohat District, Khyber Pakhtunkhwa, Pakistan.

== See also ==
- List of railway stations in Pakistan
- Pakistan Railways
