= Togh railway station =

Railway station in Pakistan

Togh Railway Station

General information
- Owner: Ministry of Railways
- Line: Jand–Thal Railway

Other information
- Station code: TOG

History
- Former names: Great Indian Peninsula Railway
Location

Togh Railway Station (Urdu: ٹوگ ریلوے اسٹیشن) is located in Pakistan.

== See also ==
- List of railway stations in Pakistan
- Pakistan Railways
