= Kahal railway station =

Railway station in Pakistan

Kahal Railway Station کاہل ریلوے اسٹیشن
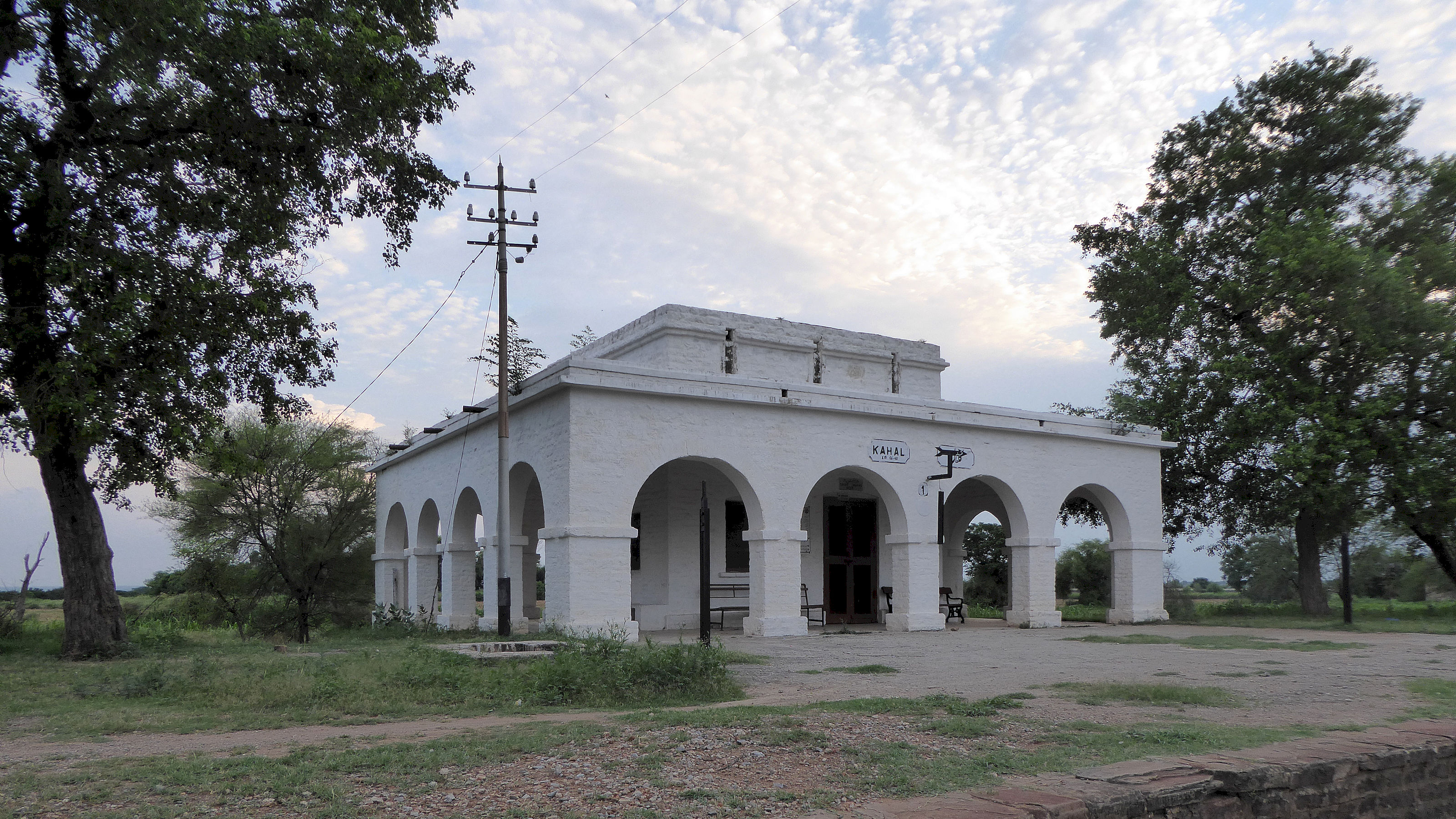
- Kahal railway station

General information
- Coordinates: 33.5368°N 72.3233°E
- Owner: Ministry of Railways
- Line: Golra Sharif–Basal Branch line
- Platforms: 1
- Tracks: 2

Other information
- Station code: KHL

Services
Preceding station	Pakistan Railways	Following station
Chauntra towards Golra Sharif Junction	Khushalgarh–Kohat–Thal Railway	Basal Sharif towards Thal
Location

Kahal Railway Station (Urdu: کاہل ریلوے اسٹیشن) is located in Pakistan.

== See also ==
- List of railway stations in Pakistan
- Pakistan Railways

== Gallery ==
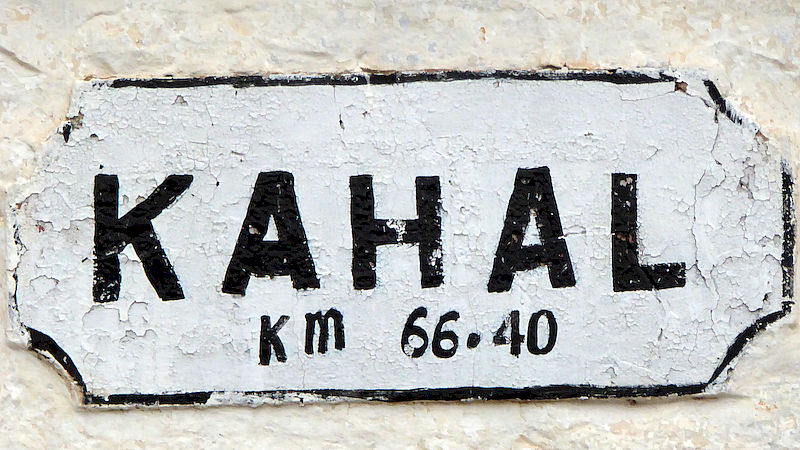
Railway station tag
