= Raisan railway station =

Railway station in Pakistan

Raisan Railway Station

General information
- Owner: Ministry of Railways
- Line: Jand–Thal Railway

Other information
- Station code: RSN
- Website: https://www.pakrail.gov.pk/index.aspx
Location

Raisan Railway Station (Urdu: ریسان ریلوے اسٹیشن) is a railway station located in Hangu District, Pakistan.

== See also ==
- List of railway stations in Pakistan
- Pakistan Railways
