= Darsmand railway station =

Former railway station in Khyber Pakhtunkhwa, Pakistan

Darsmand Railway Station

General information
- Owner: Ministry of Railways
- Line: Jand–Thal Railway

Other information
- Station code: DSV
Location

Darsmand Railway Station (Urdu: درسماند ریلوے اسٹیشن) is located in Pakistan.

== See also ==
- List of railway stations in Pakistan
- Pakistan Railways
