= Kahi, Nowshera district =

Kahi is a village in the Nowshera district, in Khyber Pakhtunkhwa, Pakistan.

== Economy ==
The village has a large cement plant. Education is provided via govt schools and some private schools such as Little Scholars Academy ( This school has once Topped Mardan Board), Suffah Children Academy, Alfalah public School and some others. There is also a boys degree college at Khan Kohi which was brought to Alaka Khwarah by the hardships of Haji Multan Zareen when he was a Chairman at his time. And there is also a girls degree college at Kahi which is one of the major achievement of Baseer Ahmad Khattak. There is no such Basic health services provided by the government except a BHU which was upgraded to RHC by Major Baseer Ahmad Khattak (Retired) the then Member of Provincial Assembly, but although the PTI government has failed to complete the project and yet it has to be completed. (https://www.google.com/maps/place/Ahmed+Brothers+Medical+Store+%26+Healthcare+Center+Kahi/@33.8173907,72.0850936,165m/data=!3m2!1e3!4b1!4m5!3m4!1s0x38df29c701871335:0xe4129cf93b9938ab!8m2!3d33.8173896!4d72.0856408).

== Politics ==
Baseer Ahmad Khattak a retired Army officer ( Major) was the first and only elected member, belonging to the Alaka Khwarah of the Khyber Pakhtunkhwa Assembly and lives in the village.
