= Hangu railway station =

Former railway station in Khyber Pakhtunkhwa, Pakistan

Coordinates: 33.5267°N 71.0657°E

Hangu Railway Station
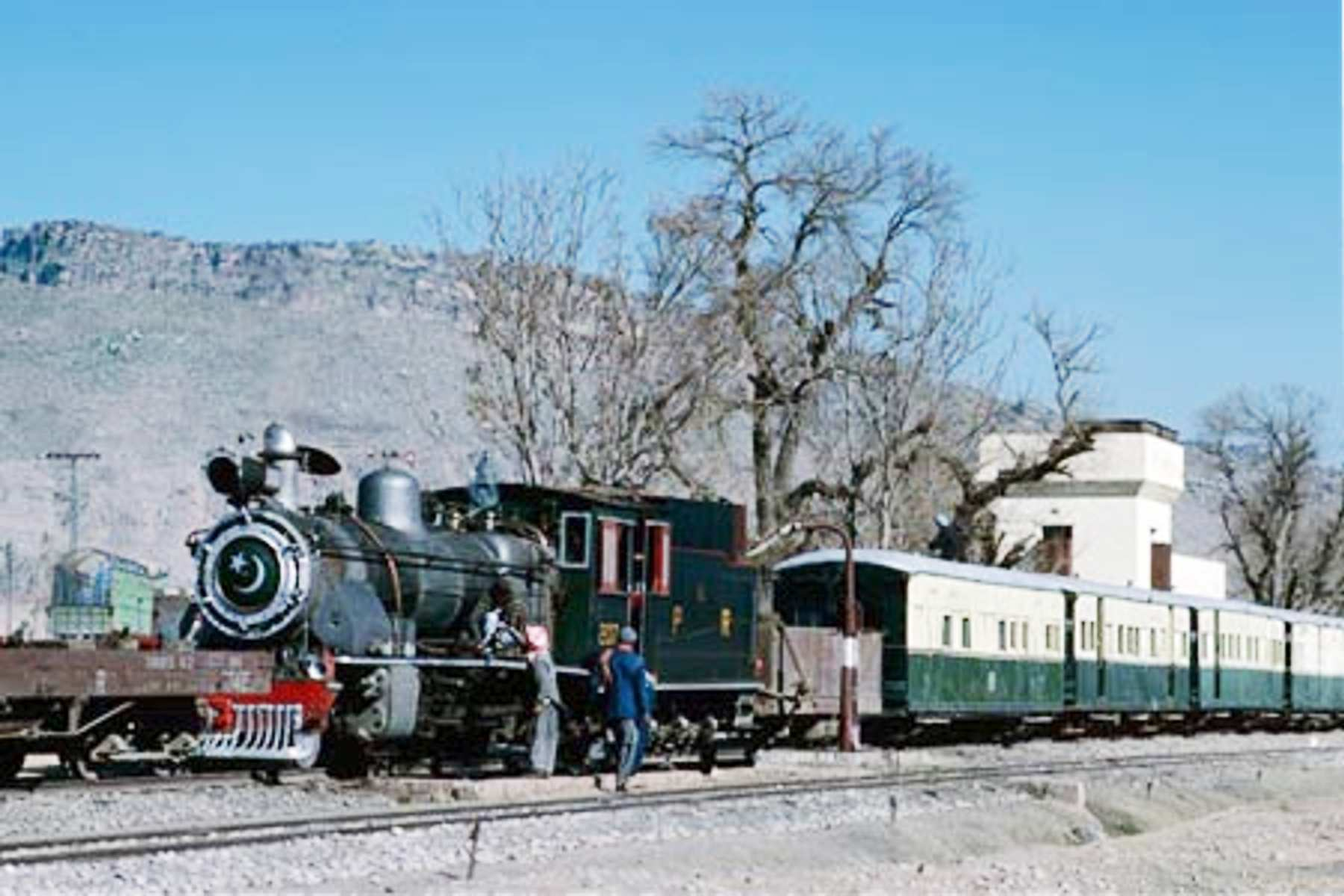
- Train Hangu in 1963

General information
- Owner: Ministry of Railways
- Line: Jand–Thal Railway

Other information
- Station code: HGU
Location

Hangu Railway Station (Urdu: ہنگو ریلوے اسٹیشن) is an abandoned railway station located in Hangu District, Pakistan.

== See also ==
- List of railway stations in Pakistan
- Pakistan Railways
