= Khyber Afghan Airlines =

Airline in Afghanistan

IATA	ICAO	Call sign
-	KHY	KHYBER
- Ceased operations: 2018
- Hubs: Jalalabad Airport
- Headquarters: Jalalabad, Afghanistan

Khyber Afghan Airlines was a private cargo airline based in Jalalabad, Afghanistan, with its base at Jalalabad Airport. As of September 2018, it had suspended all operations with general plans to restart them.
