= Kahi, Iran =

Kahi كاهي
- Village
- Location within Iran
- Coordinates: 32°38′05″N 59°27′47″E
- Country: Iran
- Province: South Khorasan
- County: Sarbisheh
- Bakhsh: Mud
- Rural District: Mud

Population (2006)
  - Total: 58
- Time zone: UTC+3:30 (IRST)
  - Summer (DST): UTC+4:30 (IRDT)

Kahi (Persian: كاهي, romanized: Kāhī) is a village in Mud Rural District, Mud District, Sarbisheh County, South Khorasan Province, Iran. At the 2006 census, its population was 58, in 27 families.
