= Chauntra Assembly constituency =

Constituency of the Himachal Pradesh legislative assembly in India

Coordinates: 32.01°N 76.75°E

Chauntra
- Former constituency for the Himachal Pradesh Legislative Assembly

Constituency details
- Country: India
- Region: North India
- State: Himachal Pradesh
- District: Mandi
- Established: 1972
- Abolished: 1972
- Total electors: 23,298

Chauntra Assembly constituency was an assembly constituency in the India state of Himachal Pradesh.

== Members of the Legislative Assembly ==
Election	Member	Party
1972	Ram Singh	Independent politician

== Election results ==
=== Assembly Election 1972 ===
1972 Himachal Pradesh Legislative Assembly election: Chauntra
Party	Candidate	Votes	%	±%
Independent	Ram Singh	6,494	75.70%	New
Independent	Dharam Chand	1,108	12.92%	New
INC	Gopi Ram	610	7.11%	New
LRP	Puran Chand	367	4.28%	New
Margin of victory		5,386	62.78%	
Turnout		8,579	38.41%	
Registered electors		23,298		
Independent win (new seat)				
