= Chauntra, Punjab =

Chauntra
- village
- Location in Punjab, India Chauntra (India)
- Coordinates: 30.5255°N 74.5831°E
- Country: India
- State: Punjab
- District: Sri Muktsar Sahib

Population (2001)
  - Total: 1,099

Languages
  - Official: Punjabi
- Time zone: UTC+5:30 (IST)
- Nearest city: Sri Muktsar Sahib
- Sex ratio: 1000/904 ♂/♀

Chauntra is a small village in the Sri Muktsar Sahib district of Punjab, India. The villagers belongs to the Buttar clan of Jatts.

== Geography ==
The coordinates 30°31′32″N 74°34′59″E are the centre of the village, located in the Sri Muktsar Sahib district in the Indian state of Punjab.

== Demographics ==
In 2001, according to the census, the village had a total population of 1,099 with 190 households, 577 males and 522 females. Thus males constitute 52.5% and females 47.5% of total population with the sex ratio of 904 females per thousand males.

=== Religion & Language ===
The villagers are Sikhs and follows Sikhism with Hindu minorities. Punjabi is the official and local language of the village.

== Economy ==
Being the rural area of Punjab agriculture is the main occupation of the locals and the main source of income.
