= Ghurzai railway station =

Railway station in Pakistan

Ghurazai railway station

General information
- Owner: Ministry of Railways

Other information
- Station code: GZI

Ghurazai railway station (Urdu: غرزئی ریلوے اسٹیشن) is located on Jand-Kohat branch line in Pakistan.

== See also ==
- List of railway stations in Pakistan
- Pakistan Railways
