= Kahi railway station =

Railway station in Pakistan

General information
- Owner: Ministry of Railways

Other information
- Status: Closed
- Station code: KHY

History
- Former names: Great Indian Peninsula Railway
Location

Kahi railway station (Urdu: کاہی ریلوے اسٹیشن) is located in Kahi, Khyber Pakhtunkhwa, Pakistan.

== See also ==
- List of railway stations in Pakistan
- Pakistan Railways
