= Jand–Thal Branch Line =

Railway line in Pakistan

Kohat–Thal Branch Line کوہاٹ–تھل برانچ لائن

Overview
- Owner: Pakistan Railways
- Termini: Jand Junction; Thal
- Stations: 4

Service
- Operator: Pakistan Railways

History
- Opened: 1 May 1902

Technical
- Line length: 160 km (99 mi)
- Track gauge: 1,676 mm (5 ft 6 in); 762 mm (2 ft 6 in)
- Operating speed: 40 km/h (25 mph)

The Jand–Thal Branch Line (Urdu: کوہاٹ–تھل برانچ لائن) is one of several railway lines in Pakistan, operated and maintained by Pakistan Railways. The line originally began from Jand Junction railway station to Kohat Cantonment station and onward to Thal station. However, the line now ends at Kohat Cantonment station. The total length of this railway line is 160 kilometers (99 mi) to Thal railway station and 61 kilometers (38 mi) to Kohat Cantonment railway station. There are 18 railway stations from Jand Junction to Thal and 4 railway stations from Jand Junction to Kohat. In 1991, the Kohat-Thal section was abandoned by Pakistan Railways because it was narrow gauge.

== History ==
The original line was a mixed gauge strategic military railway built in 1902 by the North Western State Railway. The Khushalgarh–Kohat section consisted of 1,676 mm (5 ft 6 in) broad gauge track while the Kohat–Thall section consisted of 762 mm (2 ft 6 in) narrow gauge track. Khushalgarh had been connected in 1881 by a short 11 kilometers (6.8 mi) broad gauge spur line to Jand Junction on the North Western State Railway mainline (now called the Kotri–Attock Railway Line). In April 1889, the Khushalgarh–Kohat section was first surveyed as a broad gauge line and in March 1901, a decision was made that no bridge would be built over the Indus River at Khushalgarh. Instead a ropeway would be built over the river and as a consequence, the broad gauge line idea was abandoned in favour of a 762mm narrow gauge line. The line was constructed from the right bank of the Indus facing Khushalgarh to Kohat, a distance of about 48 kilometers (30 mi) and opened in May 1902. The Kohat-Thal extension of 100 kilometers (62 mi) from Kohat through the Kohat Pass up the Miranzai Valley to Thall was opened in stages from March 1901 and reached Thall in April 1903. In 1903, an accident closed the ropeway over the Indus river and a boat bridge replaced it. Eventually the decision was made to construct the Khushal Garh Bridge crossing the Indus river and at the same time converting the Khushalgarh–Kohat section from narrow gauge to broad gauge. This section was reopened in 1908. In 1947, the railway line was transferred to Pakistan Western Railways. In June 1991, the Kohat–Thal section was abandoned. In 2017, proposals were made to rebuild the Kohat–Thal section and upgrade the Khushalgarh–Kohat section.

== Stations ==
Broad gauge section

- Jand Junction
- Khushal Garh (Abandoned)
- Faqir Hussain Shaheed
- Tilkan (Abandoned)
- Ghurazai (Abandoned)
- Seni Gambat (Abandoned)
- Babari Banda
- Cadet College Kohat (Abandoned)
- Kohat Cantonment

Narrow gauge section/Abandoned section

- Kohat Tehsil
- Nasrat Khel
- Chikarkot
- Ustarzai
- Raisan
- Ibrahimzai
- Hangu
- Togh
- Kahi
- Doaba
- Darsmand
- Thal

== See also ==
- Pakistan Railways
