= Golra Sharif Junction railway station =

Railway station in Pakistan

Golra Sharif Junction Station گولڑہ شریف جنکشن اسٹیشن
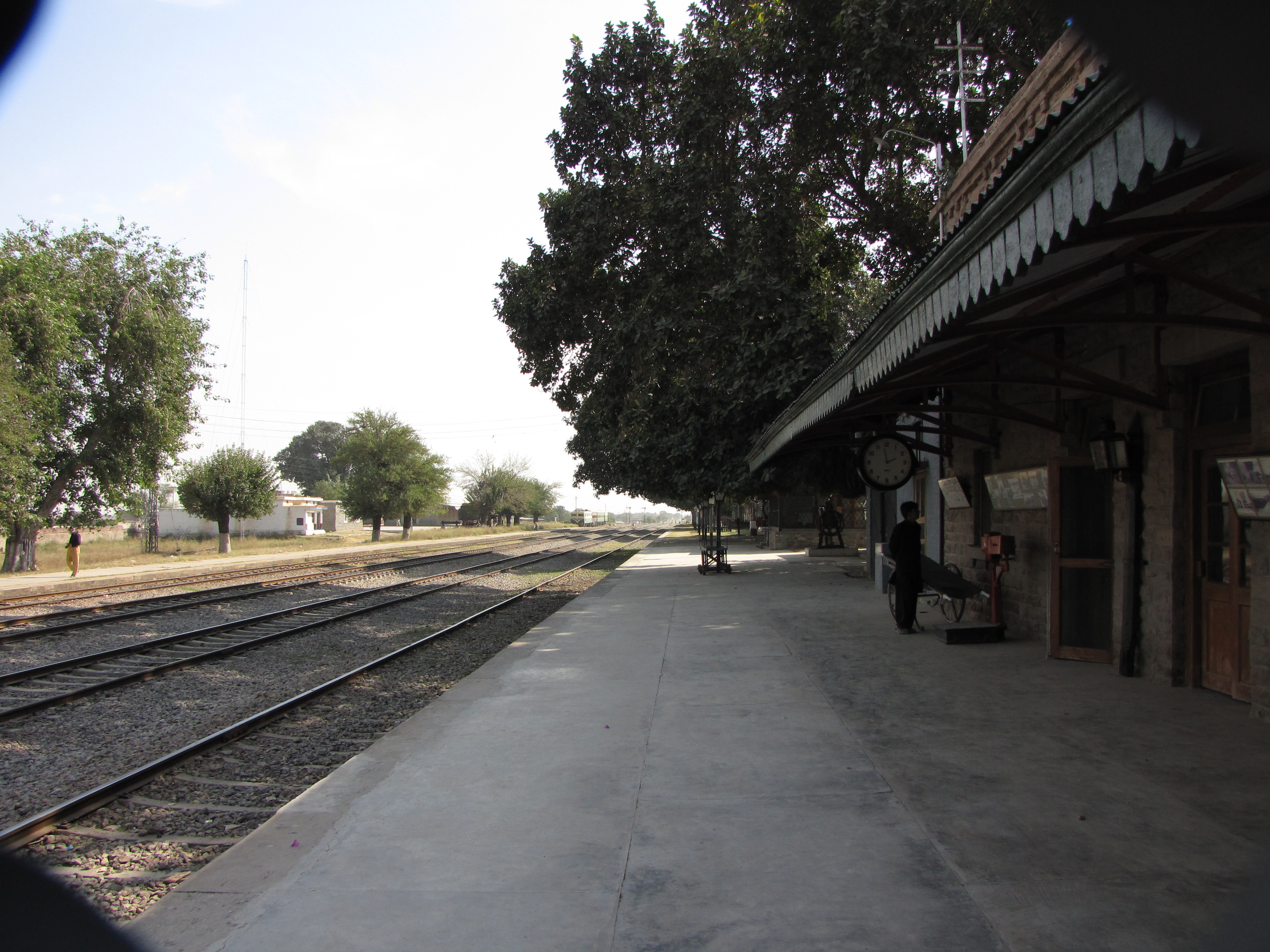
- Golra Sharif Junction Station

General information
- Location: Golra Road, Islamabad 44000; Pakistan: 1,527 km (949 mi) from Kiamari; 160 km (99 mi) from Peshawar Cantt
- Coordinates: 33.6706°N 72.9477°E
- Elevation: 1,994 ft (608 m) above MSL
- Owner: Ministry of Railways
- Lines: Karachi–Peshawar Railway Line; Khushalgarh–Kohat–Thal Railway
- Tracks: 8

Construction
- Parking: 8

Other information
- Station code: GLRS / GOL

History
- Opened: 1881; 145 years ago
- Former names: Great Indian Peninsula Railway

Services
Preceding station	Pakistan Railways	Following station
Madina-Tul-Hijjaj towards Kiamari	Karachi–Peshawar Line	Sangjani towards Peshawar Cantonment
Terminus	Khushalgarh–Kohat–Thal Railway	Tarnol towards Thal
Location
- Location within Pakistan

Golra Sharif Junction Railway Station (Urdu and Punjabi: گولڑہ شریف جنکشن ریلوے اسٹیشن) is located on Golra road in Islamabad, Pakistan. It is part of Pakistan Railways. The Golra Sharif Railway Museum is located at this station.

The station lies on the main line of the Pakistan Railways, which connects the rest of the country in the south and Peshawar in the north. More than 20 trains pass through this station every day. It is situated southwest of Islamabad, the capital of Pakistan, at the altitude of 1994 feet. The building has Victorian architecture and comprises five hall-like rooms constructed in yellow stone masonry. The station originally linked Peshawar, Kohat, Havelian, and Multan. It now enjoys more importance due to the presence of its museum.

== History ==
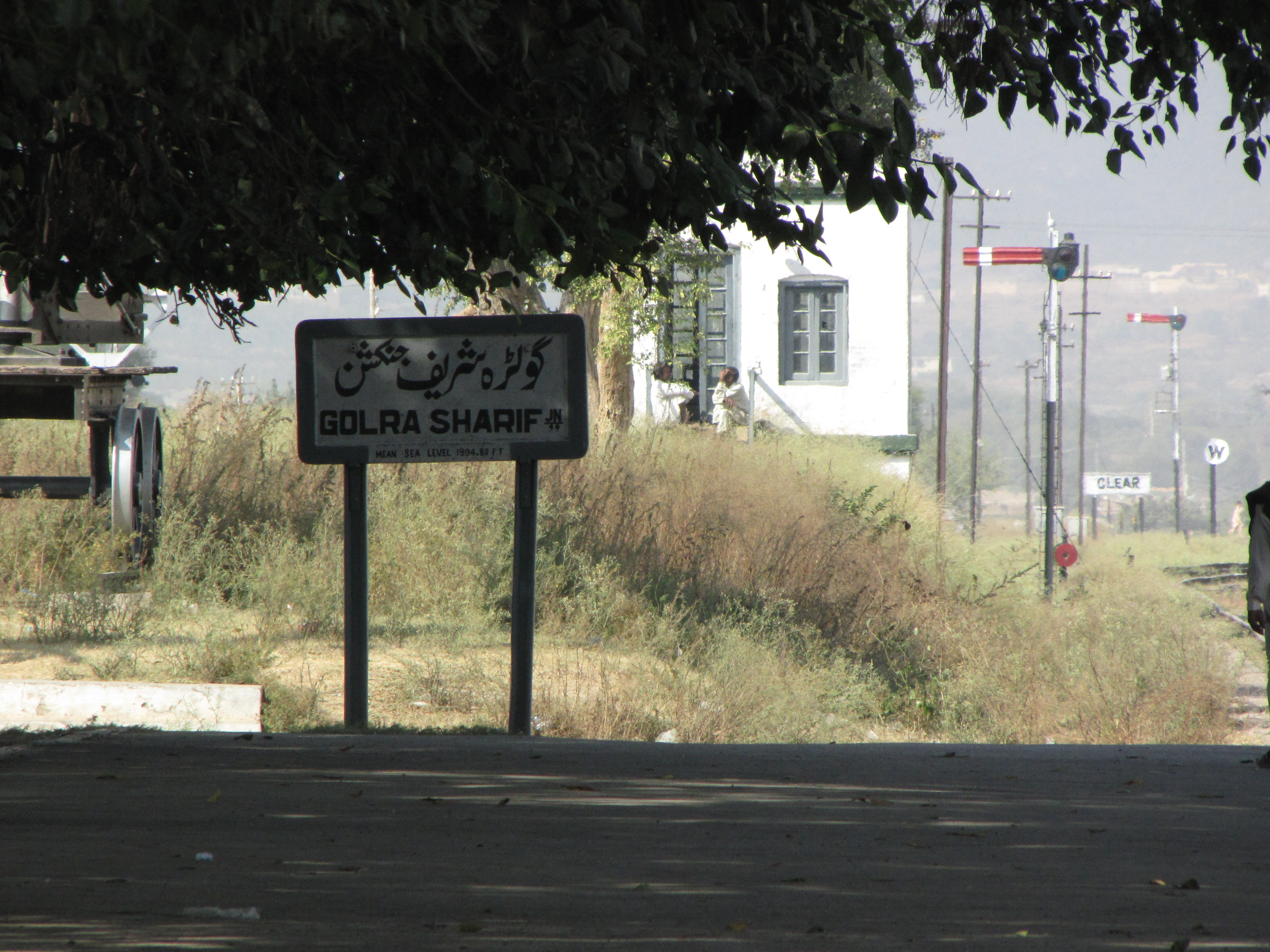
Golra Railway Station in 2009

The station was established in 1882 and upgraded to a railroad junction in 1912. It was part of the British logistics artery during the Afghan military campaigns at the turn of the twentieth century. It has since become part of an important trade route which runs into Afghanistan through the Khyber Pass.

== See also ==
- List of railway lines in Pakistan
- List of railway stations in Pakistan
