= Thal railway station =

Railway station in Pakistan

Thall Railway Station

General information
- Owner: Ministry of Railways
- Line: Jand–Thal Railway

Other information
- Station code: THAL
Location

Thal Railway Station (Urdu: تھل ریلوے اسٹیشن) was a railway station located in Hangu District of Khyber Pakhtunkhwa province in Pakistan. The station served the town of Thall until it closed in 1991.

Turrets and water tanks are the main features of its architecture.

== See also ==
- List of railway stations in Pakistan
- Pakistan Railways
