= Noor Hossain (disambiguation) =

Noor Hossain (1961–1987) was a Bangladeshi activist killed during a political protest.

Noor Hossain may also refer to:

- Noor Hossain (cricketer), Bangladeshi cricketer
- Noor Hossain Day, a holiday celebrated November 10 in Bangladesh
- Nur Hossain Kasemi, (1945 — 2020) was a Bangladeshi Deobandi Islamic Scholar and Secretary General of Hefazat-e-Islam Bangladesh
- Noor Hussain, Bangladeshi lawyer and politician

== See also ==
- Noor Hussain Al-Malki, Qatari sprinter
- Hossain, a name
- Noor (disambiguation)
- Nur (disambiguation)
- Nur Hossain, a fictional character in The Black Coat
