= Nur, Iran (disambiguation) =

Nur, Iran is a city in Mazandaran Province.

Nur (Persian: نور) in Iran may also refer to:

- Nur-e Olya, a village in Kermanshah Province
- Nur-e Sofla, a village in Kermanshah Province
- Nur, Semnan, a village
- Nur County in Mazandaran Province
