= Nur =

Nur or NUR may refer to:

== In Islam ==
- An-Nur, one of the names of God in Islam, meaning "The Light".
- An-Nur (The Light), the 24th chapter of the Qur'an
- Nūr (Islam), a concept, literally meaning "light"
- Risale-i Nur Collection, a collection of works by Islamic scholar Said Nursî

== People ==
- Nur (name)

== Places ==
- National University of Rwanda
- Nur, Iran (disambiguation), several places in Iran
- Nur, Poland
- Nur Mountains "Mountains of Holy Light", a mountain range in Turkey
- NUR Reactor, a research reactor in Algiers
- Nur University (Bolivia)

== Other uses ==
- National Union of Railwaymen, a trade union in the United Kingdom
- Nur, a moon in the video game Star Wars Jedi: Fallen Order
- Nur (biology), a family of transcription factors
- Nur railway station a railway station in Pakistan
- Nur (Rawalpindi) railway station a railway station in Pakistan
- Nur (TV series), a Malaysian television series

== See also ==
- Noor (disambiguation)
- Nuristan Province, Afghanistan
