= Noor =

Noor or Nour may refer to:

== Arts and media ==
- Noor (2017 film), a Bollywood film
- Noor (2025 film), a Bangladeshi romantic film
- Noor (novel), a 2021 Africanfuturist novel by Nnedi Okorafor
- Noor (play), a 2009 play by Akbar Ahmed
- Noor, an album by the metal band Adorned Brood
- Noor, the Arabic title for Turkish soap opera Gümüş and a character in the series
- Noor, a 2020 Pakistani television series with Usama Khan
- Nour (Thai TV series), a 2026 Thai boys' love crime fantasy television series

== People ==
- Noor (name)
- Queen Noor of Jordan

== Places ==
- Noor (Meuse), a river in the Netherlands and Belgium
- Noor, Iran, a city in northern Iran and capital of the Noor county
- Noor County, a county in Mazandaran Province in Iran
- Noor Palace, Sweden

== Power plants ==
- Noor Abu Dhabi, a solar power plant in Abu Dhabi, UAE
- Noor Energy 1, phase 4 of the Mohammed bin Rashid Al Maktoum Solar Park near Dubai, UAE
- Noor Jenin PV Solar Plant, a solar plant in Kafr Dan in the West Bank, Israel
- Ouarzazate solar power station, also known as Noor Power Station, a concentrated solar power station in Ouarzazate, Morocco

== Other uses ==
- Noor (horse), an Irish-bred Thoroughbred racehorse
- Noor (Minecraft), one of the nine protagonists of the game Minecraft
- Noor (missile), an Iranian anti-ship missile
- Noor (satellite), a series of satellites; included the first Iranian military satellite
- NOOR photo agency, a documentary photography collective and foundation
- Nour: Play with Your Food, a video game

== See also ==
- An-Nur (The Light), the 24th sura of the Qur'an
- Nour (actress) (born 1977), Lebanese actress
- Nur (disambiguation)
- Nūr (Islam), a concept in Islam
