= Kafr Dan =

- Municipality type C

Arabic transcription(s)
  - Arabic: كفر دان
  - Latin (official): Kufr Dan
- Location of Kafr Dan within Palestine
- Coordinates: 32°28′43″N 35°15′15″E
- Palestine grid: 174/209
- State: State of Palestine
- Governorate: Jenin

Government
  - Type: Municipality

Population (2017)
  - Total: 6,591
- Name meaning: "the village of adhan (call to prayer)"

Kafr Dan (Arabic: كفر ذان) is a Palestinian village in the Jenin Governorate, located 8 km northwest of Jenin in the northern West Bank. According to the Palestinian Central Bureau of Statistics (PCBS) census, the town had a population of 5,148 in 2007 and 6,591 in 2017.

== Location ==
Kafr Dan is located north-west of Jenin; just east of Al-Yamun and north of Burqin.

== History ==
Pottery remains from the Roman, Byzantine, Early Islamic periods and the Middle Ages have been found here.

Palmer suggested to identify Kafr Dan with Capher Outheni (Hebrew: כפר עותני), a village mentioned in the Talmud.

=== Ottoman era ===
Kafr Dan, like the rest of Palestine, was incorporated into the Ottoman Empire in 1517. During the 16th and 17th centuries, it belonged to the Turabay Emirate (1517-1683), which encompassed also the Jezreel Valley, Haifa, Jenin, Beit She'an Valley, northern Jabal Nablus, Bilad al-Ruha/Ramot Menashe, and the northern part of the Sharon plain.

In the census of 1596, Kafr Dan appeared as "Kafradan”, located in the nahiya of Sha'ara in the liwa of Lajjun. It had a population of 9 households, all Muslim. They paid a fixed tax rate of 25% on agricultural products, including wheat, barley, summer crops, olive trees, goats and beehives, in addition to occasional revenues; a total of 6,000 akçe. Pottery remains from the Ottoman era have also been found here.

In 1838 Edward Robinson, calling it Kefr Adan, noted it among many other villages on the plain; Lajjun, Umm al-Fahm, Ti'inik, Silat al-Harithiya, Al-Yamun and el Barid, located in the District of Jenin, also called Haritheh esh-Shemaliyeh.

In 1870 Victor Guérin found at Kafr Dan “a broken column and a certain number of cut stones of ancient appearance.” Guérin estimated that the village had 300 inhabitants. In 1870/1871 (1288 AH), an Ottoman census listed the village in the nahiya of Shafa al-Gharby.

In 1882 the PEF’s Survey of Western Palestine described the area as a "village of moderate size on the slope of the hills, built of stone, with olives below, and a well on the west.” They called the village “Kefr Adan”.

=== British Mandate era ===
In the 1922 census of Palestine, conducted by the British Mandate authorities, Kufr Dan had a population of 486; all Muslims, increasing in the 1931 census to 603, still all Muslim, in a total of 135 houses.

In the 1945 statistics, the population was 850, all Muslims, with 7,328 dunams of land, according to an official land and population survey. 5 dunams were used for citrus and bananas, 2,680 for plantations and irrigable land, 3,799 for cereals, while 34 dunams were built-up (urban) land.

=== Jordanian era ===
In the wake of the 1948 Arab–Israeli War, and after the 1949 Armistice Agreements, Kafr Dan came under Jordanian rule.

The Jordanian census of 1961 found 1,262 inhabitants.

=== Post 1967 ===
Since the Six-Day War in 1967, Kafr Dan has been under Israeli occupation.

In 2009, Kafr Dan Village Council was upgraded into a municipality. The mayor, Bilal Mer'i, joined with Prime Minister Rami Hamdullah for the ceremony.

In 2020, a 5 MW solar farm, the Noor Jenin PV Solar Plant, was built in the area, consisting of 13,500 panels.

== Bibliography ==
- Barron, J.B., ed. (1923). Palestine: Report and General Abstracts of the Census of 1922. Government of Palestine.
- Conder, C.R.; Kitchener, H.H. (1882). The Survey of Western Palestine: Memoirs of the Topography, Orography, Hydrography, and Archaeology. Vol. 2. London: Committee of the Palestine Exploration Fund.
- Government of Jordan, Department of Statistics (1964). First Census of Population and Housing. Volume I: Final Tables; General Characteristics of the Population (PDF).
- Government of Palestine, Department of Statistics (1945). Village Statistics, April, 1945.
- Guérin, V. (1875). Description Géographique Historique et Archéologique de la Palestine (in French). Vol. 2: Samarie, pt. 2. Paris: L'Imprimerie Nationale.
- Hadawi, S. (1970). Village Statistics of 1945: A Classification of Land and Area ownership in Palestine. Palestine Liberation Organization Research Center.
- Hütteroth, W.-D.; Abdulfattah, K. (1977). Historical Geography of Palestine, Transjordan and Southern Syria in the Late 16th Century. Erlanger Geographische Arbeiten, Sonderband 5. Erlangen, Germany: Vorstand der Fränkischen Geographischen Gesellschaft. ISBN 3-920405-41-2.
- Mills, E., ed. (1932). Census of Palestine 1931. Population of Villages, Towns and Administrative Areas. Jerusalem: Government of Palestine.
- Palmer, E.H. (1881). The Survey of Western Palestine: Arabic and English Name Lists Collected During the Survey by Lieutenants Conder and Kitchener, R. E. Transliterated and Explained by E.H. Palmer. Committee of the Palestine Exploration Fund.
- Robinson, E.; Smith, E. (1841). Biblical Researches in Palestine, Mount Sinai and Arabia Petraea: A Journal of Travels in the year 1838. Vol. 3. Boston: Crocker & Brewster.
- Zertal, A. (2016). The Manasseh Hill Country Survey. Vol. 3. Boston: BRILL. ISBN 978-9004312302.
