= Zero Point, Dhaka =

Square in Dhaka, Bangladesh

Coordinates: 23.7276442°N 90.4105668°E

Noor Hossain Square, commonly known as Zero Point, is a square situated in Gulistan, Dhaka, Bangladesh.

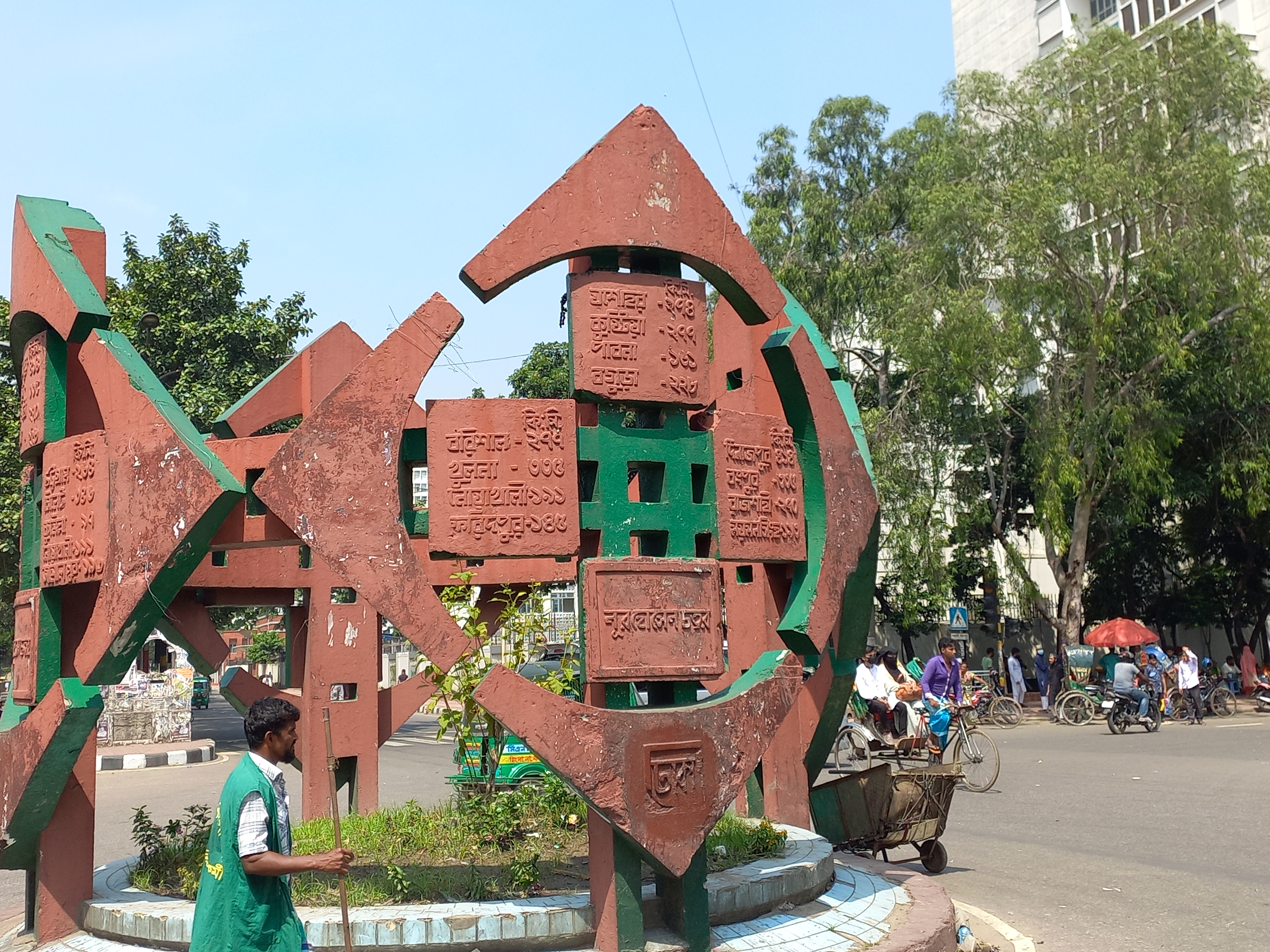
Noor Hossain Square, commonly known as Zero Point

== Description ==
It is the center of Bangladesh and all buses around the country stop here. It is named after Noor Hossain who was killed by police during the mass uprising in 1987 at the place. It is near to the General Post Office building. It is a busy place as the headquarters of Awami League at Shaheed Abrar Fahad Avenue, Muktijoddha Sangsad KC, Bangladesh Secretariat and National Stadium is situated around it.
