= Noor Palace =

Coordinates: 59°42′58″N 17°49′11″E

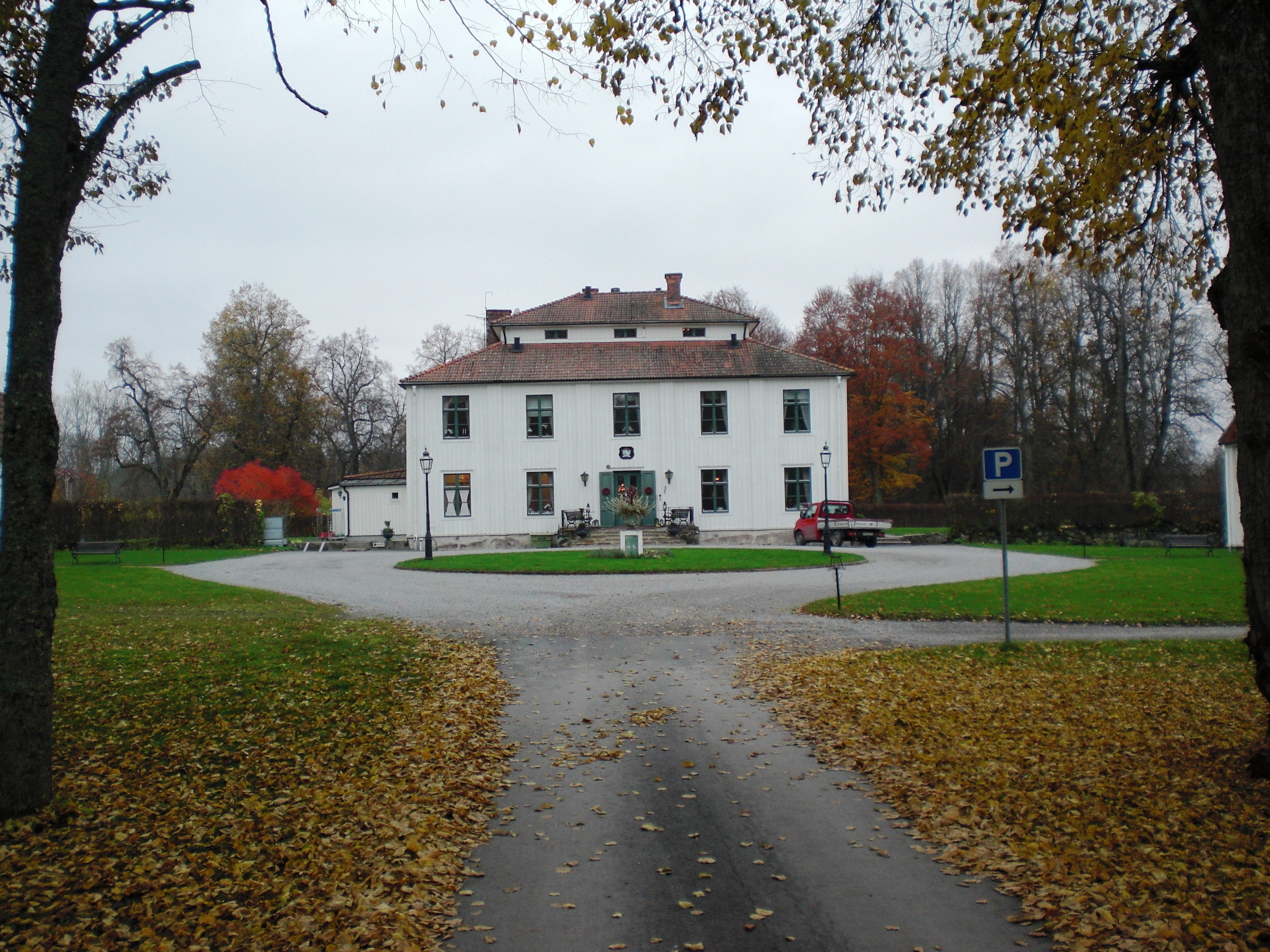
Noor mansion

Noor palace is a 14th-century mansion in Knivsta, Sweden.

Noor palace was confiscated as part of the reduction by King Charles XI in 1686, whereafter it was used as a royal hunting lodge. In 1689 King Charles XI sold the mansion to his adviser Count Nils Gyldenstolpe. He rebuilt the mansion in Swedish Carolean Style (karolinerstil), the style of fashion in Sweden during the period of the two Carolean kings, based on drawings by Jean de la Vallée. Between 1761 and into the 1980s Noor palace was owned by members of the noble Hermelin family. Erik Dahlberg made a drawing of the house for his Suecia antiqua et hodierna.

Nobel laureate Verner von Heidenstam wrote his historical novel The Caroleans (Karolinerna) at Noor palace in 1897, during a spell of one year at the mansion to benefit from its late 17th century atmosphere. The lands of the manor were divided up into 70 plots in 1943.

Noor palace was renovated during 1996-97 and is now a privately owned conference centre.

== Gallery ==
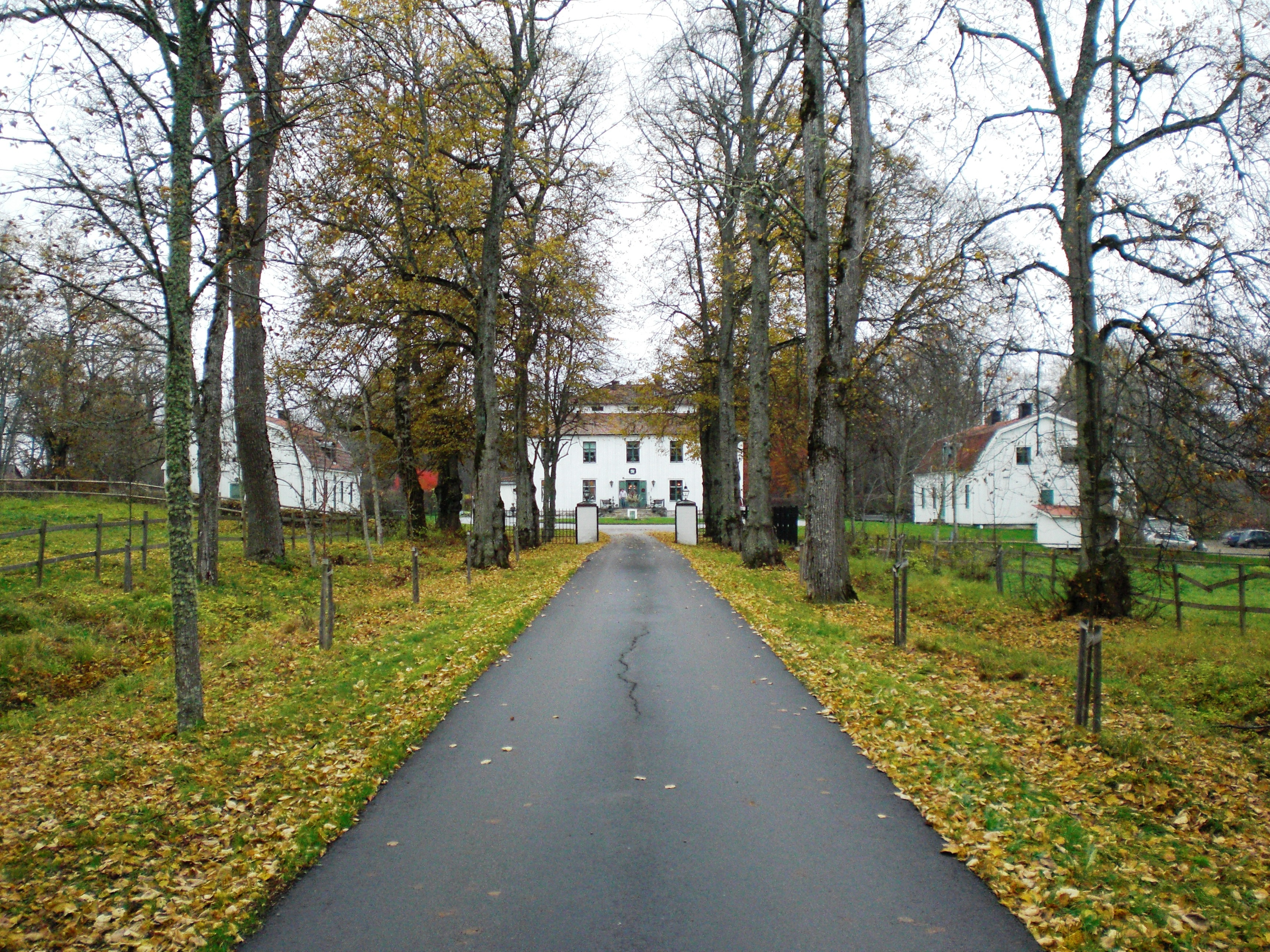
The mansion allee

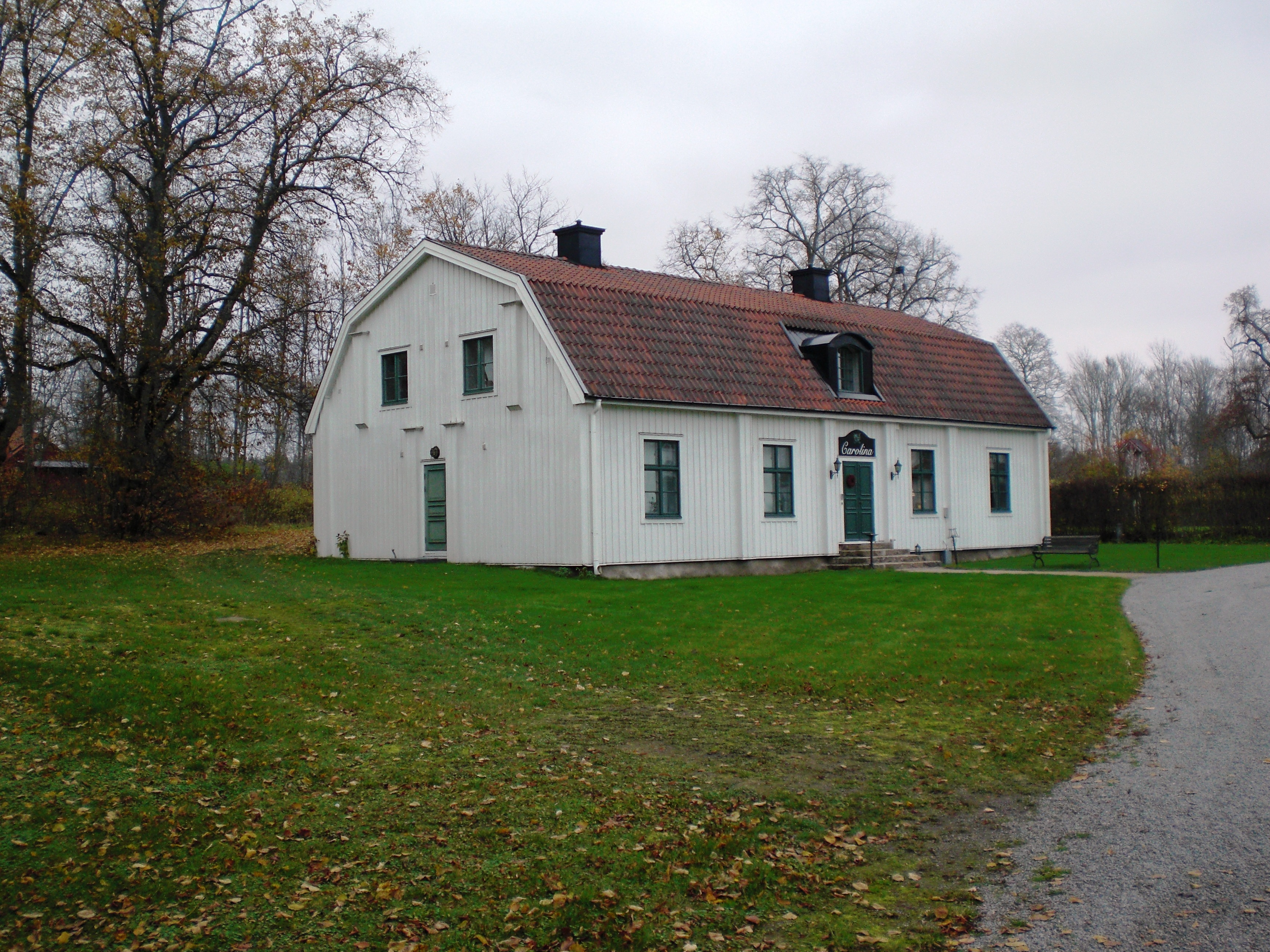
The northwestern wing

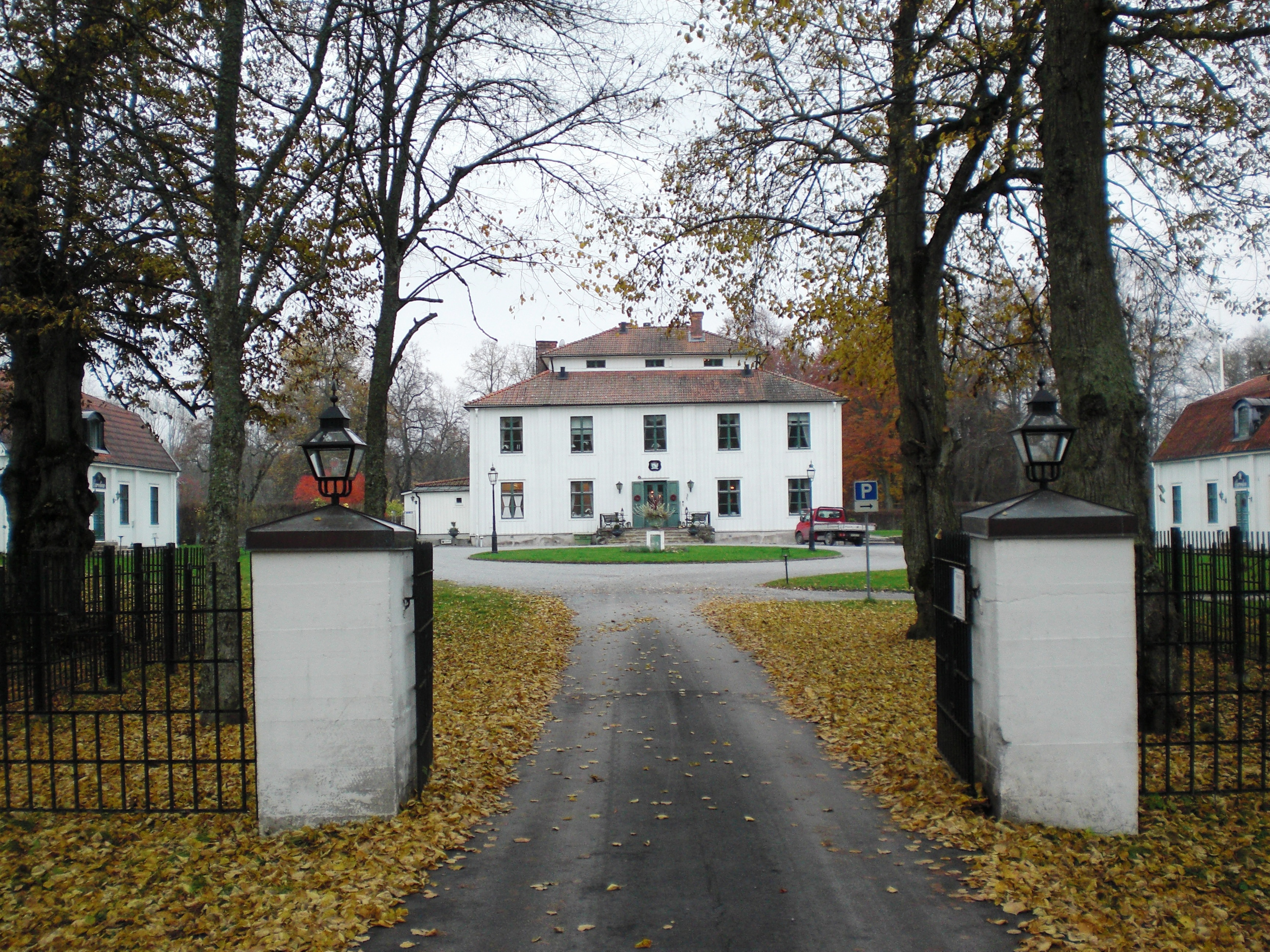
The mansion court entrance
