= Nur-e Olya =

Nur-e Olya نورعليا
- Village
- Location within Iran
- Coordinates: 34°04′41″N 47°11′57″E
- Country: Iran
- Province: Kermanshah
- County: Kermanshah
- Bakhsh: Firuzabad
- Rural District: Sar Firuzabad

Population (2006)
  - Total: 137
- Time zone: UTC+3:30 (IRST)
  - Summer (DST): UTC+4:30 (IRDT)

Nur-e Olya (Persian: نورعليا, also Romanized as Nūr-e ‘Olyā) is a village in Sar Firuzabad Rural District, Firuzabad District, Kermanshah County, Kermanshah Province, Iran. At the 2006 census, its population was 137, in 29 families.
