= Noor Hossain =

Bangladeshi activist (1961–1987)

Shaheed Noor Hossain
- শহীদ নূর হোসেন
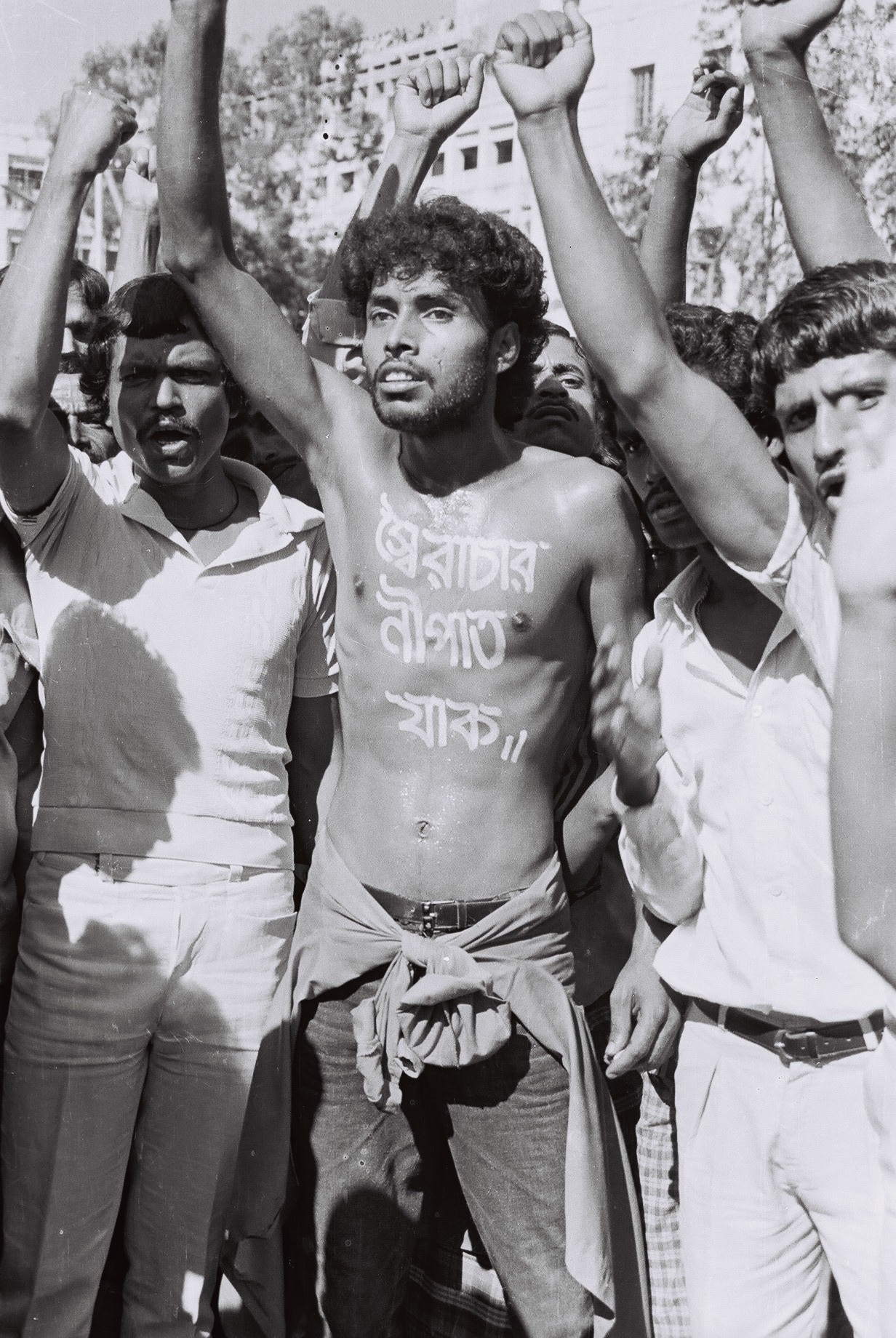
- Hossain wearing the words "Let tyranny die!" (Note: Bengali: স্বৈরাচার নীপাত যাক//", romanized: Shoirachar Nipat Jaak) at a protest for democracy, minutes before his death. Photographed by Dinu Alam.
- Born: 1961; East Pakistan
- Died: November 10, 1987 (aged 26); Dhaka, Bangladesh
- Cause of death: Shot by firearms by the Bangladesh Police
- Resting place: Jurain, Dhaka
- Monuments: Noor Hossain Square (formerly Zero Point)
- Known for: Being a symbol of opposition against Ershad's government and later as a symbol for the democracy movement in Bangladesh
- Parent(s): Mujibur Rahman (father); Marium Bibi (mother)
- Relatives: (1) Ali Hossain (brother), (3) Delwar Hossain (brother), (4) Anwar hossain (brother),(5) Shahana begum (sister)

Noor Hossain (also rendered as Nur Hossain; Bengali: নূর হোসেন, romanized: Nūr Hōsēn; 1961 – November 10, 1987) was a Bangladeshi activist who was killed by the police on 10 November 1987, while protesting against Ershad administration near Zero Point, Dhaka. Zero Point was later renamed as Noor Hossain Square and the anniversary of his death is officially commemorated each year as the Noor Hossain Day.

He is one of the most widely known martyrs of Bangladesh's pro-democracy movement.

== Early life ==
Hossain's ancestral home on his father's side was in the village of Jhatibunia, which is located in Mathbaria Upazila, Pirojpur District. His family moved to 79/1 Banagram Road, Dhaka after the Bangladesh Liberation War in 1971. Noor Hossain attended Radhasundari Primary School, which was also on Banagram Road. He was admitted to a motor driving school and received training in driving like his father. He served as a leader of the Bangladesh Awami Jubo League, the youth organisation of the Bangladesh Awami League. He was widely regarded as embodying the struggles of the country’s ordinary citizens and has since become a notable public symbol in Bangladesh.

== Dhaka Siege ==
On November 10th 1987, political opponents came together for what they called a "Dhaka Siege" (Dhaka Blockade) to demand an end to the rule of President Hussain Muhammad Ershad based on violations of democracy. Although he had installed himself in power with the 1982 coup d'état, he won the May 1986 general election but opponents charged it as fraudulent. The Awami League and Bangladesh National Party united in opposition against Ershad's rule. One opposition demand was an election of the National Assembly under a non-partisan caretaker government. The rally turned violent, and several leaders and protesters including Noor Hossain were killed in the ensuing riots while several hundred injured. Noor Hossain was among three Jubo League members killed at a protest rally. The other two were leaders Nurul Huda Babul and Aminul Huda Tito. In the aftermath, the opposition called for a nationwide protest strike on November 11 and 12.

Hossain is now associated in Bangladesh with the anti-autocracy and pro-democracy movement. At the time he was shot, his body carried several slogans in white paint. He wore the slogan "Down with autocracy" (Shairachar nipat jak) on his chest, and on his back, he had written "Let Democracy Be Free" (Ganatantra mukti pak). His death raised opposition sentiment directed against the Ershad government.

Ershad was forced out of office on December 6, 1990 as a result of the mass movement that grew from the Dhaka Siege. After Ershad left office, Khaleda Zia of the BNP was elected as Bangladesh's first female prime minister and a year later, the government established a national anniversary to commemorate the event. It was first called the "Historic November 10 observance", but the Awami League supported the name "Noor Hossain Day" by which it is known today. Ershad's Jatiya Party became part of the Awami League coalition after its victory in the June 1996 general election.

Noor Hossain and the square remained significant for protesters after Hossain's death in 1987 and Ershad's removal in 1990. In 1993, the Awami League led protesters to the square on the occasion of the November 10 anniversary against the BNP government which also provoked a reaction from the police.

In 1996, Ershad officially apologised for Hossain's death before parliament and also to Hossain's father. Ershad maintained his apology but also criticised the opposition for using him as a symbol against his government. In 2012, he said, "You (the opposition) came up with dead bodies as they were needed to spark demonstrations." His Jatiya Party does recognise November 10th but as "Democracy Day" (Ganatantra Dibash).

== Accounts and reactions ==
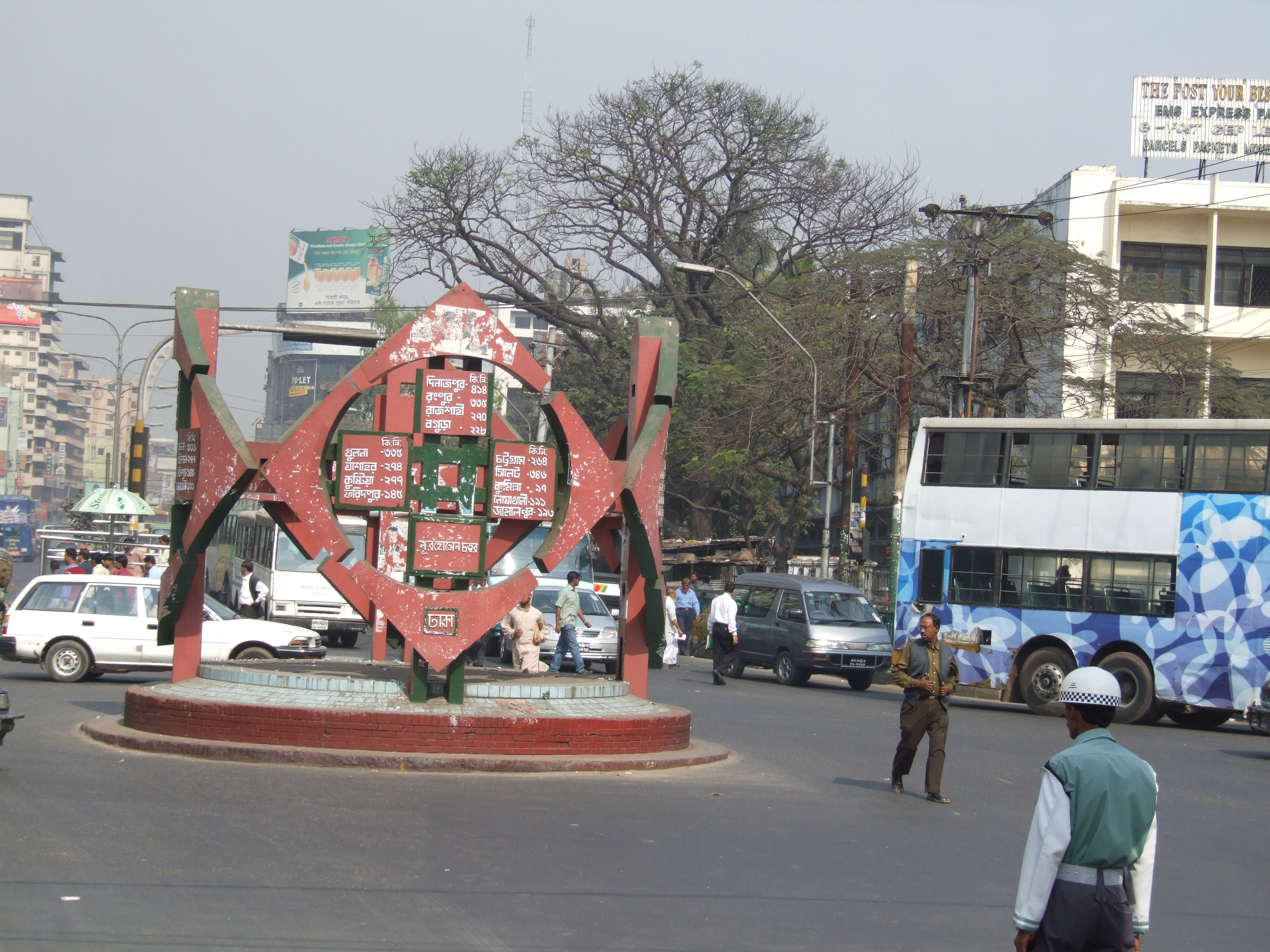
Zero Point was renamed Noor Hossain Square

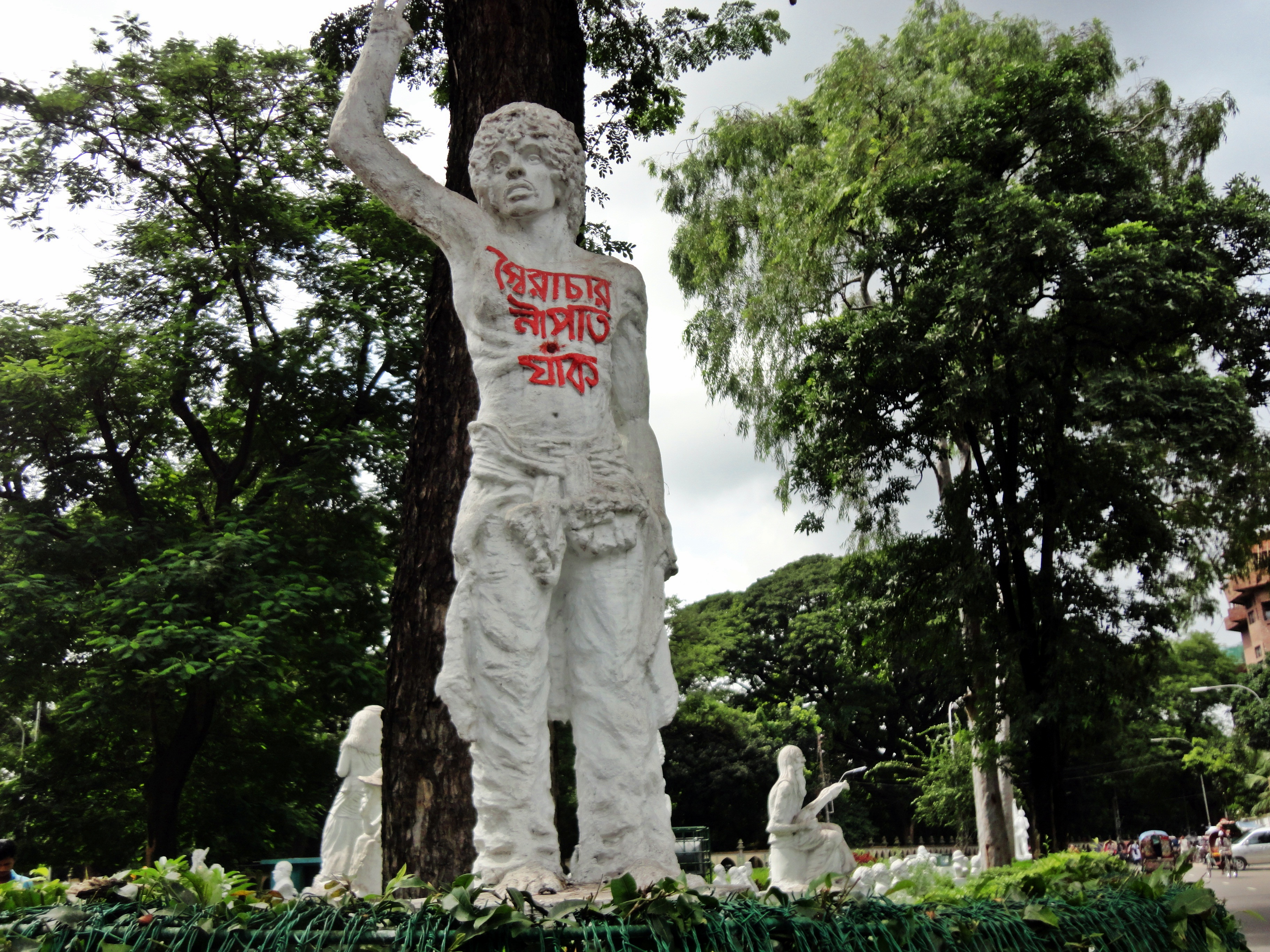
Statue of Nur Hossain

Bangladesh's former Prime Minister Sheikh Hasina has given her own account of Hossain's death: "I remember what happened on that day. Noor Hossain was standing beside me when we took out our procession. I called him and told him they would kill him for what he had inscribed on his chest. Then he brought his head near the window of my car and said, 'Sister, you just bless me. I will sacrifice my life to free democracy."

Hasina also said, "Bangladesh got back the rights to vote and food in exchange of Shaheed Nur Hossain’s supreme sacrifice."

Marium Bibi, Hossain's mother, has most recently said, "I still don’t see anything for which my son died." In an earlier interview, she said, "It is hard for any mother to lose her son. But I have no sorrows... I am proud of Noor."

== In popular culture ==
The event of his death is honoured each year as cultural and political organisations sponsor special programs for observance the day. The day is officially commemorated as Shohid Noor Hossain Day in Bangladesh.

Photographs of Noor Hossain wearing slogans on his chest taken by Dinu Alam and back taken by Pavel Rahaman were taken shortly before his death and become an important visual icon in Bangladesh representing the struggle for democracy.

A postage stamp was issued by Bangladesh in honour of his martyrdom.

Hossain is the subject of the Bengali film Buk tar Bangladesher hridoy.

A fictional character named "Nur Hossain" appears in Neamat Imam's novel The Black Coat.

== Gallery ==
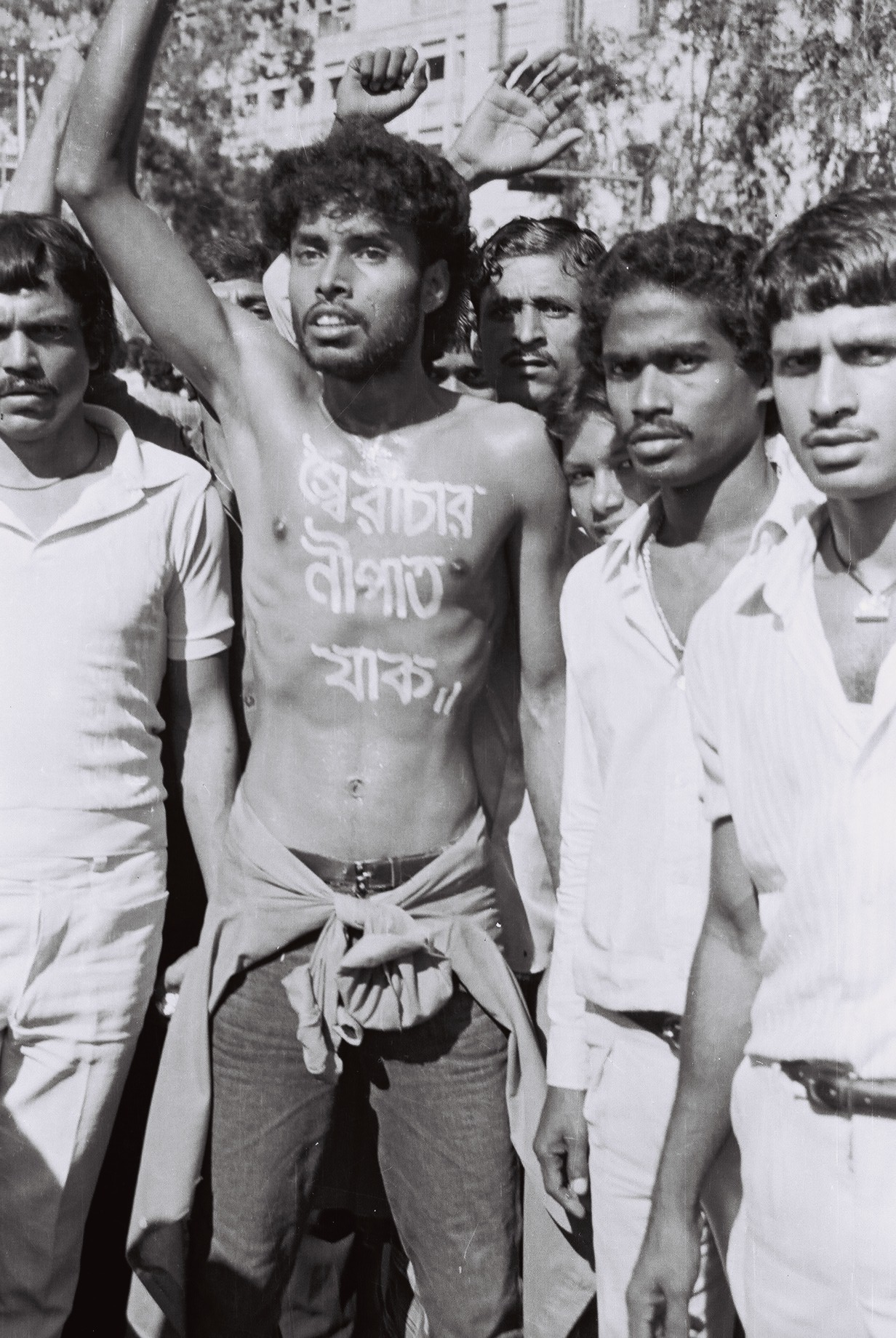
Noor Hossain

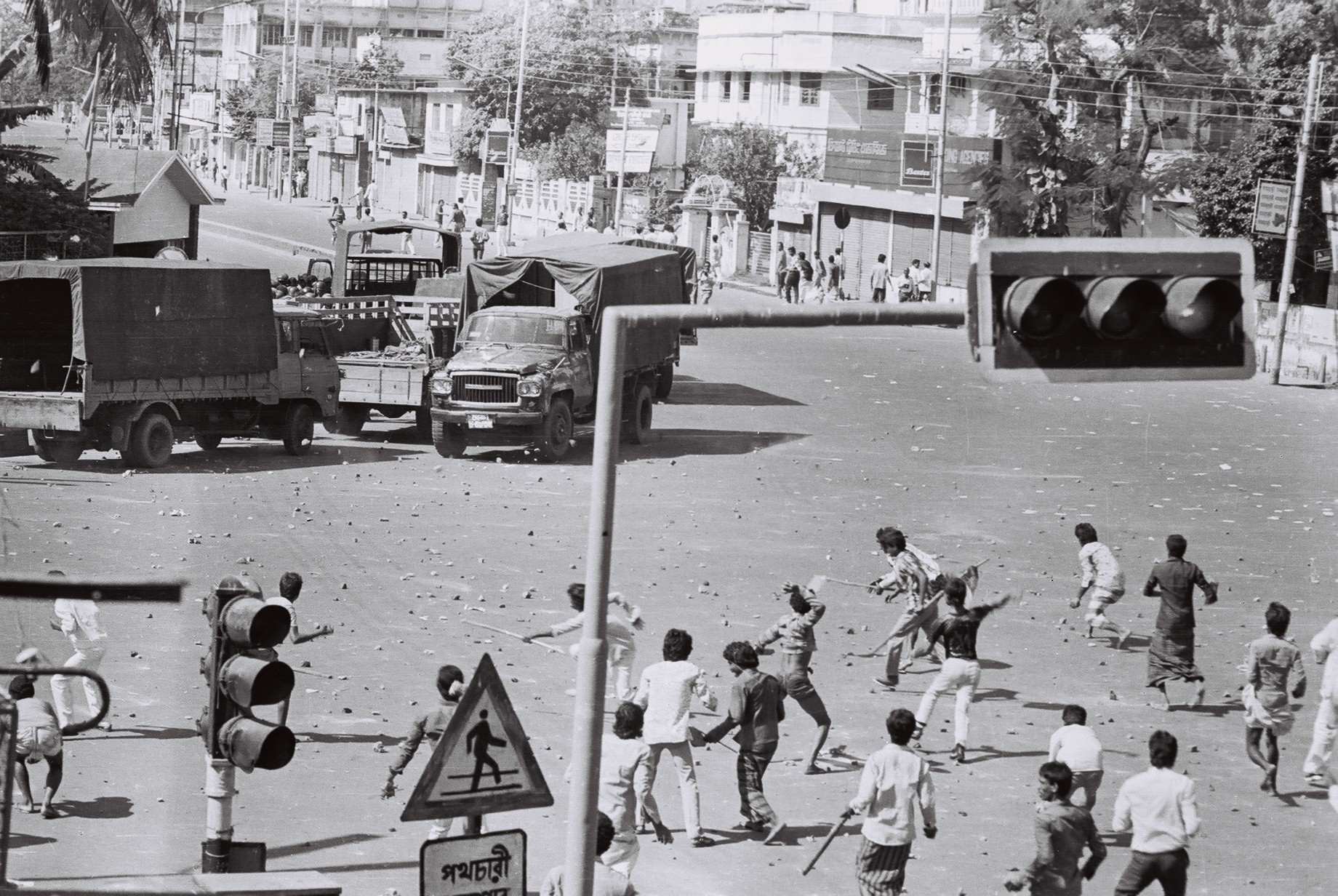
Protesters throw stones at police

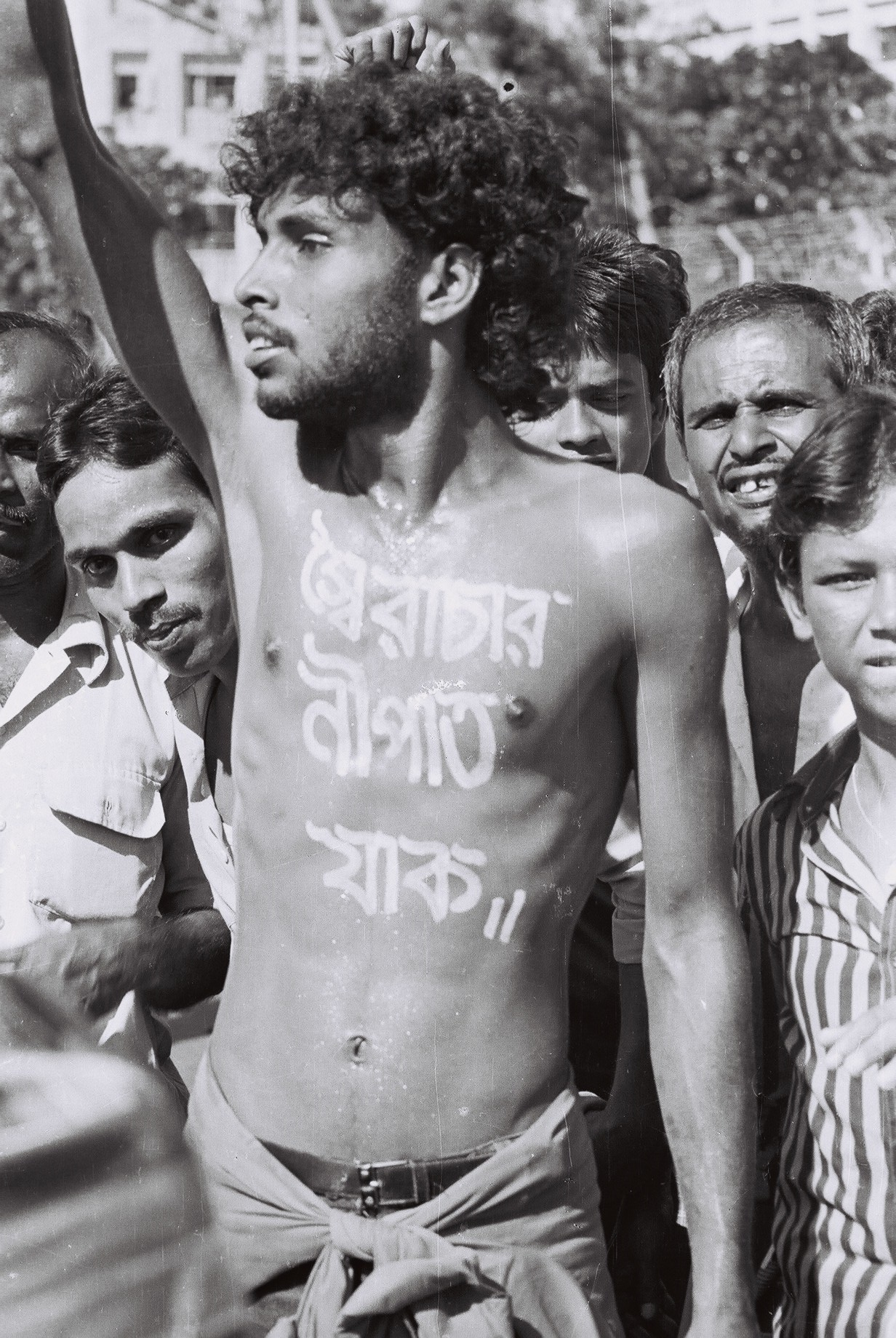
Noor Hossain at 10 November 1987 protest for democracy in Dhaka

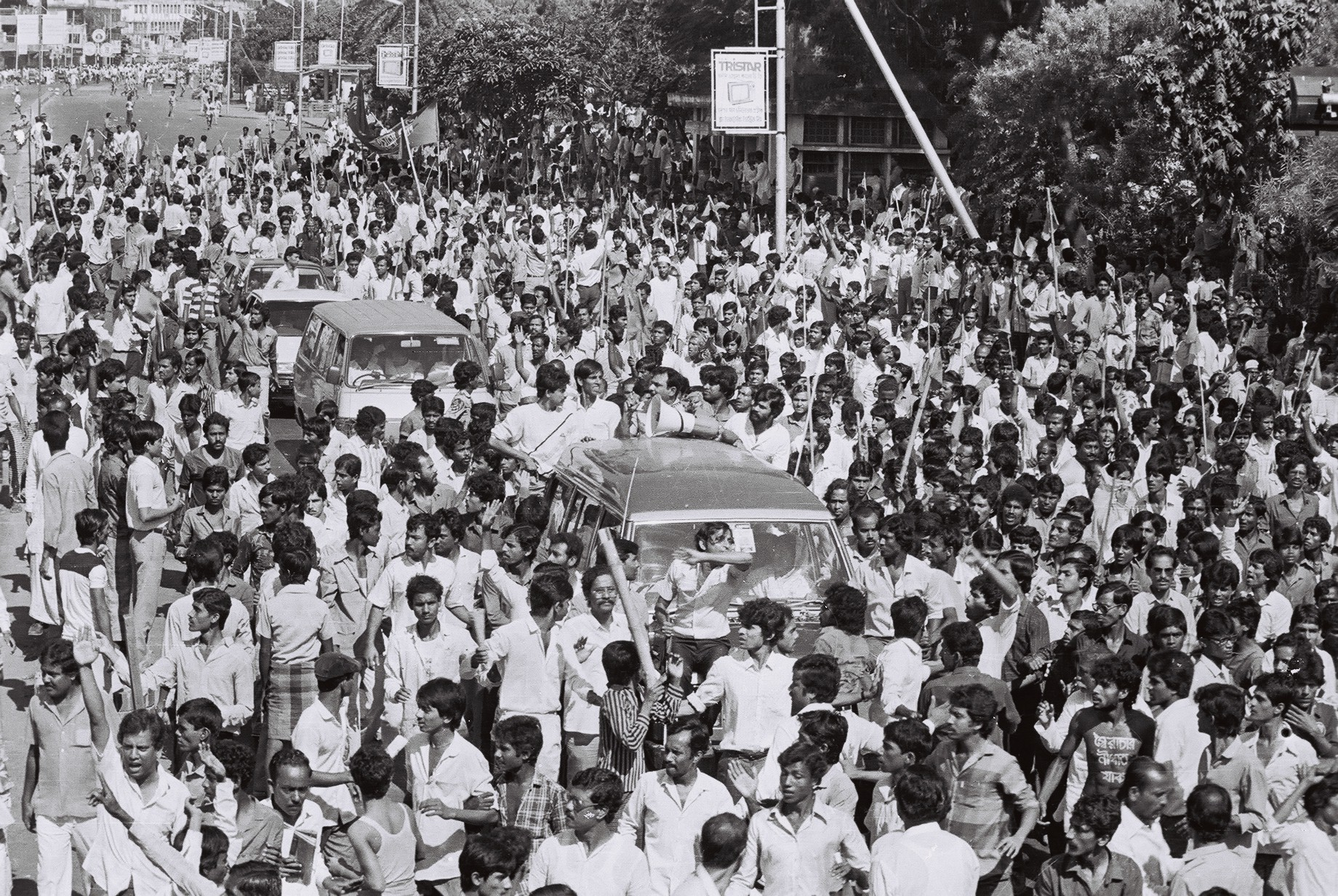
স্বৈরাচার নীপাত যাক// Shoirachar Nipat Jaak, Noor Hossain at Awami League Rally on 10 Nov 1987 Protest.
