= Noor Hossain Day =

Public holiday in Bangladesh

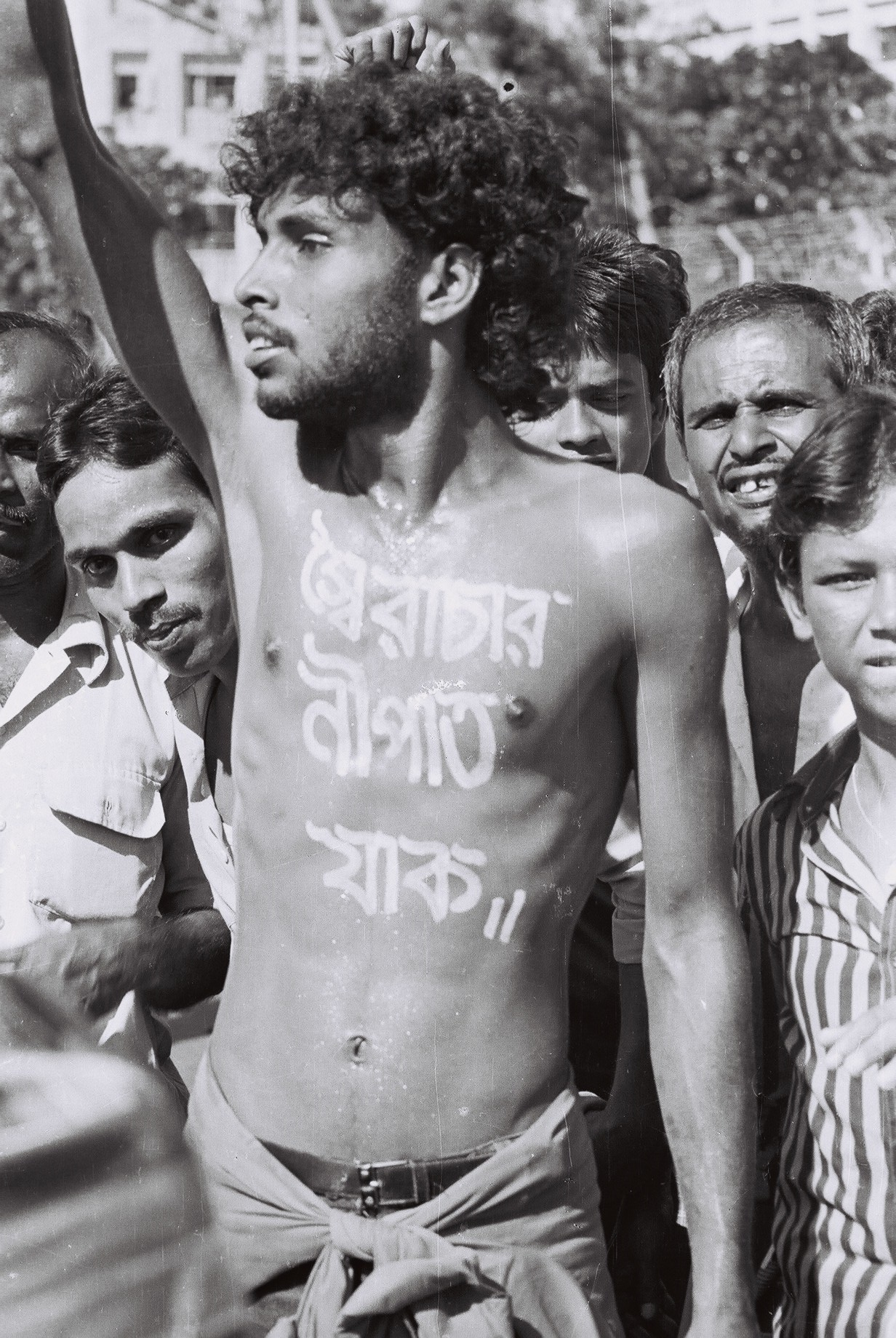
Noor Hossain protesting on 10 November 1987.

Noor Hossain Day (Bengali: নূর হোসেন দিবস) is a national day in Bangladesh observed every 10 November in order to commemorate the martyrdom of Noor Hossain while protesting for the establishment of democracy in the country against the rule of Hussain Muhammad Ershad in 1987. Noor Hossain who was a motor driver by profession was killed by the police force. At the time he was shot, his body carried several slogans in white paint. He wore the slogan "Down with autocracy" (Sairachar nipat jak) on his chest, and on his back, he had written the slogan "Let Democracy Be Free" (Ganatantra mukti pak). The day is honored each year as cultural and political organizations sponsor special programs for observance the day. It was first called "Historic November 10 observance" but the Awami League supported the phrase "Noor Hossain Day", by which it is known today.
