= Nur railway station =

Railway station in Pakistan

Coordinates: 33.629871°N 73.013153°E

General information
- Owner: Ministry of Railways

Other information
- Station code: NUR

History
- Former names: Great Indian Peninsula Railway
Location

Nur railway station (Urdu: نور ریلوے اسٹیشن) is located in Pakistan.

== See also ==
- List of railway stations in Pakistan
- Pakistan Railways
