= Noor Jenin PV Solar Plant =

Photovoltaic power plant in Kafr Dan, Jenin, Palestine

- Country: Palestine
- Location: Kafr Dan, Jenin
- Coordinates: 32°28′24.7″N 35°15′49.8″E
- Commission date: October 2020

Power generation
- Nameplate capacity: 5 MW

The Noor Jenin PV Solar Plant is a photovoltaic power station in Kafr Dan, Jenin Governorate, Palestine.

== Architecture ==
The power plant spans over an area of 6 hectares.

== Technical specifications ==
The power plant has an installed capacity of 5 MW. It consists of 13,500 solar panels. It is part of the 200 MW Noor Palestine Solar Energy Program.

== See also ==
- Energy in Palestine
