= List of populated places in Punjab, Pakistan =

Populated places in Pakistani province of Punjab

This is a list of populated places in the province of Punjab, Pakistan.

Place	Type	District
== A ==
Awan Sharif	Village	Gujrat
Aaliwala	Town	Dera Ghazi Khan
Abbakhel	Village	Mianwali
Abbasian Wala	Village	Bhakkar
Abdul Hakeem	City	Khanewal
Achh	Village	Gujrat
Adamke	Village	Sialkot
Addepur	Village	Sahiwal
Addowal	Town	Gujrat
Adhi Kot	Village	Khushab
Adiala	Village	Rawalpindi
Adrana	Village	Jhelum
Agra	Town	Sahiwal
Ahla	Village	Mandi Bahauddin
Ahmadabad	Town	Okara
Ahmed Nager Chatha	Town	Gujranwala
Ahmedabad	Village	Jhelum
Ahmedpur East	City	Bahawalpur
Ahmadpur Sial	City	Jhang
Aima Bari	Village	Jhelum
Ajjowal	Village	Mandi Bahauddin
Ajnala, Pakistan	Town	Gujrat
Akhori	Village	Attock
Alamgarh	Town	Gujrat
Ali Pur Chatta	Town	Gujranwala
Aligarh, Pakistan	Town	Toba Tek Singh
Alipur Chatha	City	Gujranwala
Alluwali	Village	Mianwali
Alpa Kalan	Town	Kasur
Aminpur	City	Faisalabad
Amra Kalan	Village	Gujrat
Anga, Punjab	Village	Khushab
Angadpura	Village	Toba Tek Singh
Angakiri	Village	Vehari
Arain Abad	Village	Jhelum
Arazi Hasnal	Village	Rawalpindi
Arbianwala	Village	Chiniot
Arifwala	City	Pakpattan
Arjun Singhwali	Village	Okara
Arra, Pakistan	Village	Chakwal
Arrar	Village	Chakwal
Asghari	Town	Sahiwal
Atari, Pakistan	Town	Khanewal
Athara Hazari	City	Jhang
Atma Singh, Pakistan	Village	Gujrat
Attock	City	Attock
== B ==
Baddo	Village	Mandi Bahauddin
Baddoke Cheema	Village	Sialkot
Baddomalhi	City	Narowal
Badlot	Village	Jhelum
Badnian	Village	Rawalpindi
Baghiana Kalan	Village	Kasur
Bagrianwala	Town	Gujrat
Bahadur Garh	Town	Dera Ghazi Khan
Bahadurpura	Town	Kasur
Baharwal	Town	Gujrat
Bahawalnagar	Capital	Bahawalnagar
Bahawalpur	City	
Bairi, Pakistan	Village	Sialkot
Bait Bakhtiari	Village	Bahawalpur
Bajarwala	Village	Gujrat
Bakhar Bar	Village	Sargodha
Balkassar	Village	Chakwal
Balokassar	Village	Chakwal
Ban Hafiz Jee	Village	Mianwali
Bandial Janubi	Village	Khushab
Banga, Pakistan	Village	Faisalabad
Bangla Manthar	Town	Rahim Yar Khan
Bareela	Town	Gujrat
Barnali	Village	Gujrat
Baroo	Town	Gujrat
Barthi, Punjab	Town	Dera Ghazi Khan
Basal, Pakistan	Village	Attock
Basharat	Village	Chakwal
Bashera	Village	Sahiwal
Basia, Pakistan	Village	Attock
Basra, Pakistan	Village	Chakwal
Basti Babbar	Town	Bahawalpur
Basti Buzdar	Town	Dera Ghazi Khan
Basti Dhandlah	Town	Bahawalpur
Basti Fauja	Town	Dera Ghazi Khan
Basti Malana	Town	Dera Ghazi Khan
Basti Nari	Town	Bahawalpur
Bathou	Village	Attock
Bator, Gujrat	Village	Gujrat
Bazidpur	Town	Kasur
Bazurgwal	Village	Gujrat
Begal	Village	Chakwal
Begowala	Town	Sialkot
Beharaj	Town	Gujrat
Beharwal Kalan	Village	Kasur
Behlolpur	Town	Gujrat
Berianwali	Village	
Bhaddar	Village	Gujrat
Bhagiwal	Town	Kasur
Bhago	Village	Gujrat
Bhagot	Village	
Bhagwal	Village	Gujrat
Bhakkar	Capital	Bhakkar
Bhalwal	City	Sargodha
Bhamba Kalan	Town	Kasur
Bharpur	Village	Chakwal
Bhagwal, Chakwal	Town	Chakwal
Bhedian Kalan	Town	Kasur
Bheen	Village	Chakwal
Bhelowal	Village	Jhelum
Bhera	City	Sargodha
Bhikhi Khurd	Village	Sargodha
Bhikhi, Pakistan	Town	Mandi Bahauddin
Bhilomar	Village	Chakwal
Bhindar Kalan	Village	Mandi Bahauddin
Bhoanj	Village	Jhelum
Bhoe Asal	Town	Kasur
Bhong	Town	Rahim Yar Khan
Bhoun	Village	Chakwal
Bidher	Village	Chakwal
Bido Bhatti	Village	Gujrat
Bijar, Punjab	Village	Khushab
Bilasur	Town	Toba Tek Singh
Bilochwala	Town	Lahore
Bishan Daur	Village	Jhelum
Bismillapur	Town	Lahore
Bohge	Village	
Boken, Pakistan	Village	
Boota	Village	Attock
Botala	Village	Khushab
Buchal Kalan	Village	Chakwal
Bucheki	City	Nankana Sahib
Budhial	Village	Chakwal
Bunga Hayat	Town	Pakpattan
Burewala	City	Vehari
Burj Jeway Khan	Town	Okara
== C ==
Chahal, Kasur	Village	Kasur
Chak 104 NB	Village	Sargodha
Chak 285 JB	Village	Toba Tek Singh
Chak 217 GB	Village	Faisalabad
Chak 38 3R	Village	Bahawalnagar
Chak 44/12.L	Village	Sahiwal
Chak 667/8 GB	Village	Toba Tek Singh
Chak Fourteen MB	Village	Khushab
Chak Jamal	Village	Jhelum
Chak Jani	Town	Jhelum
Chak Khasa	Village	Jhelum
Chak Malook	Village	Chakwal
Chak Manju	Town	Gujrat
Chak no 7/p	Village	Rahim Yar Khan
Chak No. 69/EB Ugroo	Village	Pakpattan
Chak No.21/MB	Village	Khushab
Chak Number Three	Village	
Chak Shadi	Village	Jhelum
Chak Umra	Village	Chakwal
Chakbasawa	Town	Mandi Bahauddin
Chakchohdu village	Village	Sialkot
Chaklala, Rawalpindi	Town	Rawalpindi
Chakora, Pakistan	Village	Chakwal
Chakori Bhalowal	Town	Gujrat
Chakori Sher Ghazi	Town	Gujrat
Chakri Rajgan	Village	Jhelum
Chakral	UC	Mianwali
Chakwal	Capital	Chakwal
Chanda Singh Wala	Village	Kasur
Chandarkey Rajputan	Village	Narowal
Changa Bangial	Town	Rawalpindi
Changa Manga	City	Kasur and Lahore
Chap Sandi	Village	Bhakkar
Chapri, Mianwali	Village	Mianwali
Charat Singhwala	Village	Sahiwal
Chathian Wala	Town	Kasur
Chattal	Village	Chakwal
Chawinda	Town	Sialkot
Chechian	Town	Gujrat
Chhidru	Village	Mianwali
Chhimber	Village	Gujrat
Chhimmon	Town	Mandi Bahauddin
Chhokar Kalan	Village	Gujrat
Chhowni Sulehrian	Village	Sialkot
Chicha, Pakistan	Village	Faisalabad
Chichawatni	City	Sahiwal
Chillianwala	Town	Mandi Bahauddin
Chiniot	City	Chiniot
Chishtian	City	Bahawalnagar
Choa Ganj Ali Shah	Village	Chakwal
Choa Saidan Shah Tehsil	Village	Chakwal
Choa Saidanshah	Town	Chakwal
Chopala	Town	Gujrat
Choran	Village	Jhelum
Chotala	Village	Jhelum
Choti Zerine	Town	Dera Ghazi Khan
Chotibala	Town	Dera Ghazi Khan
Chowk Azam	City	Layyah
Chunian	City	Kasur
Churatta	Town	Dera Ghazi Khan
== D ==
Dab, Pakistan	Village	Chakwal
Dabb Balouchan	Village	Mianwali
Dabri	Village	Gujranwala
Dadhocha	Village	Rawalpindi
Dadwala	Town	Bahawalpur
Daftuh	Town	Kasur
Daiwal	Village	Khushab
Dajal, Rajanpur	Town	Rajanpur
Dakhali	Village	Rawalpindi
Dalwal	Village	Chakwal
Danda Shah Bilawal	Town	Talagang
Dandot RS	Village	Jhelum
Dandot	Village	Chakwal
Darapur	Village	Jhelum
Dargahi Shah	Village	Jhang
Darkhast Jamal Khan	Town	Dera Ghazi Khan
Darya Khan	Town	Bhakkar
Daska	City	Sialkot
Dasuha, Faisalabad	Village	Faisalabad
Daud Khel, Punjab	Town	Mianwali
Daulatpur, Jhelum	Village	Jhelum
Daurdad	Village	Attock
Davispur	Village	Sargodha
Deo Sial	Town	Kasur
Deona Mandi	Town	Gujrat
Dera Ghazi Khan Tehsil	Town	Dera Ghazi Khan
Dera Ghazi Khan	City	Dera Ghazi Khan
Devi, Punjab	Town	Rawalpindi
Dhab Kalan	Village	Chakwal
Dhab Pari	Village	Chakwal
Dhainke	Village	
Dhakkar	Town	Gujrat
Dhalla	Town	Rawalpindi
Dhallewali	Town	Sialkot
Dhamiak	Village	Rawalpindi
Dhamial	Village	Rawalpindi
Dhangri	Village	
Dhanyala	Village	Jhelum
Dhapai	Village	Mandi Bahauddin
Dhari Rai Ditta	Village	Attock
Dharyala Jalap	Village	Jhelum
Dhaular	Village	Chakwal
Dher Umid Ali Shah	City	Mianwali
Dher Umid Ali Shah	Village	Mianwali
Dhingana City	Village	Bhakkar
Dhok Darbal	Town	Chakwal
Dhok Darbal	Village	Chakwal
Dhok Gohar Shah	Village	Rawalpindi
Dhok Kasib	Village	Mandi Bahauddin
Dhoke Agri	Village	Chakwal
Dhoke Jamarghal	Hamlet	Jhelum
Dholan Hithar	Village	Kasur
Dhoria	Village	Gujrat
Dhoular	Village	Chakwal
Dhrabi	Village	Chakwal
Dhudhi Phapra	Village	Jhelum
Dhudial	Village	Chakwal
Dhudike	Village	Moga
Dhulli	Village	Chakwal
Dhunni	Village	
Dhurnal	Town	Chakwal
Dijkot	City	Faisalabad
Dilawar, Punjab	Village	Mandi Bahauddin
Dina, Pakistan	Town	
Dinga	City	Gujrat
Dipalpur	City	Okara
Doaba, Mianwali	Town	Mianwali
Domeli	Village	Jhelum
Dona Qutab Saru	Village	Bahawalnagar
Dowal	Village	Attock
Drahma, Punjab	Town	Dera Ghazi Khan
Dullah Bhadera	Village	Bahawalnagar
Dullah	Village	Chakwal
Dulmial	Village	Chakwal
Dumman	Village	Chakwal
Dunga Bunga	Town	Bahawalnagar
== F ==
Faisalabad	City	Faisalabad
Faizpur, Pakistan	Village	Pakpattan
Faqirwali	Town	Haroonabad Bahawalnagar
Faridkot, Khanewal	Village	Khanewal
Faridpur, Multan	Village	Multan
Faridpur, Narowal	Village	Narowal
Farooka	City	Sargodha
Fateh Bhand	Village	Gujrat
Fateh Jang	City	Attock
Fateh Khan	Town	Dera Ghazi Khan
Fattiwala	Village	Kasur
Fazal Katchh	Town	Dera Ghazi Khan
Ferozewala	Village	Shaikhupur
Firoza	Town	Rahim Yar Khan
== G ==
Gamoon wala	Village	Muzaffargarh
Ganehar	Town	Bahawalpur
Garh Mahal	Village	Jhelum
Garh Maharaja	Town	Jhang
Garh More	Town	Jhang
Gariwal	Village	Toba Tek Singh
Gerbla Syedan	Village	Sialkot
Ghakhar	Village	Attock
Gharibwal	Village	Jhelum
Ghator	Town	Lahore
Ghaus Abad	Town	Dera Ghazi Khan
Ghurko	Village	Gujrat
Gobindsar	Town	Lahore
Gochh	City	Gujrat
Gogera	Town	Okara
Gohar, Pakistan	Village	Kasur
Gojra	City	Toba Tek Singh
Golewali	Village	Khushab
Gondal	Town	Attock
Gop-e-Rah	Village	Kasur
Goughabad	Town	Lahore
Govindpura, Pakistan	Village	Kasur
Grinkot	Village	Kasur
Gujar Khan	City	Rawalpindi
Gujjar, Jhelum	Village	Jhelum
Gujranwala	City	Gujranwala
Gujrat City	City	Gujrat
Gujrat, Mianwali	Town	Mianwali
Gulberg, Lahore	Town	Lahore
Guliana, Gujrat	Village	Gujrat
Gulistan, Punjab	Town	Sahiwal
Gullen khel	Village	Mianwali
Gulzar Khanwala	Village	Dera Ghazi Khan
Gulzar, Punjab	Village	Mandi Bahauddin
Gulzarwala	Village	Dera Ghazi Khan
Gunja, Pakistan	Town	Gujrat
Gunjial Janubi	Village	Khushab
== H ==
Hadali	Town	Khushab
Hadda, Pakistan	Village	Sargodha
Hafizabad	City	Hafizabad
Hafizabad	Village	Hafizabad
Haji Chak	Village	Gujrat
Haji Ghazi	Town	Dera Ghazi Khan
Haji Muhammad	Town	Gujrat
Haji Shah	Town	Attock
Halla, Punjab	Town	Kasur
Hameed, Attock	Village	Attock
Hari Singwala	Town	Lahore
Haroonabad, Bahawalnagar	City	Bahawalnagar
Hasan Abdal	City	Attock
Hasilpur	City	Bahawalpur
Hast Khewa	Town	Chiniot
Haveli Lakha	City	Okara
Haveli Majoka	Village	Sargodha
Head Balloki	Headworks	Kasur
Hernoli	Town	Mianwali
Hero Sharqi	Town	Dera Ghazi Khan
Hujra Shah Muqeem	Town	Okara
== I ==
Isakhel	Town	Mianwali
Islam Pur Lokari	Village	Sargodha
Islamabad	Capital	Islamabad Capital Territory
== J ==
Jabairpur	Town	Chakwal
Jabbi Kasran	Village	Attock
Jabbi Shah Dilawar	Village	Chakwal
Jabbi Shareef	Town	Khushab
Jabboana	Town	Jhang
Jaboka	Town	Okara
Jagdeo, Pakistan	Village	Faisalabad
Jaguwala	Town	Kasur
Jahanawala	Village	Sargodha
Jairo Ratial	Village	Rawalpindi
Jaisak	Village	Mandi Bahauddin
Jajial	Village	Jhelum
Jajjal	Town	Kasur
Jakhar Imam Shah	Town	Dera Ghazi Khan
Jalalpur Bhattian	City	
Jalalpur Jattan	City	Gujrat
Jaluwali	Town	Dera Ghazi Khan
Jamali Noorpur	Town	Khushab
Jamber Khurd	Town	Kasur
Jamesabad	Town	Khanewal
Jammargal	Village	Jhelum
Jampur	City	Rajanpur
Jamsher Kalan	Town	Kasur
Jamsher Khurd	Town	Kasur
Jand Khanzada	Village	Chakwal
Jand Najjar	Village	Rawalpindi
Jand Tehsil	Village	Attock
Jand, Chakwal	Village	Chakwal
Jandiala Sher Khan	Town	Sheikhupura
Janewali	Village	Sialkot
Janhatal	Village	Rawalpindi
Janiwala	Town	Toba Tek Singh
Jaranwala	City	Faisalabad
Jarmot Kalan	Town	Rawalpindi
Jassial	Village	Talagang
Jaswal, Chakwal	Village	Chakwal
Jathekey	Village	Sialkot
Jauharabad	City	Khushab
Jauharabad-I	Town	Khushab
Jauharabad-II	Town	Khushab
Jaura Kalan	Village	Khushab
Jaura, Pakistan	Town	Gujrat
Jayya	Village	Mandi Bahauddin
Jhang	Capital	Jhang
Jharkal	Village	Khushab
Jhatla	Village	Rawalpindi
Jhelum	City	Jhelum
Jhoke Uttra	Town	Dera Ghazi Khan
== K ==
Kabirwala	City	Khanewal
Kabirwala	Town	Khanewal
Kadhar	Village	Mandi Bahauddin
Kahuta	Town	Rawalpindi
Kakowal	Village	Mandi Bahauddin
Kala Deo	Village	Jhelum
Kala Gujran	Town	Jhelum
Kalabagh	Town	Mianwali
Kaleke	Village	Hafizabad
Kallar Syedan	City	Rawalpindi
Kallur, Punjab	Town	Mianwali
Kallur	Village	Mianwali
Kallurkot	Town	Bhakkar
Kalsian Bhattian	Village	Sheikhupura
Kalsian	Village	Sheikhupura
Kalyan, Pakistan	Village	Lahore
Kamalia	City	Toba Tek Singh
Kaman, Pakistan	Town	Okara
Kamar Mushani Pakka	Town	Mianwali
Kamar Mushani	Town	Mianwali
Kandwal	Village	Jhelum
Kanganpur	City	Kasur
Kantrila	Village	Jhelum
Kantrili	Village	Jhelum
Kapoor pur	Village	Sialkot
Kapurpur	Town	Sialkot
Karnana	Town	Gujrat
Karor Lal Esan	City	Layyah
Karsal	Village	Chakwal
Karuli	Village	Chakwal
Karyala	Village	Chakwal
Kasan Wala	Village	Khushab
Kaslian	Village	Jhelum
Kasupur Dulhar	Village	Sargodha
Kasur	City	Kasur
Kathala Chenab	Town	Gujrat
Kathrian	Village	Rawalpindi
Kattowal	Village	Mandibahauddin
Khabaki	Village	Khushab
Khaglan Wala	Village	Mianwali
Khai Hithar	Town	Kasur
Khai Khurd	Village	Khushab
Khai	Village	
Khairo, Punjab	Town	
Khairpur Tamiwali	City	Bahawalpur
Khairpur village, Chakwal District	Village	Chakwal
Khairpur, Chakwal	Village	Chakwal
Khakhi	Town	Dera Ghazi Khan
Khan Muhammad Wala	Village	Sargodha
Khandowa	Village	Chakwal
Khanewal	City	Khanewal
Khanpur	City	Rahim Yar Khan
Khanqah Sharif	City	Bahawalpur
Khar, Punjab	Town	Muzaffargarh
Kharian Tehsil	Village	Gujrat
Khattan	Village	Bahawalnagar
Kharian	City	Gujrat
Khasala Kalan	Village	Rawalpindi
Khasala Khurd	Village	Rawalpindi
Khatwan	Village	Khushab
Khinger Kalan	Village	Rawalpindi
Khinger Khurd	Village	Rawalpindi
Khokhar zer	Village	Chakwal
Khola At Khanqah Sirajia	Village	Mianwali
Khoora	Village	Khushab
Khosa, Punjab	Town	Bahawalpur
Khotian	Village	Chakwal
Khudian	Town	Kasur
Khurd	Village	Jhelum
Khushab	City	Khushab
Khushipur	Town	Lahore
Kirtowal	Village	Mandi Bahauddin
Kohali, Faisalabad	Village	Faisalabad
Kohali, Jhelum	Village	Jhelum
Kohlian	Village	Sargodha
Kora Punjab	Village	Jhelum
Kot Abbas Pura	Village	Kasur
Kot Addu City	City	Muzaffargarh
Kot Chandi	Village	Lahore
Kot Chandna	Town	Mianwali
Kot Choudrain	Village	Chakwal
Kot Gullah	Village	Chakwal
Kot Haibat	Town	Dera Ghazi Khan
Kot Hasan Khan	Village	Hafizabad
Kot Isa Shah	Village	Jhang
Kot Ismail	Village	Chiniot
Kot Karam Khan	Town	Rahim Yar Khan
Kot Mubarak	Town	Dera Ghazi Khan
Kot Qaisrani	Town	Dera Ghazi Khan
Kot Qazi	Village	Chakwal
Kot Radha Kishan	City	Kasur
Kot Rajput	Town	Lahore
Kot Sarang	Village	Chakwal
Kot Waris	Village	Gujranwala
Kot Addu City	City	Muzaffargarh
Kotehra	Village	Mandi Bahauddin
Kotha Gujjran	Village	Gujrat
Kotha, Punjab	Town	Kasur
Kotla Arab Ali Khan	Town	Gujrat
Kotla Faqir	Village	Jhelum
Kotla Musa Khan	Village	Bahawalpur
Kotla Sarang Khan	Village	Gujrat
Kotli Loharan East	Town	Sialkot
Kotli Rai Abubakar	Town	Kasur
Kufri, Pakistan	Village	Khushab
Kull, Punjab	Town	Kasur
Kumarwala	City	
Kund	Village	Khushab
Kundian	Town	Mianwali
Kunjah	Town	Gujrat
Kurree	Village	Gujrat
Kuthiala Sheikhan	Town	Mandi Bahauddin
Kutruwal	Town	
== L ==
Ladian	Village	Gujrat
Lahore	Capital	Lahore
Lakhani, Punjab	Town	Dera Ghazi Khan
Lalamusa	City	Gujrat
Laleka	Town	Bahawalnagar
Lalewala	Village	
Lalian	City	Chiniot
Lawa, Punjab	City	Talagang
Lapiwala	Town	Bhakkar
Lawrencepur, Punjab, Pakistan	Town	Attock
Layyah	City	Layyah
Lehr Sultanpur	Village	Chakwal
Lehri, Jhelum	Village	Jhelum
Leti, Punjab	Village	Chakwal
Liaqauatpur	City	Rahim Yar Khan
Lilla, Jhelum	Village	Jhelum
Lodhran	City	Lodhran
Lolianwali	Village	Mandi Bahauddin
Longo, Pakistan	Village	
Lopoke	Village	
Lumbri	Village	
Luni (Punjab)	Village	
== M ==
Mabbuke	Village	
Madu Kalas	Village	Jhelum
Mahay Chattha	Village	Gujranwala
Mahrawali	Village	
Mahtaman	Village	
Mailsi	City	Vehari
Makerwal	Village	Mianwali
Makwal Kalan	Town	Dera Ghazi Khan
Mal Awan	Village	Rawalpindi
Malakwal	City	Mandi Bahauddin
Malana Dagar	Village	
Malhu	Locality	Jhelum
Mali Singh	Village	
Malikpur, Gujrat	Village	Gujrat
Malikwal Tehsil	Village	Mandi Bahauddin
Malikwal	Village	Mandi Bahauddin
Malka, Pakistan	Town	Gujrat
Mallu-Chhitt	Village	Sialkot
Malot	Village	Jhelum
Mamoori	Town	Dera Ghazi Khan
Mana Ahmadani	Town	Dera Ghazi Khan
Manak	Town	Lahore
Manakpur	Village	
Mananwala	City	Sheikhupura
Mandeer	Town	Gujrat
Mandi Bahauddin	City	Mandi Bahauddin
Mandranwala	Village	Sialkot
Mangat, Pakistan	Town	Mandi Bahauddin
Mangewala	Town	Layyah
Manghrotha	Town	Dera Ghazi Khan
Manglia	Village	Gujrat
Mangrotha	Town	Dera Ghazi Khan
Mangtanwala	Town	Nankana Sahib
Manhala	Town	Lahore
Mangwal	Village	Chakwal
Mansar, Pakistan	Town	Attock
Mansuwala	Village	
Manuri	Village	
Mari Shah Sakhira	Town	Jhang
Mardwal	Village	Khushab
Mari Waraichan	Village	Gujrat
Mari, Punjab	Village	Mianwali
Marot	City	Bahawalnagar
Maruf (Okara)	Town	Okara
Matore	Village	Rawalpindi
Matta, Punjab	Town	Kasur
Matta, Punjab	Village	Kasur
Mauza Sulemaan	Village	Chiniot
Mehmood Kot	Town	Multan
Mehraywala	Town	Rajanpur
Mera Jaffar	Village	
Mian Channu	City	Khanewal
Miana Chak	Town	Gujrat
Miani, Chakwal	Village	Chakwal
Mianwal	Town	Mandi Bahauddin
Mianwala	Village	
Mianwala Kariya	Town	Bahawalpur
Mianwali Bangla	City	Sialkot
Mianwali	Capital	Mianwali
Minchinabad	City	Bahawalnagar
Miranpur, Punjab	Town	Lahore
Mirbaz	Village	Sahiwal
Mirpur Khas	Capital	Mirpur Khas
Mirza Tahir, Punjab	Village	Gujrat
Mithankot	City	
Mochh	Town	Mianwali
Mohra Awan	Village	Chakwal
Mohra Noori	Town	Rawalpindi
Momanpur, Pakistan	Village	Attock
Mona Punjab	Village	Sargodha
Monan, Punjab	Village	Jhelum
Mong, Punjab	Town	Mandi Bahauddin
Morejhangi	Town	Dera Ghazi Khan
Motian	Village	Jhelum
Mudke Dhariwal	Town	Kasur
Mughalabad	Village	Jhelum
Muhammadgarh, Pakistan	Town	Bahawalpur
Muhib Ali Uttar	Town	Okara
Mulhal Mughlan	Village	Chakwal
Mullanwali	Town	Bhakkar
Multan Khurd	Village	Talagang
Multan	City	Multan
Mulwal	Village	
Mumbar	Village	
Mumbhar	Village	
Munara	Village	Chakwal
Mundayki	Town	Kasur
Murala	Town	Mandi Bahauddin
Mureed	Village	Chakwal
Muridke	City	Sheikhupura
Musa, Pakistan	Village	Attock
Mustafaabad (Dullewala) District Bhakkar	Village	Bhakkar
Mutafariq Chahan	Town	Dera Ghazi Khan
Muzafarpur Janubi	Village	Mianwali
Muzafarpur Shumali	Village	Mianwali
Muzaffargarh	Capital	Muzaffargarh
Muzaffargarh	City	Muzaffargarh
== N ==
Nachindi	Village	Chakwal
Nagial, Jhelum	Village	Jhelum
Nain, Punjab	Town	Mandi Bahauddin
Nainwal Khalsa	Village	
Najabat	Village	
Najwaniwala	Town	Bahawalpur
Naka Kahoot	Village	Chakwal
Nakka Kalan	Village	Jhelum
Nakka Khurd	Village	Jhelum
Nali Shumali	Village	Khushab
Namal	Town	Mianwali
Nanaksar	Village	Toba Tek Singh
Nandwal	Village	Gujrat
Nankana Sahib	City	Nankana Sahib
Nara Matore	Village	Rawalpindi
Nara, Jhelum	Village	Jhelum
Nārag	Town	Chakwal
Narang Mandi	City	Seikhupura
Nartopa	City	Attock
Nari Shumali	Town	Dera Ghazi Khan
Nari, Punjab	Village	Khushab
Narowal	City	Narowal
Naseer Pur Kalan	Village	Sargodha
Naserke	Village	Gurdaspur
Nathoki	Town	Kasur
Naushera, Punjab	Town	Khushab
Nawan	Town	Dera Ghazi Khan
Noonanwali	Town	Gujrat
Noor Pur Baghan	Village	Jhelum
Noor Pur Sayedan	Village	Jhelum
Noorpur, Chakwal	Village	Chakwal
Noorpur, Punjab	City	Khushab
Notak Bhakkar	Town	Bhakkar
Notak	Town	Bhakkar
== O ==
Odherwal	Village	Chakwal
Okara, Pakistan	Capital	Okara
Okara, Pakistan	City	Okara
Okhali Mohlah	Village	Khushab
Orara	Town	Kasur
== P ==
Padshahan	Village	Chakwal
Paharewala	Village	
Pahrianwali	Town	Mandi Bahauddin
Paigah, Punjab	Town	Dera Ghazi Khan
Paikhel	Town	Mianwali
Pail Bane Khan	Village	Jhelum
Paira	Village	
Pakpattan	Capital	Pakpattan
Palia	Village	
Pandori, Jhelum	Village	Jhelum
Panjan Kissana	Town	Gujrat
Panjar	Village	Rawalpindi
Panwan	Village	Nankana Sahib
Pasrur Tehsil	Village	Sialkot
Pasrur	City	Sialkot
Patalian	Village	
Pathan Walla	Village	Lodhran
Pattoki	City	Kasur
Pawawala	Village	
Pelowaince	Village	Khushab
Phadiara	Town	Lahore
Phool Nagar	City	Kasur
Phularwan	City	Sargodha
Phularwan	Village	Sargodha
Phulliani	Town	Kasur
Phulrey Sydan	Village	Jhelum
Pial Kalan	Town	Kasur
Pichnand	Village	Chakwal
Piera Fatehial	Village	Chakwal
Pind Matay Khan	Village	Jhelum
Pind Rahim Shah	Village	Sargodha
Pind Ranjha	Village	Sargodha
Pind Dadan Khan	City	Jhelum
Pindi Bahauddin	Town	Mandi Bahauddin
Pindi Bhattian	City	Hafi z abad
Pindi Saidpur	Town	Jhelum
Pindi Saidpur	Village	Jhelum
Pindsultani	Village	Attock
Pipli Jhelum	Village	Jhelum
Pir Adil	Town	Dera Ghazi Khan
Pir Jand	Village	Gujrat
Pir Mahal	City	Toba Tek Singh
Pirwal	Village	
Pollard Kot	Town	Lahore
Puna, Pakistan	Village	
Purana Bhalwal	Village	Sargodha
== Q ==
Qadirabad	City	Mandi Bahauddin
Qadirpur Ran	Town	Multan
Qaim Bharwana	Town	Jhang
Qaimpur	City	Bahawalpur
Qasba Gujrat	Town	Muzaffargarh
Qasimabad, Punjab	Town	Sahiwal
Qasimka	Village	Bahawalnagar
Qila Mihan Singh	Town	Gujranwala
Qila Sobha Singh	Town	Narowal
Qila Sura Singh	Village	
Qureshian	Town	Mianwali
== R ==
Rabwah	City	Chiniot
Rafiq Villas	Town	Kasur
Rahdari	Village	Khushab
Rahim Yar Khan District	Village	Rahim Yar Khan
Rahim Yar Khan	City	Rahim Yar Khan
Rahna	Village	
Raisanwala	Village	
Raiwind	Town	Lahore
Raja Jang	Town	Kasur
Raja Village	Village	Gujranwala
Rajanpur	City	Rajanpur
Rajar, Khushab	Village	Khushab
Rajowal Nau	Town	Kasur
Ramin, Punjab	Town	Dera Ghazi Khan
Rampur, Punjab	Town	Lahore
Rana Colony	Town	Gujranwala
Randian, Pakistan	Town	Toba Tek Singh
Rangewala	Village	
Rangpur, Punjab	Town	Khushab
Ranjhe	Village	
Ransial	Village	
Rashiana	Village	Toba Tek Singh
Rasool Pur	Village	Gujrat
Rasool Pur	Village	Khairpur
Rasool Pur	Village	Rajanpur
Rasul, Punjab	Town	Mandi Bahauddin
Rathor, Pakistan	Village	
Ratta Matta	Town	Jhang
Ratta, Punjab	Village	
Rawalpindi	City	Rawalpindi
Rehmanabad	Village	Chakwal
Renala Khurd	City	Okara
Risalapur	Town	
Roda, Punjab	Village	Khushab
Rodasar	Town	Lahore
Rodu Sultan	Town	Jhang
Rohilanwali	Town	Muzaffargarh
Rojhan	City	Rajanpur
Rokhri	Town	Mianwali
Roulia	Village	Gujrat
Rupal, Punjab	Village	
Rupwal	Town	Chakwal
Rurala Road	Town	Faisalabad
Rurki	Town	Lahore
== S ==
Sarai Alamgir	Village	Gujrat
Sadda, Punjab	Town	Sialkot
Sadhoke	City	Gujranwala
Sadiqabad	City	Rahim Yar Khan
Safdarabad	City	Sheikhupura
Saghar	Village	Chakwal
Sahgalabad	Town	Chakwal
Sahibnagar	Town	Lahore
Sahiwal, Sargodha	City	Sargodha
Sahiwal	City	Sahiwal
Sahna	Town	Mandi Bahauddin
Sambrial	Town	Sialkot
Samina, Punjab	Town	Dera Ghazi Khan
Samundri	City	Faisalabad
Samunpur	Village	Mandi Bahauddin
Samote	Town	Kallar Syedan
Sandhilianwali	Town	Toba Tek Singh
Sandral	Village	Khushab
Sanghoi	Village	Jhelum
Sanghoi Khas	Village	Jhelum
Sangla Hill	City	Nankana Sahib
Saral, Chakwal	Village	Chakwal
Sargodha	City	Sargodha
Saroba Punjab	Village	Jhelum
Saroi	Village	Lahore
Saroke	Town	Gujranwala
Satgarah Okara	Town	Okara
Satghara	Town	Okara
Satiana	Town	Faisalabad
Sattoke	Town	
Sauwal	Village	Jhelum
Sawans-Mianwali	Village	Mianwali
Sawer, Pakistan	Village	
Sehjra	Town	Kasur
Sehna	Town	Gujrat
Sehwan Sharif	City	Jamshoro
Shadia, Punjab	Town	Mianwali
Shah Nikdur	Town	Sargodha
Shah Purah	Village	Nankana Sahib
Shah Rukan e Alam	Town	Multan
Shah Sadar Din	Town	Dera Ghazi Khan
Shaheedanwali	Village	Mandi Bahauddin
Shahpur, Punjab	City	Sargodha
Shahpur, Punjab	City	Sargodha
Shakargarh	City	Narowal
Shamaspur	Village	Jhelum
Shamsabad, Pakistan	Village	Attock
Sharaqpur	Town	Sheikhupura
Sheikhupura	Capital	Sheikhupura
Sheikhupura	City	Sheikhupura
Sher Shah, Multan	Town	Multan
Sherewala	Village	
Shikar pur, Bhakkar	Town	Bhakkar
Shinka	Village	Attock
Shorkot	City	Jhang
Shujabad	City	Multan
Sialkot	City	
Sikandar Pura	Village	Kasur
Sikaryali	Town	Gujrat
Sikhanwala	Town	Sahiwal
Sillanwali	Town	Sargodha
Singh Khalsa	Town	Lahore
Sluice, Pakistan	Village	
Sodhi Bala	Village	Khushab
Sodhra	Town	Gujranwala
Sodian Gujar	Village	Jhelum
Sohan	Village	Jhelum
Sohawa	Town	Jhelum
Sohianwala	Village	
Sokar, Punjab	Town	Dera Ghazi Khan
Sujowali	Village	
Sukhochak	Town	
Sultan Khel	Village	Mianwali
Sultanpur, Jhelum	Village	Jhelum
Surajpur, Pakistan	Town	Faisalabad
Swans, Punjab	Village	Mianwali
== T ==
Talwandi	Town	Kasur
Tandlianwala	City	Faisalabad
Tangowali	Village	
Tanikhel	Town	Mianwali
Tank, Pakistan	Capital	Tank
Tapyala	Village	Narowal
Taran Taran, Pakistan	Village	
Targa, Kasur	Village	Kasur
Targa, Sialkot	Village	Sialkot
Targarh	Village	Lahore
Taunsa Sharif	City	Dera Ghazi Khan
Taxila (modern)	City	Rawalpindi
Tehi	Village	Chakwal
Tekgarh	Village	
Thakra	Village	Rawalpindi
Thamewali	Town	Mianwali
Thatha Shamsa (Chattha)	Village	Hafizabad
Thatha shamsa	Village	Hafizabad
Thatta Jhamb	Village	Chiniot
Thatta, Punjab	Town	Attock
Thikrian	Village	Gujrat
Thoa Mehram Khan	Village	Chakwal
Thutha Rai Bahadar	Town	Gujrat
Tibba Mehrban Shah	Village	Mianwali
Tibbi Qaisrani	Town	Dera Ghazi Khan
Tilloker	Village	Khushab
Tirathpur	Town	Sahiwal
Toba Qalandar Shah	Town	Bahawalnagar
Toba Tek Singh	City	Toba Tek Singh
Tobah	Village	Jhelum
Tola Bhangi Khel	Town	Mianwali
Trag	Village	Mianwali
Tuman Leghari	Town	Dera Ghazi Khan
Tuman Qaisrani	Town	Dera Ghazi Khan
== U ==
Uchalli	Village	Khushab
Usman Wala	City	Kasur
Utra Janubi	Village	Khushab
== V ==
Vanjari, Punjab	Town	Mianwali
Vehari Tehsil	Village	Vehari
Vehari	City	Vehari
Vichvin Bala	Town	Mianwali
== W ==
Wadala Sandhuan	Town	Sialkot
Wadore	Town	Dera Ghazi Khan
Wah Cantonment	City	Rawalpindi
Waheer	Village	Khushab
Walana	Village	
Wan Adhen	Town	Kasur
Wan Khara	Town	Kasur
Wan Radha Ram	Town	Kasur
Wan, Pakistan	Village	Sialkot
Wara Alam Shah	Town	Mandi Bahauddin
Warburton, Punjab, Pakistan	Town	Nankana Sahib
Warcha	Village	Khushab
Warwal	Village	Chakwal
Wasu, Punjab	Town	Mandi Bahauddin
Watta Khel	Village	Mianwali
Wazirabad	City	Gujranwala
== Y ==
Yaru Khel	Village	Mianwali
Yazman	City	Bahawalpur
== Z ==
Zafarke	Town	Kasur
Zafarwal	City	Narowal
Zaffer Abad Noon	Village	Sargodha
Zāhir Pīr	City	Rahim Yar Khan
Zira Nawan	Village	
Zhob	City	Zhob Baluchistan
Ziarat	City	Ziarat Baluchistan
