= Mamuri =

Mamuri (Persian: معموري) may refer to:

- Mamuri, Fazl, Nishapur County, Razavi Khorasan Province, Iran
- Mamuri, Mazul, Nishapur County, Razavi Khorasan Province, Iran
- Mamoori, Pakistan
