= Rangewala =

- Location within Pakistan
- Coordinates: 30.49°N 74.15°E
- Country: Pakistan
- Province: Punjab
- Elevation: 180 m (590 ft)

Population
  - Estimate: 55,057
- Time zone: UTC+5 (PST)

Rangewala is a village in the Punjab province of Pakistan. It is located at 30°49'20N 74°15'40E at an altitude of 252 metres (830 feet). The approximate population within the surrounding 7 km is 55,057 persons.

Nearby towns include Najabat and Bohge.
