= Jayya =

Village in Mandi Bahauddin, Punjab, Pakistan

Coordinates: 32°31′55″N 73°23′0″E

Jayya also known as Jayya Sharif (Punjabi and Urdu: جیہ) is a village of Mandi Bahauddin District in the Punjab province of Pakistan. It has the postal code 50471 and is situated approximately 14 kilometers from Mandi Bahauddin, and around 3 kilometers southeast of Chhimmon.

Jayya can be reached by the Sargodha Road and then following the Chimon Sahna Road from King Road. After getting close to the village, there are two access roads to it. One diverts from Rohi Wala stop while the other from Dera Fateh Muhammad. The former enters from the east of the village while the later from the west.

The village has an area of around 6.5 square kilometers and the main source of economy is agriculture and related services. In addition, some residents of the village provide services in different national and international areas, serving as a secondary economic source.

The main crops cultivated in the village are sugar cane, rice, and wheat, with cattle farming can be seen all around the village.

The literacy rate of the village is not very good and comparatively less than the country's literacy rate. It has one elementary school for boys and a primary school for girls. It has also two private secondary schools

The village is represented by two headmen, (Muhammed Hayat and Muhammad Amin), who are representatives of the Provincial Revenue Department, and both reside on the eastern access road of the village.

Jayya has a rich source of renewable energy in the form of biogas and solar energy. Some of the residents have initiated self-financed projects to harness these resources.
