= Mansuwala =

- Location within Pakistan
- Coordinates: 30.46°N 74.13°E
- Country: Pakistan
- Province: Punjab
- Elevation: 176 m (577 ft)
- Time zone: UTC+5 (PST)

Mansuwala is a village in the Punjab province of Pakistan. It is located at 30°46'50N 74°13'10E with an altitude of 176 metres (580 feet).
