= Chak No. 3 =

Coordinates: 32°32′59″N 73°25′02″E

Chak No. 3 is a village in Mandi Bahauddin District of the Punjab province of Pakistan. It is located in Phalia Tehsil of the district.
