= Nachindi =

Nachindi is a village in of Chakwal District of Punjab province in Pakistan. It is part of the Union Council Jand Khanzada in Chakwal Tehsil. The population of Nachindi is about 4249. A large percentage of the population works for the Pakistan Army and other defence-related departments.

== Geography ==
It is located at 32°57′0″N 73°9′0″E, and has an elevation of 450 metres (1479 feet).
