= Pir Adil =

- Union council and town
- Location in Pakistan
- Coordinates: 30°11′0″N 70°44′0″E
- Country: Pakistan
- Province: Punjab
- District: Dera Ghazi Khan District
- Elevation: 390 ft (119 m)
- Time zone: UTC+5 (PST)
  - Summer (DST): +6

Pir Adil is a town and union council of Dera Ghazi Khan District in the Punjab province of Pakistan. It is located at 30°10'60N 70°43'60E and has an altitude of 119 metres (393 feet).
