= Darkhast Jamal Khan =

- Union council and town
- Location in Pakistan
- Coordinates: 29°41′50″N 70°28′20″E
- Country: Pakistan
- Province: Punjab
- District: Dera Ghazi Khan District
- Elevation: 367 ft (112 m)
- Time zone: UTC+5 (PST)
  - Summer (DST): +6

Darkhast Jamal Khan is a town and union council of Dera Ghazi Khan District in the Punjab province of Pakistan. It is located at 29°41'50N 70°28'20E and has an altitude of 112 metres (370 feet).

== Basti Zahrani ==
Basti Zahrani is a small village located within Darkhast Jamal Khan, in the Dera Ghazi Khan District, Punjab, Pakistan. The village is known for its serene environment, close-knit community, and agricultural lifestyle.

The residents of Basti Zahrani are primarily from the Zahrani caste, which traces its lineage to the Al-Zahrani tribe — an ancient Arab Zahran tribe from the Zahran lineage of the Hejaz region, currently part of modern-day Saudi Arabia. The Zahrani people are believed to have migrated and settled in this area generations ago, preserving elements of Arab cultural heritage.
