= Targarh =

Pakistani village

- Location within Pakistan
- Coordinates: 31.36°N 74.16°E
- Country: Pakistan
- Province: Punjab
- Elevation: 197 m (646 ft)
- Time zone: UTC+5 (PST)

Targarh is a village located in Punjab (Pakistan). It is located in Lahore District at 31°36'44N 74°16'51E with an altitude of 197 metres (649 feet), and lies to the north-west of Lahore city.
