= Kot Abbas Pura =

- Village
- Location within Pakistan
- Coordinates: 30°56′56″N 73°44′36″E
- Country: Pakistan
- Province: Punjab
- District: Kasur
- Time zone: UTC+5 (PST)

Kot Abbas Pura is a small village located on the periphery of village Behrwaal (Pattoki) near the thana (police station) at Sarai Mughal (Mughal's Inn). This village has a population of almost 100 people.

There has been the classic system of "Punchayat" (informal legal courts) being administered by a Landlord Malik Mumtaz Hussain Awan. This system of punchayat is an ages-old method of delivering speedy and less-expensive justice in South Asia. But with the advent of rapid urbanization, of even small towns in South Asia, the system of formal courts constituted by the state government is replacing this old mode of trial.

On the economic side, sugar cane, wheat, rice, cotton, maize and other fruits and vegetables are grown here.
