= Targa, Sialkot =

Targa
- Location within Pakistan
- Coordinates: 32.21°N 74.29°E
- Country: Pakistan
- Province: Punjab
- Elevation: 240 m (790 ft)
- Time zone: UTC+5 (PST)

Targa is a village in Sialkot District, in the Punjab province of Pakistan.
