= Rathor, Pakistan =

Rathor
- Location within Pakistan
- Coordinates: 30.52°N 74.17°E
- Country: Pakistan
- Province: Punjab
- Elevation: 178 m (584 ft)
- Time zone: UTC+5 (PST)

Rathor is a village in the Punjab province. It is located at 30°52'30N 74°17'50E with an altitude of 178 metres (587 feet).
