= Notak Bhakkar =

Notak (Urdu: نوتک), is a town and Union Council of Bhakkar District in the Punjab province of Pakistan.
