= Qureshian =

Coordinates: 31°22′N 72°41′E

- Town and union council
- Interactive map of Qureshian
- Country: Pakistan
- Region: Punjab
- District: Mianwali District
- Time zone: UTC+5 (PST)

Qureshian is a town and union council, an administrative subdivision, of Mianwali District in the Punjab province of Pakistan. It is part of Mianwali Tehsil.
