= Gop-e-Rah =

- Village
- Location within Pakistan
- Coordinates: 30°56′56″N 73°44′36″E
- Country: Pakistan
- Province: Punjab
- District: Kasur
- Time zone: UTC+5 (PST)

Chak No.42 Gop-e-Rah is a small village located in Kasur District, Punjab, Pakistan.

Gop-e-Rai (name of a Hindu landlord from Lahore) chak no. 42 is a small village almost eight kilometers from Pattoki Tehsil. It consists of two portions; one is called Gop-e-Rai and other is called Niaz Baig, named after two joint villages at Lahore. It was established during the early 20th century, ranging from 1905 to 1920, by the English rulers for cultivation purposes. Most of the people migrated there from the Lahore suburbs. As the land of this village is very fertile, most of the people from this village are related to agriculture. The population of Gop-e-rai is approximately 300 houses. Many young people have moved to cities for better education and career opportunities and are no longer doing agricultural work. The main tribes are Mangan, Ghumman, Chhina, Arain, sansi, [Sial], and Gill.
