= Drahma, Punjab =

Town in Punjab, Pakistan

Drahma درہما
- Union council and town
- Location of Drahma Drahma (Pakistan)
- Coordinates: 30°13′N 70°6′E
- Country: Pakistan
- Province: Punjab
- District: Dera Ghazi Khan
- Tehsil: Dera Ghazi Khan
- Number of Union Councils: Drahma
- Time zone: UTC+05:00 (Pakistan Standard Time)
- Postal code type: 32200
- Calling code: 064

Drahma (Urdu:درہما) is a town and union council of Dera Ghazi Khan District in the Punjab province of Pakistan.
