= Kantrila =

Kantrilla, Jhelum
- Village
- Location in Pakistan
- Coordinates: 32°57′36″N 73°41′39″E
- Country: Pakistan
- Region: Punjab Province
- District: Jhelum District
- Elevation: 243 m (797 ft)
- Time zone: UTC+5 (PST)
- Postal code: 49490
- Area code: 0544

Kantrila (Urdu, Punjabi: کنتریلە) is a village of Jhelum District in the Punjab Province of Pakistan. It is part of Jhelum Tehsil, and is located at 32°57′36″N 73°41′39″E and has an altitude of 243 metres (797 feet).
