= Arjun Singhwali =

- Location within Pakistan
- Coordinates: 30.46°N 74.11°E
- Country: Pakistan
- Province: Punjab
- District: Okara
- Tehsil: Depalpur
- Elevation: 180 m (590 ft)
- Time zone: UTC+5 (PST)

Arjun Singhwali is a village of Okara District in the Punjab province of Pakistan. It is located in the east of the district near the Indian border at 30°46'50N 74°11'0E with an altitude of 180 metres (593 feet).
