= Pawawala =

- Location within Pakistan
- Coordinates: 30.55°N 70.52°E
- Country: Pakistan
- Province: Punjab
- Elevation: 134 m (440 ft)
- Time zone: UTC+5 (PST)

Pawawala is a village in the Punjab of Pakistan. It is located at 30°55'40N 70°52'5E with an altitude of 134 metres (442 feet).
