= Gobindsar =

- Interactive map of Gobindsar
- Country: India
- Elevation: 171 m (561 ft)

Gobindsar is a town located in the Punjab province of India.
