= Pipli Jhelum =

Coordinates: 32.6780°N 73.3645°E

Pipli, Jhelum is a village in union council Daulatpur of Jhelum District in the Punjab province of Pakistan. It is part of P. D. Khan Tehsil, and is located at 32° 40' 40N 73° 21' 55E with an altitude of 206 metres (676 ft).

== School ==
It has one Government girls' primary school and one Government boys' middle (Elementary) school. It was a Unicef model village.
