= Panwan =

Pakistani village

Panwan پنواں
- Town
- Location in Pakistan
- Coordinates: 31.588075°N 73.596218°E
- Country: Pakistan
- Province: Punjab
- District: Nankana Sahib

Panwan' (Urdu: پنواں) is a town in Tehsil Shahkot in the Nankana Sahib District, Punjab, Pakistan, on the Lahore - Sheikhupura - Faisalabad Road.
