= Kot Haibat =

- Union council and town
- Location in Pakistan
- Coordinates: 30°6′N 70°37′E
- Country: Pakistan
- Province: Punjab
- District: Dera Ghazi Khan District
- Elevation: 407 ft (124 m)
- Time zone: UTC+5 (PST)
  - Summer (DST): +6

Kot Haibat is a town and union council of Dera Ghazi Khan District in the Punjab province of Pakistan. It is located at 30°6'0N 70°37'0E and has an altitude of 124 metres (410feet).
