= Sherewala =

- Interactive map of Sherewala
- Coordinates: 30.47°N 74.14°E
- Country: India
- Province: Punjab
- Elevation: 178 m (584 ft)
- Time zone: UTC+5 (PST)

Sherewala is a village in the Punjab state in India. It is located at 30°47'0N 74°14'15E with an altitude of 178 metres (587 feet).
