= Mallu-Chhitt =

Village in Pakistan

Mallu Chhitt is a village in Syedanwali union council of Sialkot District in the Punjab province of Pakistan. It is the largest village of the union council.
