= Kot Mubarak =

Kot Mubarak kot Mubarak
- Union council and town of dera Ghazi Khan )-->
- kot Mubarak
- Nickname: batil
- Location in Pakistan
- Coordinates: 31°13′35″N 70°28′30″E
- Country: Pakistan
- Province: Punjab
- District: Dera Ghazi Khan District
- Elevation: 663 ft (202 m)
- Time zone: UTC+5 (PST)
  - Summer (DST): +6
- Website: https://www.facebook.com/Kot.MubarakDGKhan

Kot Mubarak is a town and union council of Dera Ghazi Khan District in the Punjab province of Pakistan. It is located at 31°13'35N 70°28'30E and has an altitude of 202 metres (666 feet).
