= Dhudhi Phapra =

Dhudhi Phapra ڈھڈی پھپھرہ
- Village
- Location in Pakistan
- Coordinates: 32°35′57″N 72°57′10″E
- Country: Pakistan
- Province: Punjab
- District: Jhelum

Population
  - Total: 1,800
- Time zone: UTC+5 (PST)

Dhudhi Phapra (Urdu:ڈھڈی پھپھرہ) is a village and union council of Jhelum District in the Punjab Province of Pakistan. It is part of Pind Dadan Khan Tehsil.
