= Arainabad =

Coordinates: 32°38′48″N 73°15′16″E

Arain Abad is a village of Jhelum District in the Punjab Province of Pakistan.

It is located near the town of Chak Shadi and is a part of Pind Dadan Khan Tehsil, and is located at 32°38'48"N 73°15'16"E with an altitude of 206 metres (679 feet).
