= Kallur, Mianwali =

Coordinates: 32°44′33″N 71°15′54″E

Kallur Sharif, Punjabكلُّورشریف
- Town and union council
- Interactive map of Kallur Sharif, Punjabكلُّورشریف
- Country: Pakistan
- Region: Punjab
- District: Mianwali District
- Time zone: UTC+5 (PST)

Kallur Sharif (Urdu: كلُّورشریف) is a town and union council of Mianwali District in the Punjab province of Pakistan. It is part of Isakhel Tehsil and is located at 32°44'33N 71°15'54E and has an altitude of 203 m (669 ft).

In some years, the area is occasionally affected by some flooding during the monsoons.
