= Angakiri =

Angakiri is a small village situated about 4 kilometers from Vehari District on Hasilpur road which is also known as Ludden road. Its name Angakiri is due to the name of a village situated in India. People migrated from that village at the time of partition in 1947 to Pakistan inhabited that town so named Angakiri. Population is about 1000 people.

== Name origin ==
Angakiri is atypical word of Punjabi its meaning is as follows: Anga means red or naked, and Kiri means Ant, insect, a special species of ant with red head. This name is related to some old folks in which this ant brought gold from under ground in that village of angakiri. the true and complete story is unknown.

== Area ==
Residential and small town also agricultural.

Also have some plant farms as well some of them include Haji Arshad's Plant farm and Ch. Mudassar's Plant farm
