= Mera Jaffar =

Village in Islamabad, Pakistan

Mera Jaffar is a small village in Maira Sumbal Jaffar, near Golra Sharif, Islamabad, Pakistan. It is located in the sector f12 Islamabad. There are some famous market like Malik Shaukat Market, Aslam Market, Maalik Market. The locals are living before the independence.
