= Nainwal Khalsa =

Nainwal Khalsa Nainwala
- Village
- Location in Pakistan
- Coordinates: 30°53′59.9994″N 74°1′6.0″E
- Country: Pakistan
- Province: Punjab
- Time zone: UTC+5 (PKT)

Nainwal Khalsa is a small village located in the Punjab region of Pakistan.

== Location ==
Nainwal Khalsa is located roughly 16 miles (26 km) northwest from the border with India, and 61.8 miles (99.5 km) by road southwest from Lahore. The nearest airport is the Allama Iqbal International Airport, 48.6 miles (78.2 km) away.

== Language ==
Punjabi is the native spoken language, but Urdu is also widely understood.
