= Islam Pur Lokari =

- Village
- Location in Pakistan
- Coordinates: 32°11′18″N 73°01′43″E
- Country: Pakistan
- Province: Punjab
- District: Sargodha

Islam Pur Lokari is a small village, situated in the west of Hathiwind, in Sargodha District of Punjab province, Pakistan. The village is part of Khan Muhammad Wala union council. There is a primary school in Islam Pur Lokari.
