= Zira Nawan =

- Location within Pakistan
- Coordinates: 31.08°N 72.42°E
- Country: Pakistan
- Province: Punjab
- Elevation: 252 m (827 ft)
- Time zone: UTC+5 (PST)

Zira Nawan is a village in the Punjab province of Pakistan. It is located at 31°8'7N 72°41'56E, at an altitude of 252 metres (830 feet).
