= Sukhochak =

Town in Pakistan

Sukhochak is a small town in Punjab, Pakistan near the India/Pakistan border.
