= Lumbri =

- Location within Pakistan
- Coordinates: 30.39°N 73.46°E
- Country: Pakistan
- Province: Punjab
- Elevation: 169 m (554 ft)
- Time zone: UTC+5 (PST)

Lumbri is a village in the Punjab province of Pakistan. It is located at 30°39'50N 73°46'30E with an altitude of 169 metres (557 feet).
