= Motian =

Punjab province, Pakistan

Coordinates: 33°01′N 73°43′E

Motian (or Mota Jahangir) is a village in Jhelum District, Punjab province, Pakistan.

== Demographics ==
The population of the village, according to the 2017 census, was 627.
