= Bhoanj =

Village

Coordinates: 32°50′50″N 73°41′30″E

Bhowanj is a village in the Punjab province of Pakistan. It is located at the distance of around 15 km from the city of Jhelum. Bhowanj is located at the banks of Upper Jhelum Canal. Bhowanj is located in a valley between Tilla Jogian mountain range and the hills of Pubbi. The village has a government schools for both boys and girls and there is also a couple of clinics providing medical facilities.

== Demographics ==
The population of village Bhowanj is around 3000 persons with 55% male and 45% female ratio.

== Economy ==
Bhowanj is a rapidly growing village and the expansion is fed by growing number of its residents finding work and doing businesses in other major cities of Pakistan and quite a few of them are living and working in other countries mainly UAE, Kuwait, Qatar, Saudi Arabia, France, United Kingdom, Spain, South Africa and ireland to name a few.

== Transport ==
Bhowanj is very well connected the outside world with a good road connection to the city of Jhelum which is at half an hour drive away. The capital Islamabad can be reached in just over 2 hours through the Grand Trunk Road (GT Road). The nearest airport is Sialkot airport but most of the population prefer Islamabad or Lahore airports for domestic and international travels.
