= Gulzarwala =

- Location within Pakistan
- Coordinates: 30.20°N 70.39°E
- Country: Pakistan
- Province: Punjab
- Elevation: 126 m (413 ft)
- Time zone: UTC+5 (PST)

Gulzarwala is a village of Dera Ghazi Khan District in the Punjab province of Pakistan. It is located at 30°20'50N 70°39'45E lying to the north of the district capital Dera Ghazi Khan - with an altitude of 126 metres (416 feet).
