= Jabairpur =

- Location within Pakistan
- Coordinates: 32°55′23″N 72°53′18″E
- Country: Pakistan
- Province: Punjab
- District: Chakwal
- Elevation: 508 m (1,667 ft)
- Time zone: UTC+5 (PST)

Jabairpur (Urdu:جبیرپور) is a small town and eastern suburb of Chakwal in Chakwal District in the Punjab province of Pakistan.
