= Jamsher Kalan =

- Town
- Location within Pakistan
- Coordinates: 30°56′56″N 73°44′36″E
- Country: Pakistan
- Province: Punjab
- District: Kasur
- Time zone: UTC+5 (PST)

Jamsher Kalan (Urdu: جمشير كلاں), is a town and Union Council of Kasur District in the Punjab province of Pakistan. It is part of Chunian Tehsil and is located at 30°49'0N 74°7'0E with an altitude of 175 metres (577 feet).

Its Nazim is Waqas Tufail Chaudhry and Union Council Secretary is Muhammad Hassan Joya Which belongs to Chunian City. First Numberdaar of Jamsher Kalan was Chaudhry Feroz Din and later on this charge was shifted to Chaudhry Muhammad Tufail who was the only son of Feroz Din.
