= Tekgarh =

- Location within Pakistan
- Coordinates: 30.24°N 72.39°E
- Country: Pakistan
- Province: Punjab
- Elevation: 146 m (479 ft)
- Time zone: UTC+5 (PST)

Tekgarh is a village in the Punjab province of Pakistan. It is located at 30°24'0N 72°39'0E with an altitude of 146 metres (482 feet). The nearest airport is LYP-Faisalabad Intl.
