= Jauharabad-II =

Jauharabad-Ii
- Town and union council
- Country: Pakistan
- Region: Punjab Province
- District: Khushab District
- Time zone: UTC+5 (PST)

Jauharabad-Ii is one of the 51 Union Councils (administrative subdivisions) of Khushab District in the Punjab Province of Pakistan.
