= Saroi =

- Location within Pakistan
- Coordinates: 31.17°N 74.28°E
- Country: Pakistan
- Province: Punjab
- District: Lahore
- Time zone: UTC+5 (PST)

Kalyan is a village of Lahore District in the Punjab province of Pakistan. It is located at 31°17'38N 74°28'41E lying to the south of the capital Lahore with an altitude of 208 metres (682 ft).
