= Sodhi Bala =

Sodhi Bala Herdo Sodhi Bala
- Village
- Interactive map of Sodhi Bala
- Coordinates: 32°29′19″N 72°09′31″E
- Country: Pakistan
- Region: Punjab Province
- District: Khushab District
- Union Council: Kufri
- Tehsil: Naushehra

Area
  - Total: 8.0937 km^{2} (3.1250 sq mi)

Population approx.
  - Total: 5,000
- Time zone: UTC+5 (PST)
- Area code: 0454
- Website: www.sodhibala.khb.com

Sodhi Bala is a village of Khushab District in the Punjab Province of Pakistan, on the Khatwaii to Surakki Jhalar road, 4 km (2.5 mi) from Khatwaii. It is about 47 kilometres (29 mi) distance from district headquarters Jauahrabad and 90 kilometres (56 mi) from divisional headquarters Sargodha.

== Geography ==
There are four natural spring in the village's surroundings. Local mountains include Balochan Wala, Taawaan, Kot Wala Faqir, Ghaban Wali Dandi, Nikky Wala Pahar, and Domali .

Surrounding villages include Jahlar and Paprrali (west), Surraki (north), Pothay and Khurra (east), Chapparr Sharif, and Kawad (south).

== Economy ==
Major crops include wheat, millet, corn, cauliflower, potatoes, tomato, and peppers.

== Infrastructure ==
The village contains two primary school, one for boys and one for girls. There are two mosques (named جامع مسجد and بوہڑوالی مسجد) and a cemetery (named قبرستان).
