= Mehraywala =

Mehraywala is a small town in the north east of the Fazilpur, in the Rajanpur district of Punjab, Pakistan.
