= Samina, Punjab =

Samina sadaat سمیڑہ سادات saminraan
- Union council and town
- Nickname: Saminraa سمینہ سادات/سمینڑہ
- Location in Pakistan
- Coordinates: 30°0′N 70°46′E
- Country: Pakistan
- Province: Punjab
- District: Dera Ghazi Khan District

Area
- 15,000 sq mi (39,000 km^{2})
- Elevation: 371 ft (113 m)
- Time zone: UTC+5 (PST)
  - Summer (DST): +6

Samina sadaat is a town and union council of Dera Ghazi Khan District in the Punjab province of Pakistan probably its name is given on the basis of 2 historical figures as [(Suleman khan sameen)] and [(Syed Abdullah Shah)] as Shah Sahb came in Samina for the sake of dawah and Suleman khan sameen allotted him some land so could live here that is why that place is called Samina Sadat. The town is located on the bank of the Indus River.
