= Pathan Wala =

Village in the Lodhran District of Pakistan

Coordinates: 29°32′0″N 71°37′15″E

Pathan Wala is a small village of Lodhran District in the Punjab province of Pakistan. It is located at 29°32'4"N 71°37'15"E.

The region around Pathan Wala was affected by severe floods in 2010.
