= Chotibala =

Choti Bala
- Union council and town
- choti bala
- Location in Pakistan
- Coordinates: 29°49′0″N 70°15′2″E
- Country: Pakistan
- Province: Punjab
- District: Dera Ghazi Khan District

Government
  - Chief: Wadera Ghulam Yasin Khan Bughlani
- Elevation: 712 ft (217 m)
- Time zone: UTC+5 (PST)
  - Summer (DST): +6

Choti Bala is a town and union council of Dera Ghazi Khan District in the Punjab province of Pakistan. It is located at 29°49'0 N 70°15'0 E and has an altitude of 217 metres (715 feet).

== History of Choti Bala ==
Choti Bala is 50 kilometers away from Dera Ghazi Khan in South West. It is 24 kilometers away from Choti Zereen in west and 23 kilometers away from Sakhi Sarwar in south. It's situated in Koh e Sulaiman mountains. Famous hill station Fort Munro is 30 kilometers away from Choti Bala but there is no proper road. The town was founded probably in 18th century. It was the centre and commercial hub of all native villages. Before partition Hindus were occupying all trades and after their migration locals took over the local trade. Bughalni, Nangri, Qureshi, Bhatti, Bhutta, Waria Gazar and Mir are the major castes settled in Choti Bala.

Choti Bala is rich in fertile land, water is available in abundance here, water level is 20 to 60 feet. Local people here are Bughlani, Nangri, Qureshi, Bhutta, Bhatti and Waria, Gazar and Mir. The native language of the people here is Saraiki.

When it rains on Mount Sulaiman, there are two streams here that give the view of a river. There is a passage of two streams, one is called Mithawin, Choti and the other is Khonkhar, which irrigates the entire area. Its water falls in DG Kanal. Due to lack of bridge, difficulties of the people here increase during rainy days. It is very difficult to cross these streams. Patients and business people get trapped. Lack of education. Due to which most of the population is illiterate.

There is one government high school for boys and middle school for girls. There is one government hospital which is lack of facilities. Mostly people are working in Gulf countries and in military. Other local people earning is depending on agriculture. There is no industary and due to a landlock area people immigration trend towards urban areas is more.
