= Kot Hasan Khan =

- Village
- Location in Punjab Kot Hasan Khan (Pakistan) Kot Hasan Khan (Asia)
- Coordinates: 32°4′N 73°41′E
- Country: Pakistan
- Region: Punjab
- District: Hafizabad District

Population (2017)
  - Total: 8,065
- Time zone: UTC+5 (PST)
  - Summer (DST): UTC+6 (PDT)
- Postal code: 52110
- Area code: 0547
- Website: Punjab Gateway page

Kot Hasan Khan (Urdu: خان حسن ىوٹ) is a village of Hafizabad District, Punjab, Pakistan. It is located in the tehsil of Hafizabad, in the qanungo halqa of Chak Chatha and the patwar circle of Kot Hasan Khan. As of 2017, Kot Hasan Khan has a population of 8,065, in 1,059 households. It is situated at 32° 4′ N. and 73° 41′ E.

Kot Hasan Khan is on Sheikhupura Road near Kassoki, Pakistan.

The 1951 census recorded Kot Hasan Khan as a village in Hafizabad tehsil in Gujranwala District, with a population of 1,710, in 490 households. It covered an area of 6.0 square miles, and it had a primary school.
