= Khakhi =

- Union council and town
- Location in Pakistan
- Coordinates: 30°3′55″N 70°43′30″E
- Country: Pakistan
- Province: Punjab
- District: Dera Ghazi Khan District
- Elevation: 364 ft (111 m)
- Time zone: UTC+5 (PST)
  - Summer (DST): +6

Khakhi is a town and union council of Dera Ghazi Khan District in the Punjab province of Pakistan. It has an altitude of 111 metres (367 feet).
