= Thoa Mehram Khan =

- Village and union council
- Country: Pakistan
- Punjab: Punjab
- District: Talagang
- Time zone: UTC+5 (PST)

Thoa Mehram Khan is a village and union council of Talagang District in the Punjab province of Pakistan.
