= Sawer, Pakistan =

Sawer
- Location within Pakistan
- Coordinates: 33.05°N 72.38°E
- Country: Pakistan
- Province: Punjab
- Elevation: 394 m (1,293 ft)
- Time zone: UTC+5 (PST)

Sawer is a village in the Punjab province of Pakistan. It is located at 33°5'45N 72°38'21E with an altitude of 394 metres (1295 feet).
