= Mutafariq Chahan =

- Town and union council
- Country: Pakistan
- Region: Punjab
- District: Dera Ghazi Khan District
- Time zone: UTC+5 (PST)

Mutafariq Chahan is a town and union council of Dera Ghazi Khan District in the Punjab province of Pakistan.
