= Qasimka =

Settlement in Pakistan

Qasimka is a village and Union Council of Bahawalnagar District in the Punjab province of Pakistan. It is part of Bahawalnagar District.

The village is inhabited mainly by Qasimkas, a subsect of Johiya Rajputs. The village is more than one century old. It was built by and named after Qasim and is situated on the bank of river Sutlej. The village has a hospital and two high schools, both for boys and girls.

Bahawalnagar, Chistian and ArifWala are the closest towns.
