= Rafiq Villas =

Town in Punjab, Pakistan

Kujian Wala Mehar House
- Location within Pakistan
- Coordinates: 31.015308°N 74.512977°E
- Country: Pakistan
- Province: Punjab
- Time zone: UTC+5 (PST)

Rafiq Villas (رفیق والا), formerly known as Kujjianwala, is a small town in Kasur District, Punjab, Pakistan. Rafiq Villas comes under UC 20 Fatoohi wala.

Just before the entrance, there is Pak Cattle Feed factory, a famous company in Pakistan for cattle feed.

== Population ==
The population of this town is almost 5,000.

== Religion ==
There are two Sunni mosques in this town, Ahl-e-Hadis and a Barelvi mosque.

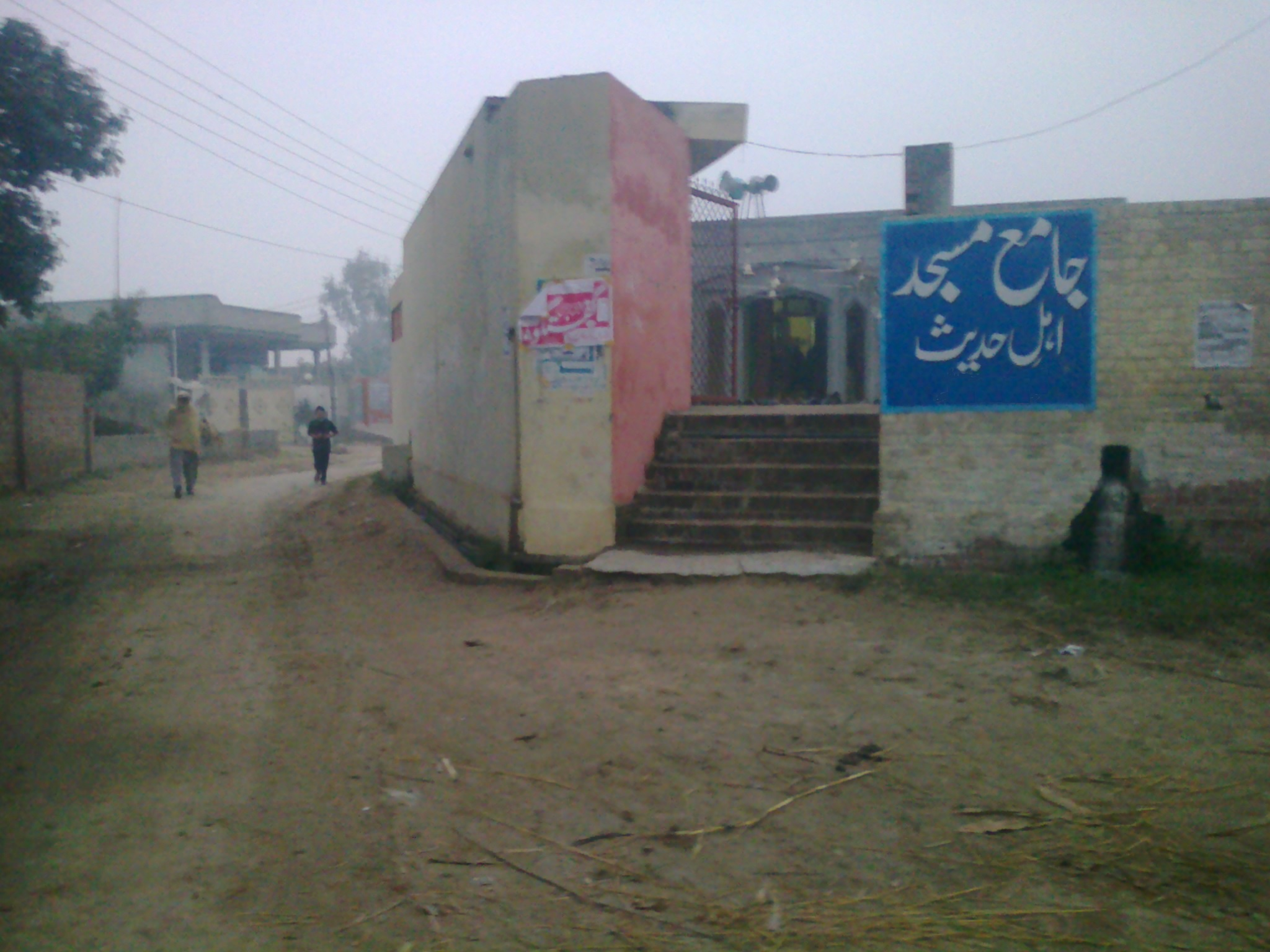
Ahl-e-Hadis Masjid

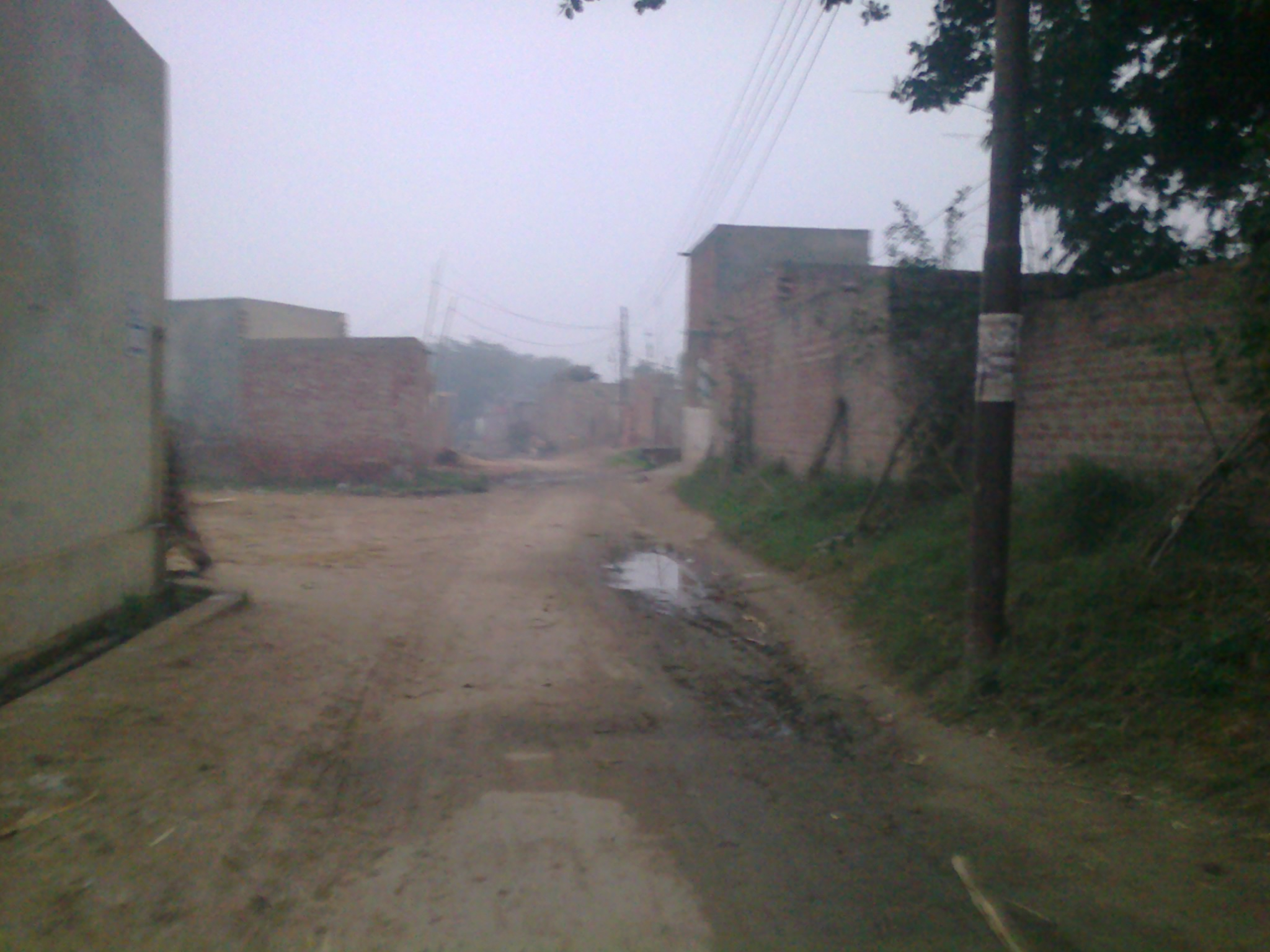
Street view of Rafiq Villas

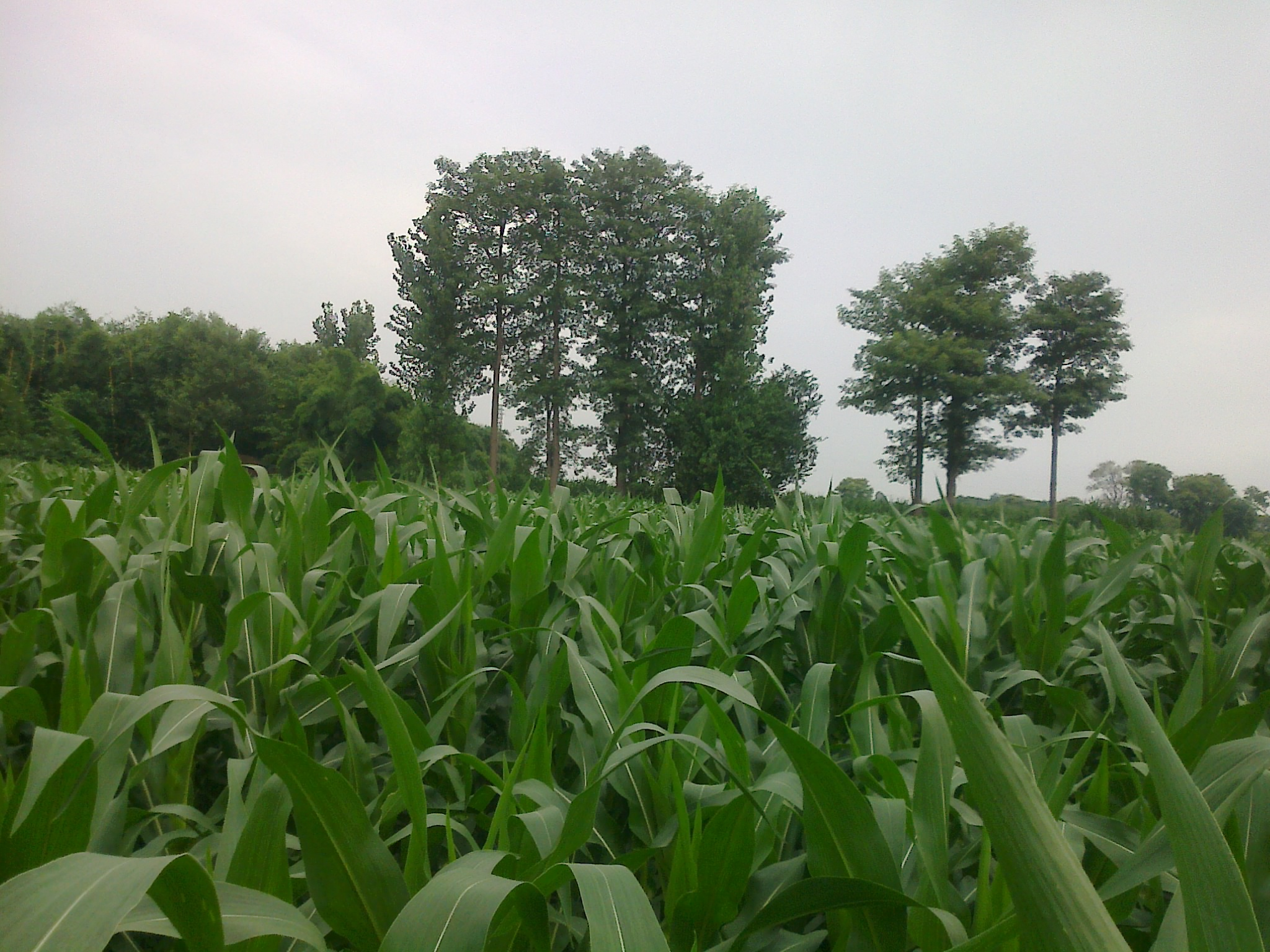
Greenery scene at Rafiq Villas

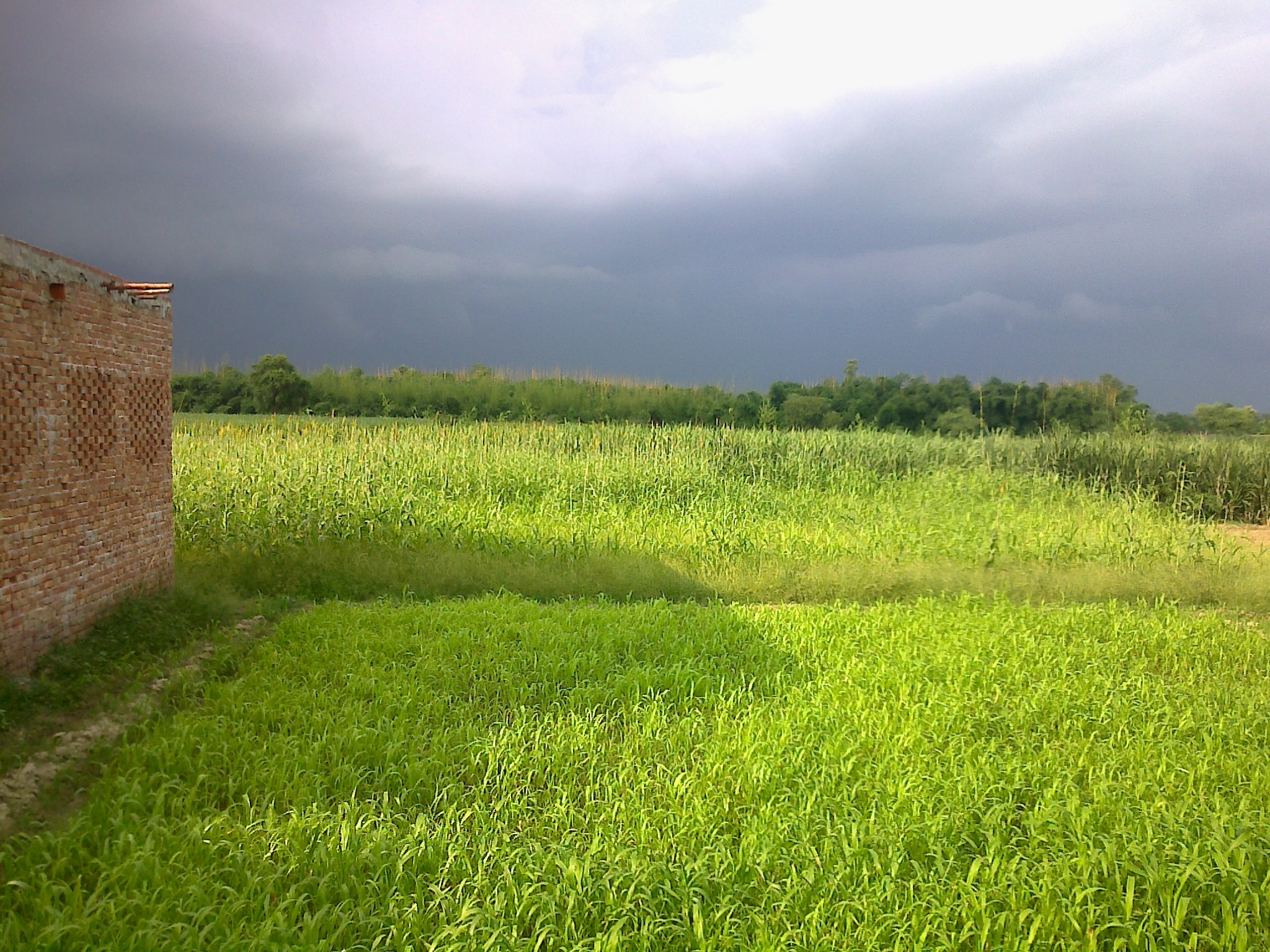
Greenery scene at Rafiq Villas

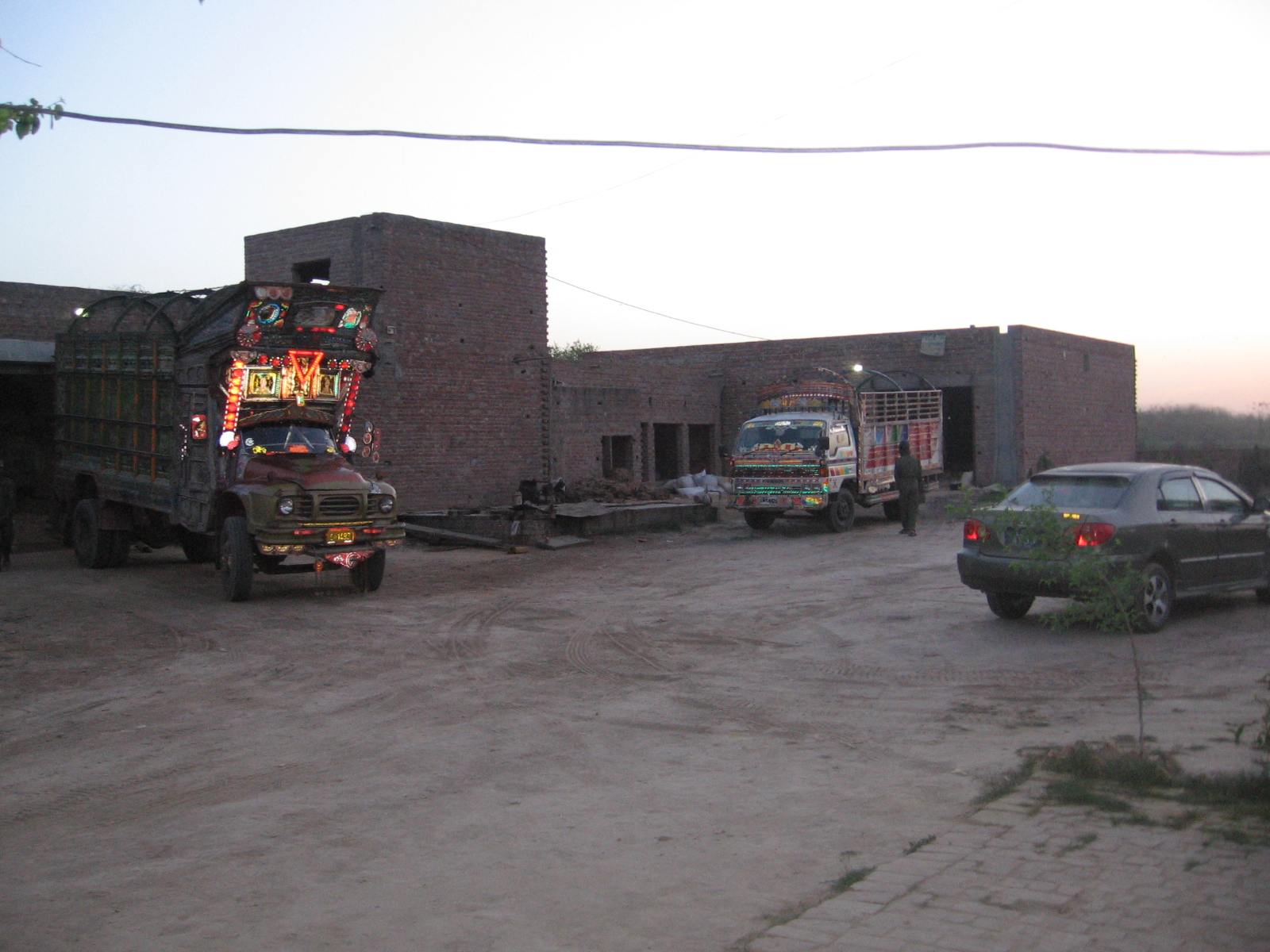
Pak Cattle Feed Factory (Pak Punjnad Wanda)
