= Khinger Kalan =

Coordinates: 33°24′46.22″N 73°05′41.75″E

- Village
- Location within Pakistan
- Country: Pakistan
- Province: Punjab (Pakistan)
- District: Rawalpindi
- Time zone: UTC+5 (PST)

Khinger Kalan is a small village located in Rawalpindi District in Pakistan. It is 34 km to the southwest of Rawalpindi in the Punjab province of Pakistan. Khinger Kalan is home to Bhatti Rajpoot clan. Khinger Kalan is in the Union Council No. 115 of Jhatta Hathial. It is located on the Chak Beli Khan road, which links it to the Nakrrali/Bagh Shangra Road. The village has three mosques and one Govt Primary School.

Most villagers have jobs in the army, education and for private companies and part-time they also undertake farming. Major crops are wheat, maize and mustard, and some people have cows/buffalo at home for milk and other dairy items. Some sell milk to nearby towns.

Major tree are Kakher, Dhraik, Jhand, Phalli and Safada, now the trees are decreasing in surrounding area of Village, in Homes normally fruit trees are planted mostly Lemon, Guava, Apricot etc.
