= Palia, Pakistan =

Village in Punjab, Pakistan

Palia
- Location within Pakistan
- Coordinates: 30.12°N 70.8°E
- Country: Pakistan
- Province: Punjab
- Elevation: 1,056 m (3,465 ft)
- Time zone: UTC+5 (PST)

Palia is a village in the Punjab province of Pakistan. It is located at 30° 12' 15N 70° 8' 48E with an altitude of 1056 metres (3467 feet).
