= Dher Ummed Ali Shah =

Village and union council in Punjab, Pakistan

Coordinates: 32°49′59″N 71°34′28″E

- Village and union council
- Interactive map of Dher Ummed Ali Shah
- Country: Pakistan
- Region: Punjab
- District: Mianwali District

Government
  - Sardar: Sardar Syed Umeed Ali Shah (Late)
  - Sardar Syed Atta Muhammad Shah (Late): Sardar Syed Abdul Sattar Shah (Late) Sardar Syed Muhammad Ajmal Shah (Late)
- Time zone: UTC+5 (PST)

Dher Ummed Ali Shah is a village and one of 28 union councils, in the Mianwali District in the Punjab province of Pakistan. It is located in Mianwali tehsil at 32°49'59N 71°34'28E.
