= Chakchohdu =

Village in Pakistan

Chakchohdo is a village in Sialkot District of the Punjab province in Pakistan. It is located 6.5 kilometres (4.0 mi) from Bhopalwala. Chakchohdo is a small village of about 500 households with a population of 1000–3000.
