= Maruf, Okara =

Coordinates: 30°34′0″N 73°52′0″E

Maruf, Pakistan
- Town and union council
- Interactive map of Maruf, Pakistan
- Country: Pakistan
- Region: Punjab
- District: Okara District
- Time zone: UTC+5 (PST)

Maruf, also spelled Maroof, is a town and union council of Okara District in the Punjab province of Pakistan. It is located at 30°34'0N 73°52'0E at an altitude of 170 metres (561 feet).
