= Atma Singh, Pakistan =

Village in Punjab, Pakistan

Atma Singh
- Location within Pakistan
- Coordinates: 30.45°N 74.12°E
- Country: Pakistan
- Province: Punjab
- Elevation: 176 m (577 ft)
- Time zone: UTC+5 (PST)

Atma Singh is a village in the Punjab province of Pakistan.
