= Lolianwali =

Lolianwala
- Lolianwala
- Location within Pakistan
- Coordinates: 32.40°N 73.34°E
- Country: Pakistan
- Province: Punjab
- Elevation: 224 m (735 ft)

Population
  - Total: 3,000
- Time zone: UTC+5 (PST)

Lolianwala is a village of Mandi Bahauddin District in the Punjab province of Pakistan. It is located at 32°40'0N 73°34'0E at an altitude of 224 meters (738 feet). Its name has been changed as "Kot Noor Shah" with reference of shrine of Syed Noor Hussain Shah.
