= Mamuri, Fazl =

Mamuri معموري
- Village
- Location within Iran
- Coordinates: 36°07′21″N 58°55′50″E
- Country: Iran
- Province: Razavi Khorasan
- County: Nishapur
- Bakhsh: Central
- Rural District: Fazl

Population (2006)
  - Total: 413
- Time zone: UTC+3:30 (IRST)
  - Summer (DST): UTC+4:30 (IRDT)

Mamuri (Persian: معموري, also Romanized as Ma‘mūrī) is a village in Fazl Rural District, in the Central District of Nishapur County, Razavi Khorasan Province, Iran. At the 2006 census, its population was 413, in 113 families.
