= Kaslian =

Kaslian کسلیاں
- Village
- Location in Pakistan
- Coordinates: 32.623313°N 73.089481°E
- Country: Pakistan
- Province: Punjab
- District: Jhelum

Population
  - Total: 2,150
- Time zone: UTC+5 (PST)

Kaslian (Urdu:کسلیاں) is a village and union council of Jhelum District in the Punjab Province of Pakistan. It is part of Pind Dadan Khan Tehsil.
