= Rajar, Khushab =

Village in Pakistan

Rakh Rajar is a village in Khushab district in the Punjab province of Pakistan. It is situated at about 15 km North-East side of Khushab city.
