= Rana Colony =

- Town
- Location within Pakistan
- Coordinates: 32.18°N 74.9°E
- Country: Pakistan
- Time zone: UTC+5 (PST)

Rana Colony (Punjabi: رانا کولونے) is a small town in Gujranwala District in the Punjab province of Pakistan.

The town, which has a population of approximately 5,000, is located along the Grand Trunk Road passing through the city of Gujranwala. The population is over 99% Muslim. Most residents speak Punjabi, though almost all can also speak Urdu, the national language of Pakistan.
