= Naseer Pur Kalan =

- Interactive map of Naseer Pur Kalan
- Coordinates: 32°6′45.7″N 73°7′57.1″E
- Country: Pakistan
- Province: Punjab
- District: Sargodha
- Tehsil: Kot Momin
- Postal code: 40450

- Naseer Pur Kalan (نصير پور کلاں) is a village in Sargodha, in the Punjab province of Pakistan. It is the biggest village in the tehsil of Kot Momin by area. It also is the one of union council of Kot Momin.
- It has approximately 10 km radius or 6.21 miles. According to 2020 census, it has approximately 149,609 population in the radius where it is located.
- Naseer Pur Kalan Postal Code is 40451
- It is near Midh Ranjha City.
- There are many facilities like High School, government hospital, post office, repair shops and photographers.
