= Manghrotha =

Town in Punjab, Pakistan

Mangrotha is a populated place in district Dera Ghazi Khan and in Tehsil Taunsa Sharif in Pakistan.
