= Pind Rahim Shah =

Pind Rahim Shah پنڈ رحیم شاہ
- Village
- Location in Pakistan
- Coordinates: 32°11′18″N 73°01′43″E
- Country: Pakistan
- Province: Punjab
- District: Sargodha

Pind Rahim Shah is a small village near Miani town in Sargodha District, Punjab province, Pakistan. The village was founded by a person named Rahim Shah - hence the name Pind Rahim Shah or village of Rahim Shah. There are many ethnic groups in the village but the majority are Sherazi Syed, who originate from Shiraz a city of Iran.
