= Surajpur, Pakistan =

Sirajpur
- Location within Pakistan
- Coordinates: 30.12°N 71.27°E
- Country: Pakistan
- Province: Punjab
- Time zone: UTC+5 (PST)

Surajpur is a village in Faisalabad District of the Punjab province in Pakistan. It is located at an altitude of 172 metres (567 feet).
