= Churatta =

- Union council and town
- Location in Pakistan
- Coordinates: 30°4′0″N 70°39′5″E
- Country: Pakistan
- Province: Punjab
- District: Dera Ghazi Khan District
- Elevation: 384 ft (117 m)
- Time zone: UTC+5 (PST)
  - Summer (DST): +6

Churatta is a town and union council of Dera Ghazi Khan District in the Punjab province of Pakistan. It is located at 30°4'0N 70°39'5E and has an altitude of 117 metres (387 feet).
