= Grinkot =

Green kot
- Village
- Location within Pakistan
- Coordinates: 30°56′56″N 73°44′36″E
- Country: Pakistan
- Province: Punjab
- District: Kasur
- Time zone: UTC+5 (PST)

Grinkot is a village in Kasur District in the Punjab province of Pakistan. It is part of Kasur Tehsil and is located at 31°12'54N 74°28'30E with an altitude of 198 metres (652 feet). This village was formed by Sekhon family. Their ancestor was a soldier in British army and for his services toward British army he was allotted land in colonial India. The village was named after an English officer. After partition, the Sekhon family moved to India and got settled in Patti, several kilometres from Grinkot.
