= Mangewala =

- Location within Pakistan
- Coordinates: 30.54°N 70.54°E
- Country: Pakistan
- Province: Punjab (Pakistan)
- District: Layyah
- Elevation: 133 m (436 ft)
- Time zone: UTC+5 (PST)

Mangewala is a town of Layyah District in the Punjab province of Pakistan. It is located at 30°54'20N 70°54'40E at an altitude of 133 metres (439 feet).
