= Kumarwala =

Kumārwāla
- Location in Pakistan
- Coordinates: 29°44′0″N 72°6′5″E
- Country: Pakistan
- Governorate: Punjab

Kumarwala is a city in Punjab, Pakistan.

Nearby Cities and Towns West North East South Bokha (0.9 nm) Mochipura (0.7 nm) Gulhari (1.2 nm) Jalla (1.9 nm) Kotla Bahlol (1.5 nm)
