= Mahtaman =

- Location within Pakistan
- Coordinates: 30.45°N 74.10°E
- Country: Pakistan
- Province: Punjab
- Elevation: 177 m (581 ft)
- Time zone: UTC+5 (PST)

Mahtaman is a village in the Punjab province of Pakistan. It is located at 30°45'45N 74°10'50E with an altitude of 177 metres (583 feet).
