= Mullanwali =

Coordinates: 31°32′35″N 71°5′0″E

Mullanwali is a town and Union Council of Bhakkar District in the Punjab province of Pakistan. It is part of Bhakkar Tehsil and is located at 31°32'36N 71°4'60E with an altitude of 154 metres (508 feet).

Mullanwali Central Area

In the core residential area of Mullanwali the three major castes are Mallana, Samtia and Rajpoot.

There are two primary level schools, one for boys and one for girls.

Teachers : Zafer Shah Shb, Jalil Shb highly respected teachers teaching boys school for years.

Mosque : There are two masajid Jamia Masjid Hanfia and Madni Masjid and Eid Gah Mahmoodia.
