= Paira =

- Village
- Location within Pakistan
- Coordinates: 32°15′20″N 74°44′0″E
- Country: Pakistan
- Province: Punjab
- District: Narowal
- Elevation: 241 m (791 ft)
- Time zone: UTC+5 (PST)

Paira is a village in Narowal District of the Punjab province of Pakistan. It is located at 32°15'20N 74°44'50E at an altitude of 241 metres (793 feet). Neighbouring settlements include Qila Sobha Singh, Bariar and Charwind.
