= Hero Sharqi =

- Town and union council
- Interactive map of Hero Sharqi
- Country: Pakistan
- Region: Punjab
- District: Dera Ghazi Khan District
- Time zone: UTC+5 (PST)
- Area code: 064

Hero Sharqi is a town and union council of Dera Ghazi Khan District in Punjab, Pakistan. The town is part of Taunsa Tehsil.

== Main tribe ==
The Tangwani Baloch are one of the most prominent tribes in this area.

Among the prominent Sardars of the Tangwani tribe were Sardar Sarfaraz Khan Tangwani and Sardar Ahmad Yar Khan Tangwani.

Today, prominent figures of the Tangwani tribe include Sardar Mehboob Khan Tangwani, a member of the family of Sardar Ahmad Yar Khan Tangwani, and other side Sardar Sohail Khan Tangwani, who is a descendant of Sardar Sarfaraz Khan Tangwani through his son Ghulam Muhammad Khan Tangwani and grandson Atta Muhammad Khan Tangwani.
