= Mabbuke =

- Location within Pakistan
- Coordinates: 31.07°N 74.39°E
- Country: Pakistan
- Province: Punjab
- Elevation: 191 m (627 ft)
- Time zone: UTC+5 (PST)

Mabbuke is a village in the Kasur District of Punjab province of Pakistan. It is located at 31°7'0N 74°39'0E with an altitude of 191 metres (629 feet).
