= Haji Ghazi =

- Union council and town
- Location in Pakistan
- Coordinates: 30°1′58″N 70°45′56″E
- Country: Pakistan
- Province: Punjab
- District: Dera Ghazi Khan District
- Elevation: 367 ft (112 m)
- Time zone: UTC+5 (PST)
  - Summer (DST): +6

Haji Ghazi is a town and union council of Dera Ghazi Khan District in the Punjab province of Pakistan. It is located at 30°1'58N 70°45'56E and has an altitude of 112 metres (370 feet).
