= Rahna =

- Location within Pakistan
- Coordinates: 32.53°N 72.42°E
- Country: Pakistan
- Province: Punjab
- Elevation: 516 m (1,693 ft)
- Time zone: UTC+5 (PST)

Rahna is a village in the Punjab province of Pakistan. It is located at 32°53'0N 72°42'0E with an altitude of 516 metres (1696 feet).
