= Sodian Gujar =

Sodian Gujar سوڈی گجر
- Village
- Country: Pakistan
- Province: Punjab
- District: Jhelum District
- Village: Sodian Gujar
- Time zone: UTC+5 (PST)

Sodian Gujar (Urdu: سوڈی گجر) is a village and union council of Jhelum District, in the Punjab Province of Pakistan. It is part of Pind Dadan Khan Tehsil.
