= Ranjhe =

- Location within Pakistan
- Coordinates: 33.06°N 72.32°E
- Country: Pakistan
- Province: Punjab
- Elevation: 410 m (1,350 ft)
- Time zone: UTC+5 (PST)

Ranjhe is a village in the Punjab province of Pakistan. It is located at 33°6'0N 72°32'46E with an altitude of 410 metres (1348 feet).
