= Raisanwala =

Village in Punjab, Pakistan

- Location within Pakistan
- Coordinates: 30.39°N 73.24°E
- Country: Pakistan
- Province: Punjab
- Elevation: 156 m (512 ft)
- Time zone: UTC+5 (PST)

Raisanwala is a village in the Punjab province of Pakistan.
