= Aligarh, Pakistan =

Aligarh علی گڑھ
- Village
- Location within Pakistan
- Coordinates: 30.46°N 72.18°E
- Country: Pakistan
- Province: Punjab
- Elevation: 151 m (495 ft)
- Time zone: UTC+5 (PST)

Aligarh (Urdu: علی گڑھ) is a town in the Punjab province of Pakistan. It is located at 30°46'25N 72°18'40E with an altitude of 151 metres (498 feet) and is situated in Gojra Tehsil, Toba Tek Singh District.
