= Bairi, Pakistan =

Bairi
- Location within Pakistan
- Coordinates: 32.27°N 75.04°E
- Country: Pakistan
- Province: Punjab
- Elevation: 292 m (958 ft)
- Time zone: UTC+5 (PST)

Bairi is a village of Sialkot District in the Punjab province of Pakistan. It lies in the east of the district at an altitude of 292 metres (961 feet).
