= Kotehra =

- Location within Pakistan
- Coordinates: 32.42°N 73.31°E
- Country: Pakistan
- Province: Punjab
- District: Mandi Bahauddin
- Elevation: 205 m (673 ft)
- Time zone: UTC+5 (PST)

Kotehra is a village of Mandi Bahauddin District in the Punjab province of Pakistan. It is located at 32°42'0N 73°31'0E at an altitude of 205 metres (675 feet).

Kotehra is a small village near Malakwal. It is a green landed village in the west of Malakwal between River Jhelum and Lower Jhelam Canal. There are about 200 homes and the population is about 2500. Most people are farmers and daily laborers.
