= Longo, Pakistan =

Longo
- Location within Pakistan
- Coordinates: 32.45°N 73.45°E
- Country: Pakistan
- Province: Punjab
- District: Gujrat
- Elevation: 244 m (801 ft)
- Time zone: UTC+5 (PST)

Longo is a village in Gujrat District in the Punjab province of Pakistan. It is located at 32°45'0N 73°45'0E with an altitude of 244 metres (803 feet).
