= Charat Singhwala =

- Village
- Location within Pakistan
- Coordinates: 30.40°N 73.41°E
- Country: Pakistan
- Province: Punjab
- District: Sahiwal
- Elevation: 166 m (545 ft)
- Time zone: UTC+5 (PST)

Charat Singhwala is a village in the Punjab province of Pakistan. It is part of Sahiwal District, and is located at 30°40'0N 73°41'55E with an altitude of 166 metres (547 feet).
