= Abbakhel, Mianwali =

Abbakhel
- Village and union council
- Location in Pakistan
- Coordinates: 32°36′15″N 71°39′45″E
- Country: Pakistan
- Region: Punjab
- District: Mianwali
- Time zone: UTC+5 (PST)

Abbakhel is a village and union council of Mianwali in the Punjab province of Pakistan. It is located at 32°36'15N 71°39'45E and is situated to the north-east of Mianwali.
