= Mirbaz =

- Village
- Location within Pakistan
- Coordinates: 30.41°N 73.40°E
- Country: Pakistan
- Province: Punjab
- District: Sahiwal
- Elevation: 167 m (548 ft)
- Time zone: UTC+5 (PST)

Mirbaz is a village in the Punjab province of Pakistan. It is part of Sahiwal District and is located at 30°41'0N 73°40'30E with an altitude of 167 metres (551 feet).
