= Targa, Kasur =

Targa
- Location within Pakistan
- Coordinates: 31.10°N 74.31°E
- Country: Pakistan
- Province: Punjab
- Elevation: 193 m (633 ft)
- Time zone: UTC+5 (PST)

Targa is a village in the Punjab province of Pakistan. It is located in Kasur District at 31°10'0N 74°31'0E with an altitude of 193 metres (636 feet).
