= Rodu Sultan =

Town in Punjab, Pakistan

- Town
- Location within Pakistan
- Coordinates: 31°25′01″N 72°15′45″E
- Country: Pakistan
- Province: Punjab
- District: Jhang

Population (2017 Census of Pakistan)
  - Total: 414,131 (population of Jhang city)
- Time zone: UTC+5 (PST)

Rodu Sultan is a town of Athara Hazari Tehsil, Jhang District in the Punjab province of Pakistan. It is located at 31°4'N 72°0'E with an elevation of 150 metres (490 ft).

Shrines of Sufi saint Sultan Bahoo and Rodu Sultan are located near the town of Rodu Sultan.
