= Zaffer Abad Noon =

Zaffer Abad Noon ظفر آباد نون
- Village
- Location in Pakistan
- Coordinates: 32°11′18″N 73°01′43″E
- Country: Pakistan
- Province: Punjab
- District: Sargodha

Zaffer Abad Noon (Urdu: ظفر آباد نون) is a small village situated in Bhalwal Tehsil in the Punjab province of Pakistan. A former member of the National Assembly of Pakistan, Karam Bakhsh Awan, is from this village.
