= Mumbhar =

- Location within Pakistan
- Coordinates: 31.02°N 73.20°E
- Country: Pakistan
- Province: Punjab
- Elevation: 163 m (535 ft)
- Time zone: UTC+5 (PST)

Mumbhar is a village in the Punjab province of Pakistan. It is located at 31°2'45N 73°20'40E with an altitude of 163 metres (538 feet).
