= Pahrianwali =

Town in the Punjab province of Pakistan

Coordinates: 32°29′N 73°46′E

Pahrianwali is a town in Mandi Bahauddin District in the Punjab province of Pakistan. It is located at 32°28'60N 73°46'0E at an altitude of 215 metres (708 feet). The village is part of Phalia tehsil. The town has served as a central market for surrounding villages and has its own union council, post office, playground, bazaar, rural health centre, veterinary hospital, government operated boys and girls schools and colleges.
