= Kot Ismail =

Coordinates: 31.62397°N 72.93499°E

Kot Ismail is a small village in Chiniot District, Punjab, Pakistan.
