= Jauharabad-I =

- Town and union council
- Country: Pakistan
- Region: Punjab Province
- District: Khushab District
- After the name of Maulana Muhammad Ali Johar: 1950

Government
  - District Nazim: Sumera Malik
  - District Naib Nazim: Malik Masood Nazir Rajar

Population
  - Urban: 19lac(approximately)
- Time zone: UTC+5 (PST)
- Pakistan Post: 25500
- Area code: 0454

Jauharabad-I is one of the 51 Union Councils (administrative subdivisions) of Khushab District in the Punjab Province of Pakistan.
