= Aaliwala =

- Union council and town
- Location in Pakistan
- Coordinates: 29°56′7″N 70°40′26″E
- Country: Pakistan
- Province: Punjab
- District: Dera Ghazi Khan District
- Elevation: 371 ft (113 m)
- Time zone: UTC+5 (PST)
  - Summer (DST): +6

Aaliwala is a town and union council of Dera Ghazi Khan District in the Punjab province of Pakistan. It is located at 29°56'7N 70°40'26E and has an altitude of 113 metres (374 feet). Aali wala is belong to the Alyani leghari tribe, Alyani family have keep supremacy on this area from the 15th century. The Leghari Nawabs (Chiefs) belong to the Alyani clan of the Leghari tribe. Dr. Faisal Iqbal is the only person on the Wikipedia list from Aaliwala and is a professional scientist who has worked at the University of Pennsylvania, Philadelphia, and the University of Illinois, Chicago, US.
