= Ransial =

rangsial
- Ransial
- Location within Pakistan
- Coordinates: 32.43°N 72.41°E
- Country: Pakistan
- Province: Punjab

Area
  - Total: 10 km^{2} (3.9 sq mi)
- Elevation: 811 m (2,661 ft)

Population (2011)
  - Total: 2,000
  - Density: 200/km^{2} (520/sq mi)
- Time zone: UTC+5 (PST)
- Calling code: 573

Rangsial is a village in the Punjab province of Pakistan. It is located at 32°43'0N 72°41'0E with an altitude of 811 metres (2,664 feet).
