= Angadpura =

Coordinates: 30.9877454°N 72.6496589°E

Angadpura.
- Village
- Interactive map of Angadpura
- Country: Pakistan
- Region: Toba Tek Singh
- District: Toba Tek Singh District
- Time zone: UTC+5 (PST)

Angadpura, chak 520, is a small village situated nearby Gogera Branch Canal in Toba Tek Singh District, Pakistan. It is between Gojra city and Toba Tek Singh city. It was rehabilitated by the government with migrators who moved from Nasarke Batala.

== Information ==
100 percent of the people are Muslim. Two Mosques and two government schools are in Angadpura.

== History ==
The village is an agricultural land.
