= Jand Najjar =

Village in Punjab region of Pakistan

Coordinates: 33°15′N 73°22′E

- Village
- Location within Pakistan
- Country: Pakistan
- Province: Punjab (Pakistan)
- District: Rawalpindi
- Time zone: UTC+5 (PST)

Kuri Jajwal (Urdu: کوری ججوال) is a small village near the city of Gujar Khan, in the district of Rawalpindi in Pakistan.
