= Chap Sandi =

- Location within Pakistan
- Coordinates: 31.59°N 71.10°E
- Country: Pakistan
- Province: Punjab
- Time zone: UTC+5 (PST)

Chap Sandi is a village of Bhakkar District in the Punjab Province of Pakistan.
