= Chak 667/8 GB =

Chak 667/8 GB, Pir Mahal چک ۶۶۷/۸ گ ب
- Location within Pakistan
- Coordinates: 30.7487882°N 72.4630737°E
- Country: Pakistan
- Province: Punjab

Population (1998)
  - Total: 3,000
  - Estimate (2006): 6,000
- Time zone: UTC+5 (PST)
- Calling code: 046

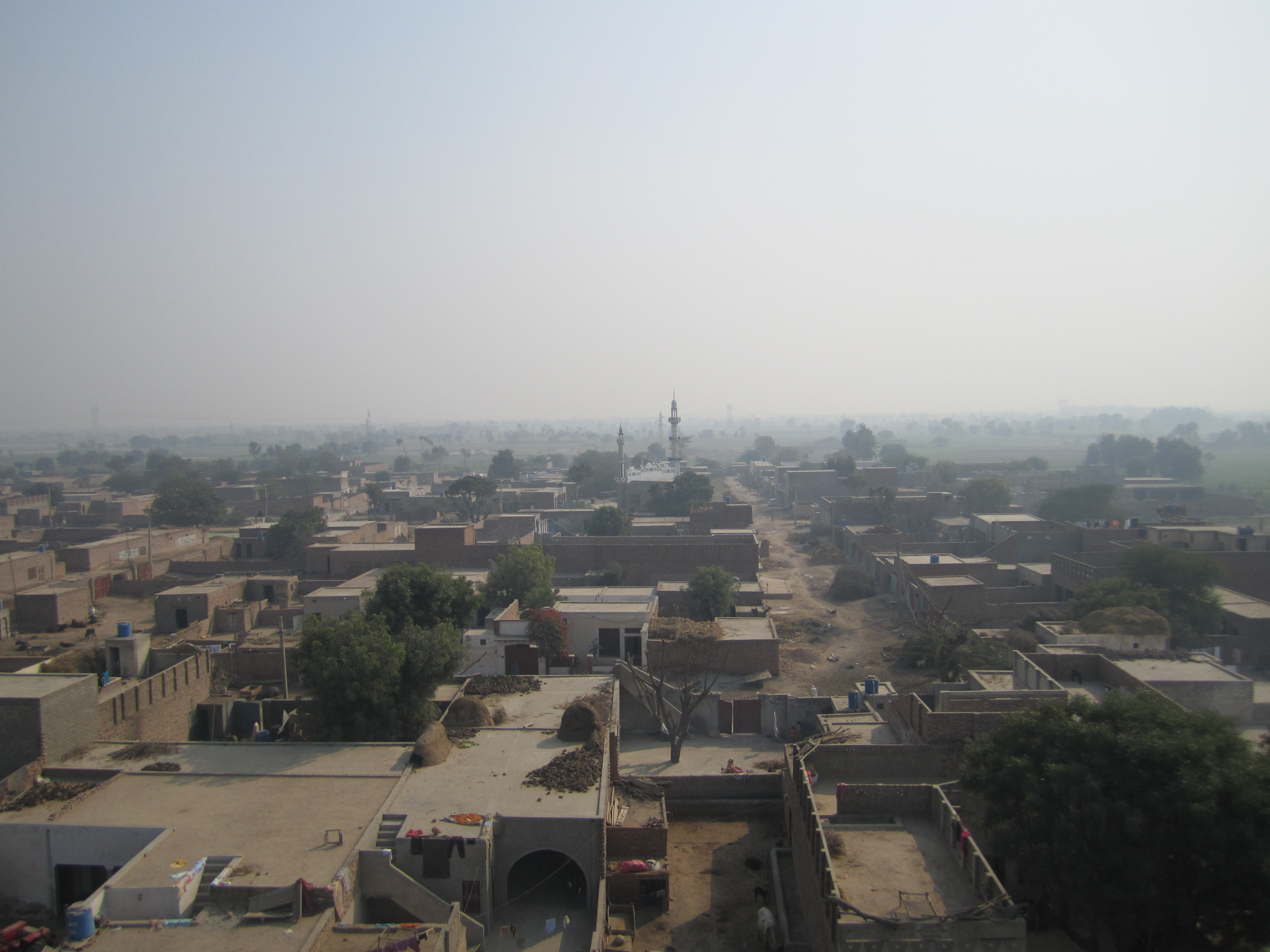
Chak 667/8 GB Aerial view

Chak 667/8 GB is a village located in Pir Mahal Tehsil, Toba Tek Singh District, Punjab, Pakistan. The village lies approximately 8 kilometres south of Pir Mahal city, within the canal colony areas developed under British rule. It is geographically positioned at coordinates 30.7488°N 72.4631°E, at an elevation of around 100 metres (330 feet).

== History ==
The village Chak 667/8 GB was established during the British colonial era as part of the Gugera Branch canal colony settlements in the Sandal Bar region of Punjab. These "chak" villages were systematically numbered, with the initials "GB" signifying Gugera Branch Canal, part of the Lower Chenab Canal system introduced to irrigate previously uncultivated lands. Post-1947 partition, the village experienced demographic shifts due to the migration of Sikh landholders to India and incoming Muslim refugees settling in their place.

== Demographics ==
According to the 2017 national census of Pakistan, Chak 667/8 GB had a population of approximately 1,840.

== Geography and Climate ==
Chak 667/8 GB is situated on the flat plains of central Punjab, characterized by fertile, irrigated farmland. Climatically, it falls within a hot semi-arid zone, experiencing very hot summers with temperatures exceeding 40°C during peak months (May to July), and mild winters, typically ranging between 5°C and 25°C from December to February. The average annual rainfall is modest, averaging around 300-400mm, mostly occurring in the monsoon months of July and August.
