= Dargahi Shah =

- Village
- Location within Pakistan
- Coordinates: 31°25′01″N 72°15′45″E
- Country: Pakistan
- Province: Punjab
- District: Jhang
- Time zone: UTC+5 (PST)

Dargahi Shah is a village in Jhang District in the Punjab province of Pakistan. It is located at 31°7'0N 72°2'60E with an altitude of 148 metres (488 feet).
