= Rupal, Punjab =

Rupal
- Location within Pakistan
- Coordinates: 30.40°N 74.09°E
- Country: Pakistan
- Province: Punjab
- Elevation: 174 m (571 ft)
- Time zone: UTC+5 (PST)

Rupal is a village in the Punjab province of Pakistan. It is located at 30°40'0N 74°9'0E with an altitude of 174 metres (574 feet).
