= Paharewala =

- Location within Pakistan
- Coordinates: 30.39°N 73.48°E
- Country: Pakistan
- Province: Punjab
- Elevation: 171 m (561 ft)
- Time zone: UTC+5 (PST)

Paharewala is a village in the Punjab province of Pakistan. It is located at 30°39'0N 73°48'0E with an altitude of 171 metres (564 feet).
