= Ratta, Chakwal =

Ratta
- Location within Pakistan
- Coordinates: 32.51°N 72.41°E
- Country: Pakistan
- Province: Punjab
- District: Chakwal
- Elevation: 520 m (1,710 ft)
- Time zone: UTC+5 (PST)

Ratta is a village in Kallar Kahar Tehsil of Chakwal District in the Punjab province of Pakistan. It is located at 32°51'0N 72°41'0E at an altitude of 520 metres (1709 feet).
