= Jaluwali =

Jalluwali
- Town and Union Council
- Country: Pakistan
- Region: Punjab
- District: District Taunsa

Government
- Time zone: UTC+5 (PST)

Jalluwali is a town and union council of District Taunsa in the Punjab province of Pakistan. The town is part of Vehova Tehsil. Mostly Khetran, Leghari, Syed, Buzdar, Lashari, Malik, Kulachi Baloch, Bhutta, Sial, Bhatti, Langah and Khoje are settled here.
