= Khola At Khanqah Sirajia =

Coordinates: 32°00′N 7°30′E

Khanqah Sirajia خانٛقاه سِراجيہ
- Town and union council
- Interactive map of Khanqah Sirajia خانٛقاه سِراجيہ
- Country: Pakistan
- Region: Punjab
- District: Mianwali District
- Tehsil: Piplan Tehsil
- Time zone: UTC+5 (PST)

Khanqah Sirajia (Urdu: خانٛقاه سِراجيہ), is a Union Council of Mianwali District in the Punjab province of Pakistan. Ding Khola is a village in this union council. It is an administrative subdivision of Piplan Tehsil.
