= Pichnand =

Pachnand
- Village and union council
- Moh Beli, Pichnand
- Country: Pakistan
- Region: Punjab Province
- District: Talagang District
- Tehsil: Tehsil Lawa
- Time zone: UTC+5 (PST)
- Website: www.pachnand.com

Pachnand is a village and union council, an administrative subdivision, of Talagang District in the Punjab Province of Pakistan, it is part of Tehsil Lawa.
