= Sluice, Pakistan =

Sluice
- Location within Pakistan
- Coordinates: 30.48°N 74.12°E
- Country: Pakistan
- Province: Punjab
- Elevation: 181 m (594 ft)
- Time zone: UTC+5 (PST)

Sluice is a village in the Punjab province of Pakistan. It is located at 30°48'50N 74°12'15E with an altitude of 181 metres (597 feet).
