= Mahrawali =

- Location within Pakistan
- Coordinates: 30.47°N 74.12°E
- Country: Pakistan
- Province: Punjab
- Elevation: 176 m (577 ft)
- Time zone: UTC+5 (PST)

Mahrawali is a village in Kasur District of Punjab province, Pakistan. It is located at 30°47'0N 74°12'35E with an altitude of 176 metres (580 feet).
