= Swans, Punjab =

Sawans, Punjab
- Village and Union Council
- Country: Pakistan
- Region: Punjab
- District: Mianwali District
- Time zone: UTC+5 (PST)

Sawans is a village and union council of Mianwali District in the Punjab Province of Pakistan. The Union Council is an administrative Subdivision of Mianwali Tehsil.
