= Noor Pur Sayedan =

Pakistani village

Noor Pur Syedan
- Village
- Location in Pakistan
- Coordinates: 32°35′38″N 72°56′36″E
- Country: Pakistan
- Province: Punjab
- District: Jhelum District
- Time zone: UTC+5 (PST)
  - Summer (DST): +6

Noor Pur Syedan is a small village adjacent to G.T Road, and northeast of the city of Jehlum. It was founded in the spring of 1948, when it was directly funded by Mohammed Ali Jinnah, the founder of Pakistan.

The residents of this small community pride themselves on their kinship and their direct descent from the Prophet of Islam.
