= Dhangri =

Coordinates: 33°13′N 73°47′E

Dhangri is a small village situated near Chakswari in the Mirpur District of Azad Kashmir. The closest airport is ISB - Islamabad Chaklala, located 87.7 km north of Dhangri. It is just further from the village of Brutiyan and about 15–20 minutes away from Dudial. Dhangri has a relatively small population with most of the inhabitants doing manual labor on very low pay. However, almost 75% of the inhabitants of Dhangri moved to England or other European countries in the 1960s, where they have settled with growing families.

== Dhangri Mosque ==
Dhangri has a large mosque that is currently undergoing development.

== Tribes ==
Dhangri is host to many different tribes. Jats who are well known throughout the many villages surrounding Dhangri and even as far as Jhelum, Punjab. The land surrounding Dhangri is mainly owned by the Gujjar tribe.
