= Patalian =

- Location within Pakistan
- Coordinates: 33.06°N 72.34°E
- Country: Pakistan
- Province: Punjab
- Elevation: 379 m (1,243 ft)
- Time zone: UTC+5 (PST)

Patalian is a village in the Punjab province of Pakistan. It is located at 33°6'59N 72°34'3E with an altitude of 379 metres (1246 feet).
