= Mianwala Kariya =

- Location within Pakistan
- Coordinates: 29°39′50″N 70°25′20″E
- Country: Pakistan
- Province: Punjab
- District: Bahawalpur
- Elevation: 110 m (360 ft)
- Time zone: UTC+5 (PST)

Mianwala Kariya is a town of Bahawalpur District in the Punjab province of Pakistan. Neighbouring settlements include Najwaniwala and Faqirwali.
