= Kapurpur, Pakistan =

Kapurpur
- Location within Pakistan
- Coordinates: 32.18°N 74.43°E
- Country: Pakistan
- Province: Punjab (Pakistan)
- District: Sialkot
- Elevation: 239 m (784 ft)
- Time zone: UTC+5 (PST)

Kapurpur is a village in Sialkot District in the province of Punjab in Pakistan.
