= Toba Qalandar Shah =

Town in Punjab, Pakistan

Coordinates: 30°5′0″N 73°18′0″E

Toba Qalandar Shah is a town in the Punjab province of Pakistan. It is located at an altitude of 151 metres (498 feet).
