= Sikandar Pura =

- Village
- Location of Sikandar Pura within Pakistan
- Coordinates: 30°58′25″N 74°09′19″E
- Country: Pakistan
- Province: Punjab
- District: Kasur District

Government
  - Sherwan: Khai Hithar
- Elevation: 180 m (590 ft)
- Time zone: UTC+5 (PST)

Sikandar Pura is a village located on the Chunian-Khudian road, 12 kilometres (7.5 mi) from Khudian and 17 kilometres (11 mi) from Chunian, in Kasur District, in the Punjab province of Pakistan. It is a highly populated area. Its union council is Khai Hithar.
