= Puna, Pakistan =

Puna
- Location within Pakistan
- Coordinates: 29.40°N 72.10°E
- Country: Pakistan
- Province: Punjab
- Elevation: 111 m (364 ft)
- Time zone: UTC+5 (PST)

Puna is a village in the Punjab province of Pakistan. It is located at 29°40'57N 72°10'12E with an altitude of 111 metres (367 feet).
