= Faizpur, Pakistan =

Faizpur Sadaat is a small village in the Pakistani province of Punjab in the district of lahore Pakpattan. This village is mostly inhabited by Zaidi Syed community

This village was founded by Sir Faiz-ul-Hassan, who was a prominent British civil servant. He originally came and migrated from the city of Wasat which at that time was located in Mesopotamia (present Iraq). Because of his services, the British government gave him a big piece of land. He had settled there and named this village Faizpur Sadat.

Syed Faiz ul hassan Al-Hussaini-al Wastee migrated from Gowali Sadaat Nehtaur, Chandpur District Bijnor UP, India in 1880. He was transferred to Kasur District for the construction of Head Gganda Sing Walla Bridge. He was a prominent Engineer.

Mr. Faizul-Hassan was awarded the title of Khan Bahadur by the British government and was nominated to be knight but died before he could make his way to England for the ceremony. He had three sons.

Syed Qamar Abbas Shah established the road and the electricity system first time in the history.

== Location ==
Faizpur village is located 6 km behind Bonga Hayat near Pakpattan, Punjab Pakistan.
