= Ghaus Abad =

Ghaus Abad Mahatam
- Town and union council
- Country: Pakistan
- Region: Punjab
- District: Dera Ghazi Khan District
- Time zone: UTC+5 (PST)

Ghaus Abad or Ghousabad (earlier Mahatam) is a town and union council of Dera Ghazi Khan District in the Punjab province of Pakistan Ghousabad was earlier known as Mahatam after partition of india a large hindu population of village migrated from here to delhi and faridabad in india.
