= Mohra Awan =

Mohra Awan موہڑہ اعوان
- Village
- Location in Punjab, Pakistan
- Country: Pakistan
- Province: Punjab
- District: Chakwal District
- Tehsil: Chakwal
- Union Council: Padshahan
- Settled by: Awan tribe

Area
  - Total: 3.28 km^{2} (1.27 sq mi)
- Elevation: 445 m (1,460 ft)

Population (2025 (est.))
  - Total: 1,500–1,700
- Time zone: UTC+5 (PKT)
- Post Office: Padshahan
- Police Station: Dhudial

Mohra Awan (Urdu: موہڑہ اعوان) is a village in Chakwal District, Punjab, Pakistan, located near Padshahan at approximately 33.0108°N 73.0571°E. The village is named for the Awan tribe, who form the majority of its population.

== Geography ==
Mohra Awan lies about 1.33 km from Padshahan, 13 km from Mulhal Mughlan and 30 km from Chakwal city, at an elevation of roughly 445 metres. It covers approximately 3.28 km² and is bounded by two seasonal water streams. The terrain is part of the Salt Range foothills on the Pothohar Plateau.

== History ==
Before the Partition of 1947, Hindus and Sikhs lived in the village before migrating to India. Since then, Mohra Awan has become widely known locally for military service, with many residents described as ghazis and shuhada.

== Administration ==
The village forms part of Union Council Padshahan in Chakwal Tehsil, falls within Mauza Padshahan, uses Padshahan Post Office, and comes under Dhudial Police Station.

== Demographics ==
The estimated population in 2025 is between 1,500 and 1,700, predominantly Awan. The main language spoken is Punjabi. Livelihood patterns are commonly described locally as: 50–60% of households with members in the Pakistan Army, about 16% working in Gulf countries, and about 4% in Europe and Australia, with the remainder engaged in farming.

== Economy ==
Agriculture is largely barani (rain-fed). Wheat and groundnut are the principal crops, and the area is locally regarded as a wheat-exporting locality.

== Education ==
- Government Primary School Mohra Awan (boys), EMIS 43338
- Government Girls Elementary School Mohra Awan (girls), EMIS 43567
- Sunries Public School Mohra Awan (private)

After primary level, students generally attend middle and high schools in Padshahan, Dhudial or Chakwal.

== Infrastructure ==
Electricity is supplied from the Khanpur feeder; there is no piped natural gas and households use LPG cylinders or wood. Water is obtained mainly from boreholes and tubewells; handpumps are largely disused. Mobile coverage is available on Ufone and Telenor 4G, though there is no tower within the village itself. Health facilities consist of two first-aid dispensaries (one male, one female); major cases are referred to Chakwal.

== Religion and culture ==
There are six mosques in the village, the principal being Markazi Jamia Masjid Hanfia. The annual village fair (mela) is held at Padshahan.

== Sports ==
Cricket is the main sport, with a village ground hosting a tournament each Eid al-Fitr.
