= Khushipur =

- Village
- Location within Pakistan
- Coordinates: 31.26°N 73.14°E
- Country: Pakistan
- Province: Punjab
- District: Faisalabad
- Elevation: 170 m (560 ft)
- Time zone: UTC+5 (PST)

Khushipur is a village in the Punjab province of Pakistan. It is located in Faisalabad District at 31°26'0N 73°14'0E at an altitude of 170 metres (561 feet).
