= Mulwal =

Mulwal, Pakistan
- Location within Pakistan
- Coordinates: 33.01°N 72.32°E
- Country: Pakistan
- Province: Punjab
- Elevation: 374 m (1,227 ft)
- Time zone: UTC+5 (PST)

Mulwal is a village in the Punjab province of Pakistan. It is located at 33°1'40N 72°32'11E with an altitude of 374 metres (1230 feet).
