= Mali Singh =

- Location within Pakistan
- Coordinates: 30.41°N 73.47°E
- Country: Pakistan
- Province: Punjab
- Elevation: 169 m (554 ft)
- Time zone: UTC+5 (PST)

Mali Singh is a village in the Punjab province of Pakistan. It is located at 30°41'30N 73°47'0E with an altitude of 169 metres (557 feet).
