= Tangowali =

Pakistani village

Tangowali ٹانگووالی
- Village
- Chak No. 17-S.B. Tangowali

- Location in Sargodha, Pakistan
- Coordinates: 32°08′30″N 72°50′50″E
- Country: Pakistan
- Province: (Punjab, Pakistan) Punjab
- District: Sargodha

Population
  - Total: 10,000
- Time zone: Asia/Karachi UTC/GMT+5
- Postal code: 40462
- Welfare: August 20, 2015
- Masques: 28 (1 Islamic Organization)
- Schools: 07 (1 Islamic), Punjabi

Tangowali (Punjabi, Urdu: ٹانگووالی) is a village in Sargodha District of Punjab, Pakistan. Its full name is Chak No. 17-S.B. It is situated in Sargodha, about 18 kilometers east of Sargodha District near Kot Momin Road. It is about 102 miles (or 164 km) to Islamabad in south, the country's capital. This village recently become the most active and social media village of Sargodha region by getting 25,000+ SUBSCRIBERS on YouTube by getting the help from most leading service group in the village.

== History ==
Tangowali which is commonly known as Tangowali or more famously "Kalyaran da Pind".

== Educational institutions ==
- Government Boys High School
- Government Girls Primary School
- Shaheen Public High School (Private)
- Jinnah Grammar Boys High School (Private)
- Jamia Usmania Taleem-UL-Quran (Islamic Organization)
- Al-Sadeed Public Primary School (Private)

== Language ==
As per the 1998 census of Pakistan, 95 percent of the villagers speak the Punjabi. Inhabitants of Tangowali speak a variety of Punjabi dialects, such as Majhi. Urdu is the mother language of few people, but as it is the national language, it is spoken and understood by most of the population.
