= Fattiwala =

- Location within Pakistan
- Coordinates: 31.05°N 74.36°E
- Country: Pakistan
- Province: Punjab
- Elevation: 193 m (633 ft)
- Time zone: UTC+5 (PST)

Fattiwala is a small village in the Punjab province of Pakistan. It is located near the Sutlej River in Kasur District, close to the Indian border. The village has an approximate population of 1,500 persons.
