= Nakka Kalan =

Naka Kalan
- Location within Pakistan
- Coordinates: 32.47°N 73.27°E
- Country: Pakistan
- Province: Punjab (Pakistan)
- Elevation: 240 m (790 ft)
- Time zone: UTC+5 (PST)

Naka Kalan is a village of Jhelum District in the Punjab province of Pakistan. Its original name is Nakka Kalān.
