= Sattoke =

- Location within Pakistan
- Coordinates: 31.14°N 74.19°E
- Country: Pakistan
- Province: Punjab
- Elevation: 195 m (640 ft)
- Time zone: UTC+5 (PST)

Sattoke is a town in the Punjab province of Pakistan. It is located at 31°14'26N 74°19'59E with an altitude of 195 metres (643 feet).
