= Mianwala =

- Village
- Location within Pakistan
- Coordinates: 30.58°N 70.52°E
- Country: Pakistan
- Province: Punjab
- District: Layyah
- Elevation: 138 m (453 ft)
- Time zone: UTC+5 (PST)

Mianwala is a village in Layyah District of the Punjab of Pakistan. It is located at 30°58'40N 70°52'20E with an altitude of 138 metres (456 feet).
