= Chhowni Sulehrian =

Human settlement in Pakistan

Chowni Sulehrian چھائونی سلہریاں
- Village
- Cantt Sulehrian
- Location within Pakistan
- Coordinates: 32°26′35.37″N 74°33′30.89″E
- Country: Pakistan
- Province: Punjab
- Named for: Establishing Cantonment

Government
  - MNA: Chaudry Armaghan Subhani (PML-N)
  - MNA: Chaudry Armaghan Subhani s/o Chaudry Abdul Sattar

Area
  - Total: 1.59 km^{2} (0.61 sq mi)
- Elevation: 256 m (840 ft)

Population (2017)
  - Total: 3,671
  - Estimate (2024): 4,700
  - Density: 2,302/km^{2} (5,960/sq mi)
- Demonym: Chowni walay
- Time zone: UTC+5
- 51310: 51310
- Calling code: 052

Chowni Sulehrian is a village within Sialkot Tehsil of Sialkot District, in Punjab Province, Pakistan. The population is 3,671, according to the 2017 Population Census by the Pakistan Bureau of Statistics, comprising 1,821 males, 1,843 females, and 7 transgender individuals. The literacy rate is 70.41%, with males at 72%, females at 68.90%, and transgender individuals at 77.78%.

The educational landscape of Chowni Sulehrian is characterized by a majority having primary but below matric education, with 631 males and 506 females. Those with matriculation but below other qualifications include 270 males, 352 females, and 4 transgender individuals. 53 males, 109 females, and 2 transgender individuals have attained degrees. Additionally, one male has attained a PhD.

Religiously, the village is predominantly Muslim, with 3,621 adherents, while a small minority of 50 individuals identify as non-Muslim. The age distribution reveals that 2,808 individuals are over 10 years old, 2,050 are over 18 years old, and 278 are seniors over 60 years old. The workforce, comprising individuals over 10 years old, numbers 953, and 1,732 residents over 18 years old hold a CNIC.

Spanning an area of 394 acres, Chowni Sulehrian is equipped with a basic health Unit, a government hospital, a private hospital, and an animal hospital, all of which cater to the medical and health needs of the village and surrounding rural areas. Educational facilities include a combined government secondary school for both boys and girls, although it currently faces resource and faculty shortages. The village also houses a post office.

Politically, Chowni Sulehrian played a role in the 2024 general elections, where an independent candidate supported by PTI won from this village with 73 votes, while the overall constituency was won by PMLN. Geographically, the village is strategically located on Sialkot Pasrur Road, opposite the Gold Panel Group Company, with the postal code 51310. The village has recently seen industrial growth, with several industries being established in the area, accompanied by the development of a link road to the village.
