= Kalsian =

Coordinates: 32°04′N 73°52′E

Kalsian is a small village located in Sheikhupura District, Punjab, Pakistan. It is located at 32°4'0N 73°52'0E and lies about 30 km North-West of Sheikhupura city.
