= Kalsian Bhattian =

Village in Punjab, Pakistan

Coordinates: 31°53′N 73°42′E

Kalsian (Urdu: کلسیاں بھٹیاں) is a small village located in Sheikhupura District, Punjab, Pakistan. It is located at 32°4'0N 73°52'0E and lies about 30 km North-West of Sheikhupura city. The name Kalsian is originated from kala shiin, which was taken from the early days of its settlement by its founders. When settlers from other parts of sub-continent came to this part to lay their footprints, they had a black panther in their neighbourhood jungle and afterwards they named the place kala shiin and then it kept on changing and lastly had Kalsian in the registries of Government books. Another theory regarding the origin of the name Kalsian is that at the time of settling the forefathers found here black mud which was in Punjabi pronounce as KALI Seehn that afterwards changed to kalsianThe nearest city from village Kalsian Bhatiian is Khangah Dograh(Urdu: خانقاہ ڈوگراں) on the south, Ajniyyah wala (Urdu: اجنیاہ والا) on the north, and Farooq Abad on the east۔ It is situated between villages Aswah Bhattian (Urdu: اسواں بھٹیاں), Takha Bhattian(Urdu: تکھہ بھٹیاں), Gajiana Nau (Urdu: گجیانہ نو) and Baka Bhattian (Urdu: بھاکا بھٹیاں)

== Demographics ==
Before the partition of India, in this village lived Muslim, Hindus and Sikh with peacefully. In 1947, all the Hindus and Sikh migrated to India. Kalsian population is mostly bhatti families. In 1948 Furqan force or Furqan battalion was created). It was formed in June 1948 at the direction of Ahmadiyya leader Mirza Mahmood, at the request of Pakistan government, the unit fought for Pakistan against India in the First Kashmir War. More than five people voluntarily joined Furqan force from Kalsian Bhattian. They protected the Pakistan border near Kashmir for six months.
