= Dhainke =

Village in Punjab, Pakistan

- Location within Pakistan
- Coordinates: 30.52°N 74.17°E
- Country: Pakistan
- Province: Punjab
- Elevation: 177 m (581 ft)
- Time zone: UTC+5 (PST)

Dhainke is a village in the Punjab province of Pakistan.
