= Kattarian =

Coordinates: 33°24′24.94″N 73°04′47.50″E

- Village
- Location within Pakistan
- Country: Pakistan
- Province: Punjab (Pakistan)
- District: Rawalpindi
- Time zone: UTC+5 (PST)

Kattarian is a small village situated 36 km to the southwest of Rawalpindi City in the Punjab province of Pakistan with a population of 2,500. It has a history of about 250 years.The main Caste of village Kattarian is Dhudhi Rajpoot Family. The main road is Chak Beli Khan road. The link road which connects to it is Nakraalil/Bagh Sangrain Road. Main bus stop is Piyal and Jhatta Hathial.
