= Dhapai =

Dhaipai
- Location within Pakistan
- Coordinates: 32°41′43″N 73°33′15″E
- Country: Pakistan
- Province: Punjab
- District: Mandi Bahauddin
- Elevation: 213 m (699 ft)
- Time zone: UTC+5 (PST)

Dhaipai is a village of Mandi Bahauddin District in the Punjab province of Pakistan. It is located at 32°41'43"N 73°33'15"E at an altitude of 252 metres (830 feet) above sea level.
