= Mana Ahmadani =

Union council and town in Punjab, Pakistan

Mana Ahmadani مانہ احمدانی
- Union council and town
- Location in Pakistan
- Coordinates: 29°47′58″N 70°35′3″E
- Country: Pakistan
- Province: Punjab
- District: Dera Ghazi Khan District
- Elevation: 111 m (364 ft)
- Time zone: UTC+5 (PST)
  - Summer (DST): +6

Mana Ahmadani (Urdu: مانہ احمدانی), is a town and union council of Dera Ghazi Khan District in the Punjab province of Pakistan.

Mana Ahmadani has been named after Sardar Mana Khan Ahmadani Baloch, who was the tribal chief of Ahmadani Baloch tribe. The prominent tribe of the town is Ahmadani Baloch. This Ahmadani tribe then has further subcastes. The castes in Mana Ahmadani other than Ahmadanis are Lond, Gurmani, and Muhajirs such as Rajput and Arain, etc.
