= Berianwali =

Village in Punjab, Pakistan

harel
- Location within Pakistan
- Coordinates: 30.38°N 74.05°E
- Country: Pakistan
- Province: Punjab
- Elevation: 172 m (564 ft)
- Time zone: UTC+5 (PST)

Berianwali is a village in the Punjab province of Pakistan.
