= Muhib Ali Uttar =

Coordinates: 30°25′0″N 73°37′0″E

مُحِبّ على اُتّر
- Town
- Muhib Ali Uttar
- Interactive map of مُحِبّ على اُتّر
- Country: Pakistan
- Region: Punjab
- District: Okara District
- Time zone: UTC+5 (PST)

Muhib Ali Uttar (Urdu: مُحِبّ على اُتّر) is a town and union council of Okara District in the Punjab province of Pakistan. Part of Depalpur Tehsil, the town is located at 30°25'0N 73°37'0E at an altitude of 159 metres (524 feet). The estimate terrain elevation above sea level is 168 metres.
