= Jassial =

Jasial
- Village
- Location in Pakistan Jasial (Pakistan)
- Country: Pakistan
- Province: Punjab
- District: Talagang

Population
  - Village: 3,400
  - Urban: 83%
- Time zone: UTC+5 (PST)
  - Summer (DST): +5.1

Jasial is a village and union council of Talagang District in the Punjab Province of Pakistan. It is part of Talagang District.
