= Dullah Bhadera =

Dullāh Bhādera
- village
- Location in Pakistan
- Coordinates: 29°48′0″N 72°42′0″E
- Country: Pakistan
- Province: Punjab
- District: Bahawalnagar District
- Tehsil: Chishtian Tehsil
- Union Council: Dullah Bhadera
- Elevation: 509 ft (155 m)
- Time zone: UTC+5 (PST)
  - Summer (DST): +6

Dullāh Bhādera (Urdu: دُلّہ بهڈيرا) is a village, a mauza and Union Council of Bahawalnagar District in the Punjab province of Pakistan. It is part of Chishtian Tehsil. It was founded three centuries ago by Pahakar Khan Bhadera, as the clan migrated from Sheher Farid to settle on their own lands. Originally named 'Bhadera,' it was later renamed Dullah Bhadera in the 1890s, after Abdullah Khan Bhadera, when it gained mauza status. Located a few kilometers from the Sutlej River, the village houses a hospital (Basic Health Unit) and separate middle schools for boys and girls. Primarily inhabited by the Bhadera Joiyas, a Rajput tribe, several other tribes also reside in the village.

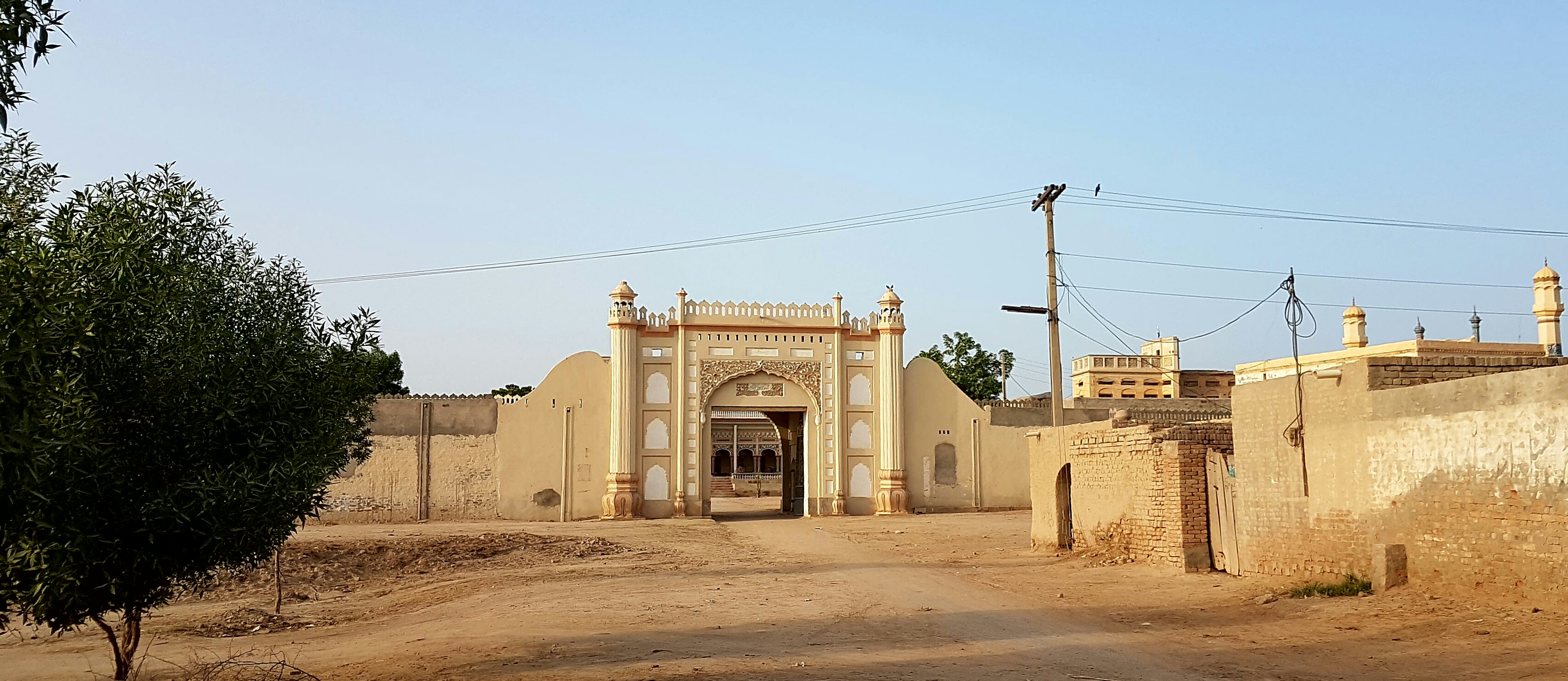
Bhadera Haveli
