= Abbasian Wala =

Coordinates: 32.062°N 71.345°E

Abbasian Wala is a small village located in Haitu union council in Kalurkot Tehsil, Bhakkar District, Punjab, Pakistan.
