= Goughabad =

- Location within Pakistan
- Coordinates: 31.24°N 73.3°E
- Country: Pakistan
- Province: Punjab
- Elevation: 170 m (560 ft)
- Time zone: UTC+5 (PST)

Goughabad is a town in Faisalabad District, in the Punjab province of Pakistan. It lies at 170 meters (560 feet) above sea level.
