= Kattowal =

Coordinates: 32°27′N 73°30′E

- Town and union council
- Interactive map of Kattowal
- Country: Pakistan
- Region: Punjab
- District: Mandi Bahauddin
- Time zone: UTC+5 (PST)

Kattowal, situated on the left bank of Jhelum River, is a small village in Malakwal subdivision of Mandi Bahauddin District in Pakistan.

It has a population of approximately 1,500 inhabitants, all of whom are Muslims. The village is renowned for the exceptional hospitality of its people, a trait deeply ingrained in their culture.

Sports play a significant role in the lives of Kattowal's residents. Volleyball is their favorite game, followed by kabaddi and cricket, which are also popular pastimes. The village is divided into three distinct parts: East Kattowal, West Kattowal, and Kattowal Adda.

Many of Kattowal's people reside abroad, contributing significantly to the local economy. The village is also notable for its well-educated population, reflecting a strong emphasis on education and development.
