= Addepur =

- Location within Pakistan
- Coordinates: 30.39°N 73.44°E
- Country: Pakistan
- Province: Punjab
- District: Sahiwal
- Elevation: 167 m (548 ft)
- Time zone: UTC+5 (PST)

Addepur is a village in the Punjab province of Pakistan. It is located at 30°49'0N 73°44'0E, at an altitude of 167 metres (551 feet).
