= Manuri =

- Location within Pakistan
- Coordinates: 30.45°N 74.09°E
- Country: Pakistan
- Province: Punjab
- Elevation: 179 m (587 ft)
- Time zone: UTC+5 (PST)

Manuri is a village in the Punjab province of Pakistan. It is located at 30°45'0N 74°9'0E with an altitude of 179 metres (590 feet).
