= Mal Awan =

Mal Awan مل اعوان (Urdu)
- Village
- Interactive map of Mal Awan
- Coordinates: 33°19′14″N 73°20′33″E
- Country: Pakistan
- Province: Punjab
- District: Rawalpindi
- Tehsil: Gujar Khan
- Union Council: Changa Bangial
- Time zone: UTC+5 (PST)

Mal Awan is a village in Union Council Changa Bangial, an administrative subdivision, of Gujar Khan Tehsil in the Punjab Province of Pakistan.

== Language ==
The local language is Punjabi (in Potohari dialects). Urdu, being the national language, is also used.

== Location ==
It is about fifteen kilometers from the Tehsil capital Gujar Khan and is located at 33°19'14N 73°20'33E.

== Demography ==
The number of its population is estimated to be 2,000 persons.

A large community of its residents reside in UK, middle east, and other countries of Europe.

== Education ==
- GPS Mal Awan
- GGES Mal Awan
- GHS Changa Maira
- Al-Waris Girls Elementary Education Foundation Mal Awan
