= Nari Shumali =

Union council and town in Punjab, Pakistan

Coordinates: 30°51′0″N 70°40′0″E

basti douna is a town and union council of Dera Ghazi Khan District in the Punjab province of Pakistan. The town is part of Taunsa Tehsil. It is located at 30°51'0N 70°40'0E and has an altitude of 136 metres (449 feet).
