= Bhagot =

- Location within Pakistan
- Coordinates: 32.17°N 74.40°E
- Country: Pakistan
- Province: Punjab
- Elevation: 238 m (781 ft)
- Time zone: UTC+5 (PST)

Bhagot is a village in Sialkot District in the Punjab province of Pakistan.
