= Chanda Singh Wala =

- Location within Pakistan
- Coordinates: 31.05°N 74.37°E
- Country: Pakistan
- Province: Punjab
- Elevation: 195 m (640 ft)
- Time zone: UTC+5 (PST)

Chanda Singh Wala is a village in Kasur District in the Punjab province of Pakistan. The word 'wala' means 'of' in English. It is located at 31°5'0N 74°37'0E with an altitude of 195 metres (643 feet). It is said that before the Partition it was a Sikh-majority village, but after the 1947 Partition the Sikhs migrated to East Punjab in India.
