= Janewali =

Village in Punjab Pakistan

Coordinates: 32°37′N 72°04′E

Janewali is a small village near Chawinda in Sialkot District in the Punjab province of Pakistan.
