= Samunpur =

- Location within Pakistan
- Coordinates: 32.41°N 73.33°E
- Country: Pakistan
- Province: Punjab
- District: Mandi Bahauddin
- Elevation: 213 m (699 ft)
- Time zone: UTC+5 (PST)

Samunpur is a village of Mandi Bahauddin District in the Punjab province of Pakistan. It is located at 32°41'0N 73°33'0E at an altitude of 213 metres (702 feet).
