= Pirwal =

- Location within Pakistan
- Coordinates: 33.06°N 72.36°E
- Country: Pakistan
- Province: Punjab
- Elevation: 386 m (1,266 ft)
- Time zone: UTC+5 (PST)

Pirwal is a village in the Punjab province of Pakistan. It is located at 33°6'0N 72°36'11E with an altitude of 386 metres (1,269 feet).
