= Mandranwala =

Village

Coordinates: 32°21′0″N 74°22′0″E

Mandranwala (Urdu/Punjabi:مندرانوالہ) is a village near Daska in Sialkot District in the Punjab province of Pakistan. Mandranwala is a medium-sized village situated only three kilometers from Daska city. It is 28 kilometers from Sialkot City.
