= Najabat =

- Location within Pakistan
- Coordinates: 30.49°N 74.14°E
- Country: Pakistan
- Province: Punjab
- Elevation: 181 m (594 ft)
- Time zone: UTC+5 (PST)

Najabat is a village in the Kasur District of Punjab province in Pakistan. It is located at 30°49'0N 74°14'0E with an altitude of 181 metres (597 feet).
