= Chhimmon =

Village and union council in Punjab, Pakistan

Coordinates: 32°33′0″N 73°22′0″E

Chhimmon is a village and union council of Mandi Bahauddin District in the Punjab province of Pakistan. The village is located in Mandi Bahauddin Tehsil at an altitude of 210 metres (691 feet) above sea level.
