= Bohge =

Village in Punjab, Pakistan

- Location within Pakistan
- Coordinates: 30.47°N 74.17°E
- Country: Pakistan
- Province: Punjab
- Elevation: 176 m (577 ft)
- Time zone: UTC+5 (PST)

Bohge is a village in the Punjab province of Pakistan.
