= Mamoori =

- Union council and town
- Location in Pakistan
- Coordinates: 29°54′57″N 70°33′52″E
- Country: Pakistan
- Province: Punjab
- District: Dera Ghazi Khan District
- Elevation: 377 ft (115 m)
- Time zone: UTC+5 (PST)
  - Summer (DST): +6

Mamoori or Mamuri is a town and union council of Dera Ghazi Khan District in the Punjab province of Pakistan. It is located at 29°54'57N 70°33'52E and has an altitude of 115 metres (380 feet).
