= Golepur =

Golepur گولپور
- Village and union council
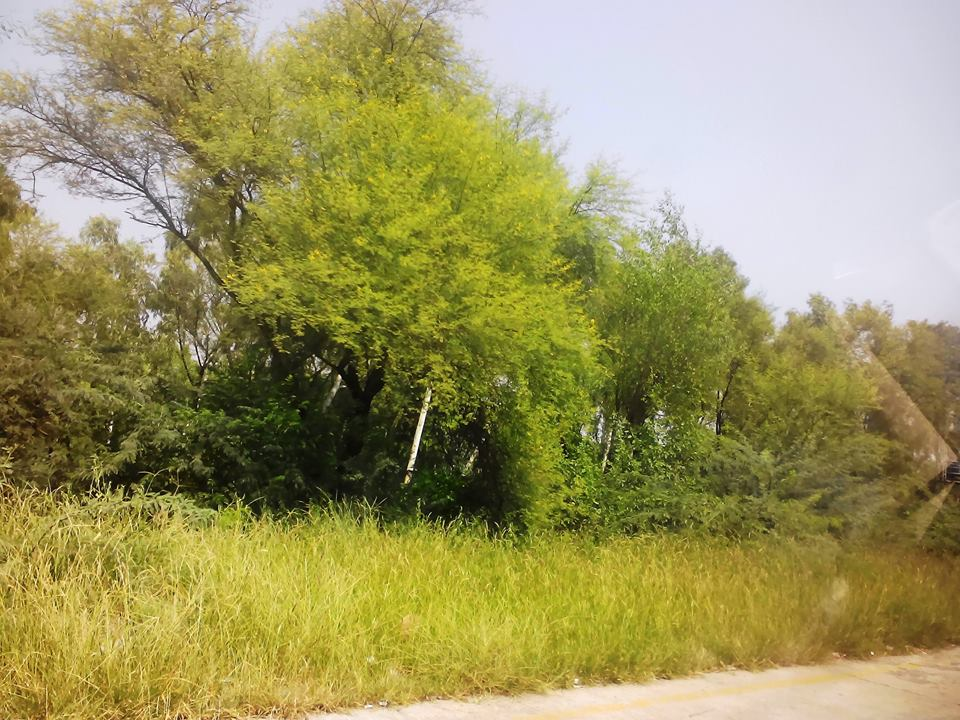
- Golepur
- Country: Pakistan
- Province: Punjab
- District: Jhelum
- Tehsil: Pind Dadan Khan
- Villages in Union Council: 10

Government
  - Type: Local Gov.
  - Chairman UC: Naseer Ahmed Khandowa (PTI)
- Time zone: UTC+5 (PST)

Golepur (Urdu: گولپور) is a village and union council of Jhelum District in the Punjab Province of Pakistan. It lies about 71 mi (114 km) south of Islamabad, the country's capital city. A facility comprising ticket office, platforms, etc. for loading and unloading train passengers and freight is located at Golepur railway station.

It is part of Tehsil Pind Dadan Khan.

== Villages in union council ==
Golepur Union Council is subdivided into 10 villages:

- Chan Pur
- Choran
- Dandot RS Dalmian
- Dhoke Vaince
- Golepur
- Hattar Jhelum
- Kora
- Pither Kalan
- Pither Nadi
- Sihotra

== See also ==
Golepur railway station
