= Dandot RS =

Shireen Abad (Dandot RS) (شیریں آباد (ڈنڈوت آر ایس
- Village
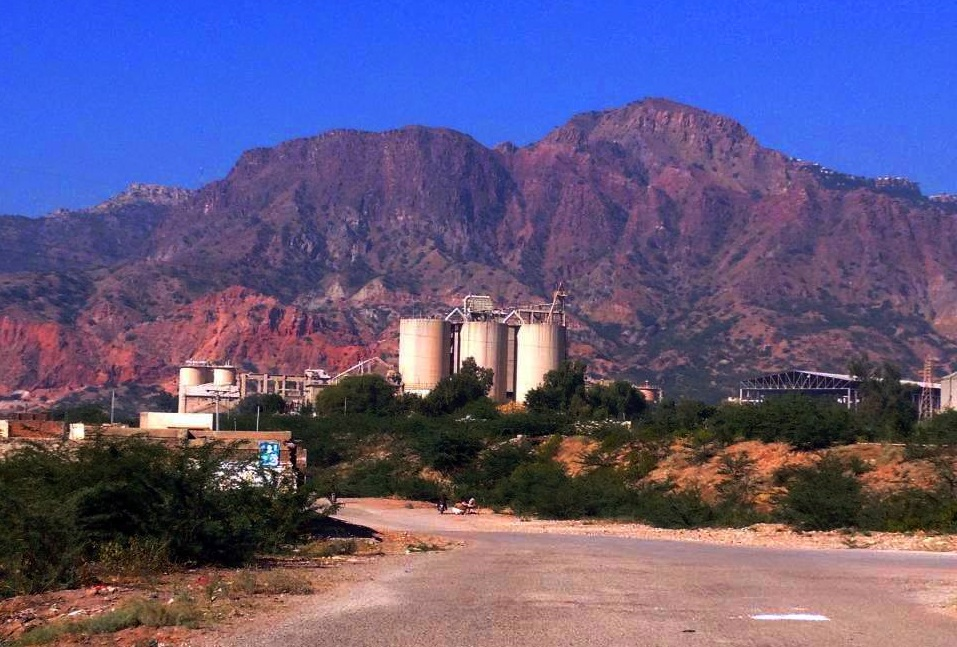
- Dandot RS Cement Factory

- Location of Dandot RS, in West Pakistan Shireen Abad (Dandot RS) (شیریں آباد (ڈنڈوت آر ایس (Pakistan)
- Coordinates: 32°38′19″N 72°58′37″E
- Country: Pakistan
- Province: Punjab
- District: Jhelum District
- Village: 1

Government
  - Type: Local Gov.
  - Chairman UC: Naseer Ahmed Khandowa (PTI)
- Time zone: UTC+5 (PST)
  - Summer (DST): +6
- Pakistan Post: 49064
- Area code: 0544

Shireen Abad (Dandot RS) ( Urdu شیریں آباد ڈنڈوت آر ایس ) is a village, union council Golepur, and administrative subdivision of Jhelum District (Urdu جہلم) in the Punjab Province of Pakistan. It is part of Pind Dadan Khan Tehsil.

== Location ==
It is located in the foothills of the Kohistan Salt Mountains at 32°38'20.2"N 72°58'37.1"E, 3 km east of the Dandot RS Khewra Salt Mine (or Mayo Salt Mine), 7 km north of Pind Dadan Khan. Me, Me, is located 31 km east of the Lilla Tobah interchange of the M2 Motorway and about 7 km from the banks of the Jhelum River, about 31 km east of the M2 Motorway and 2.5 km north of Dandot Chakwal. It is 92 km from Jhelum. It is bordered by Dandot Chakwal, Rakh Dandot, Khewra, Wara Buland Khan, Dhoke Vaince, and Choran.

== History ==
Kaala Teeashun (Dark Station) the name is a reference to the first railway station which was set up in the area by the British Raj to extract coal and gypsum in the early 1930s. Due to the abundance of gypsum, the prime raw material in cement production, this was a prime location to set up a cement plant. Thus began influx of workers and their families to the area. This included both skilled and unskilled workers; the former mostly worked at the cement plant whereas the latter were associated with numerous small-scale businesses, coal mines and gypsum quarries around the factory.

== Education ==
1. Govt Girls Primary School Shireen Abad (dandot Rs), Jhelum It is an Urdu medium Govt. School . It was established in 1942 .
2. Govt Elementary School Shereen Abad (Dandot RS), Jhelum It is an English medium Govt. School . It was established in 1945 .
3. Workers Welfare School D.C.C.L Housing Colony, Dandot R.S. Teh. Pind Dadan Khan, Dist. Jehlum,

== Zip Code ==
- Dandot R.S. Post zip code Jhelum, Punjab – North: 49064

== Cement Plant ==
1. In few years Ramkrishna and Jaidayal established six cement factories in, Dandot, Dalmia Cement Dandot Jhelum British Raj In the 1930s,
2. National Cement plants Dandot RS Jhelum Pakistan.
3. Dandot RS is a Jhelum And Dandot Is in Chakwal Board Line This Factory
4. Dandot Cement plant was installed in 1982 by State Cement Corporation of Pakistan

== Gallery ==
Dandot RS Images gallery

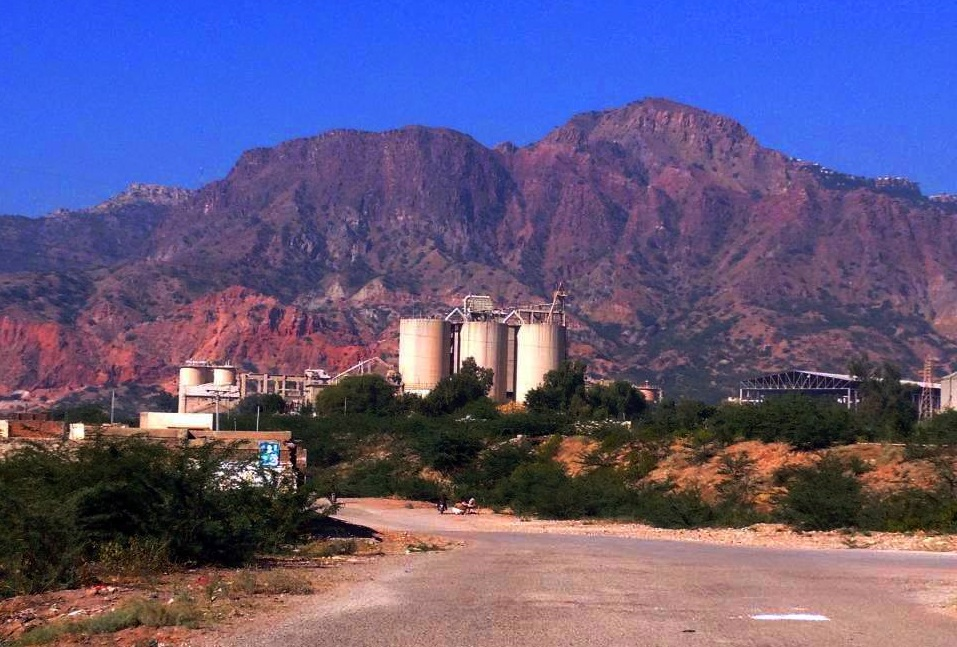
Dandot RS Dalmian Village a Good View By Chaudhry Muhammad Ehsan Khandowa

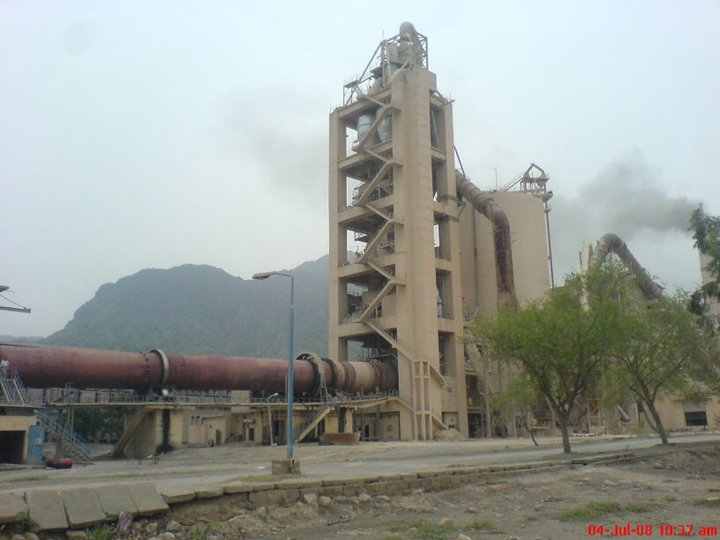
Good View A Dandot RS Cement Factory By Chaudhry Muhammad Ehsan Khandowa

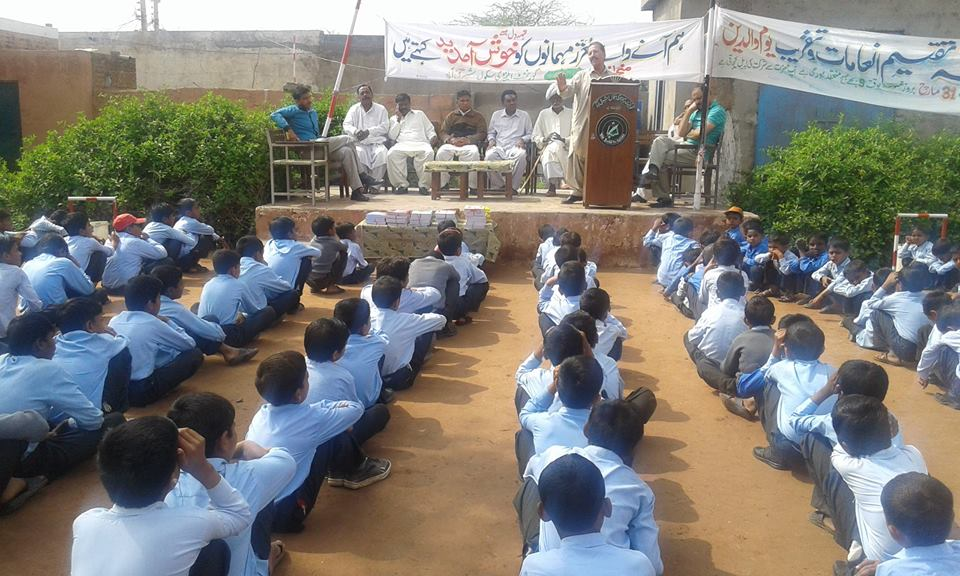
Govt Elementary School Shirin Abad Dandot RS-Dalmian View By Chaudhry Muhammad Ehsan Khandowa

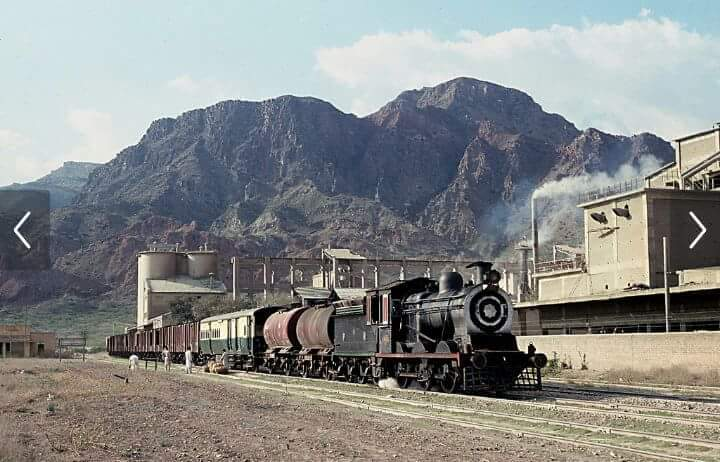
Dandot railway station in 1990 Old Pic View By Chaudhry Muhammad Ehsan Khandowa

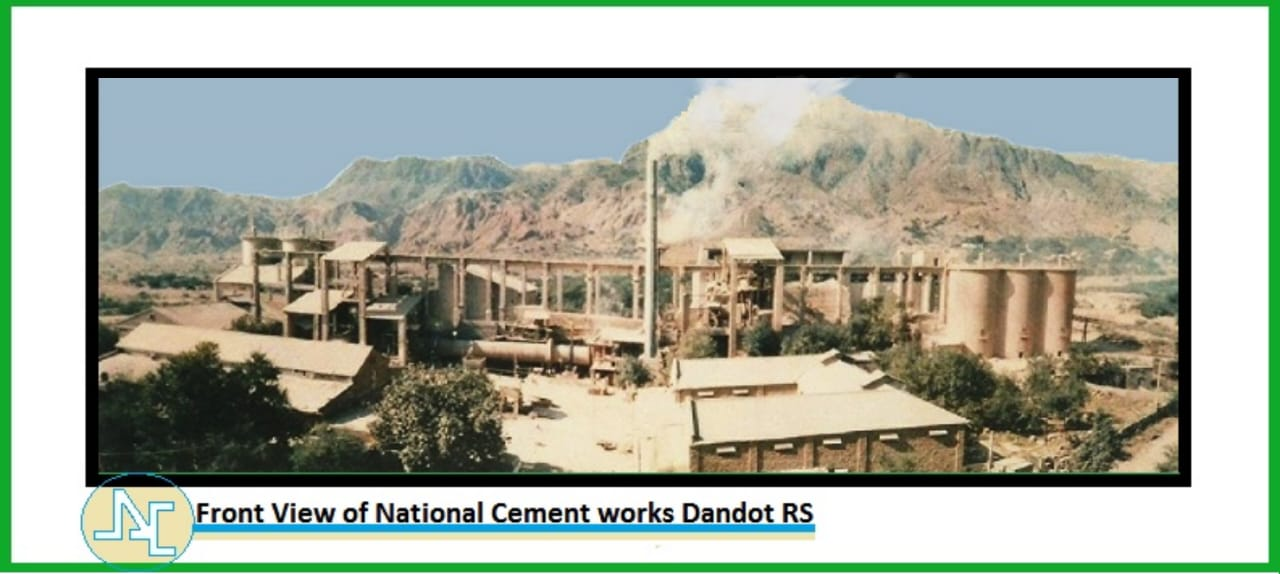
Front View of National Cement Works Dandot RS By Chaudhry Muhammad Ehsan Khandowa

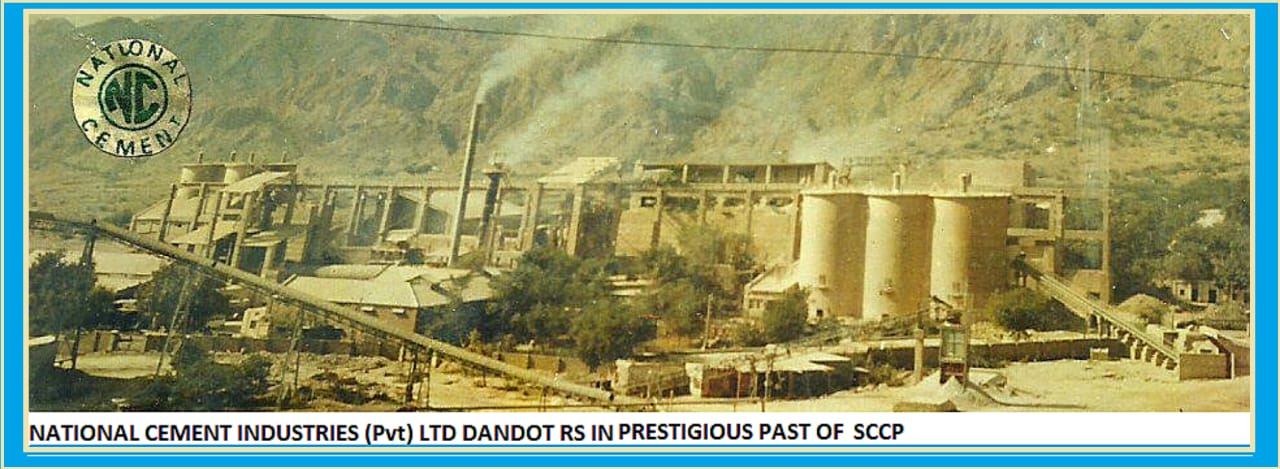
National Cement Industries (Pvt) Ltd Dandot RS in Prestigious of SCCP By Chaudhry Muhammad Ehsan Khandowa

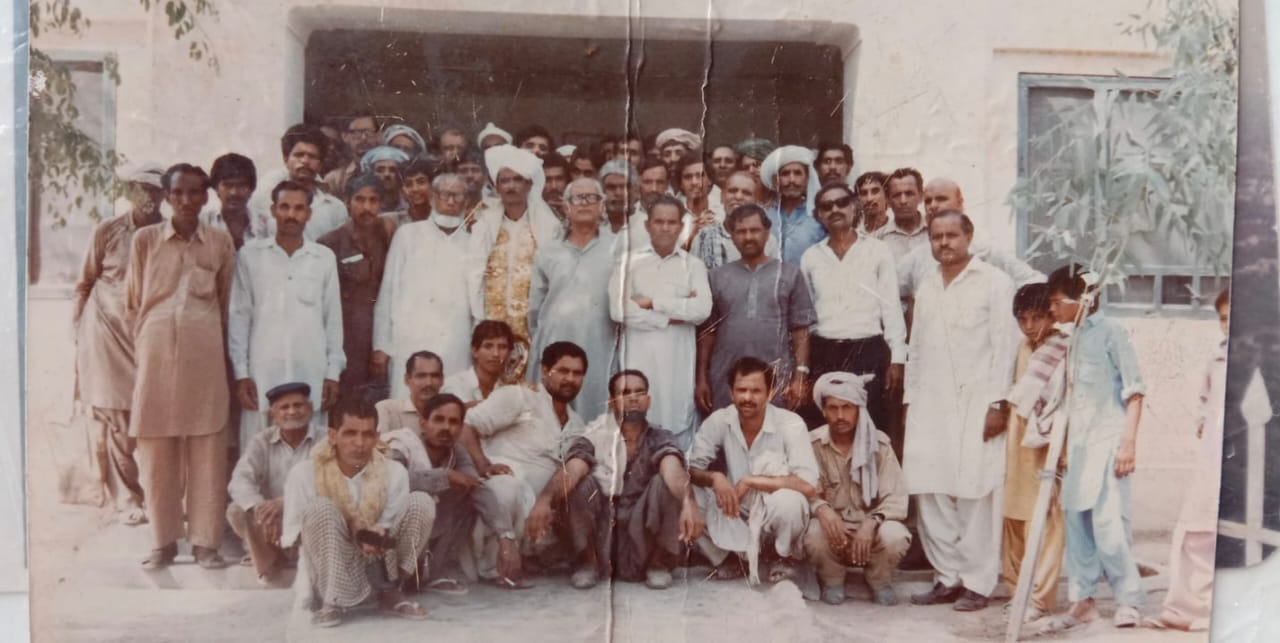
National Cement Industries (Pvt) Ltd Worker Dandot RS JhelumH By Chaudhry Muhammad Ehsan Khandowa

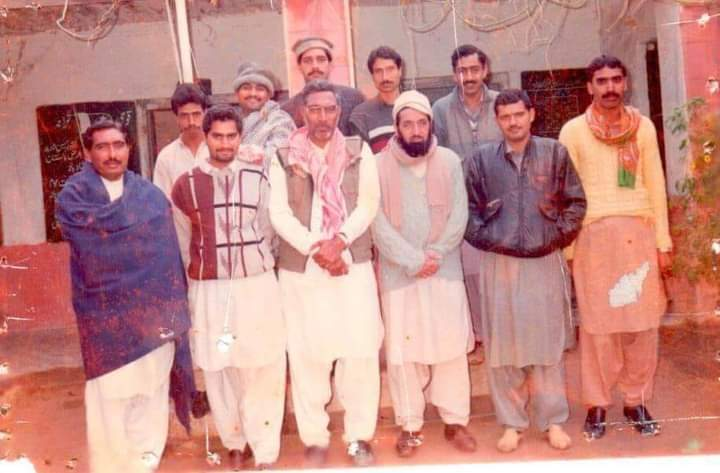
Government Elementary School Shirin Abad Dandot RS Jhelum By Chaudhry Muhammad Ehsan Khandowa

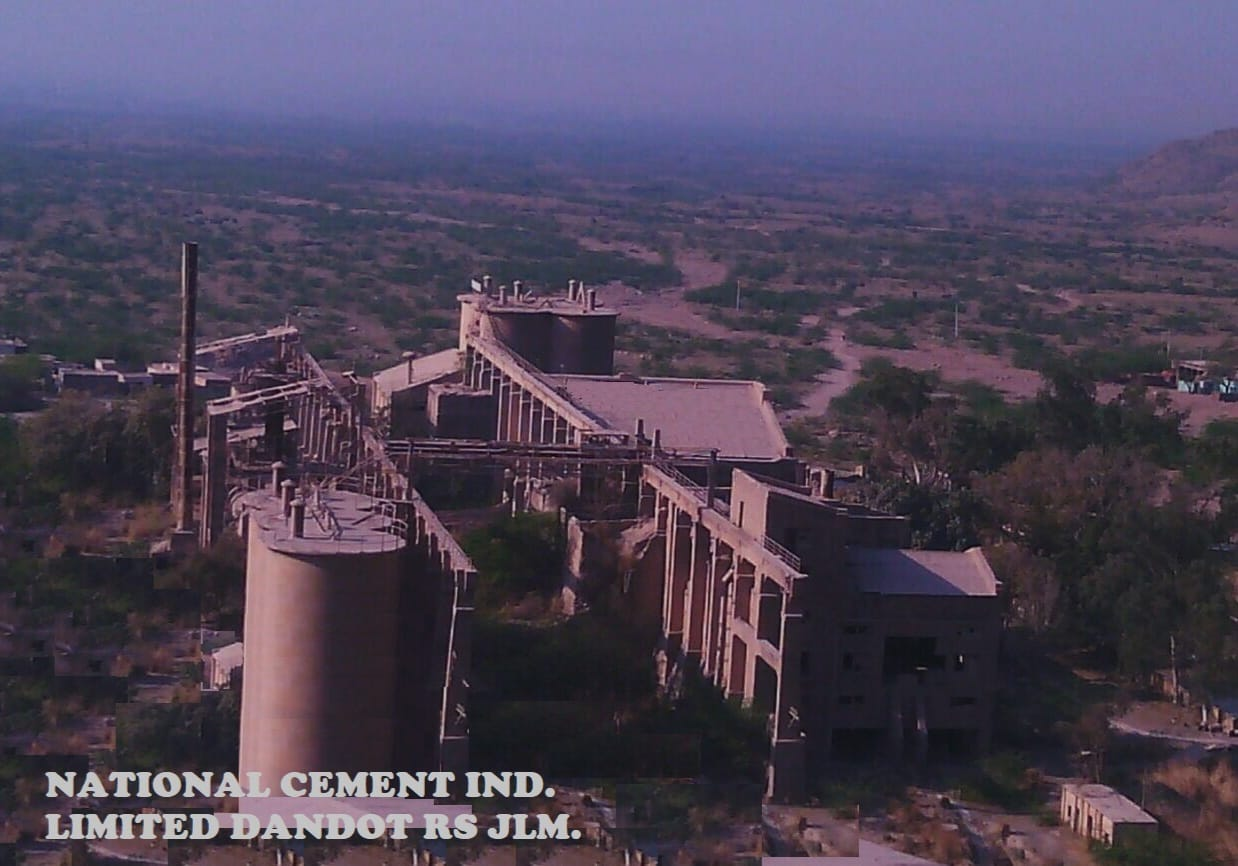
National Cement Industry Limited Dandot RS Jhelum By Chaudhry Muhammad Ehsan Khandowa

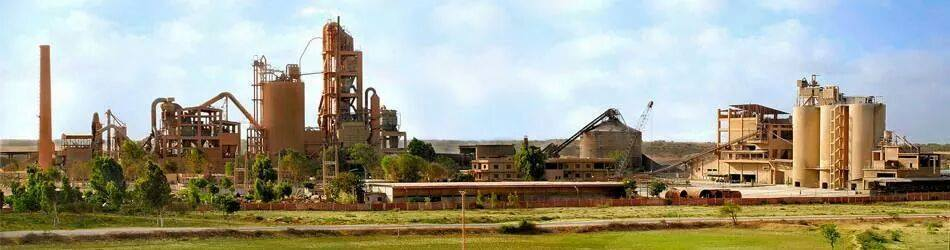
Dandot Cement Factory By Chaudhry Muhammad Ehsan Khandowa

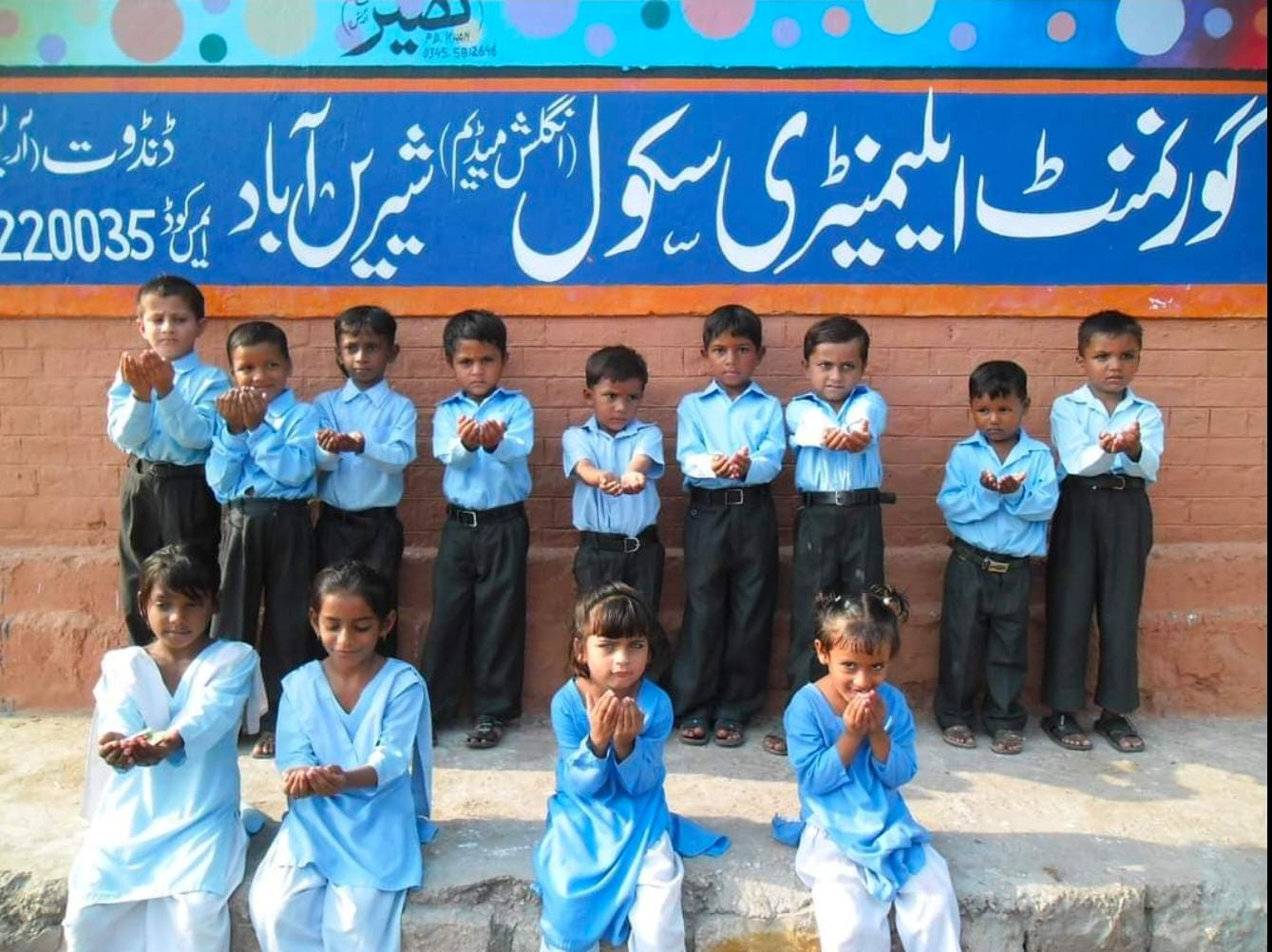
Govt Elementary School Shireen Abad (Dandot RS), Jhelum By Chaudhry Muhammad Ehsan Khandowa

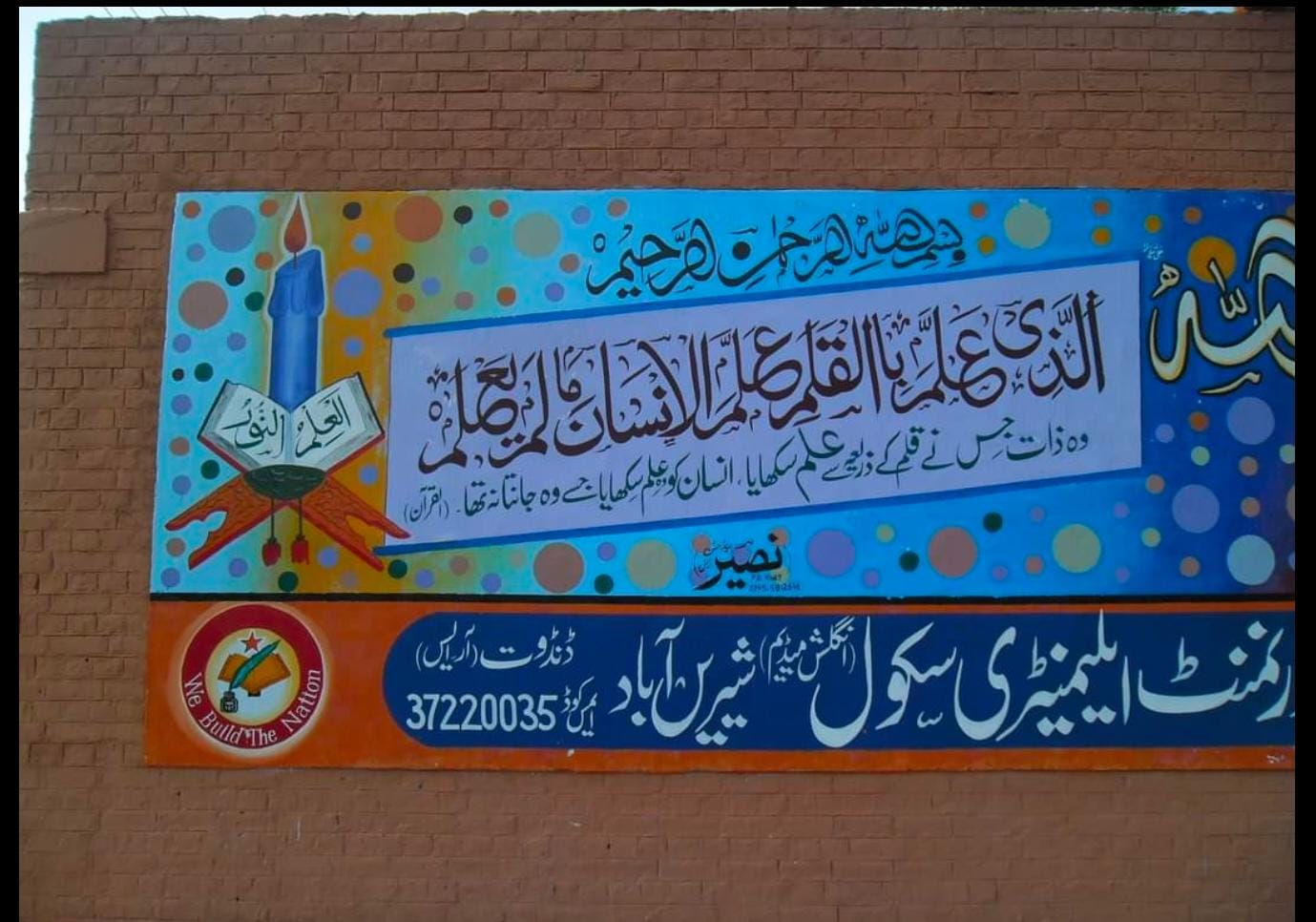
Govt Boys Elementary School Shireen Abad (Dandot RS), Jhelum 1 By Chaudhry Muhammad Ehsan Khandowa
