= Dhariala Kahoon =

- Village
- Interactive map of Dhariala Kahoon
- Coordinates: 32°46′0″N 72°53′0″E
- Country: Pakistan
- Province: Punjab
- District: Chakwal

Dhariala Kahoon is a village situated on a hilltop in the Kahoon Valley 13 kilometres from the centre of Choa Saidanshah in Chakwal District, Punjab, Pakistan. In a British Army documents of a soldier of this village, the name of village is mentioned as Dehri Kalan and post office of this village was in Dalwal.

== Location ==
It is one of the largest villages of the Kahoon Valley. Its neighbours include Dulmial and Tatral to the east, Dehri Sydan to the southeast, Arrar to the south, Maghal in the west, there are mountains situated on northern side of the village, with Surlah pass, which connects Kahoon Valley with City of Chakwal in Dhun area.

== Worship ==
The main thing which differentiates this village from its neighbours is the number of mosques in it. It has 11 mosques in total, which is far more than the other village of the valley. The Darbar Situated there Syed Madad Ali Shah, & ures Performed 10,11 Shaban every year.

== Village information ==
Its adjacent jungles are famous for a tree called Phoolai, a fragrant tree, and richness of the deer species called Hurial. Also found in wildlife are partridges, Cicies and rabbits. Cement factories in the Kahoon Valley have begun to affect the environment and social set up as labourers from outside the area along with Afghan refugees have migrated to the area.

Dhariala Kahoon is known for its contribution to the Armed Forces, almost every house has at least one person serving in Armed Forces of the country.
