= Dhoke Ajri =

Village in Pakistan

Dhoke Ajri is a village in Chakwal District, Punjab, Pakistan. It is about 20 km from Chakwal city on the Chowa Syden Shah Road. It is part of Jaswal Union Council.

Dhoke Ajri has basic amenities such as gas, electricity, and telephone connectionss, roads, and primary schools for boys and girls.
