= Saloi =

- Villages & Union Council
- Location within Punjab, Pakistan Location within Pakistan
- Coordinates: 32°44′42″N 73°05′44″E
- Country: Pakistan
- Province: Punjab
- District: Chakwal District
- Tehsil: Choa Saidanshah
- Villages in Union Council: 8

Government
  - Type: Local Gov.
  - Chairman UC: Mujtaba Haider Malik (PML-N)

Population
  - Population: 2,800
- Time zone: UTC+5 (PST)

Saloi is a village and union council of Chakwal District in the Punjab Province of Pakistan. It is part of Choa Saidan Shah Tehsil.

== Location ==
Saloi is located 35 km southeast of Chakwal city. It has a total population of 2,800. It is located in between mountains.

It was founded by Mehmud of Ghazni around a thousand years ago. The local language spoken in Saloi is Punjabi. The economy is based around agriculture.

== Villages in union council ==
Golepur Union Council is subdivided into 8 villages.

- Chanyana
- Kandla
- Kussak
- Mohra
- Ratuchah
- Saloi
- Takwan
- Wahali
