= Arra, Chakwal =

Ara, Pakistan
- Village and union council
- Country: Pakistan
- Region: Punjab Province
- District: Chakwal District
- Tehsil: Choa Saidan Shah

Government
  - Chairman: Ch Khaliq Dad
- Time zone: UTC+5 (PST)

Ara (Urdu: آڑا) is a village and union council of Choa Saidan Shah Tehsil in Chakwal District, Punjab, Pakistan.

It is located between Nandana Fort and Basharat village. Ara is 15 km (9.3 mi) from Basharat and 2 km (1.2 mi) from Nandana Fort

Villages in Ara include Dhok Chitti, Dhok Chatha, Dhok Dhamial, Dhock Lohara, Dhock Gujjar, Dhok Khathan etc.
