= Mushtaq Ahmed Baig =

General of Pakistan Army

Lieutenant General Mushtaq Ahmed Baig
- مشتاق احمد بیگ
- Born: Mushtaq Ahmed Baig; 21 December 1951; Lehr Sultanpur Village District Chakwal, Punjab, Pakistan.
- Died: 25 February 2008 (aged 56); Rawalpindi, Punjab
- Military career
- Allegiance: Pakistan
- Branch: Pakistan Army
- Service years: 1976 - 2008
- Rank: Lieutenant General
- Unit: Pakistan Army Medical Corps
- Commands: Surgeon General PAK Army Medical Corps; Director General Medical Services; Commandant Army Medical College
- Conflicts: Kargil War; Indo-Pakistani Standoff (2001); War in North-West Pakistan
- Awards: Hilal-i-Imtiaz

Mushtaq Ahmad Baig HI(M) (1951 – 25 February 2008) was the surgeon general of the Pakistani Army until his death from a suicide-bomb attack on 25 February 2008. He was an ophthalmologist by profession. Baig is the oldest senior Army officer to be targeted and killed since Pakistan's involvement in the war on terror and the North West-Pakistan Conflict. He is the most senior Pakistan Army general to have died in war since the death of Major General Iftikhar Khan Janjua in the Battle of Chamb.

== Early life and career ==
Baig was born in Lehr Sultanpur Village, Chakwal District, in 1951 to a middle-class family. He graduated from King Edward Medical University (KEMU) with a Bachelor of Medicine and Bachelor of Surgery (BMBS) in 1974. Two years later, Baig was granted a military commission, and was subsequently inducted into the Army Medical Corps. Baig completed his Master of Surgery (M.S.) degree and received a Doctorate of Ophthalmology from the Army Medical College (AMC).

After joining the Pakistan Army, Baig quickly climbed in rank as he excelled at various assignments. In 2003 he was promoted to major general, and made commandant of Army Medical College Rawalpindi (AMCR). Baig is credited for implementing revolutionary changes in the medical services in the Pakistani Armed Forces (PAF), following his death, the Chairman Joint Chiefs of Staff Committee praised Baig's contributions for overall improvement of the medical support to the Armed Forces of Pakistan. In 2006, Baig was awarded the second-highest military award, the Hilal-i-Imtiaz–Military. That same year, he was promoted to lieutenant general. In 2007, he was made the surgeon general of the Pakistani Army and was promoted to colonel commandant of the Army Medical Corps. His wife died on 10 August 2024.

== Assassination ==
On 25 February 2008, General Baig's vehicle was targeted by a suicide bomber. The suicide bomber, suspected to be linked to Al-Qaeda or the Taliban, struck when Baig's car was stopped at a traffic light on a busy road in Rawalpindi. The attack killed General Baig, the suicide bomber, and eight civilians, leaving twelve wounded.

== Aftermath ==
President Pervez Musharraf and care-taker Prime Minister Muhammad Mian Soomro strongly condemned the attack. The road was renamed as "Mushtaq Baig Shaheed Road" in honour of Baig.
