= Khandowa (clan) =

Punjabi tribe

Khandoya aka Khandowa کھنڈویہ
المعروف کھنڈوعہ خاندان

Languages
- Mother language Punjabi and National language Urdu

Religion
- Islam

Khandoya or Khandowa (Urdu/Punjabi: کھنڈویہ ، کھنڈوعہ, also spelled Khandowya and Khandowa) is a Punjabi Rajput sub-clan mainly present in the northern, central and western parts of the Pakistani Punjab, with significant numbers living in Jhang, Chakwal and to a lesser extent in Khandowa.

== History ==
According to their traditions, they are a clan of Chauhan Rajputs, who after wondering in from what is now Haryana settled in area near Chakwal in an area that had sweet water, which they called Khandoya or sweet water place. However, another tradition makes Khandoya an Awan, seven Arab generations removed from Qutb Shah, the ancestor of the Awan tribe. But most traditions make Khandoya a Chauhan Rajput.

On a rural level, Khandoya historically were of the zamindar or landowning class and many Khandowa families to this day live on and cultivate land, which their ancestors have held for centuries. They often carry titles typical to Punjabis who own tracts of ancestral land.

== Notable people ==
- Naseer Ahmed Khandowa former Chairman UC of the Khandoya tribe Golepur and Tehsil Pind Dadan Khan

== See also ==
- Kallar Kahar Tehsil
- Khandowa Chakwal
- Khandowa Pind Dadan Khan
