= Ratuchah =

- Villages
- Country: Pakistan
- Region: Punjab
- District: Chakwal District
- Tehsil: Choa Saidanshah
- Time zone: UTC+5 (PST)

Ratuchah is a village and union council of Chakwal District in Punjab, Pakistan. It is part of Choa Saidan Shah Tehsil.
