= Pidh, chakwal =

Coordinates: 32°41′N 72°58′E

Pidh
- Villages
- Interactive map of Pidh
- Country: Pakistan
- Region: Punjab
- District: Chakwal District
- Tehsil: Choa Saidanshah
- Time zone: UTC+5 (PST)

Pidh is a village and union council of Chakwal District in the Punjab Province of Pakistan. It is part of Choa Saidan Shah Tehsil.
