= Wara Buland Khan =

Village in Punjab, Pakistan

Coordinates: 32°37′N 73°01′E

Wara Buland Khan (Punjabi, Urdu: واڑہ بلند خان) is a small village near Khewra Town in Jehlum tehsil Pind Dadan Khan Punjab, Pakistan. The village is situated approximately 5 kilometres (3.1 mi) Northwest of Pind Dadan Khan on Choa Saidanshah-Pind Dadan Khan road. The largest caste is Awan.

The village was first settled by Buland Khan, who came from North Punjab with his ranch of sheep. In Urdu, “Wara” (واڑہ) means ranch, so the place became known among locals as Wara Buland Khan (Ranch of Buland Khan).

Since 1947, Chakwal was a part of District Jehlum. In 1985, Jehlum became a district with four tehsils. The district is administratively subdivided into four tehsils: Tehsil Jehlum, Tehsil Dina, Sohawa Tehsil, and Pind Dadan Khan Tehsil. It is located 90 km south-east of the federal capital, Islamabad.

== Facilities ==
There is a Jamia Mosque in the centre of the village. In recent census population of Wara Buland Khan is 1368. A government Primary school for boys and girls is also located here.
