= Pither Kalan =

Pakistani village

- Village
- Location in Pakistan
- Coordinates: 32°34′15″N 72°59′00″E
- Country: Pakistan
- Province: Punjab
- District: Jhelum

Government
  - Chairman UC: Dr Naseer Ahmed Khandowa (PTI)
- Time zone: UTC+5 (PST)
  - Summer (DST): +6

Pither Kalan is a village and union council of Jhelum District (Urdu جہلم) in the Punjab Province of Pakistan. It is part of Pind Dadan Khan Tehsil.
