= Chan Pur =

- Village
- Country: Pakistan
- Province: Punjab
- District: Jhelum

Government
  - Chairman UC: Dr Naseer Ahmed Khandowa (PTI)
- Time zone: UTC+5 (PST)
  - Summer (DST): +6

Chan Pur is a village and Union Council of Jhelum District (Urdu جہلم) in the Punjab Province of Pakistan. It is part of Pind Dadan Khan Tehsil.
