= Dulmial =

Dulmial دوالمیال
- Town
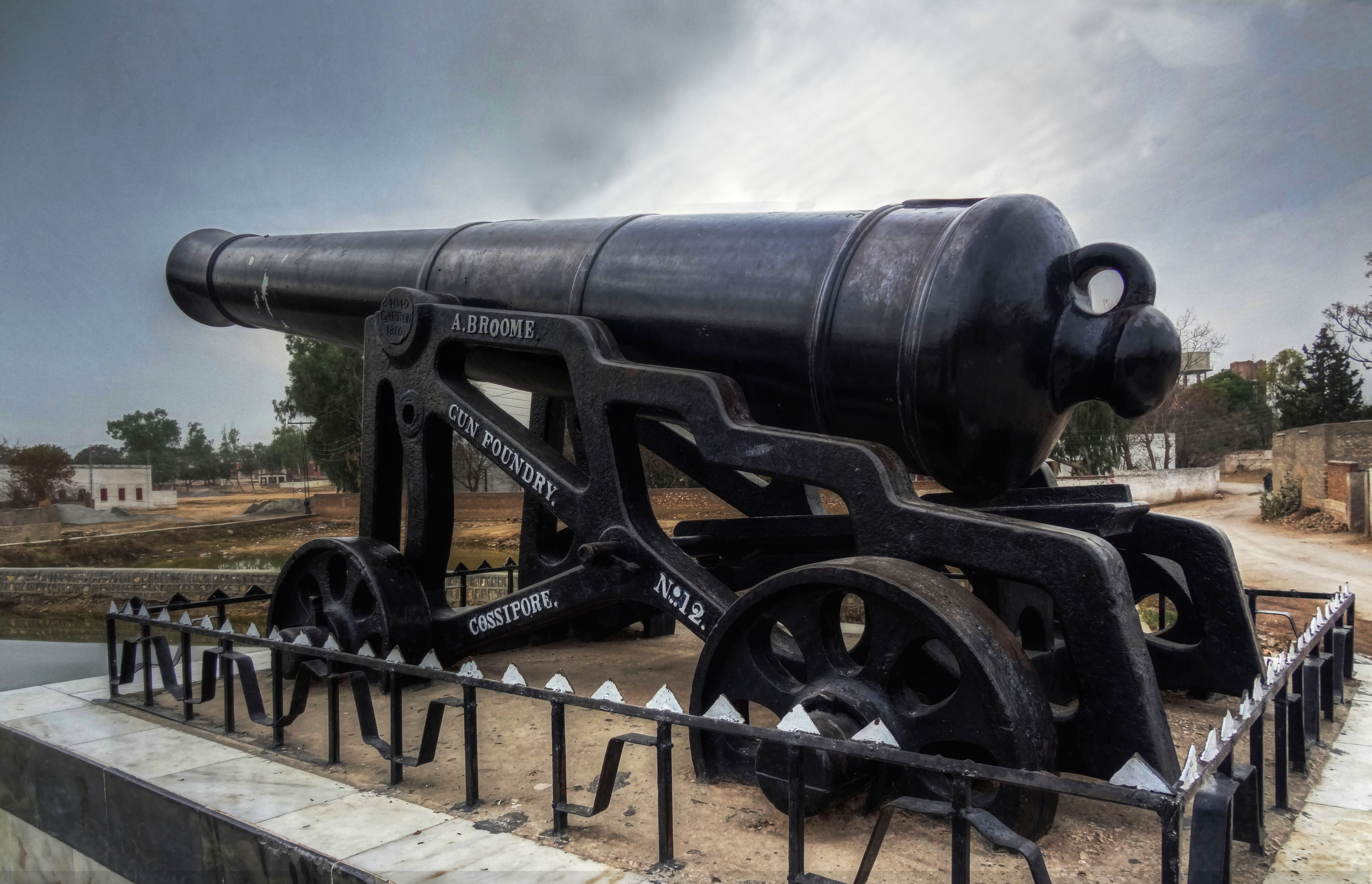
- Cannon awarded to Dulmial in 1925 by the British

- Location in Pakistan
- Coordinates: 32°44′0″N 72°55′0″E
- Country: Pakistan
- Province: Punjab
- District: Chakwal District

Population
  - Total: 30,000 approx.
- Time zone: UTC+5 (PST)
  - Summer (DST): +6
- Pakistan Post: 48330
- Area code: 0543

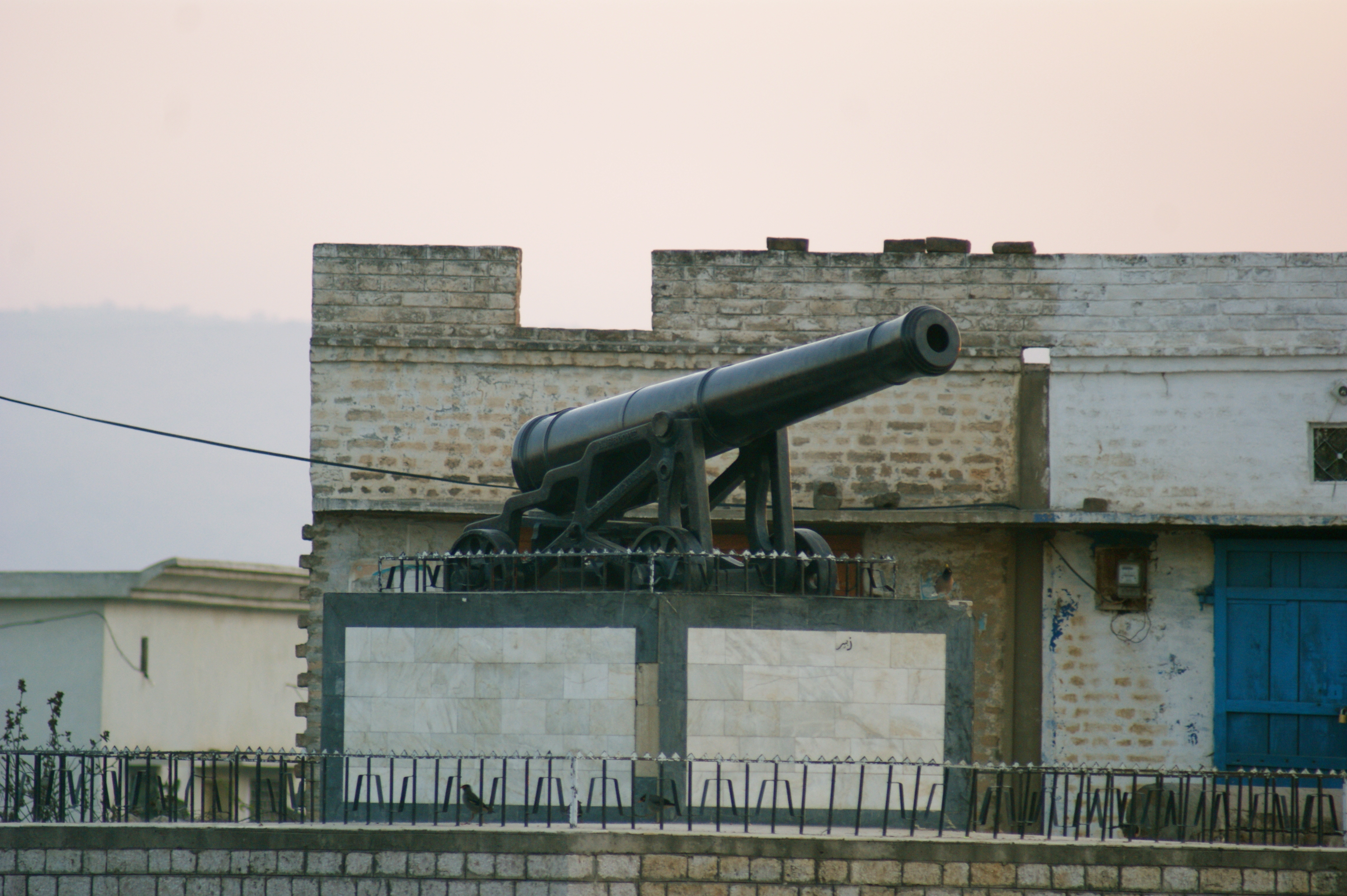
Cannon mounted at the entrance of the village

Dulmial (Urdu: دوالمیال) is a town and union council, an administrative subdivision, of Chakwal District in the Punjab Province of Pakistan. It is part of Choa Saidan Shah Tehsil and has a population of almost 30,000. Dulmial is known within Pakistan as the "village with the gun".

== Location ==
Dulmial is a village approximately 150 kilometres south of Islamabad. It is located on the road connecting Choa Saidan Shah and Kallar Kahar near the scenic Katas Raj Temples.

== History ==
Dulmial is known as the "village with the gun" and the "Home Town of Gunners". Since its foundation some eight centuries ago, the village has provided the largest number of army men to the state.

Dulmial village sent 460 soldiers to the British forces in World War I, the largest participation of any village in South Asia nine died. The village sent 732 soldiers to World War II.

A memorial stone was built in honour of the 460 soldiers on the premises of a primary school. In 1925, the British government presented Dulmial with a cannon in recognition of its World War I contributions; the award, chosen by a village representative, was transported from Jhelum first by train and then in a cart drawn by oxen. It was mounted at the entrance to the village with a plaque, and as a result Dulmial is known in Pakistan as "the village with the gun".

It was predominantly a Muslim village before the Partition Of India. After the Partition, it became part of Pakistan.

After the creation of Pakistan, Dulmial provided five lieutenant-generals and 23 brigadiers along with many other junior officers to the Pakistan Army.

== Gallery ==
Dulmial - A Pictorial View
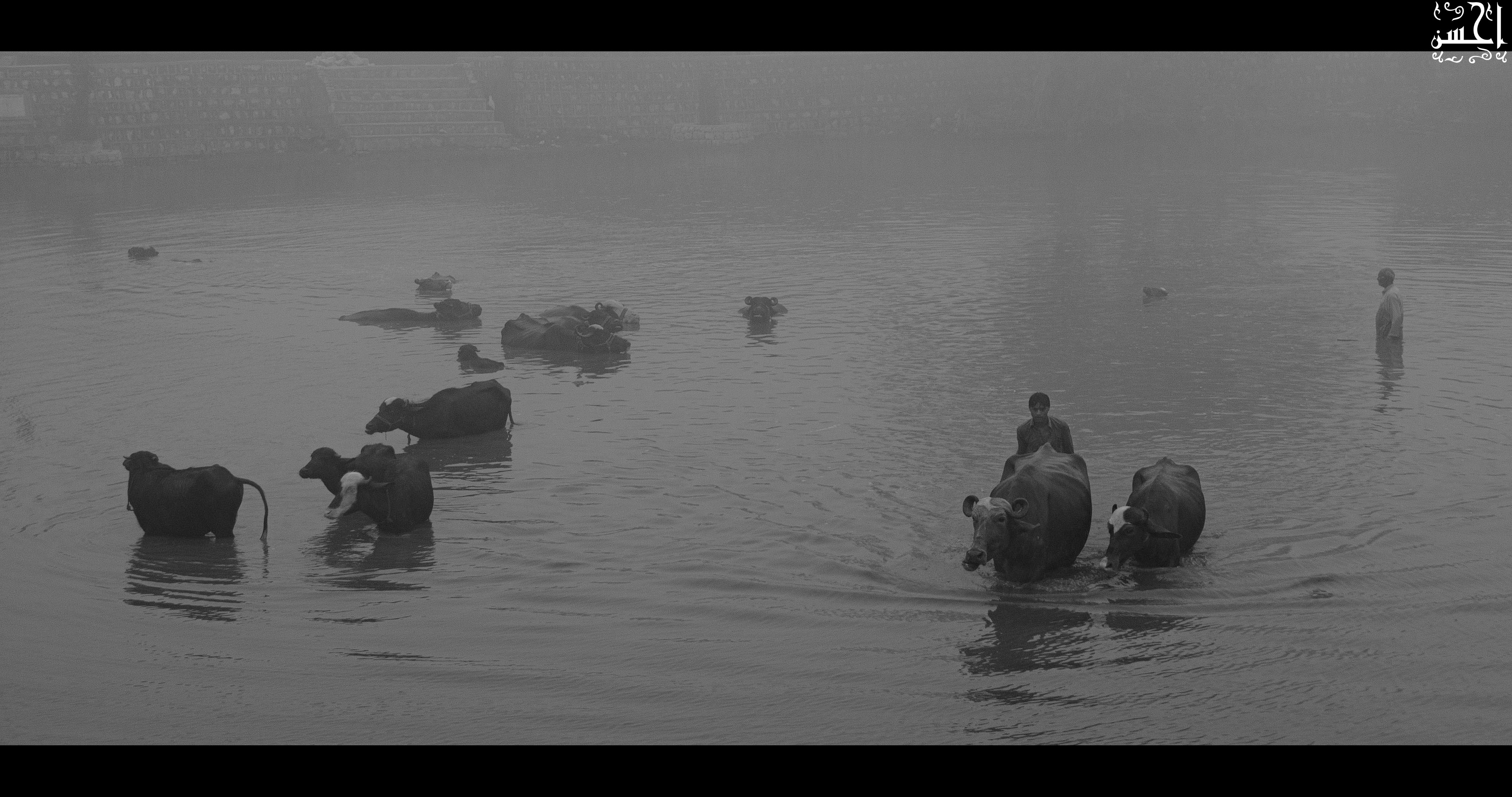
The Bann (pond)

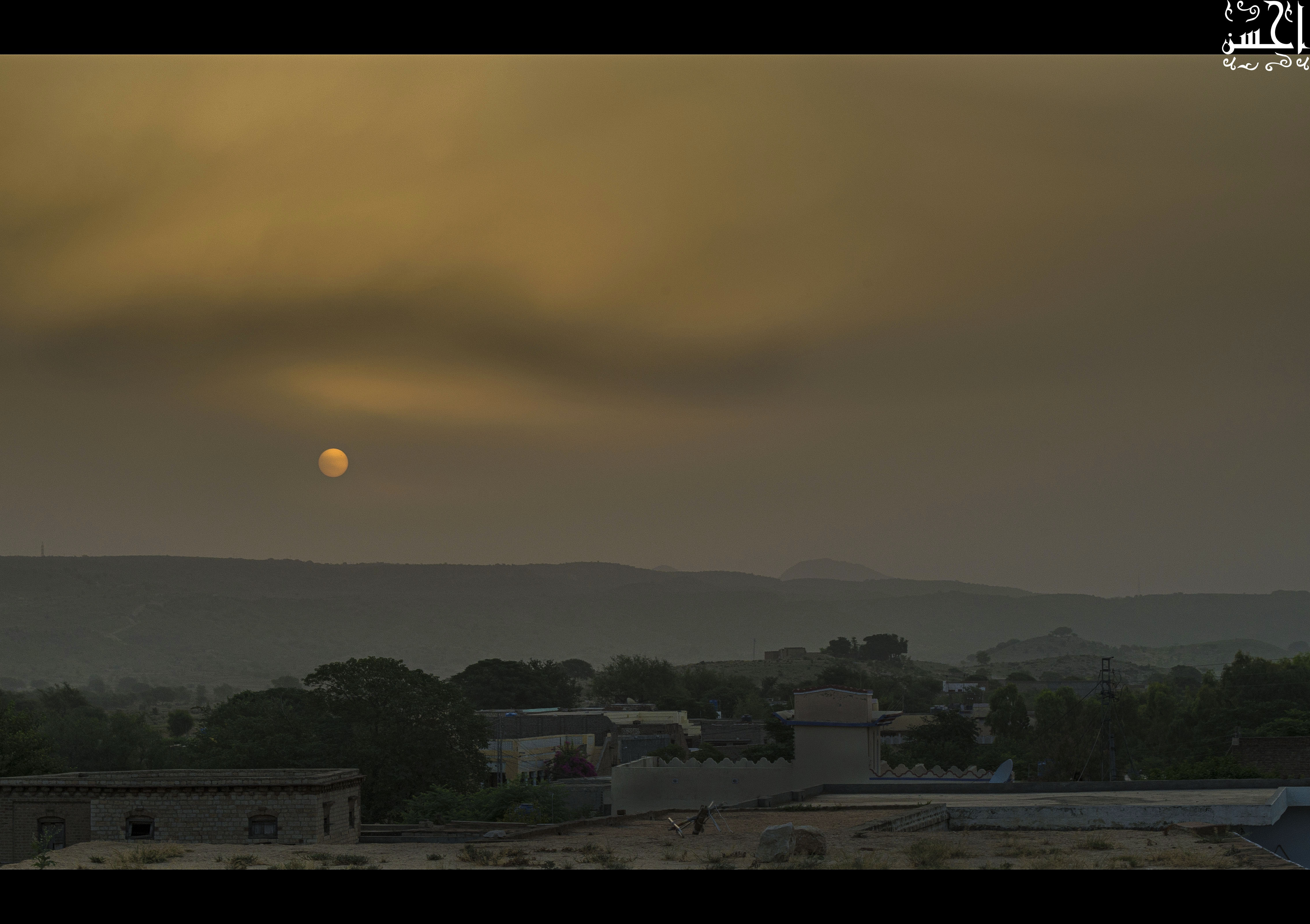
Sunrise in Dulmial

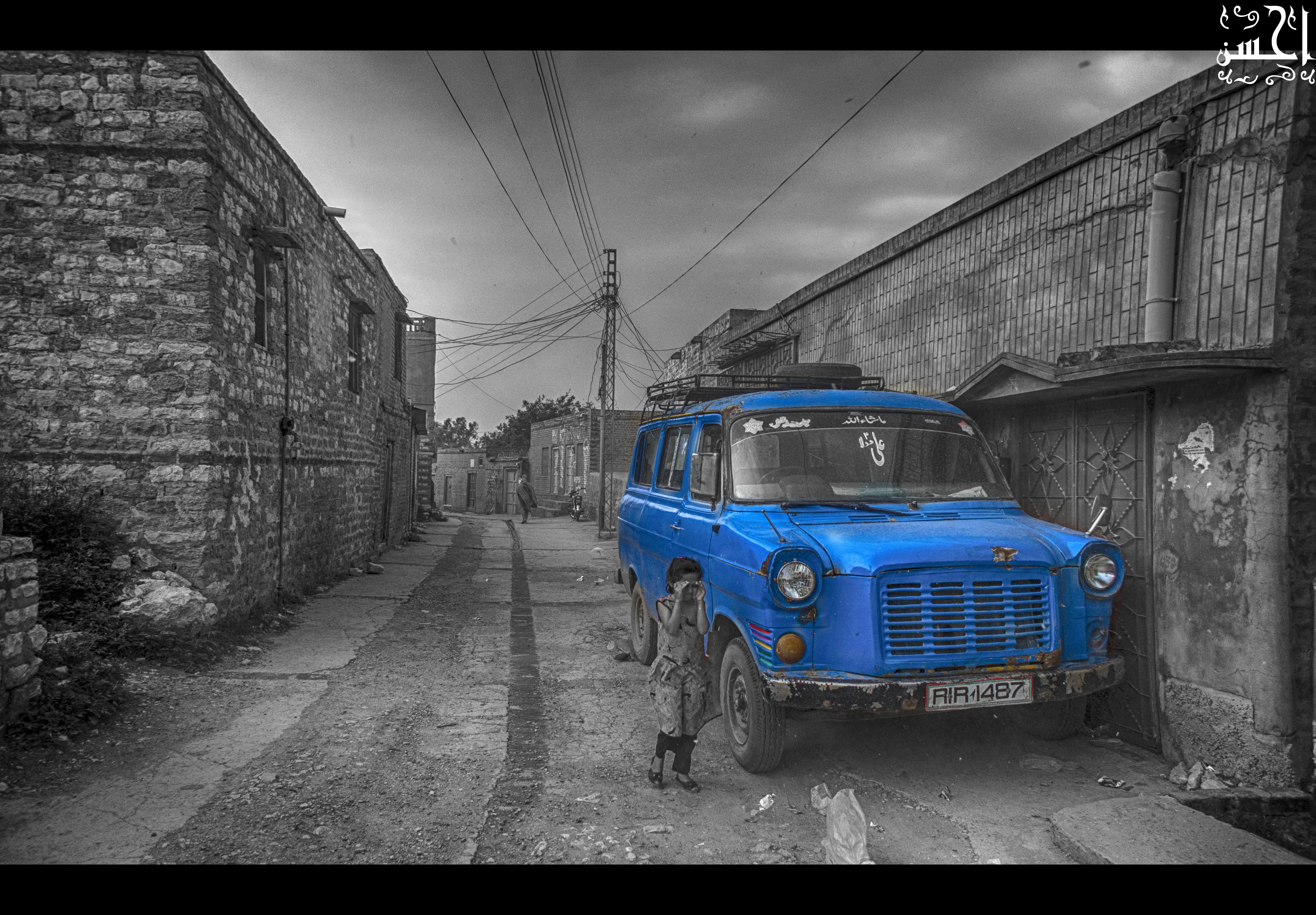
A Ford wagon in street

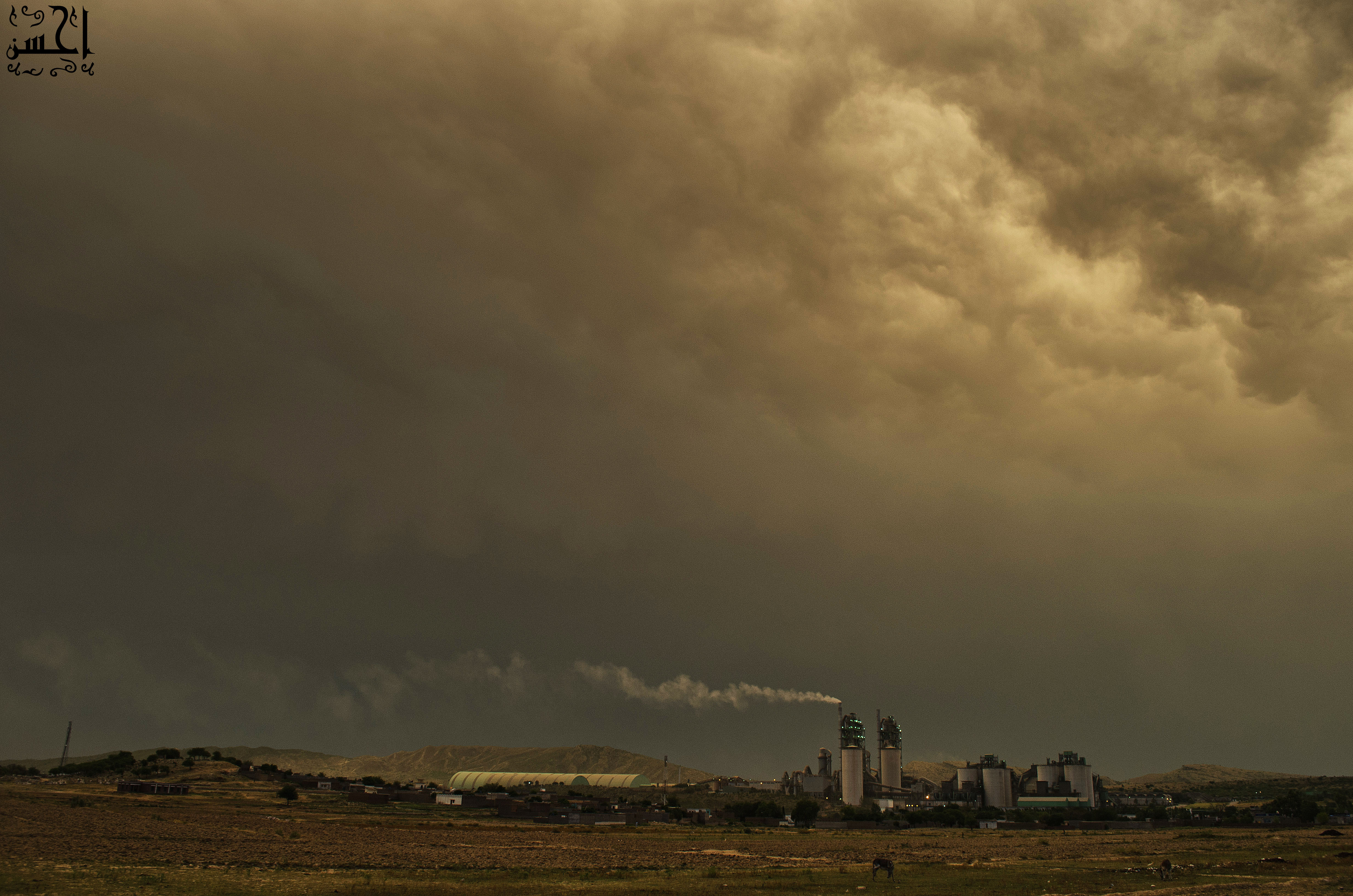
Bestway Cement Factory outside Dulmial

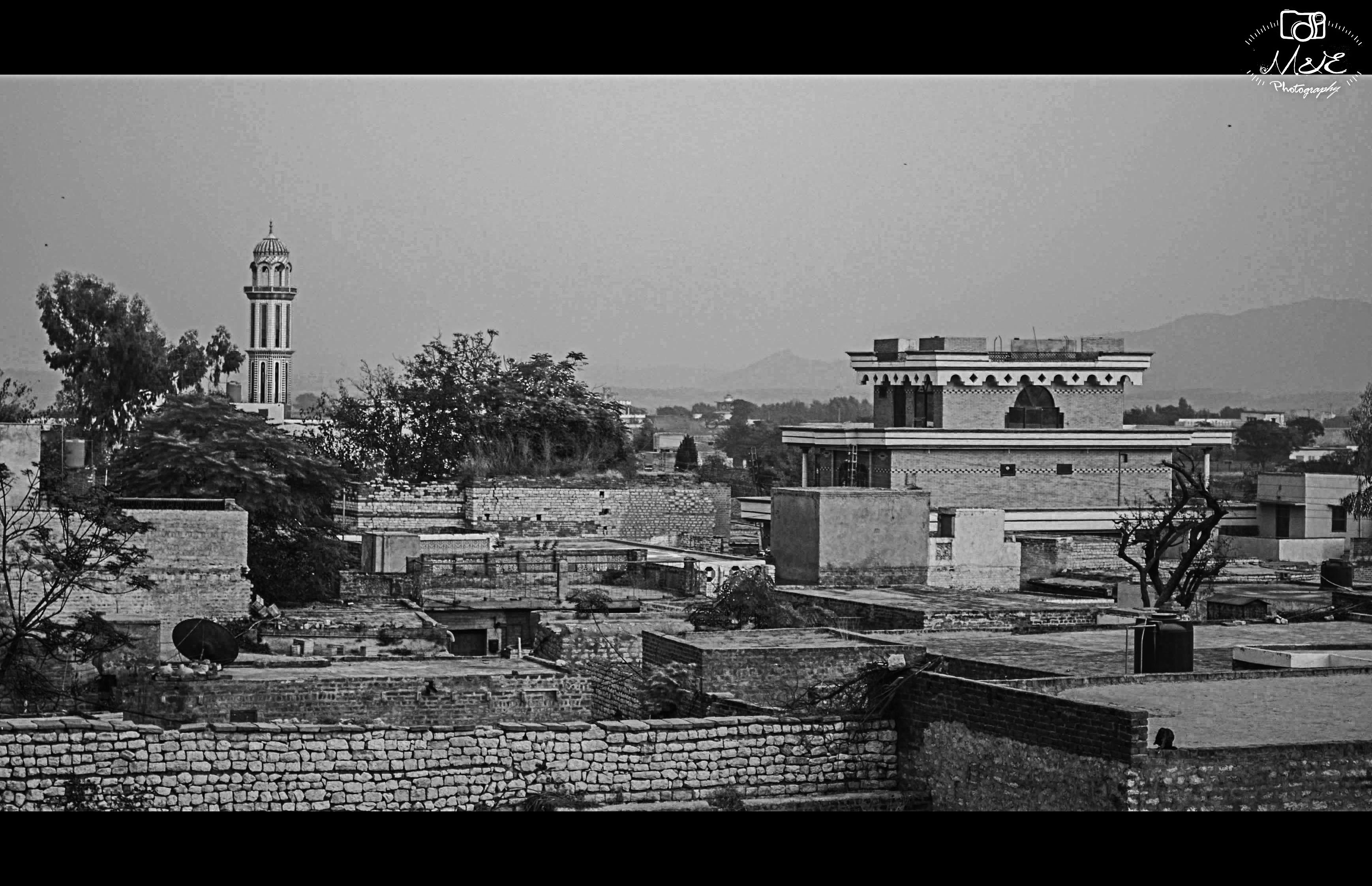
The Mohala 'Talli Paand'

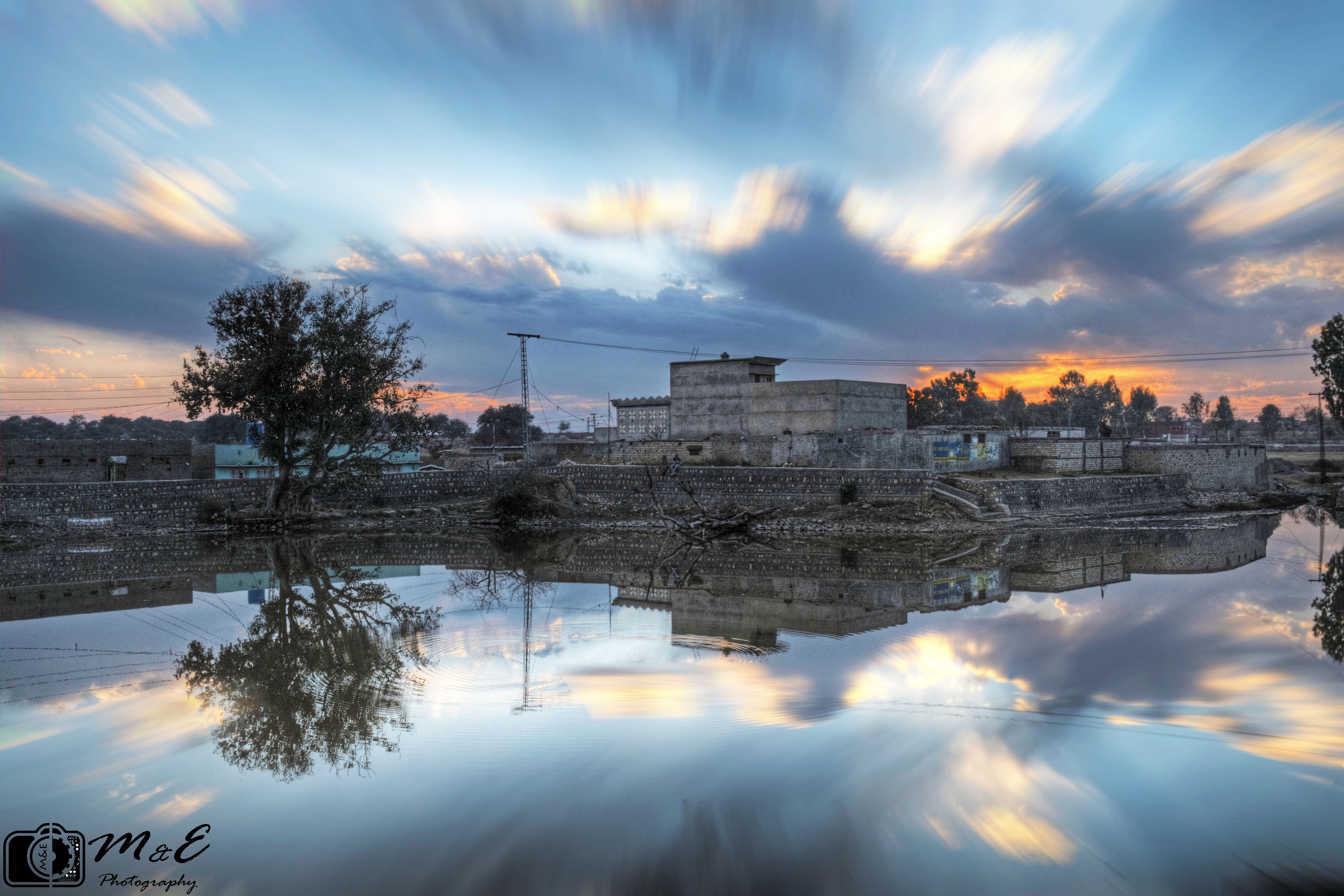
Sunset at the Bann

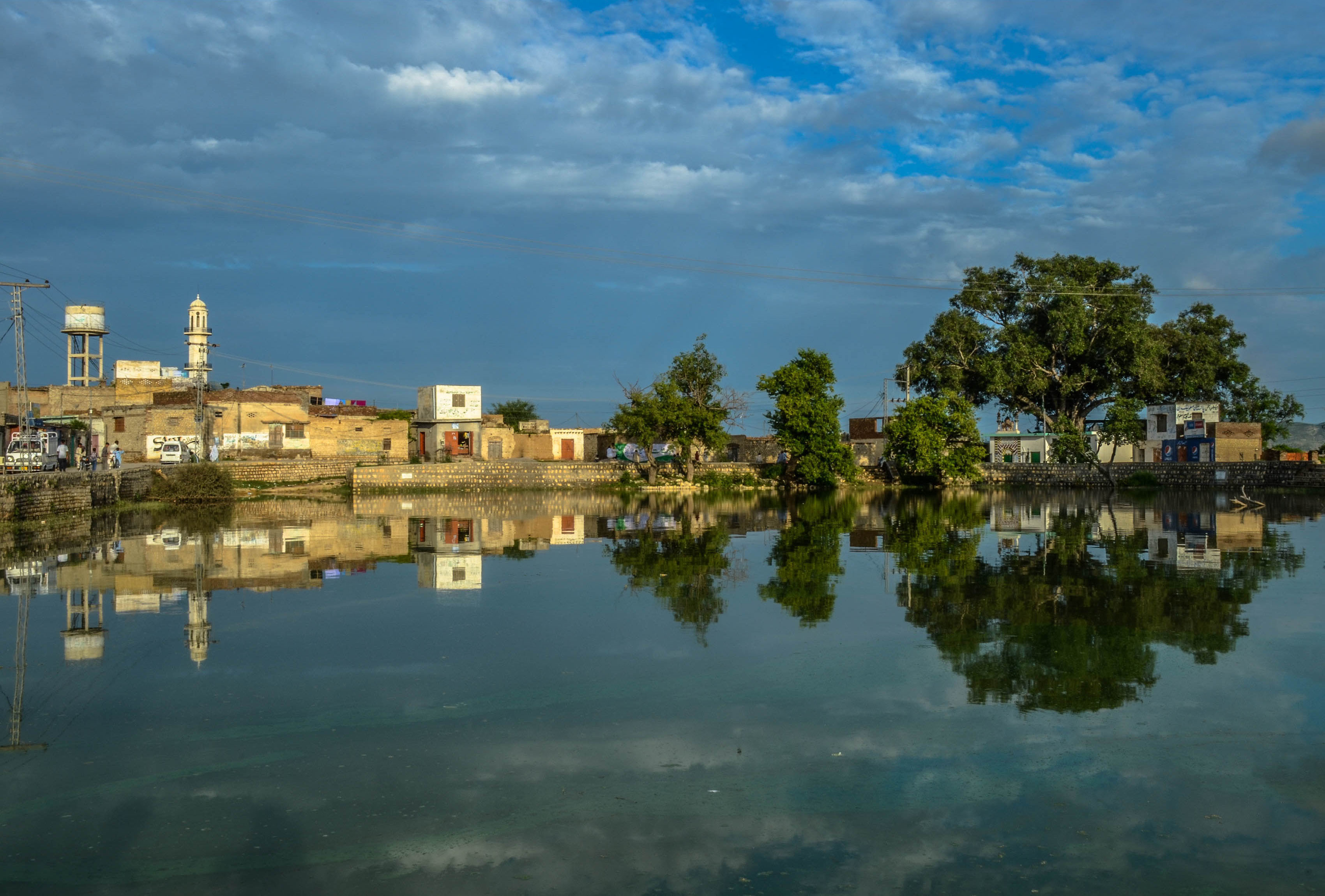
The Bann in spring

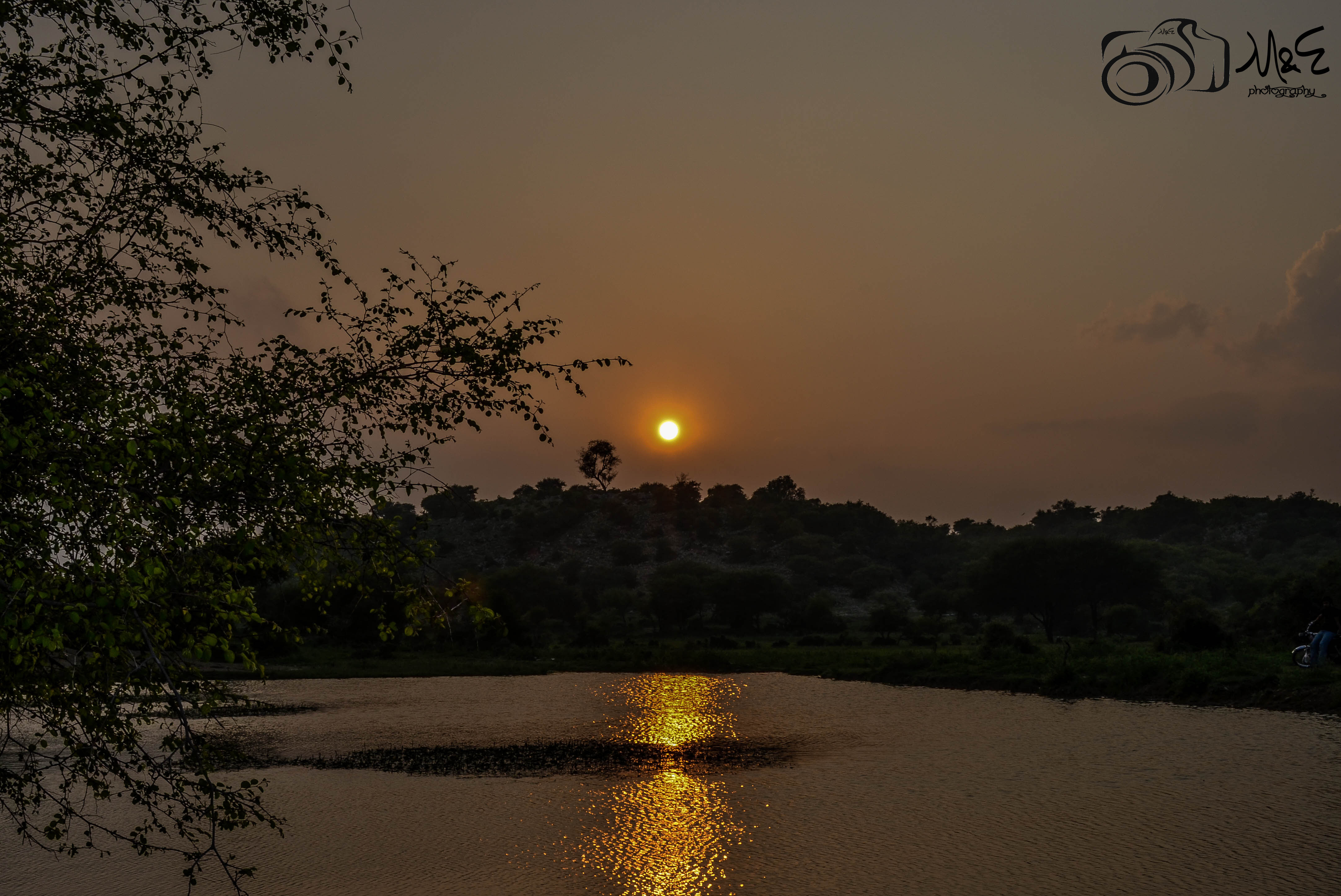
Sunset near Dulmial
