= Dandot =

- Village & Union Council
- ڈنڈوت
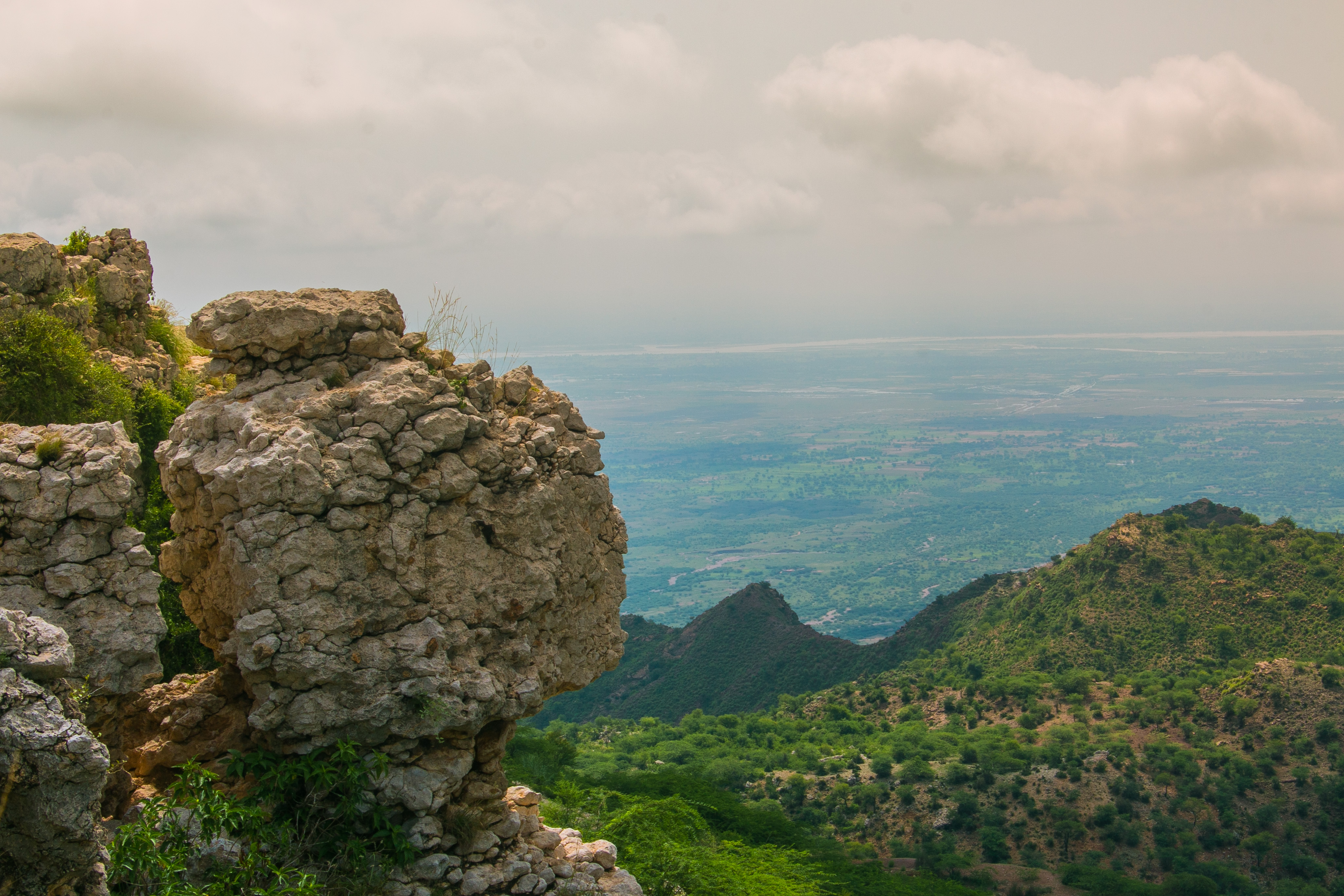
- Rocky View

- Location in Dandot, Chakwal District, Pakistan
- Coordinates: 32°39′30″N 72°57′30″E
- Country: Pakistan
- Province: Punjab
- District: Chakwal District
- Villages in Union Council: 2
- Time zone: UTC+5 (PST)
  - Summer (DST): +6

Dandot (Punjabi, Urdu: ڈنڈوت) is a village and union council of Chakwal District in the Punjab Province of Pakistan. It is part of Choa Saidan Shah Tehsil.

== Villages in Union Council ==
Dandot Union Council consists of 2 villages.

- Dandot
- Pidh Punjab
