= Choran =

Village in Punjab, Pakistan

Choran چوران
- Village
- Location in Pakistan
- Coordinates: 32°35′57″N 72°57′10″E
- Country: Pakistan
- Province: Punjab
- District: Jhelum
- Village: 1

Government
  - Type: Local Gov.
  - Chairman UC: Dr Naseer Ahmed Khandowa (PTI)

Population
  - Total: 4,700
- Time zone: UTC+5 (PST)
  - Summer (DST): +6

Choran (Urdu: چوران) is a village and union council of Jhelum District in the Punjab Province of Pakistan. It is part of Pind Dadan Khan Tehsil.

== Location ==
It is located at 32°35'57N 72°57'10E on the kilometres east from (6.0 km) of River Jhelum, the West from Choran the M2 motorway. lies (15.0 km) The Pind Dadan Khan Tehsil (10.0 km) from the east side of the Khewra salt mine (or (13.0 km) south of Mayo salt mine) is located in the east and is located 15 kilometers east of the M2 motorway's Lillah-Toba interchange.

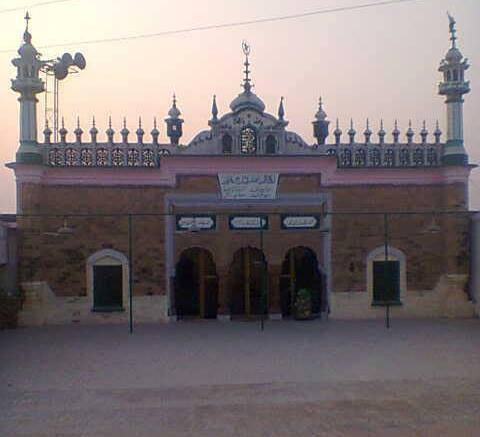
Choran Mosque (By Muhammad Ehsan)

== Dominant source of income ==
Agriculture is the usual source of income.

== People ==
Most people are from the Khandowa tribe and are employees in the Pakistan Army.

== Population ==
Approximately 5000 people reside in this town.

== Languages ==
The language spoken in Choran is Punjabi with blend of many dialects such as Wanhari, Pothohari, and Lunhari.

== Notable people ==
Naseer Ahmed Khandowa, politician
