= Pither Nadi =

Pakistani village

- Village
- Location in Pakistan
- Coordinates: 32°32′52″N 72°58′38″E
- Country: Pakistan
- Province: Punjab
- District: Jhelum District

Government
  - Chairman UC: Dr Naseer Ahmed Khandowa (PTI)
- Time zone: UTC+5 (PST)
  - Summer (DST): +6

Pither Nadi is a village, Union Council, and administrative subdivision of Jhelum District (Urdu جہلم) in the Punjab Province of Pakistan. It is part of Pind Dadan Khan Tehsil.
