= Hattar Jhelum =

- Village
- Location in Pakistan
- Coordinates: 32°34′20″N 73°00′12″E
- Country: Pakistan
- Province: Punjab
- District: Jhelum

Government
  - Chairman UC: Naseer Ahmed Khandowa (PTI)
- Time zone: UTC+5 (PST)
  - Summer (DST): +6

Hattar Jhelum is a village and union council of Jhelum District (Urdu جہلم) in the Punjab Province of Pakistan. It is part of Pind Dadan Khan Tehsil.

History of Hattar

When the first settlement started in mouza hattar,it was started by manba hattar,the ancestor of the Hattar tribe.

And the ancestor awan Khalan Malik Darya Khalan They belonged to khora Tehsil Noshehra district Khushab.His marriage took place in the house of Manba and he came from khora to Hattar

And progeny of Manba Hattar, continuing generation by generation, ended on bakhtawar, and various other tribe are also settled in hattar they came to this hattar at the time of Manba Hattar and took land from Manba Hattar and settled

The Tribe settled are Minhas raghar, shajral awan,and wains, they have been settled for about four hundred years.

Ancestor of Hattar tribe : Manba

Ancestor of Khalan awan :Malik Darya Awan

Ancestor of shajral awan : shah Muhammad

Ancestor of wains : Hayyat
