= Kora, Jhelum =

Kaura کوڑا
- Village and Union Council
- Location in Pakistan
- Coordinates: 32°35′38″N 72°56′36″E
- Country: Pakistan
- Province: Punjab
- District: Jhelum

Government
  - Type: Local Gov.
  - Chairman UC: Naseer Ahmed Khandowa (PTI)
- Time zone: UTC+5 (PST)
  - Summer (DST): +6

Kora (Urdu کوڑہ) is a village and union council of Jhelum District in the Punjab Province of Pakistan. It is part of Pind Dadan Khan Tehsil.
