= Lehr Sultanpur =

- Village and union council
- Country: Pakistan
- Region: Punjab Province
- District: Chakwal District
- Time zone: UTC+5 (PST)
- Postal code: 48400
- Area code: 0543

Lehr Sultanpur is a village and union council of Chakwal District in the Punjab Province of Pakistan. It is part of Choa Saidan Shah Tehsil. The village is actually composed of four smaller villages: Khoti, Dhoak Jalap/Warra, Lehr and Sultanpur. The population belongs to Mirza/Mughal and Janjua Rajput, Jalap tribes.
