= Basharat, Chakwal =

Basharat بشارت (Pothwari/Urdu)
- Location in Pakistan
- Coordinates: 32°47′0″N 73°6′0″E
- Country: Pakistan
- Province: Punjab
- District: Chakwal District

Population
  - City: 7,513
  - Urban: 2,310
  - Ethnicities: Predominantly Pahari-Pothwari
  - Religions: Predominantly Islam
- Time zone: UTC+5 (PST)
  - Summer (DST): +6
- Postcode: 48410

Basharat (Urdu: بشارت) is a village and union council of Chakwal District in the Punjab Province of Pakistan, it is part of Choa Saidan Shah Tehsil.

== Geography and Biodiversity ==
It is home to the Chehel Abdal Peak, the second highest peak in the Salt Range at the height of 3,701 ft, and tallest in the three districts of Chakwal, Jhelum and Mianwali.

The Ara-Basharat National Park was established here for biodiversity conversation and wild olive plantations have been carried out here. It is also one of the only places in Pakistan with Butea monosperma or "flame of the forest" trees. Ficus religiosa, Rose, Tulips, Jasmine, Morpankh and several other plant species (Note: including Lantana camara, Parthenium hysterophorus, Cannabis sativa, Calotropis procera, Melia azedarach, Chrysopogon serrulatus, Cynodon dactylon, Cenchrus ciliaris, Zizyphus mauritiana, Zizyphus nummularia, Dalbergia sissoo, Heteropogon contortus, Prosopis juliflora, Dodonaea viscosa, Justicia adhatoda and Acacia modesta) as well as the endangered Techomella undulata are also found here.

It is also one of the only places in Pakistan, home to the endangered Punjab urial. A population of endangered Indian pangolins is also found here. It is also home to significant populations of red fox and golden jackal. In June 2025, it faced severe rainfall and landslides during the 2025 Pakistan floods.

== Archeology and history ==
Fossils of Paleocene and Eocene dinocysts (Note: Areoligera sp, Cribroperidinium giuseppei, Diphyes colligerum, Homotryblium sp, Lejeunecysta sp, Muratodinium fimbriatum, Operculodinium sp, Wetzeliella astra, Polysphaeridium subtile, Spiniferites, Adnatosphaeridium multispinosum and Apectodinium hyperacanthum-paniculatum) have been discovered here and Spore-Pollen Biostratigraphy and Paleoecology of samples taken from Basharat dating to Mesozoic and Paleogene show the presence of several species. (Note: Psilodiporites hammenii, Triporopollenites cracentis, Triatriopollenites dubius, Cricotriporites vimalii, Echitriporites trianguliformis, Proxapertites sp. A, Proxapertites assamicus, Proxapertites operculatus, Proxapertites cursus, Proxapertites emendatus, Spinizonocolpites prominatus, Clavainaperturites cf. C. clavatus, Longapertites psilatus, Longapertites retipilatus, Longapertites discordis, Longapertites dupliclavatus, Longapertites aff. L. sahnii, Longapertites sp. F, Matanomadhiasulcites maximus, Brevitricolpites vadosus, Tricolpites reticulatus, Myrtacidites secus, Warkallipollenites medius, Rhombipollis geniculatus, Porocolpopollenites aff. P. ollivierae, Callophyllumpollenites aff. C. rotundus, Cupanieidites aff. C. flabelliformis, Cupanieidites flaccidiformis, Cupanieidites granulatus, Polygalacidites clarus, Retistephanocolpites sp., Dandotiaspora dilata, Dandotiaspora telonata, Lakiapollis ovatus, Psilodiporites bengalensis and Retitribrevicolporites matanomadhensis)

It has ancient Jain/Buddhist remains from between 1st and 12th century CE, showing the first era of Jain presence in the region. In 1971 Jain sculptures and artifacts were excavated and transferred to the Lahore Museum from here. A red sandstone slab with footprints was also found at Chehel-Abdal.

In the year 980 AD, Raja Mal immigrated from Jodhpur or Kannauj to Punjab, taking control of this area and founding Rajgarh, later named Malot. Thus, establishing the Janjua state. He had five sons, and the territory was divided amongst them with Raja Jodh taking the salt mines of Makrach and Makshala town, where he built a fort, and renamed the place to Makshala Makhiala. His four sons Raja Rahpal, Raja Sanspal, Raja Jaspal and Raja Jaipal, divided the territory further ruling from Kussak Fort, Nandana Fort, Malot Fort and Makhiala Fort. Raja Jaipal from Makhiala and his descendants were the ruler of this area and remained it's rulers until the Sikh Empire under Maharaja Ranjit Singh invaded and besieged the forts, forcing them to surrender. Basharat today still has significant Janjua presence, despite Awan being the dominant tribe today.

There is an alter, at the top of the mountain with its namesake being the Persian word "Chehel" meaning forty and “Abdal” being a stage to becoming the "trusted deputy of God", with mythology being that 40 pious brothers from Central Asia meditated for 40 days at this place. This claim is disputed by some as the alter might've been a place for ritualistic sacrifice to "Mother Earth" in pre-Islamic era. On Thursdays, a bazaar is set up here with goats and chickens, slaughtered and cooked.

The modern settlement of Basharat has been noted as "Bisharat" in British survey maps of the Salt Range, as far back as 1851-52.

== Mining Industry ==
It has a significant mining industry with several coal mines. Thus, it was also home to a significant immigrant Afghan population, working primarily in the coal mines, prior to the deportation of undocumented Afghans from Pakistan. Limestone is extracted the Sakeasar Limestone outcrops in Basharat, serving as a source of raw material for the nearby Gharibwal cement factory.

== Infrastructure ==
A rural health center was founded here in 2010 and was fully operational as of 2019. It also has a Higher Secondary School and a women's college. There is also a police post in Basharat.
