= Katas Raj Temples =

Hindu temple complex in Punjab, Pakistan

- کٹاس راج مندر
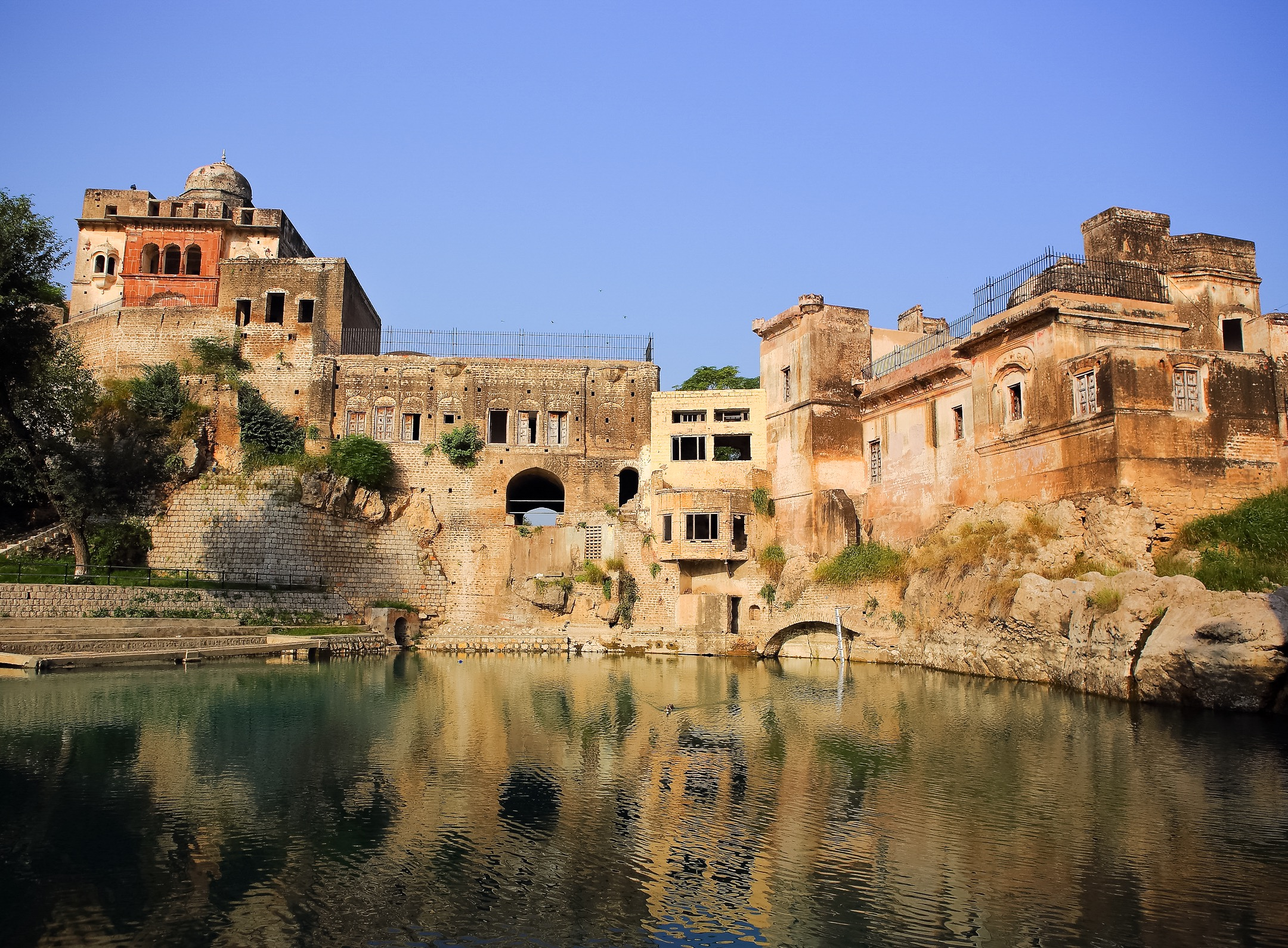
- The temples surrounding Katas Raj pond

Religion
- Affiliation: Hinduism
- District: Chakwal
- Deity: Shiva

Location
- Location: Choa Saidanshah
- State: Punjab
- Country: Pakistan
- Interactive map of Katas Raj Temples
- Coordinates: 32°43′26.4″N 72°57′05.9″E

Architecture
- Completed: 6th century CE onwards
- Temple: 12

The Katas Raj Temples (Punjabi, Urdu: کٹاس راج مندر) are a Hindu temple complex in the Salt Range of Punjab, Pakistan. The main complex is connected to one another by walkways and surrounds a pond named Katas which is regarded as sacred by Hindus, while another group, called Satghara, is present to southwest at some distance. The oldest temple dates back to 6th century CE. The site is believed to feature in Hindu mythological texts such as Mahābhārata and Puranas.

== Location ==
Katas Raj is located near Kallar Kahar in the Potohar Plateau of Punjab province at an altitude of 2,000 feet (610 m). The temples are linked to the M2 Motorway in municipal committee of Choa Saidanshah of the Chakwal District. It is approximately 100 kilometres away by road from another important Hindu pilgrimage destination—the Tilla Jogian complex.

== Etymology ==
The name of the temple complex is derived from the Sanskrit word kataksha, meaning "tearful eyes." The pond was originally referred to as Viskund, or "poison spring", but was later referred to as Amarkund, Chamaskund, and finally Katakshkund, meaning "Spring of tearful eyes." The pond in Urdu and Persian is referred to as Chashm-e-Alam, meaning "Sorrowful/Tearful Eyes."

== History ==
=== Prehistoric ===
The Salt Range has rich archaeological history. Prehistoric axes, knives made of granite, and artifacts like terracotta bangles and pottery have also been unearthed at Katas Raj. The latter have been found to be similar to those excavated in Harappa, but have not been dated.

=== Foundation ===
The 4th century CE Chinese monk, Faxian, described a temple at Katas Raj in his travelogues. The 7th century CE Chinese traveller Xuanzang visited the area and reported the existence of a Buddhist stupa dating to the era of the 3rd century BCE Mauryan emperor, Ashoka. The stupa was reported to be 200 feet tall, and surrounded by 10 springs.

Following the decline and fall of Turk Shahis, Hinduism gained traction in Gandhara under the reign of the Odi Shahi dynasty beginning around the 9th century CE. The Shahi dynasties established Hindu temples at Katas Raj from the mid 7th to 10th centuries, though the 19th century British archaeologist Alexander Cunningham dated the shrines to around 66 BCE. The Odi Shahi dynasty also funded construction of several other temples throughout northern Punjab, including the nearby Malot, Amb and Nandana, and Kafir Kot and Balot in present-day Khyber Pakhtunkhwa province.

=== Early Modern ===
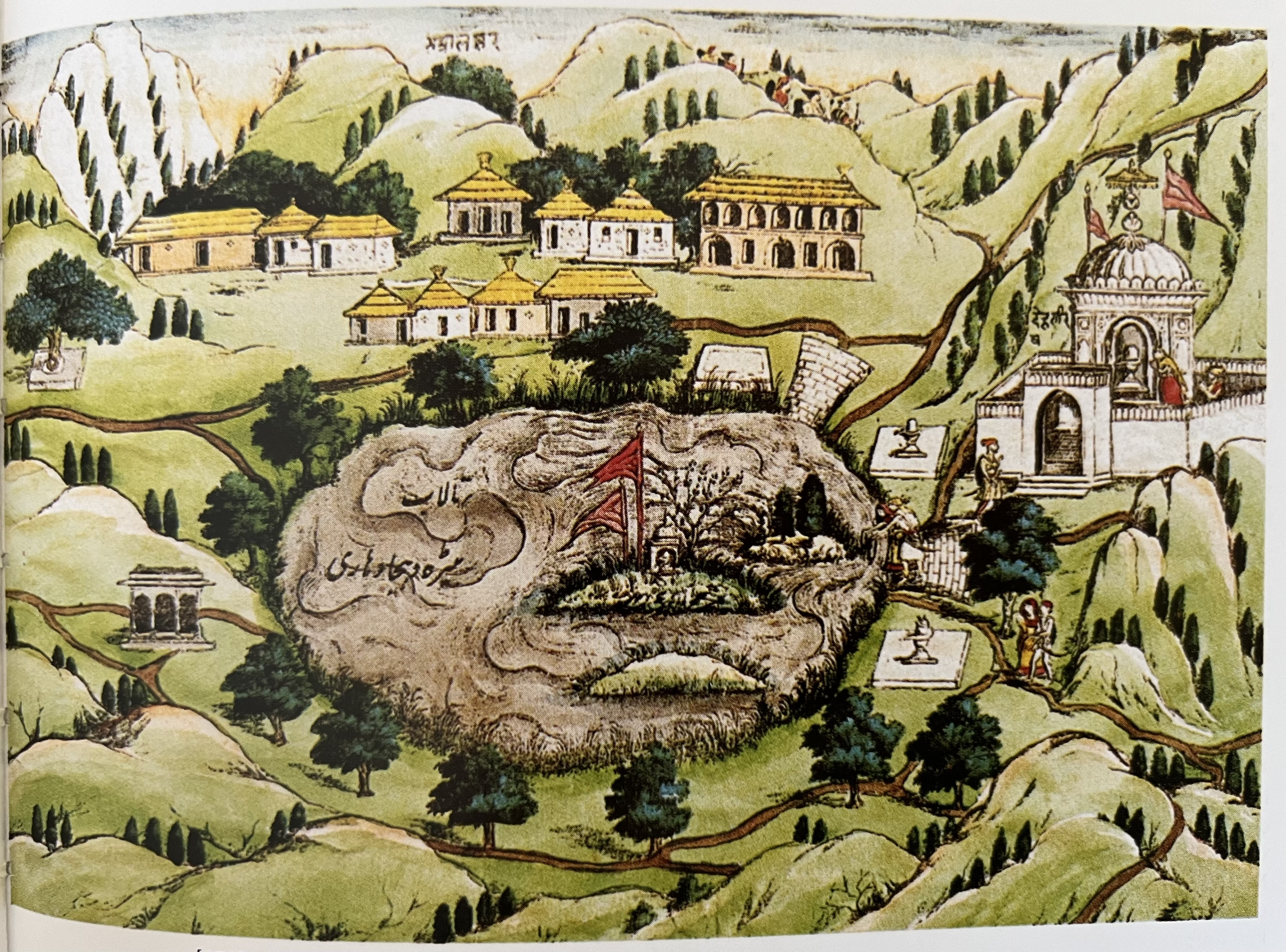
Possible painting of the pool and temples of the Katas Raj Temple Complex during Sikh-rule, from the Gulgashat-i-Punjab

The founder of Sikhism, Guru Nanak, is believed to have visited the Katas Raj Temples, as the site became a popular destination for ascetics. The Sikh emperor Ranjit Singh also regularly performed pilgrimage to the site. He visited the site for the Vaisakhi festival in 1806, in December 1818, and again in 1824.

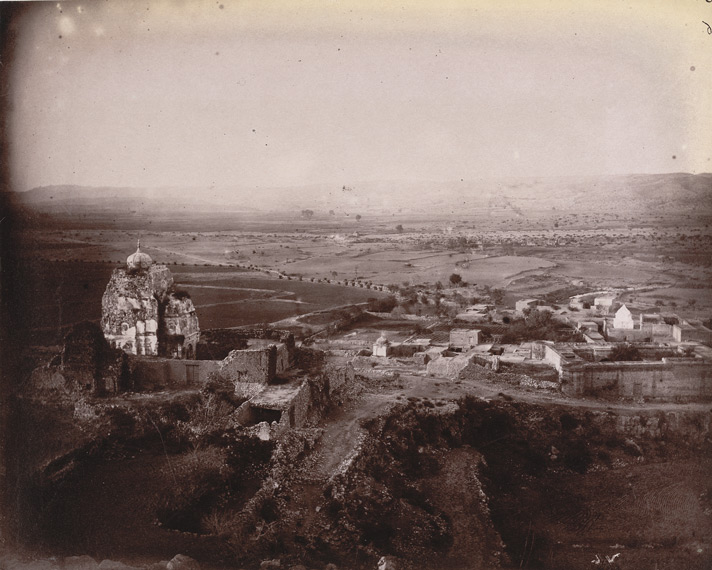
View of the temple complex in 1875

The complex was a well known pilgrimage site for Hindus prior to the 1947 partition of British India, with large numbers visiting for Maha Shivaratri. Following the partition, majority of the Hindu community left the region for India. The Indian pilgrims continued to visit the temple for the Maha Shivaratri festival until the Indo-Pakistani War of 1965, after which Indian pilgrims were barred from visiting again until 1984.

=== Modern ===
The temples fell into disrepair over the decades following Partition, and suffered neglect. Pakistani Hindus would continue to occasionally visit the site, but were unable to maintain the expansive complex. Indian Hindu pilgrims were forbidden to visit the site in 1956, 1960, and after the Indo-Pakistan war in 1965. Indian pilgrims were not permitted to visit the site again until 1984.

India's former Deputy Prime Minister Lal Krishna Advani visited the temples in 2005, and expressed displeasure at the site's dilapidated state. In 2005 Pakistan proposed to restore the temple complex, while in 2006 the restoration project began in order to clean the sacred pond, paint and restore some temples, and installation of informational blue boards around the temple complex. 300 Indian Hindus visited the site for the Maha Shivaratri festival in 2006, which for a short time became an annual tradition for some Indian pilgrims, though Indians were again barred after the 2008 Mumbai attacks. 2,000 Pakistani Hindus resumed the tradition of celebrating Maha Shivaratri at the temple in 2010, and another 2,000 in 2011 with visitors coming from as far as Karachi. A wedding for Hindu couples was arranged during that year's Maha Shivaratri festival for couples from Khyber Pakhtunkhwa province whose families had lost much of their property in the 2010 Pakistan floods.

In January 2017, Pakistani government began installation of shikharas on the temples. In February 2017, 200 pilgrims from India traveled to the temple to participate in the Katas Raj Dham festival. In 2025, Pakistan issued visas to 154 Indian Hindu pilgrims to visit Katas Raj dham.

== In Hinduism ==
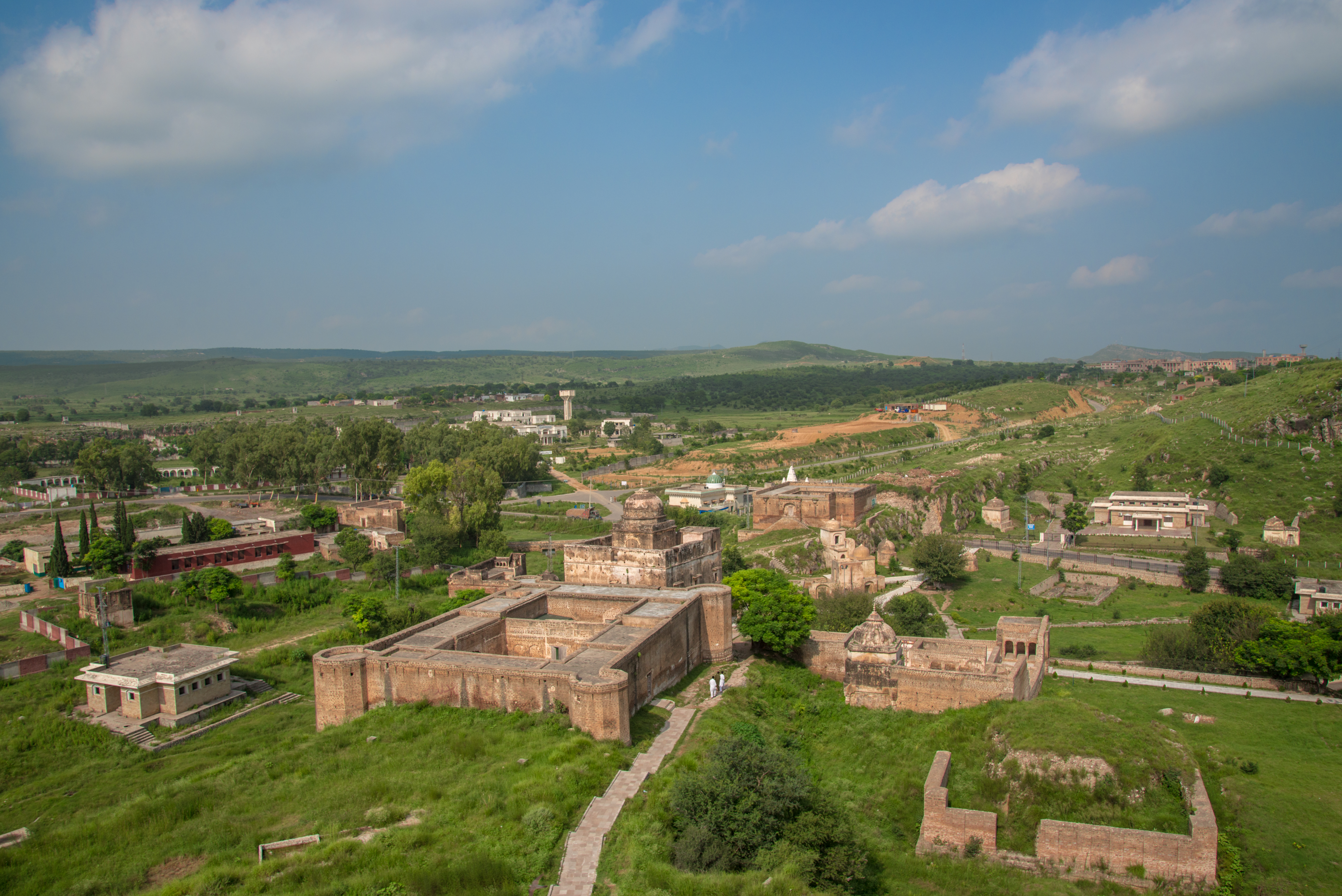
The complex consists of several temples and associated structures.

The temples are considered to be the second most sacred site in the historic Punjab region, after the temple at Jwalamukhi in modern Himachal Pradesh.

The Katās pond is said in the Puranas to have been created from the teardrops of Shiva, after he wandered the Earth inconsolable after the death of his wife Sati. The temples derive their holiness from the legend that following the death of his wife Sati, the Hindu god Shiva wandered inconsolably, while some of his tears collected in two ponds, one of which is the pond around which the Katas Raj Temples are set, while the other is at Pushkar, near the famous Sufi pilgrimage center of Ajmer. Another version of the legend mentions the two pools at Katasraj and Nainital. Another version of the Shiva legend involves the death of Shiva's horse Katas instead of that of Sati his consort.

The Satghara Temples at Katas Raj.

The temples play a role in the Hindu epic poem, the Mahābhārata, where they are traditionally believed to have been the site where the Pandava brothers spent a significant portion of their exile. It is also traditionally believed by Hindus to be the site where the brothers engaged in a riddle contest with the Yakshas, as described in the Yaksha Prashna. It is believed by Hindus that Pandavas engaged in a riddle contest with the Yakshas, as described in the Yaksha Prashna, before being able to drink from the pond. Four of the brothers failed and were rendered lifeless by the yaksha. The fifth brother, Yudhishthira, engaged the yaksha in a riddle contest and defeated him with his wisdom, thereby bringing his brothers back to life.

Some legends also state that the very first lingam was in Katas. Some old manuscripts also consider Katas as the janmabhumi (birthplace) of Hindu incarnation Rama, as well as that of Ayodhya; but this has become quite controversial. The oral tradition by local Hindus never mentioned it as being Rama's birthplace or celebrated in annual rituals. Another tradition states that the Hindu deity Krishna laid the foundation of the temple, and established a hand-made lingam in it.

=== Sacred pond ===
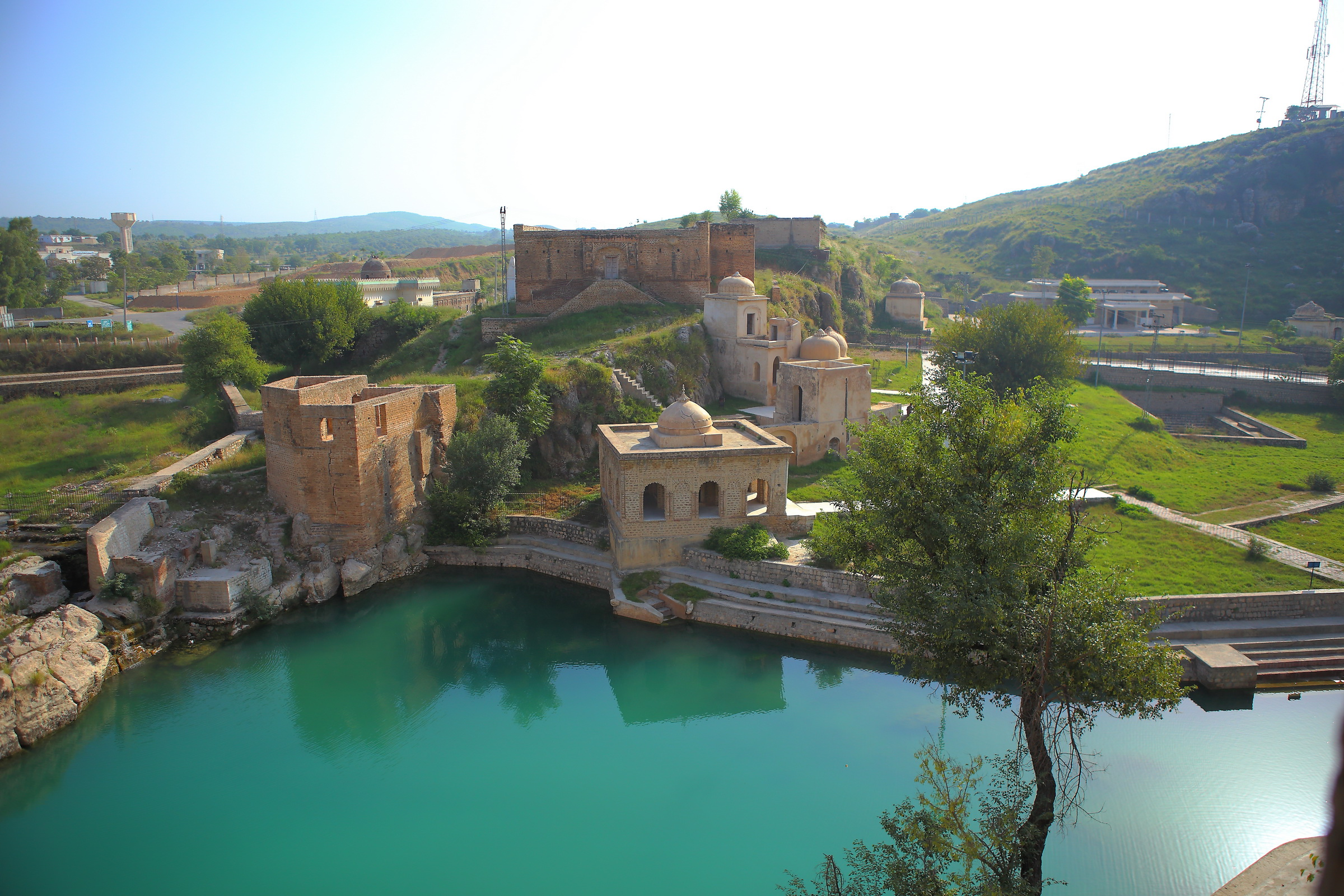
Katas Pond

The pond occupies an area of two kanals and 15 marlas, with a maximum depth of 20 feet. The pond in the complex is believed by Hindus to be filled with Shiva's tears after the death of his wife Sati. The water in the pond is of high clarity. The pond is associated with Shiva. In 2012, and again in 2017, water levels in the pond were noted to decrease because of water usage at a nearby cement factory, as well as the plantation of water-avid eucalyptus trees, that had lowered the area's water table. After the 2012 episode, the local cement factory was shut down by government authorities in order to restore water levels.

== Architecture ==
The Katas site houses the Satgraha, a group of seven ancient temples located at some distance from the pond, remains of a Buddhist stupa, five other medieval temples, and havelis scattered around a pond considered holy by Hindus.

The temples at Katas are mostly constructed on square platforms. The elevation of the sub shrines seems to form a series of cornices with small rows of pillars, crowned by a ribbed dome.

=== Satghara ===
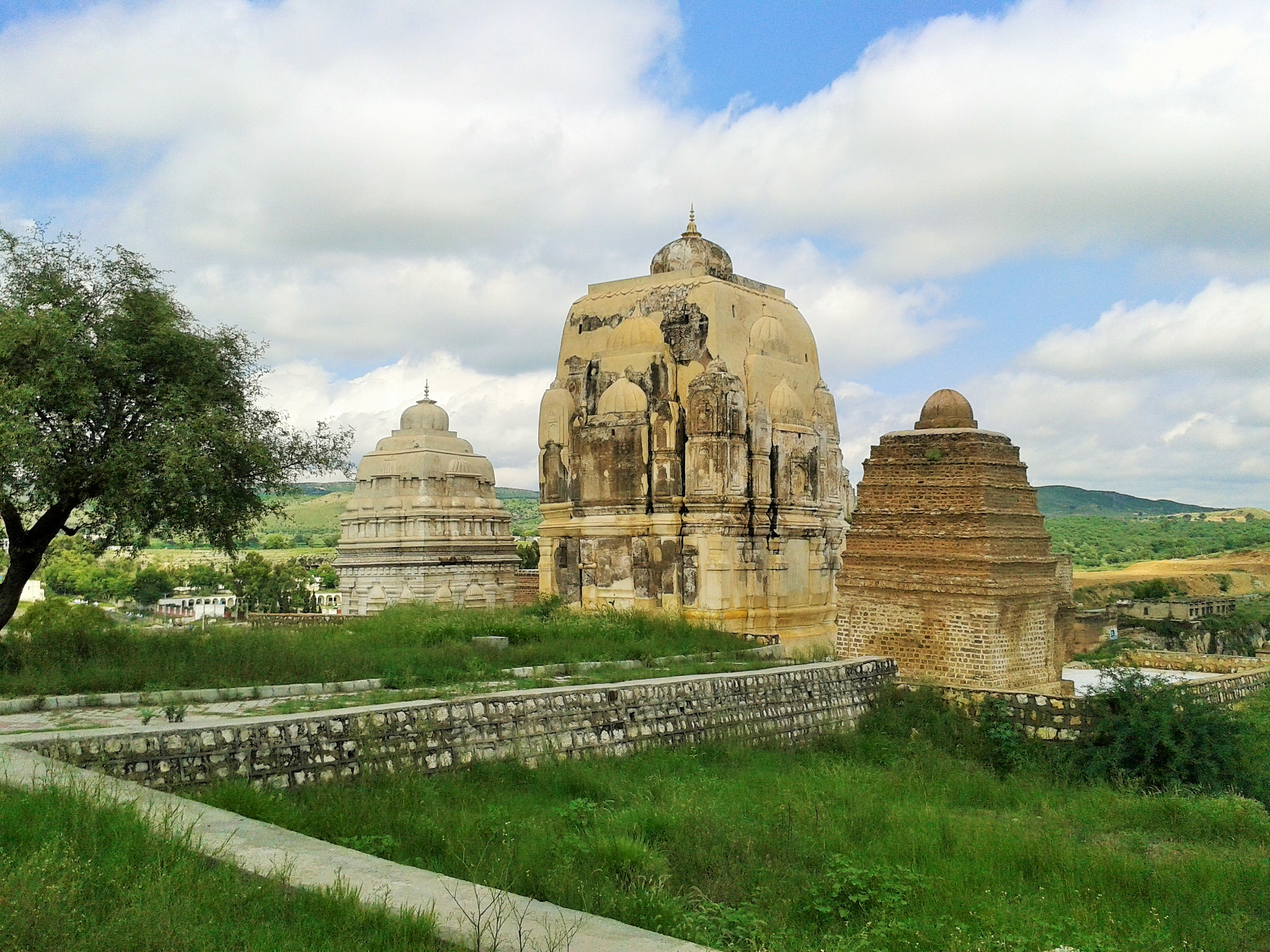
Satghara temples, 'Temple A' (10th century CE) is in centre while 'Temple B' (late 6th century CE) at right.

Satghara are a group of seven temples (out of which five are extant) located at some distance to the Katās pond and constitute the oldest group of structures. The oldest temple, termed 'Temple B' by archaeologist Michael W. Meister in his monograph on Odi Shahi temples, is dated to late 6th century CE. The main temple in Satghara complex, termed 'Temple A', was built in the 10th century CE by the Odi Shahi dynasty in Gandhara Nagara style.

The seven temples were built in an architectural style similar to Kashmiri temples, with dentils, fluted pillars, trefoil arches, and rooflines that are pointed.

=== Ramachandra Temple ===
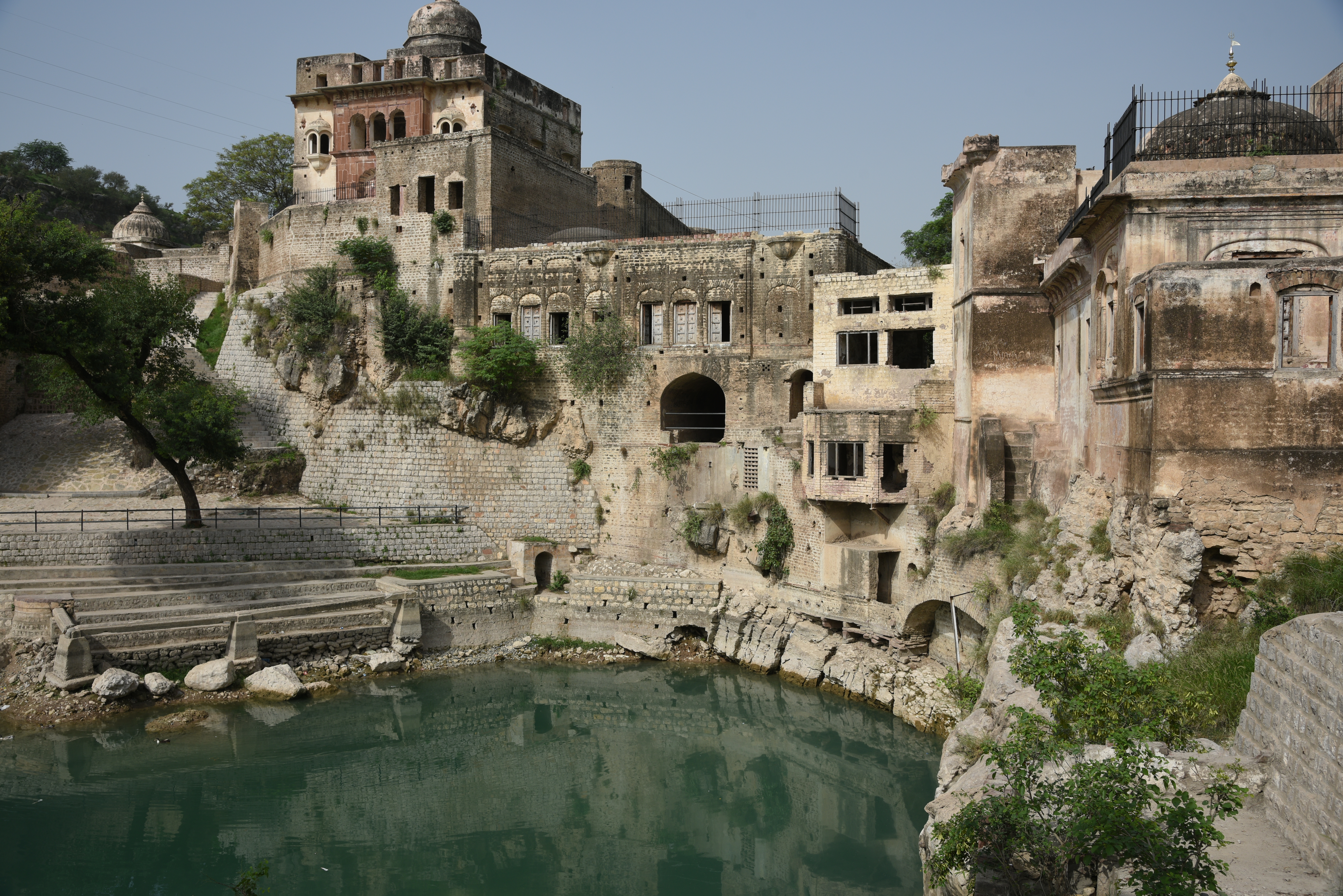
The prominent Ramchandra Temple to the upper left

The Rama Mandir is situated to the east of the Hari Singh Haveli and is closed from all sides except for an entrance on the east. The double-storied structure has eight rooms of various dimensions on the ground floor and a staircase at the south leading to the first floor. The mandir has two jharokas (balconies) that have been severely damaged.

=== Hanuman Temple ===
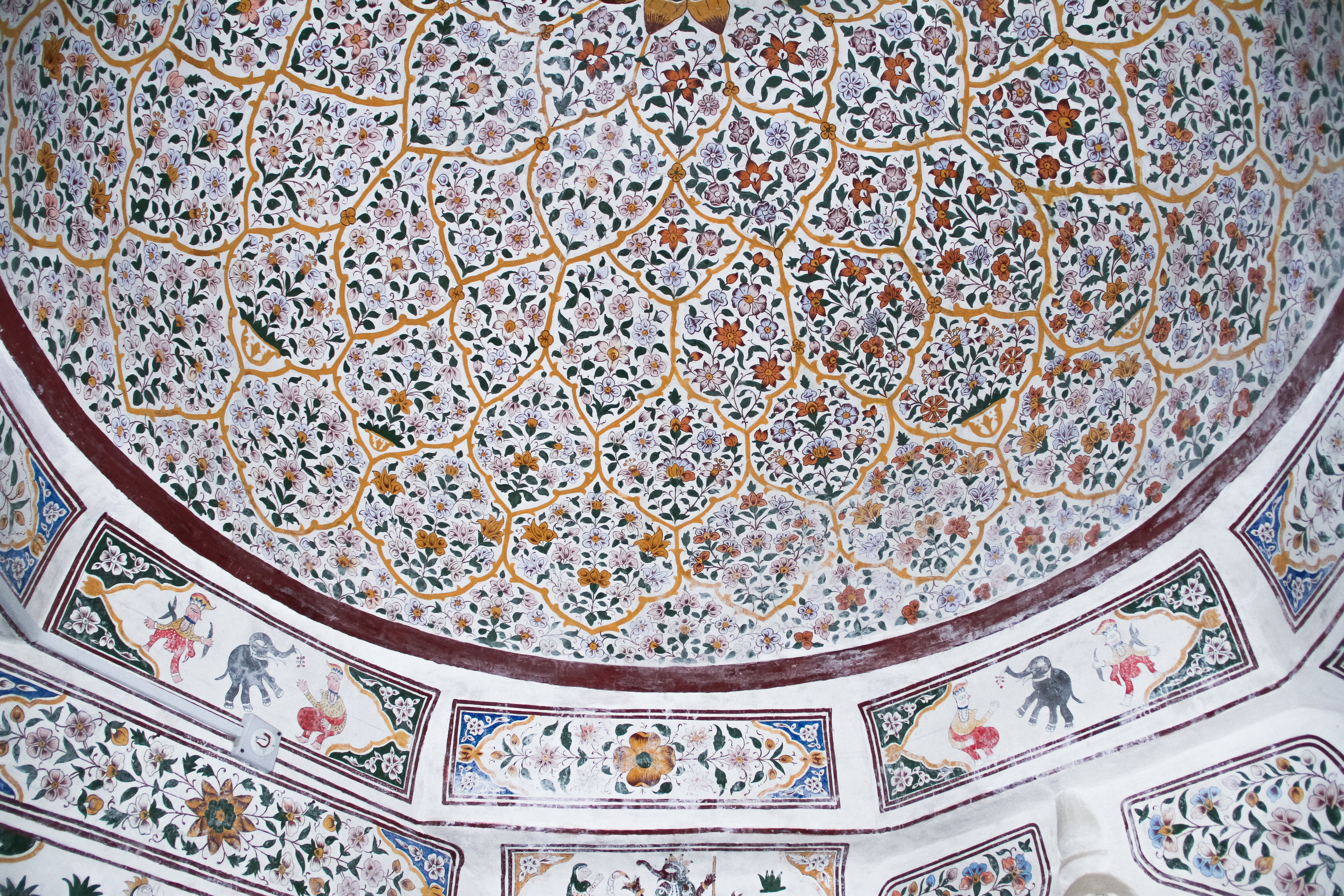
Decorative artwork adorns the ceiling of the Ramachandra Temple.

The Hanuman Mandir is on the western extreme of a high rectangular enclosure with entrances on the south and the north. The temple's ceiling is decorated, and lime-plastered.

=== Shiva Temple ===
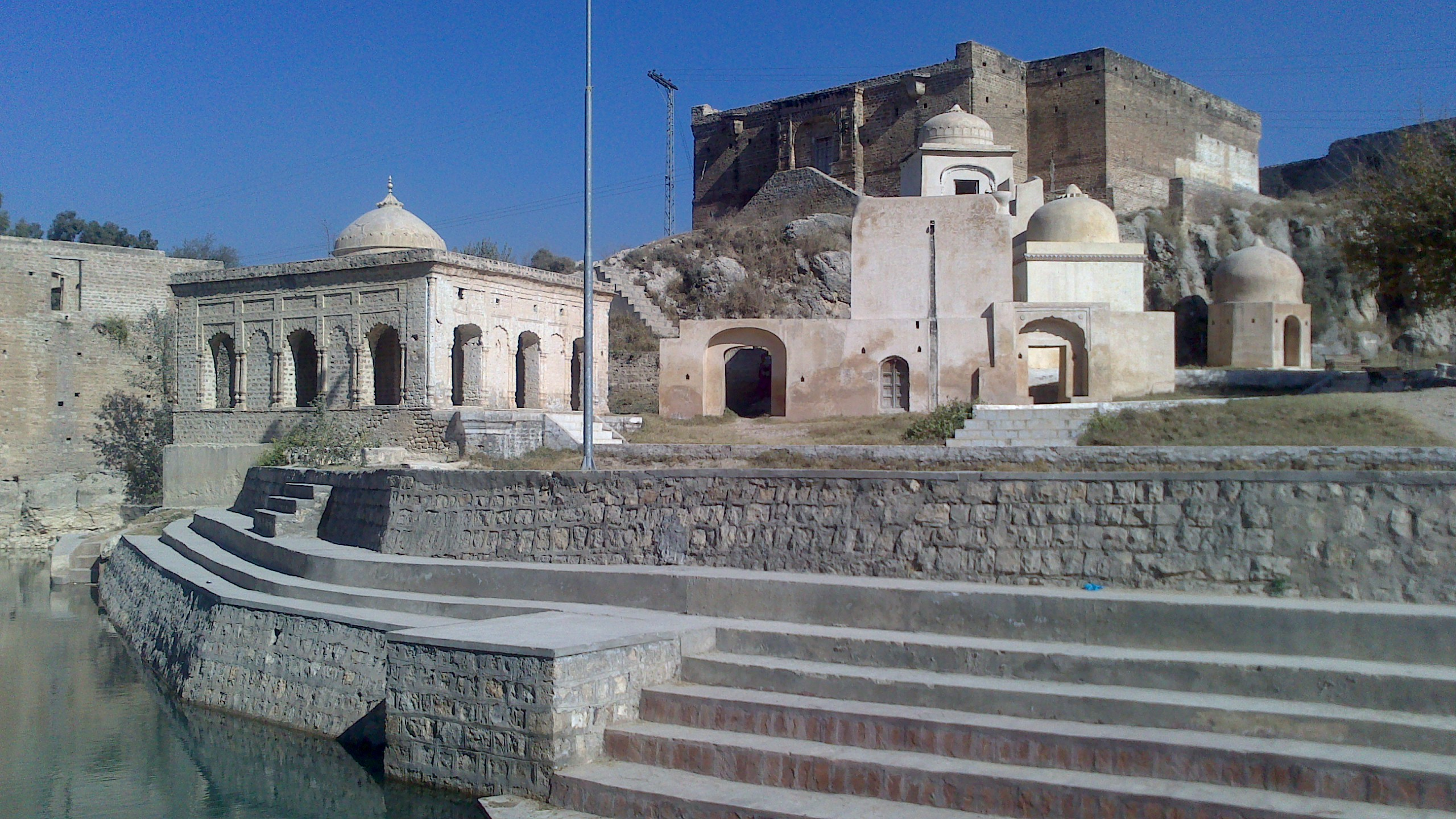
The Shiva Temple to the right

The Shiva temple is also built on a square platform. Its entrance is a recessed round arch with faint cusps and a rectangular opening to the north.

=== Hari Singh Nalwa Fort and Haveli ===
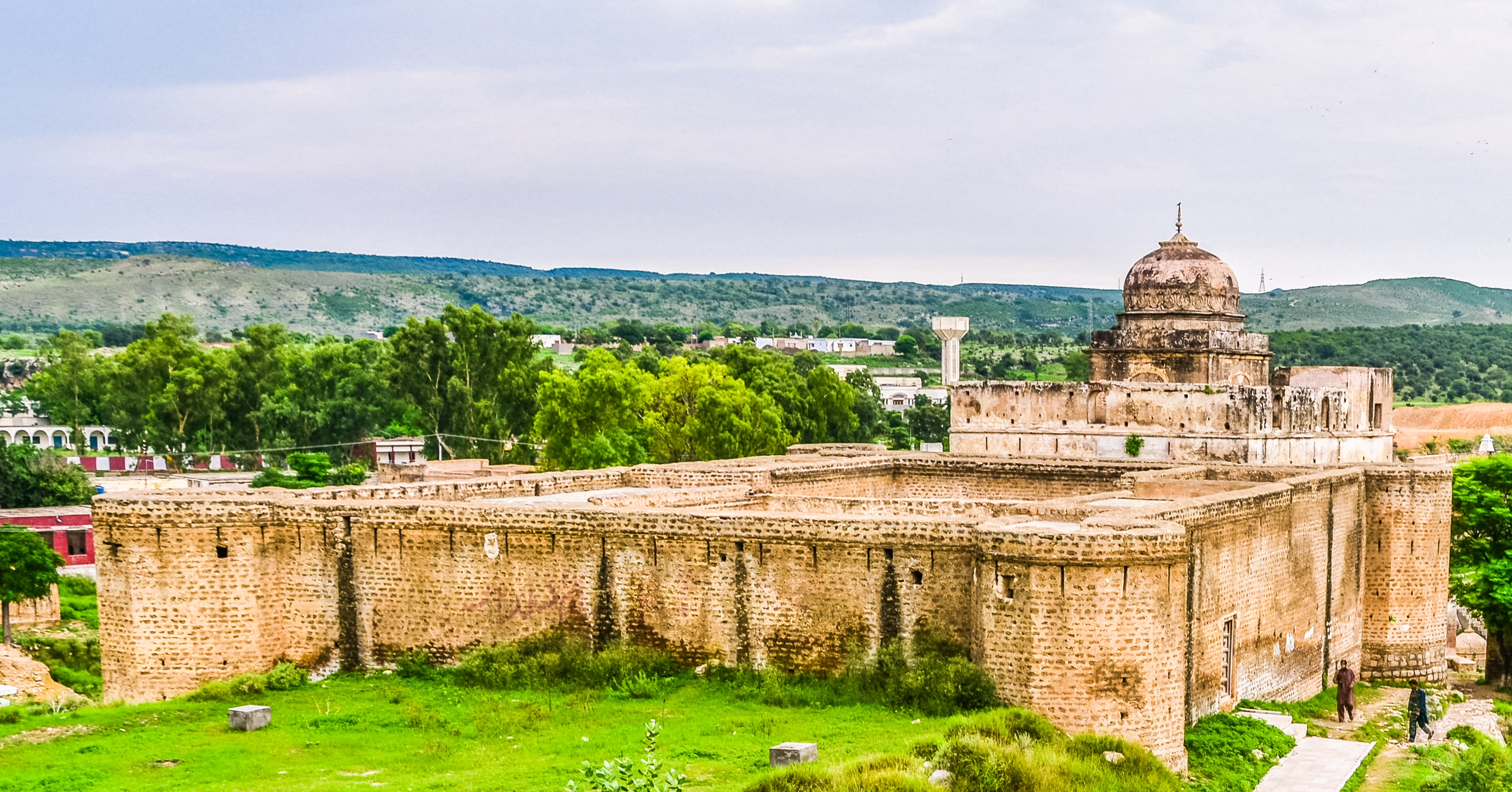
Hari Singh Nalwa's Fort and haveli.

A small fort cum residence was built during the reign of Hari Singh Nalwa, and was built for his use as a fort and residence. The fort itself is located on a small hillock and overlooks the entire temple complex.

The fort is rectangular and features four bastions, one in each corner of the fort. The walls are approximately 5 metres tall, and features an entryway in the western wall of the fort. The central portion of the fort features a small courtyard, around which an arched veranda is found. The interior rooms were not decorated.

== Conservation ==
For decades the temple complex was in bad state. The holy pond was littered with garbage, while the murals inside the temples disappeared due to the ravages of time and the neglect of the authorities. The temples were visited by India's former deputy prime minister Lal Krishna Advani in 2005, and In 2006, the Pakistani government began restoration works at the temples, with further improvements announced in 2017.

Murtis (idols) of Hindu gods were placed in the seven temples, at a cost of Rs. 51.06 million. A three-member archaeological team visited India, Sri Lanka and Nepal to collect murtis of various Hindu gods.

Drama serial Kanpur Se Katas Tak was also shot here in 2010 starring Saba Qamar and aired on Indus Vision.

As of 2012, the temple pond was drying up as ground water had been diverted for industrial purposes, though the local cement factory was temporarily shut down to restore water levels.

In January 2017, Pakistani authorities began the installation of shikharas on the temples, and installed a water filtration system to provide potable water for pilgrims. By May 2017, water levels in the sacred pond were again noted to be falling.

In 2016, the temples hit the national news after its centuries-old water pond ran dry, attributed to the depletion of groundwater owing to the establishment of four major cement factories in the area. After the situation was reported, the Supreme Court of Pakistan took a suo motu notice and started hearing the case in November. In 2017, while hearing the case, Nisar stressed, "This temple is not just a place of cultural significance for the Hindu community, but also a part of our national heritage. We have to protect it." The bench of judges during the hearing of the case also expressed displeasure at the absence or displacing of idols from the temples. In May 2018, the top court announced its verdict on the case by ruling that the cement factories would have to source water from elsewhere, and in the meantime, pay the Government of Punjab, Pakistan for the water they draw. It told Bestway and DG Khan cement factories to fulfill their water needs from any other alluvial source such as river Jhelum.

In July 2025, the temple was damaged by floods.

== See also ==
- Hinduism in Pakistan
- Hinduism in Punjab, Pakistan
- Nagarparkar Temples
