= Dalwal =

Dalwal ڈلوال
- Dalwal Kahoon
- Location in Pakistan
- Coordinates: 32°42′0″N 72°53′0″E
- Country: Pakistan
- Province: Punjab
- District: Chakwal District
- Time zone: UTC+5 (PST)
  - Summer (DST): +6

Dalwal (Urdu: ڈلوال) is a village and union council of Chakwal District in the Punjab Province of Pakistan. It is a part of the Choa Saidan Shah Tehsil and is located at 32°42'0N 72°52'60E. It is an old village, linked with Raja Daulat Khan.
