= Jaswal, Chakwal =

Jaswal
- Location within Pakistan
- Coordinates: 32.81°N 72.96°E
- Country: Pakistan
- Province: Punjab
- District: Chakwal
- Tehsil: Chakwal
- Elevation: 511 m (1,677 ft)

Population
  - Estimate: 3,000
- Time zone: UTC+5 (PST)

Jaswal is a village and union council of Chakwal District in the Punjab Province of Pakistan.
