= Choa Saidan Shah Tehsil =

Choa Saidan Shah Tehsil تحصِيل چوآسيدن شاه
- Tehsil
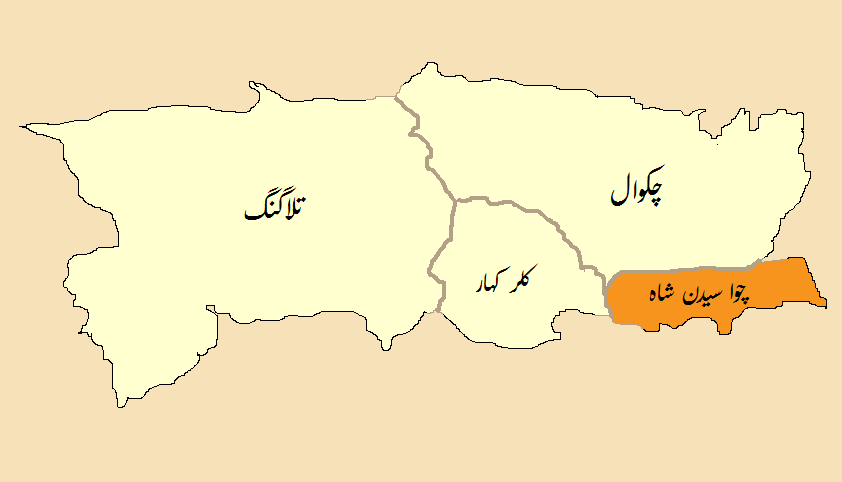
- Country: Pakistan
- Region: Punjab
- District: Chakwal District
- Capital: Choa Saidanshah
- Towns: 1
- Union councils: 8

Population
  - Tehsil: 167,537
  - Urban: 41,074
  - Rural: 126,463
- Time zone: UTC+5 (PST)
  - Summer (DST): UTC+5 (PDT)

Choa Saidan Shah Tehsil (Urdu: تحصِيل چوآسيدن شاه), is an administrative subdivision (tehsil) of Chakwal District in the Punjab province of Pakistan. The tehsil is subdivided into 8 Union Councils, one of which forms the tehsil's administrative capital Choa Saidanshah.

== Union Councils ==
Union Councils in the tehsil include Arra, Basharat, Choa Saidan Shah, Dalwal, Dandot, Dulmial, Lehr Sultanpur and Saloi.

Name Of Union Council and its Population (1998)
Union Council	Population
Choa Saiden Shah (Rural)	421
Dandot	16,025
Dalwal	15,981
Dulmial	17,040
Lahr Sultan Pur	19,202
Basharat	14,283
Ara	8,886
Saloi	2,800
