= Choa Saidanshah =

Choa Saidan Shah
- Town
- Interactive map of Choa Saidan Shah
- Coordinates: 32°43′00″N 72°59′00″E
- Country: Pakistan
- Province: Punjab
- District: Chakwal District

Government
  - Type: Municipal Committee
- Elevation: 676 m (2,218 ft)

Population
  - Total: 40,000

Choa Saidan Shah (Punjabi, Urdu: چوآ سيدن شاه) is a town and tehsil of Chakwal District in the Punjab Province of Pakistan. It is the administrative capital and one of the seven union councils of Choa Saidan Shah Tehsil.

== Geography ==
Choa Saidan Shah is located in the south of Chakwal about 35 kilometres (22 mi) from the town centre on the Chakwal-Khewra road, east of Kallar Kahar, about 27 kilometres (17 mi) from the M2 motorway, about 10 kilometres (6 mi) north of Khewra and about 6 kilometres (4 mi) from Katas. The town is placed in a bowl shaped valley, surrounded by hills. It is surrounded by trees and orchards, and is famous for its roses and perfumes.

== History ==
This town is named after the saint Saidan Shah Shirazi. The legend goes that the area was a desert until the holy man arrived, when he struck the ground with his staff and sweet water sprang up ("Choa" چوآ Punjabi means "spring"). The saint's shrine is set back from the main bazaar in a courtyard, and the annual urs is held in April.
