= Naseer Ahmed Khandowa =

Pakistani politician

Dr Naseer Ahmed Khandowa نصیر احمد کھنڈوعہ

Personal details
- Born: Pind Dadan Khan, Pakistan

Naseer Ahmed Khandowa (Urdu:نصیر احمد کھنڈوعہ) is a Pakistani politician who is a member of the Provincial Assembly of Punjab.

== Personal life ==
He was born on March 11, 1974 in Pind Dadan Khan Pakistan. He is Doctor by profession, and worked as a political leader.

== Political career ==
Khandowa was elected to the Provincial Assembly of Punjab from the constituency Chairman UC in the 2018 Pakistani by-elections on the ticket of Pakistan Tehreek-e-Insaf.
