= List of villages in Chakwal District =

This is a list of villages in Chakwal District, Punjab, Pakistan.

A ا آ

- Uthwal اٹھوال
- Arra آڑا
- Amirpur Mangon امیرپورمینگن
- Arar Mughlan ارڑمغلاں
- Arar ارڑ

B ب

- Bheen بھین
- Behkri بہکڑی
- Bhagwal Town بھگوال
- Bhaun Town بھون
- Badshah Pur بادشاہ پور
- Basharat Town بشارت
- Balkassar Town بلکسر
- Balokassar بلوکسر
- Bidher بھدر '
- Bharpur بھرپور
- BHALLA بھُلہ
- Bhudial (Chakwal) بھدیال
- BANGWALA بنگوالہ
- Begaal بیگال
- Bhatti Gujr بھٹی گجر
- Bhubhar بھُبھڑ
- Bulay Bala بولےبالا
- Bhawal بھاول
- Bhikari Kallan بکھاری کلاں
- Bhikari Khurd بکھاری خورد
- Buchal Khurd بوچھال خورد
- Buchal Kalan Town بوچھال کلاں
- Bulah بھلہ
- Booly بولے
- Bhal Pari بھال پڑی
- Ban Ameer Khatoon بن امرخاتوں

C چ

- Chattal چتال
- Chakral چکرال
- Chawli چاولی
- Chakora Town چکوڑہ
- Chakrala چکرالہ
- Chhoie Malot چھوئی ملوٹ
- Chak Bhon چک بھون
- Chak Misri چک مصری
- Chak Narang چک نارنگ
- Chak Malook چک ملوک
- Chak Kharak چک کھڑک
- Chak Jarre چک جڑے
- Chak Umra چک عمرہ
- Chak Chakora چک چکوڑہ
- Chak Ghakar چک گکھڑ
- Chak Nurang چک نورنگ
- Chak Oranky چک اورنکی
- Chak Bazeed چک بازید
- Chak Baqar Shah چک باقر شاہ
- Choa Ganj Ali Shah چوآگنج علی شاہ
- Chumbi چھمبی
- Chabri چبڑی
- Chabar چھبر
- Chakor چکور
- Chohan چوہان

D د ڈ

- Dhudial ڈھڈیال
- Dhoda Town ڈھوڈہ
- Dulmial دوالمیال
- Dingi Zair ڈنگی زیر
- Dingi Bala ڈنگی بالا
- Dhok Faqira ڈھوک فقیرہ
- Dhok Chadar ڈھوک چدھڑ

S

- Dhok Malkan ڈھوک ملکاں
- Dhoke Maken. ڈھوک میکن
- Dhok Taliyan ڈھوک ٹالیاں
- Dhok Wazira ڈھوک وزیرا
- Dhok Muhammad Shah ڈھوک محمد شاہ
- Dhok Ham ڈھوک ہم
- Dhok Chaudarian ڈھوک چوہدریاں
- Dhok Khandoya ڈھوک کھنڈوعہ
- Dhok Naka ڈھوک نکہ
- Dhok Parwana ڈھوک پروانہ
- Dhok Qado ڈھوک قادو
- Dhok Syal ڈھوک سیال
- Dhok Hajian ڈھوک حاجیاں
- Dhok Bhal ڈھوک بھال
- Dhok Bair ڈھوک بھیر
- Dhoke Babral ڈھوک ببرال
- Dhok Jakhar ڈھوک جکھڑ
- Dhok Bhalڈھوک بھال
- Dhok Ajri ڈھوک اجڑی
- Dhoke Bhiraڈھوک بھیرہ
- Dhok Hasolian ڈھوک ہسولیاں
- Dhok Karak Kabbah ڈھوک کڑک کھبہ
- Dhok Jakhar ڈھوک جکھڑ
- Dhoke Wadhanڈھوک ودہان
- Dhok Murid ڈھوک مرید
- Dhuman ڈہمن
- Dhalal دلال
- Darot دروٹ
- Dhab Pari ڈھاب پڑی
- Dhab Loharan ڈھاب لوہاراں
- Dhab Kalan ڈھاب کلاں
- Dhab Khushal ڈھاب خوشال
- Dhermond دھرمونڈ
- Dullah (Basti Abdullah) Town دلہہ
- Deewaliyan Town دیوالیاں
- Dab, Pakistan ڈ ب
- Dalel Pur دلیل پور
- Dhariyalaڈھریالہ
- Dhuli ڈھلی
- Dhaku ڈھکو
- Dheedwal دیدوال
- Dhapai ڈپئی
- Dandoot ڈنڈوٹ
- Dalwal ڈلوال
- Dhaularدلار
- Dhruggi Rajgan دھروگی راجگان
- Dheri Saidan ڈھیری سیداں
- Domeli ڈومیلی
- Doray ڈورے
- Dora ڈورا
- Dhari ڈھیری
- Damal دمال
- Dhariyala Kahon ڈھریالہ کہون
- Dhok Feroz ڈھوک فیروز

F ف

- Fim Kasar فم کسر
- Fareed Kasar فرید کسر

G گ غ

- Gahi گاہی
- Gah گاہ
- Ghazial غازیال
- Ghaugh
- Gufanwala گفانوالہ
- Ghool گھول
- Ghanwal گھنوال

H ح ہ

- Hastal ہستال
- Hasola ہسولہ
- Hasil حاصل
- Hajyal حجیال
- Haapi ہاپھی
- Haraaj ہراج
- Har Do Saba ہر دو سبا
- Hattar حطار

J چ

- Jabairpur جبیر پور
- Jamalwal جمالوال
- Jasila جسیلہ
- Jabbi جبی
- Jandala Raika جنڈالہ رائیکا
- Jandial Faizulah جندیال فیض اللہ
- Jandial Mehmood جندیال محمود
- Jand Awan جند اعوان
- Jand Khanzada Town جنڈ خانزادہ
- Jaswal جسوال
- Jhatla Jaswal جھاٹلہ جسوال
- Jutana جتیانہ
- Jund جند
- Jewal جیول
- Jhek جھیک
- Jorr جوڑ
- Jethal جيٹهل
- Janga جنگاہ
- Jhalay جھالے
- Joya Mair جویا میر

K خ ک

- Khanpur, Chakwal Town خانپور
- Khewal کھیوال
- Khuian کھوئیاں
- Kurpal کرپال
- Khokhar Zer کھوکھر زیر
- Kot Iqbal کوٹ اقبال
- Kot Rajgan کوٹ راجگان
- Kot Raja کوٹ راجہ
- Khandowa کھنڈوعہ
- Kalu jo کالو جو
- Kaal کال
- Kahan Pur کہان پور
- Khengar کھینگر
- Karim Abad کریم آباد
- Khairpur, Chakwal Town خیر پور
- Karuli کرولی
- Katas کٹاس
- Khajaula کھجولہ
- Khokhar Bala کھوکھر بالا
- Kariyala کریالہ
- Karsal کرسال
- Khai کھائی
- Kaijli کھیجلی
- Kotlay کوٹلے
- Kot Abdal کوٹ ابدال
- Koth Chaudarian کوٹ چوہدریاں
- Kaliyal کلیال
- Kahot کہوٹ
- Khanwal کھنوال
- Khara کھارا
- Khoday کھودے
- Kalas کالس
- Koliyan کولیاں
- Karhan کرہان
- Kotehra کٹیہڑہ
- Kalan Wali کالاں والی

L ل

- Liliyandi للیانڑی
- Lakhwal لکھوال
- Lari Shah Nawaz لہڑی شاہ نواز
- Lilla للہ
- Lafi لاپھی
- Latifal لطیفال
- Langa لنگا
- Lehr Sultanpur لہڑ سلطان پور
- Lohesar لوہیسر

M م

- Mangan مینگن
- Mulhal Mughlan Town ملہال مغلاں
- Minwal منوال
- Muhra Thaneel موہڑہ تھنیل
- Muhra Korchasham موہڑا کورچشم
- Muhra Sheikhan موہڑہ شیخاں
- Muhra Lasu موہڑہ لاسو
- Muhra Awan موہڑہ اعوان
- Muslim Abad مسلم آباد
- Murid (Chakwal) مرید
- Matan Kalan متن کلاں
- Munday منڈے
- Makhial مکھیال
- Miani Town میانی
- Munara منارہ
- Mahinwal مہینوال
- Mian Mair میاں میر
- Manakpur مانک پور
- Mangwal منگوال
- Maghal مگہال
- Mona مونا
- Maswal مسوال
- Mohra Qazi موہڑہ قاضی
- Mohra Malkan موہڑہ ملکان
- Muhra Lasu موہڑہ لاسو
- Muhra Gujran موہڑہ گجران
- Mohra Shareef موہڑہ شریف
- Mohra Allo موہڑہ الہو
- Makhdom Jahanian مخدوم جہانیاں
- Mari ماڑی
- Moolwal مولوال
- Meerwal میروال
- Moolay مولے
- Murhal مڑہال
- Mehro مہرو
- Marath مارتھ
- Mustafa Abad مصطفےآباد

N ن

- Noopur (Chakwal) نور پور
- Neela, Chakwal نیلہ
- Nachindi نچندی
- Noorpur (Kallar Kahar) نورپور کلر کہار
- Nadral ندرال
- Nain Sukh نین سکھ
- Narwal نروال
- Noorwal نوروال
- Nadral نادرال
- Narang Saidan نارنگ سیداں
- Naza Muglah نازہ مغلاں

O ا

- Odherwal Town اوڈھروال

P پ

- Parhal پڑہال
- Phatoki پھتوکی
- Pir Phulai Town پیر پھلائی
- Pindi Gujran Town پنڈی گجراں
- Panjain پنجائن
- Patalian پتالیاں
- Pidh Town پڈھ
- Phadial پڈھیال
- Punjdhera پنج ڈہرہ
- Padshan پادشاہاں
- Patwali پتوالی
- Pinwal پنوال
- Peelo پیلو
- Pipli پپلی

R ر

- Ratuchha رتوچھہ
- Rawal Bala راول بالا
- Ranja رانجا
- Ransial رنسیال
- Rehn Sadatرہن سادات
- Rehra ریہڑا
- Roopwal روپوال
- Rabal ربال
- Narang Sydan نارنگ سیداں

S س ص

- Sangwala سانگلہ
- Sahgalabad Town سہگل آباد
- Saidpur سیدپور
- Shahpur Saidan شاہپور سیداں
- Sadwal سدوال
- Shahpur Bilokassar شاہپوربلوکسر
- Shah Said Bullo شاہ سید بلھو
- Sangwala سنگوالہ
- Satwak ست وک
- Sar سر
- Sarkalan سرکلاں
- Sawar سواک
- Saba Rajgan صابہ راجگان
- Soheiسوہی
- Simbal سمبل
- Sarkal Mair سرکال مائر
- Sarkal Kassar سرکال کسر
- Saral سرال
- Salaoi سلوئی
- Sehti سیتھی
- Saka سکہ
- Sosian سوسیاں
- Sidhar سدھر
- Sikriala سکریالہ
- Siraal سرال
- Sutwal ستوال
- Suhair سوہیر
- Sang Kalan سنگ کلاں
- Sohaw سوہاوہ

T ت ٹ

- Takia Shah Murad تکیہ شاہ مراد
- Thanil Kamal تھنیل کمال
- Thaneel Fatohi تھنیل فتوحی
- Thirpal تھرپال
- Tuti Bann ٹوٹی بن
- Tatral (Chakwal) تترال
- Tatral (Choa Saidan Shah) تترال
- Thoa Bahadur Shah Town تھوہا بہادر شاہ
- Thoha Hamayoun [Village]
- Tarimni ترمنڑی
- Thathi ٹھٹھی
- Tharmal Dhewal تھرمال دھیوال

U ا

- Uthwal اٹھوال

V و

- Vasnal وسنال
- Vero ویرو

W و

- Warwaal وروال
- Wahali Zair وہالی زیر
- Wariamal وریمال
- Wahdry واہدرے
- Waola وعولہ

Warray واڑے
