= Bhun railway station =

Railway station in Pakistan

Bhaun railway station بھون ریلوے اسٹیشن

General information
- Owner: Ministry of Railways
- Line: Mandra–Bhaun Railway

Other information
- Station code: BVX

Services
Preceding station	Pakistan Railways	Following station
Chakwal towards Mandra Junction	Mandra–Bhaun Railway (defunct)	Terminus

Bhaun railway station (Urdu: بھون ریلوے اسٹیشن is located in Punjab, Pakistan.

== See also ==
- List of railway stations in Pakistan
- Pakistan Railways

== Gallery ==
Buildings at Bhaun railway station
