= Sohawa–Chakwal Road =

Road in Pakistan

Sohawa Chakwal Road سوہاوہ چکوال سڑک

Route information
- Maintained by Punjab Highway Department
- Length: 70 km (43 mi)

Major junctions
- East end: Tehsil Chowk, Chakwal
- West end: Chakwal Chowk, Sohawa

Location
- Country: Pakistan
- Major cities: Khanpur, Mulhal Mughlan, Sehgalabad, Peer Phulai, Dhok Amb, Jand Khanzada

Highway system
- Roads in Pakistan

Sohawa–Chakwal Road (Punjabi, Urdu: سوہاوہ چکوال سڑک) is a provincially maintained highway in Punjab, Pakistan, that extends from Sohawa to Chakwal. The route is generally rural, passing through Chakwal, Jhelum and Rawalpindi districts of Punjab. The route is 70 kilometres (43 mi) long with a speed limit of 60 km/h (37 mph), except within towns, where the speed limit is reduced to 40 km/h (25 mph). The eastern terminus ends in Sohawa at the N-5 National Highway (Chakwal Chowk) while the western terminus ends at Tehsil Chowk in Chakwal with Talagang-Chakwal Road, Mandra Chakwal Road and Chakwal-Jhelum Road. Reconstruction of the road began on 6 September 2012 to convert the road to a dual carriageway. Construction was scheduled for completion in 2014, but has been on hold as of April 2015.
