= Sadwal =

Pakistani village

Sadwal, Chakwal سدوال
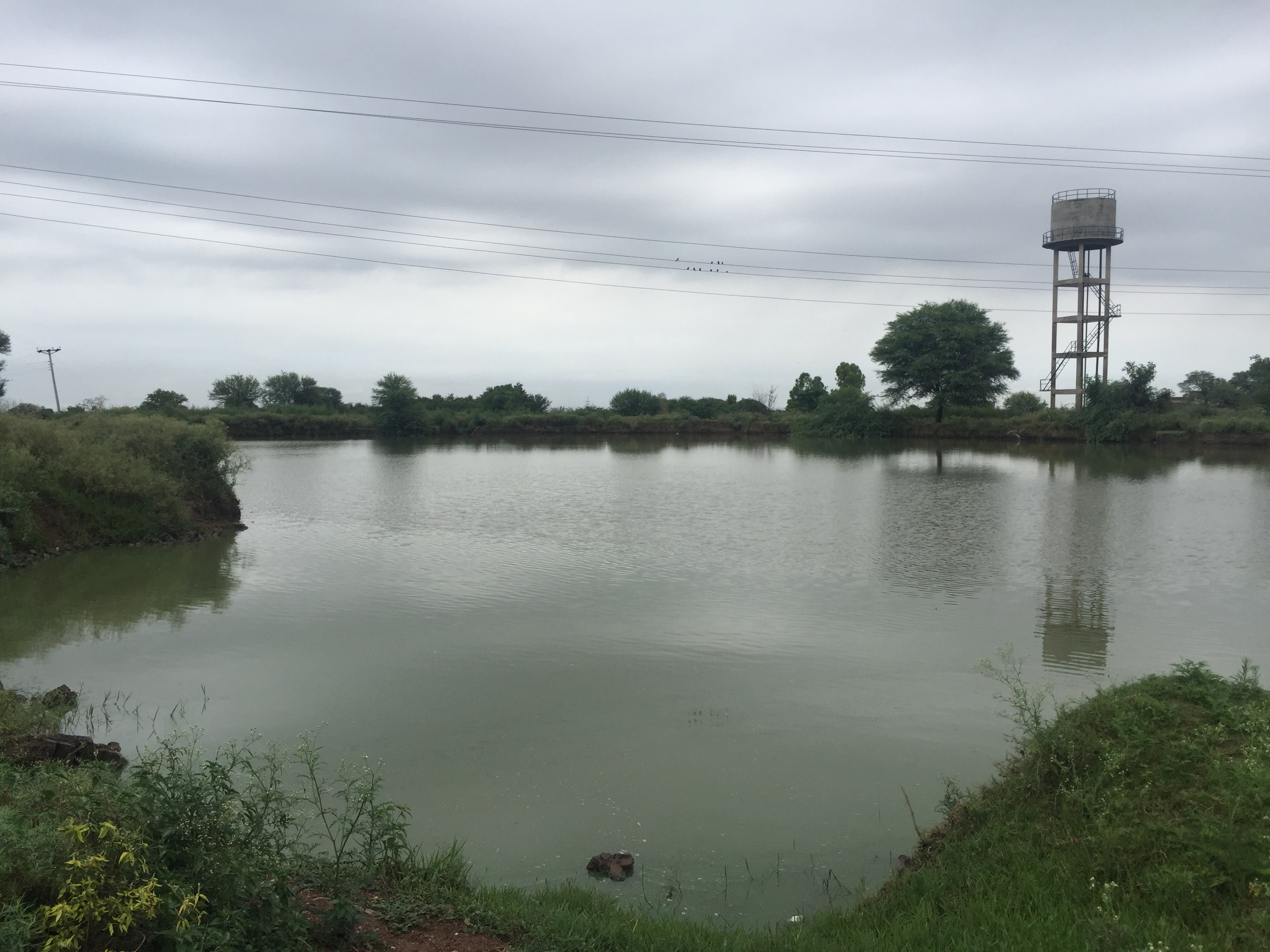
- Countryside around Sadwal
- Interactive map of Sadwal, Chakwal
- Coordinates: 32°53′0″N 72°50′0″E
- Country: Pakistan
- Province: Punjab
- Region/Division: Rawalpindi division
- District: Chakwal
- Tehsil: Tehsil Chakwal

Government Union council
  - Type: Odherwal
- Time zone: UTC+5 (PST)
- Postal Code: 48600
- Area code: 0543

Sadwal is a village located about 12 kilometres (7.5 mi) from Tehsil and District Headquarter Chakwal in Punjab, Pakistan, and approximately 3 km from the nearby town of Bhoun. It is one of the oldest villages of Chakwal Tehsil, with a population of around 18,000 people. The village is home to three prominent mosques: Paki Masjid, Ghousia Masjid, and Masjid Bilal.

Sadwal is located in the southern part of Chakwal. It is bordered by Janga and Mohra to the east and Bhoun Road to the west. Several residents have moved to big cities like Islamabad and Rawalpindi for better educational and work opportunities. The majority of the residents are involved in agriculture, while many work abroad, particularly in Gulf countries, Europe, and a significant number in Hong Kong. The residents of Sadwal primarily speak Punjabi and Urdu, while English is also spoken among fractions of the population.

== Educational institutions ==
- Government Higher Secondary School Sadwal (boys +Girls).
- Al-Rehman Public Secondary School Sadwal.
- Al-Noor Scholar Elementary School Sadwal.
