= Dhudial railway station =

Railway station in Pakistan

Dhudial Railway Station ڈھڈیال ریلوے اسٹیشن
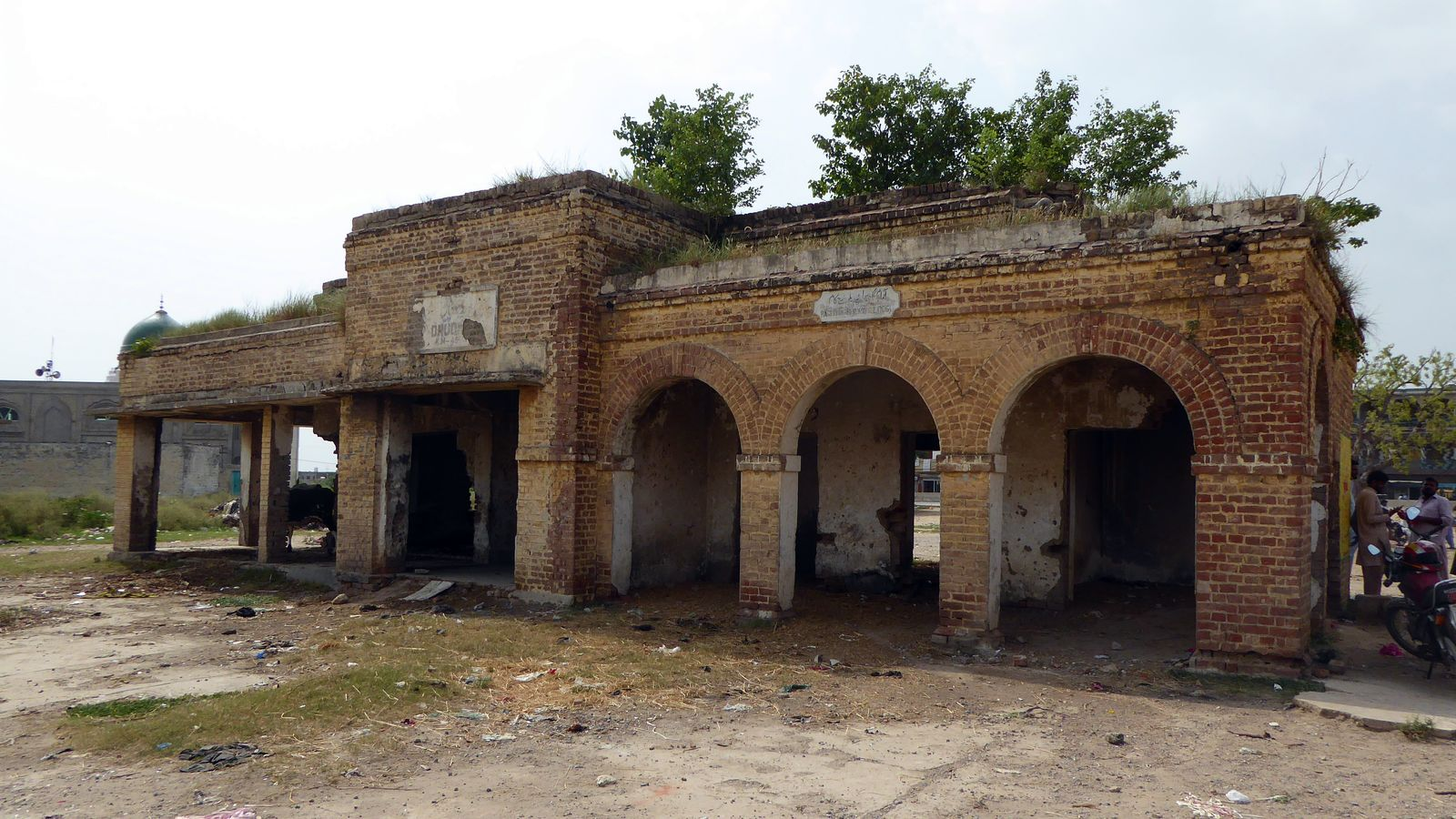

General information
- Owner: Ministry of Railways
- Line: Mandra–Bhaun Railway

Other information
- Station code: DIZ

Services
Preceding station	Pakistan Railways	Following station
Taragarh towards Mandra Junction	Mandra–Bhaun Railway (defunct)	Chakwal towards Bhaun
Location

Dhudial Railway Station (Urdu: ڈھڈیال ریلوے اسٹیشن) is located in Dhudial, District Chakwal, Punjab, Pakistan.

== See also ==
- List of railway stations in Pakistan
- Pakistan Railways
