= Mandra–Chakwal Road =

Road in Pakistan

Mandra–Chakwal Road مندرہ – چکوال سڑک

Route information
- Maintained by Punjab Highway Department
- Length: 63 km (39 mi)

Major junctions
- North end: at Mandra
- South end: Tehsil Chowk, Chakwal

Location
- Country: Pakistan
- Major cities: Dungi khurd, Jatli, Syed Kasran

Highway system
- Roads in Pakistan

Mandra–Chakwal Road (Punjabi, Urdu: مندرہ – چکوال سڑک) is a provincially maintained highway in Punjab, Pakistan, that connects Mandra and Chakwal. The route is generally rural, passing near several communities including Dhudial, Jatli and Syed Kasran. The route is 63 kilometres (39 mi) long with a speed limit of 100 km/h (62 mph), except within towns, where the speed limit is reduced to 40 km/h (25 mph). The northern terminus at Mandra merges with the N-5 National Highway while the southern terminus ends at Tehsil Chowk in Chakwal with Talagang-Chakwal Road, Sohawa Chakwal Road and Chakwal-Jhelum Road. On 6 September 2012, Prime Minister Raja Pervez Ashraf laid the foundation for the reconstruction of the Mandra-Chakwal Road. The contract was hastily awarded to the National Logistics Cell (NLC). The project is complete in 2019.

== See also ==
- Provincial Highways of Punjab
- Roads in Pakistan
