= Punjdhera =

- Village
- Punjdhera
- Interactive map of Punjdhera
- Country: Pakistan
- Province: (Punjab, Pakistan) Punjab
- District: Chakwal
- Postal code: 48800

Punjdhera (Urdu: پنج ڈیہرا) is a village and union council of Chakwal District of Punjab, Pakistan. It is near Mulhal Mughlan, which is located on Sohawa-Chakwal Road which leads to Talagang, Mianwali and is 26 kilometers from Chakwal city.

Chakwal was part of District Jhelum from 1947 till 1985, when Chakwal became a district with four tehsils. The district is administratively subdivided into four tehsils: Tehsil Chakwal Tehsil, Kallar Kahar Tehsil, Choa Saidan Shah Tehsil, and Talagang Tehsil. It is located 90 km south-east of the federal capital, Islamabad.

== Facilities ==
There is a Jamia Mosque in the centre of the village & Punjdhera welfare Committee In recent census population of punjdhera is 1502. A government primary school for boys and girls is also located here.

== Nearby ==
- Mulhal Mughlan
- Bhubhar
- Padshahan
