= Bhubhar =

Bhubhar – بھوبھڑ بھوبھڑ
- Village
- Bhubhar
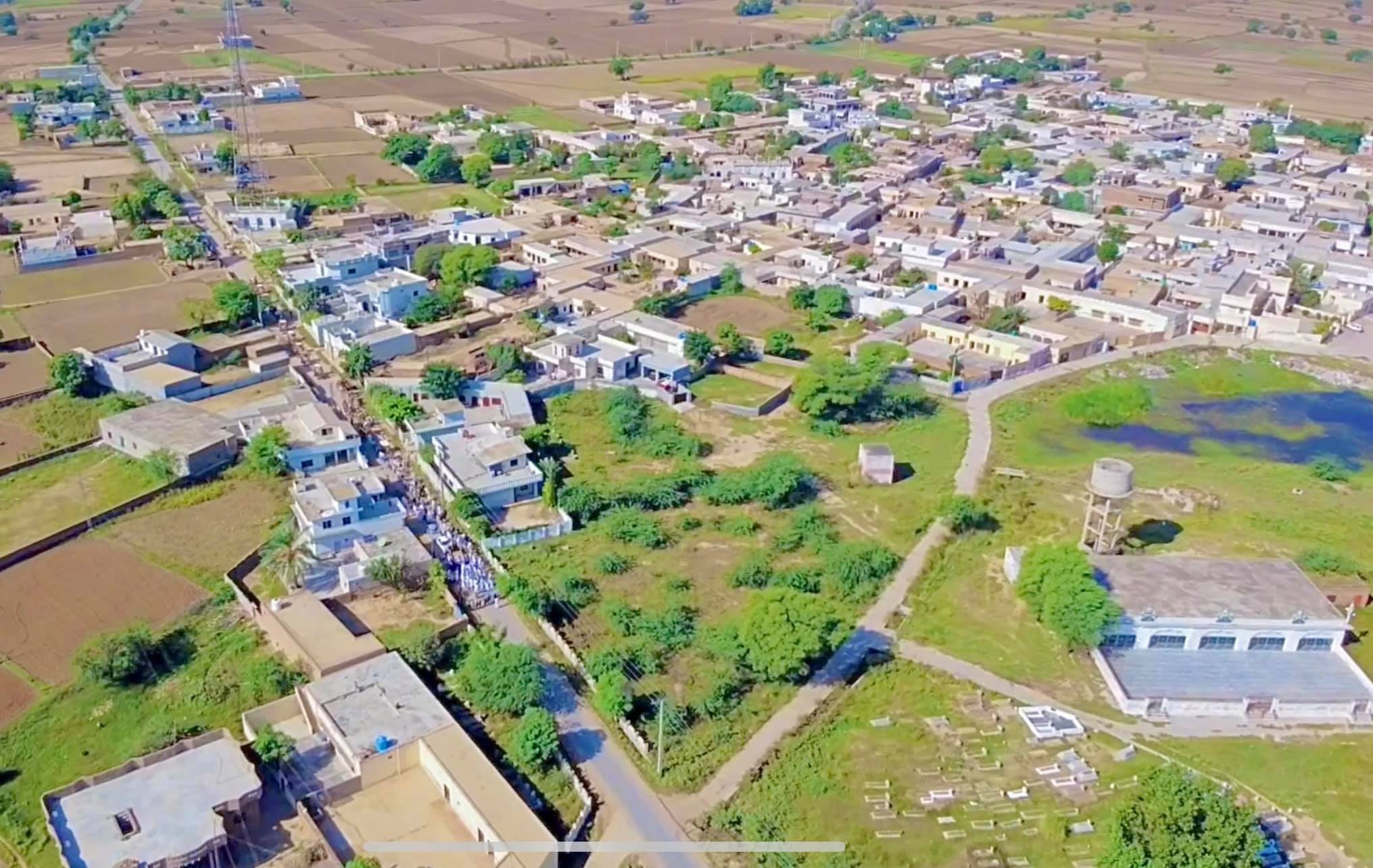
- Bhubhar Village
- Interactive map of Bhubhar – بھوبھڑ
- Coordinates: 33°00′20.5″N 73°06′55.9″E
- Country: Pakistan
- Province: (Punjab, Pakistan) Punjab
- District: Chakwal
- Time zone: UTC+5 (PKT)
- Postal code: 48800

Bhubhar (Urdu: بھوبھڑ) is a village located in District Chakwal, Punjab, Pakistan. Nearby villages are Mulhal Mughlan, Dharuggi Rajgan and Dhudial.

== Facilities ==
Bhubhar village has schools, markets, hospitals and a sports ground. Bhubhar village is home to Jutt Kalus, Awans and Kahouts local tribes who lives here from several centuries.

== See also ==
- Mulhal Mughlan
- Dharuggi Rajgan
- Dhudial
- Padshahan
