= Chawli =

- Location within Pakistan
- Coordinates: 33.01°N 72.34°E
- Country: Pakistan
- Province: Punjab
- Elevation: 403 m (1,322 ft)
- Time zone: UTC+5 (PST)
- Calling code: 0543

Chawli is a village in District Chakwal in Pakistan's Punjab province. It is located at 33°1'36N 72°34'1E at an altitude of 403 metres (1325 feet). Members of the Kassar tribe make up the bulk of the population. It is one of a cluster of villages such as Balkassar, Dhudial, Mangwal and Balokassar.
