= Mandra–Bhaun Branch Line =

Former railway line in Pakistan

Overview
- Native name: مندرہ–بھون
- Status: Dismantled
- Owner: Pakistan Railways
- Termini: Mandra Junction; Bhaun
- Stations: 13

Service
- Operator: Pakistan Railways

History
- Opened: 1915
- District's: Rawalpindi & Chakwal
- Closed: 1993

Technical
- Line length: 74 km (46 mi)
- Track gauge: 1,676 mm (5 ft 6 in)

Mandra–Bhaun Branch Line (Urdu: مندرہ–بھون برانچ لائن) was one of several railway lines in Pakistan, operated and maintained by Pakistan Railways. The line began at Mandra Junction and ended at Bhaun, a town about 12 kilometres (7.5 miles) south of the Chakwal city, at the foothills of Salt Range in Punjab. The total length of this railway line was 74 kilometres (46 miles) with 14 railway stations.

== History ==
A railway line between Bhaun and Mandra was originally proposed to transport freight and ore from the mineral-rich area of Chakwal, at the turn of the 20th century. In 1913, the North Western State Railway began constriction began of the line. The 44 kilometer Mandra–Dhudial section was opened on 1 May 1915, the Dhudial–Chakwal section was opened on 1 June 1915 and the Chakwal-Bhaun section was opened on 15 January 1916. In 1993, against the wishes of the locals, the railway line was abandoned and dismantled. It is alleged that the Nawaz Sharif government allowed the dismantling to occur, as some members of the ruling government had intricate ties to the private road transport businesses of the region. In 1997, the Supreme Court took notice of the dismantling and a categorical assurance was given by Pakistan Railways to revive the rail section. In 2007, Pakistan Railways finalized a plan to reconstruct the line and resume rail services. Sheikh Rasheed Ahmad, who was then Minister of Railways, promised to revive the railway line within one and half year at the cost of Rs. 2 billion (US$7.2 million). Again, Minister of Railways Khawaja Saad Rafique proposed to revive the still defunct railway line in 2017.

== Stations ==
- Mandra Junction
- Harnal
- Taragarh also called Sangh
- Sukho
- Muradi Janjil
- Daultala
- Sood Bidhana
- Sayyad Kasran
- Dhudial
- Chak Naurang
- Behkari Halt
- Chakwal
- Bhaun

== See also ==
- Karachi–Peshawar Railway Line
- Railway lines in Pakistan
- Pakistan Railways
