= Karsal =

Coordinates: 32°2′30″N 72°35′7″E

- Village and union council
- Interactive map of Karsal
- Country: Pakistan
- Region: Punjab Province
- District: Chakwal District
- Tehsil: Chakwal
- Time zone: UTC+5 (PST)

Karsal is a village and union council of Chakwal District in the Punjab Province of Pakistan. It is part of Chakwal Tehsil. Famous Sufi Bari Imam was born in this area. Members of the Kassar tribe make up the bulk of the population. It is one of a cluster of villages such as Chawli, Bhagwal, Dhoke Walana, Dhoke Kassar and Dhoke Chakoi which form the tribal homeland of the Kassar. The tribe is also linked to Karlal tribe which is found in Abottabad.
