= Saral, Chakwal =

Saral
- Village and union council
- Location in Pakistan
- Coordinates: 33°05′39″N 72°55′18″E
- Country: Pakistan
- Region: Punjab Province
- District: Chakwal District
- Time zone: UTC+5 (PST)

Saral is a village and union council of Chakwal District in the Punjab Province of Pakistan. It is part of Chakwal Tehsil.
