= Talagang–Chakwal Road =

Road in Pakistan

Talagang Chakwal Road تلا گنگ-چکوال سڑک

Route information
- Maintained by Punjab Highway Department
- Length: 45 km (28 mi)

Major junctions
- East end: Traffic Chowk, Talagang
- West end: Tehsil Chowk, Chakwal

Location
- Country: Pakistan
- Major cities: Balkassar

Highway system
- Roads in Pakistan

Talagang–Chakwal Road (Punjabi, Urdu: تلا گنگ–چکوال سڑک) is a provincially maintained highway in Punjab, Pakistan, that connects Talagang and Chakwal. The route is generally rural, passing near several communities including Balkassar. The route is 45 kilometres (28 mi) long with a speed limit of 60 km/h (37 mph), except within towns, where the speed limit is reduced to 40 km/h (25 mph). The eastern terminus at Talagang ends at Traffic Chowk with Talagang-Mianwali Road and Talagang–Fateh Jang Road while the western terminus at Chakwal ends at Tehsil Chowk with Mandra-Chakwal Road and Chakwal-Jhelum Road. The road's Mianwali-Balkassar section has been handed over to National Highway Authority and numbered N-130.

== See also ==
- Provincial Highways of Punjab
- Roads in Pakistan
