= Chakral =

Pakistani village

- Location in Pakistan
- Coordinates: 32°55′N 72°56′E
- Country: Pakistan
- Province: Punjab
- District: Chakwal
- Time zone: UTC+5 (PST)
- Postal code: postal 48840

Chakral (Urdu: چکرال) is a village of Chakwal District in the Punjab province of Pakistan. It is part of Chakwal Tehsil. The village is located approximately 10 kilometres from Chakwal city.

== Education ==
Both government and private institutes exist in village. There are a number of schools in Chakral village. Separate institutions for girls are boys are there and some institutions support co-education.

== Other Facilities ==
Allied bank is also situated in the village which is only bank available in nearby villages. A Basic Health Unit is also located in Chakral which is only government hospital in nearby areas, thus facilitating the population of all villages around.
