= Choa Ganj Ali Shah =

- Location in Pakistan
- Coordinates: 32°49′0″N 73°6′0″E
- Country: Pakistan
- Province: Punjab
- District: Chakwal District
- Time zone: UTC+5 (PST)
  - Summer (DST): +6

Choa Ganj Ali Shah (Urdu: چوآگنج علی شاہ) is a village and union council of Chakwal District in the Punjab Province of Pakistan. It is part of Chakwal Tehsil.
