= Taragarh railway station =

Railway station in Pakistan

Taragarh Railway Station تاراگڑھ ریلوے اسٹیشن
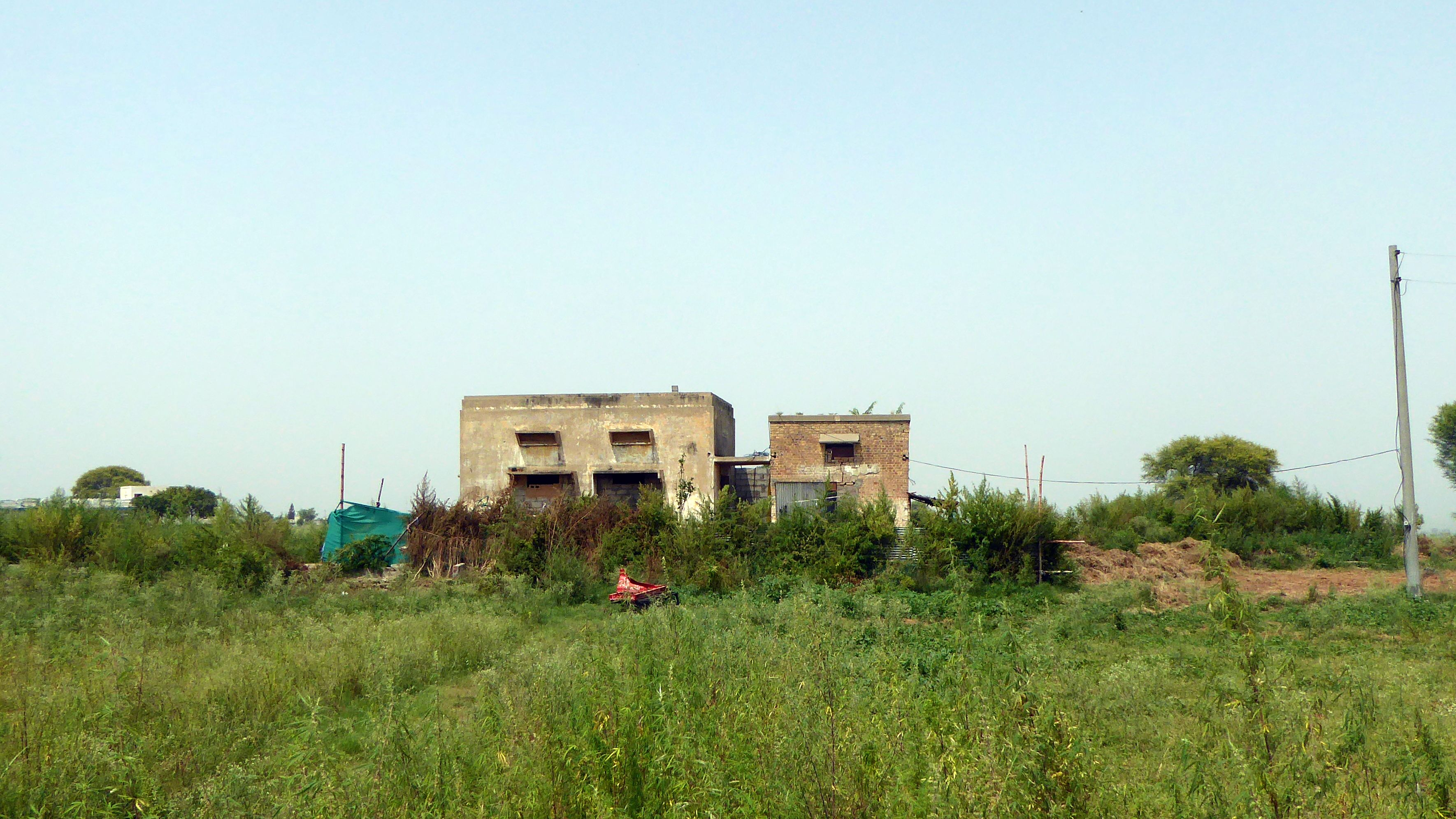

General information
- Owner: Ministry of Railways
- Line: Mandra–Bhaun Railway

Other information
- Station code: TRX

Services
Preceding station	Pakistan Railways	Following station
Mandra Junction Terminus	Mandra–Bhaun Railway (defunct)	Dhudial towards Bhaun
Location

Taragarh Railway Station (Urdu: تاراگڑھ ریلوے اسٹیشن) is an inactive railway station located in Chakwal District, Punjab, Pakistan.

== See also ==
- List of railway stations in Pakistan
- Pakistan Railways
