= Chak Bhoun =

Bhoun چک بھون
- Village and union council
- Country: Pakistan
- Province: Punjab
- District: Chakwal
- Tehsil: Chakwal
- Time zone: UTC+5 (PST)

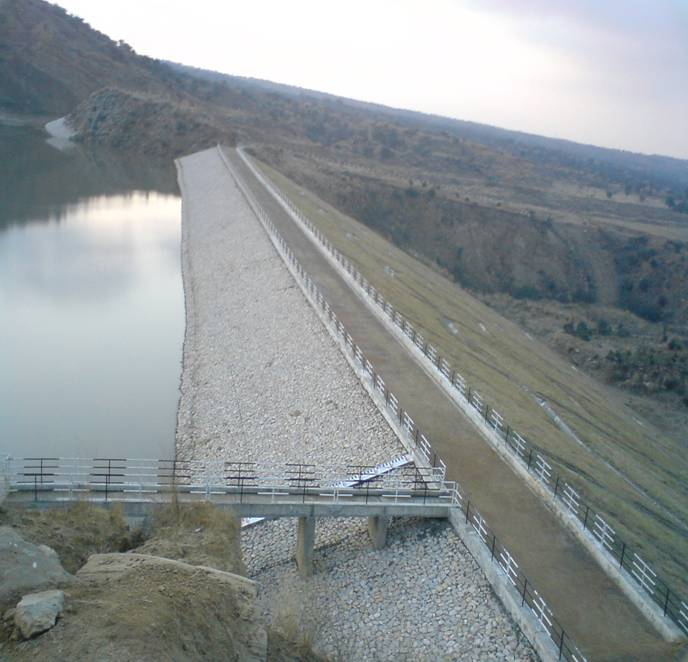
Khai Dam View near Chak Bhoun

Chak Bhoun (Punjabi, Urdu: چک بھون) is a village and union council of Chakwal District in the Punjab province of Pakistan.
