= Bari Imam =

17th-century Sufi ascetic from Punjab

Bari Imam بری امام
- Title: Mystic

Personal life
- Born: 1617 CE (1026 AH) Choli Karsal, Punjab, Mughal Empire (now in Punjab, Pakistan)
- Died: 1705 CE (1114 AH) Noorpur, Punjab, Mughal Empire (now in Islamabad, Pakistan)
- Main interest: Sufism

Religious life
- Religion: Islam
- Denomination: Sunni
- Jurisprudence: Hanbali
- Tariqa: Qadiri

Muslim leader
- Influenced by: Abdul Qadir Gilani

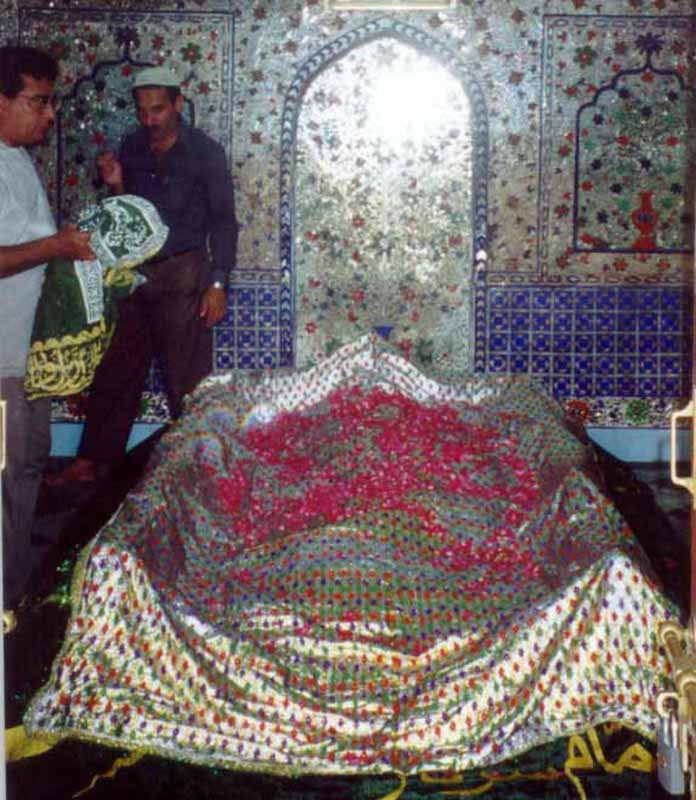
The tomb of Bari Imam in Islamabad

Peer Syed Abdul Latif Kazmi Mashadi Qadiri, often referred to as Bari Imam or Bari Sarkar (1617 – 1705), was a 17th-century Punjabi Muslim Sufi ascetic. He is venerated as the patron saint of Islamabad, Pakistan. Born in Karsal, Chakwal District, he is one of the most prominent Sufis of the Qadiriyya order of the Islamic mysticism Today, his shrine is widely visited by Sunni Muslims who venerate saints, especially those in Pakistan and South Asia.

The life of Bari Imam is known essentially through oral tradition and hagiographical booklets and celebrated in Qawwali songs of Indian and Pakistani Sufism.

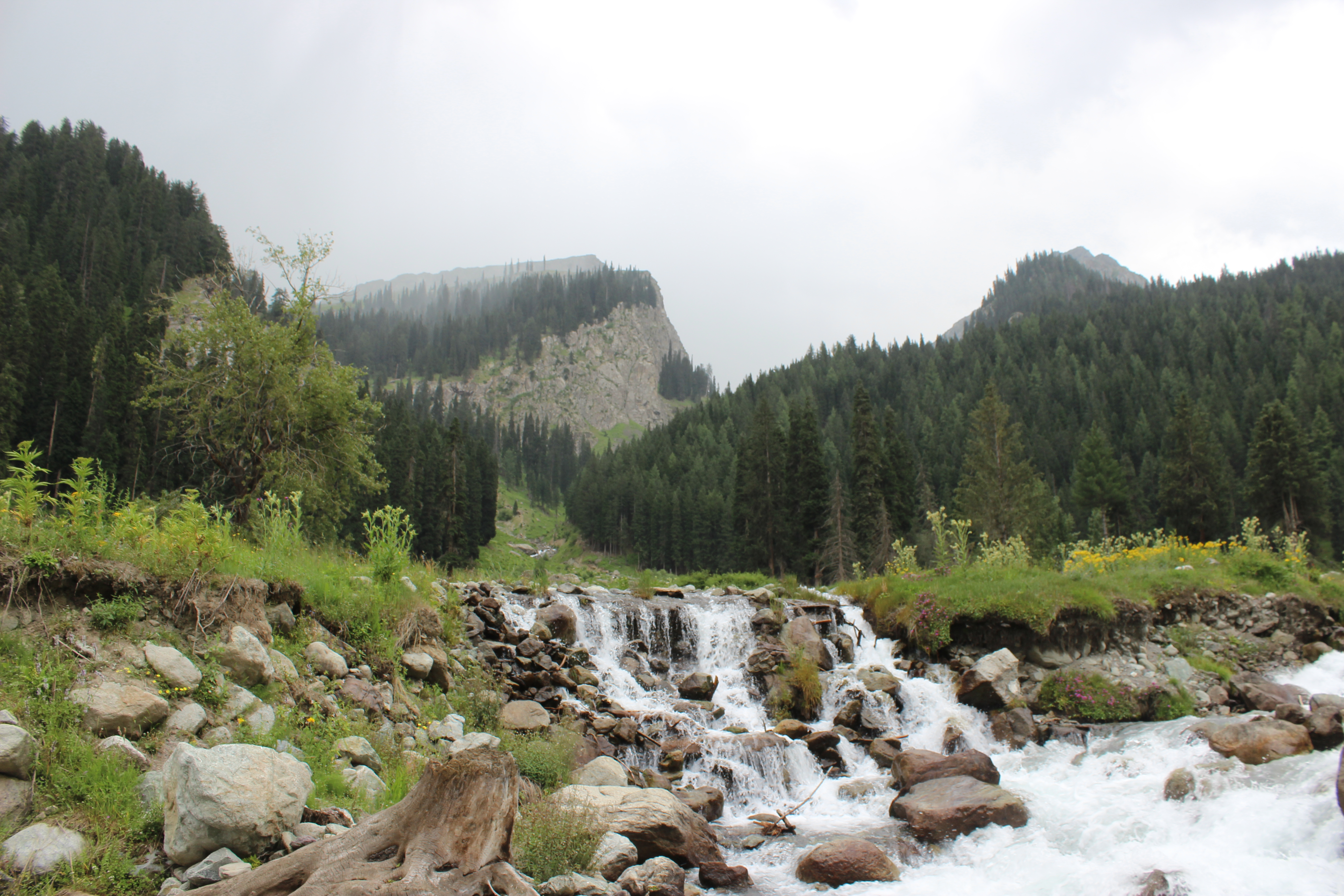
The forests where Bari Imam roamed

== Biography ==
Bari Imam was eight years old when his family migrated from Karsal in Chakwal District to what is now Aabpara, Islamabad in Pakistan. Additionally, Syed Kasran in the Tehsil of Gujjar Khan is considered to be his birthplace. His father, Syed Mehmood Shah, was a farmer whom he helped with farming and with his herd of animals until he was 12 years old. Then Bari Imam was sent to Ghorghushti in Campbellpur (now known as Attock, Punjab, Pakistan) where he stayed for two years to learn fiqh, hadith, logic, and other disciplines related to Islam, because at that time Ghorghushti was a renowned seat of Islamic learning.

According to some sources, he later married and had one daughter, though both his wife and daughter are said to have died prematurely. After their deaths, Bari Imam began wandering the forests of the Hazara district in Khyber Pakhtunkhwa, where he spent twenty-four years as an ascetic.

Shah Abdul Latif also went to Central Asian states of that period and to the Islamic holy cities of Mecca and Madinah to learn about Islam and perform hajj.

After his return to the Indian subcontinent, he then decided to settle in the Noorpur Shahan area (now Noorpur Shahan in Islamabad). At that time, this area was known to be a dangerous place (locally known as Chorpur (place of thieves) due to its reputation as full of bandits and killers who used to attack and rob trade caravans passing through this area headed towards Central Asian countries. Over time, he succeeded in teaching these people about love, peace and harmony. Later Shah Abdul Latif came to be known as "Bari Imam".

Because Bari Imam Sarkar did not transmit any of his doctrines to writing; as such, it may be rightly presumed that he bequeathed all of his teachings orally.

Bari Imam was renowned in his own life for being an ascetic who subjected himself to great self-humiliation in the public sphere, "living among the pariahs and consciously exposing himself to the disdain of the people."

A celebrated miracle worker, Bari Imam is also described in regional lore as one through whom God performed many marvels to convince the local people of the truth of Islam; thus, some of the most popular miracles ascribed to him are his having caused water to gush forth from rocks and his having brought back to life the dead water buffaloes of a peasant who had earlier provided the saint with milk during his ten years of spiritual seclusion.

== Shrine ==
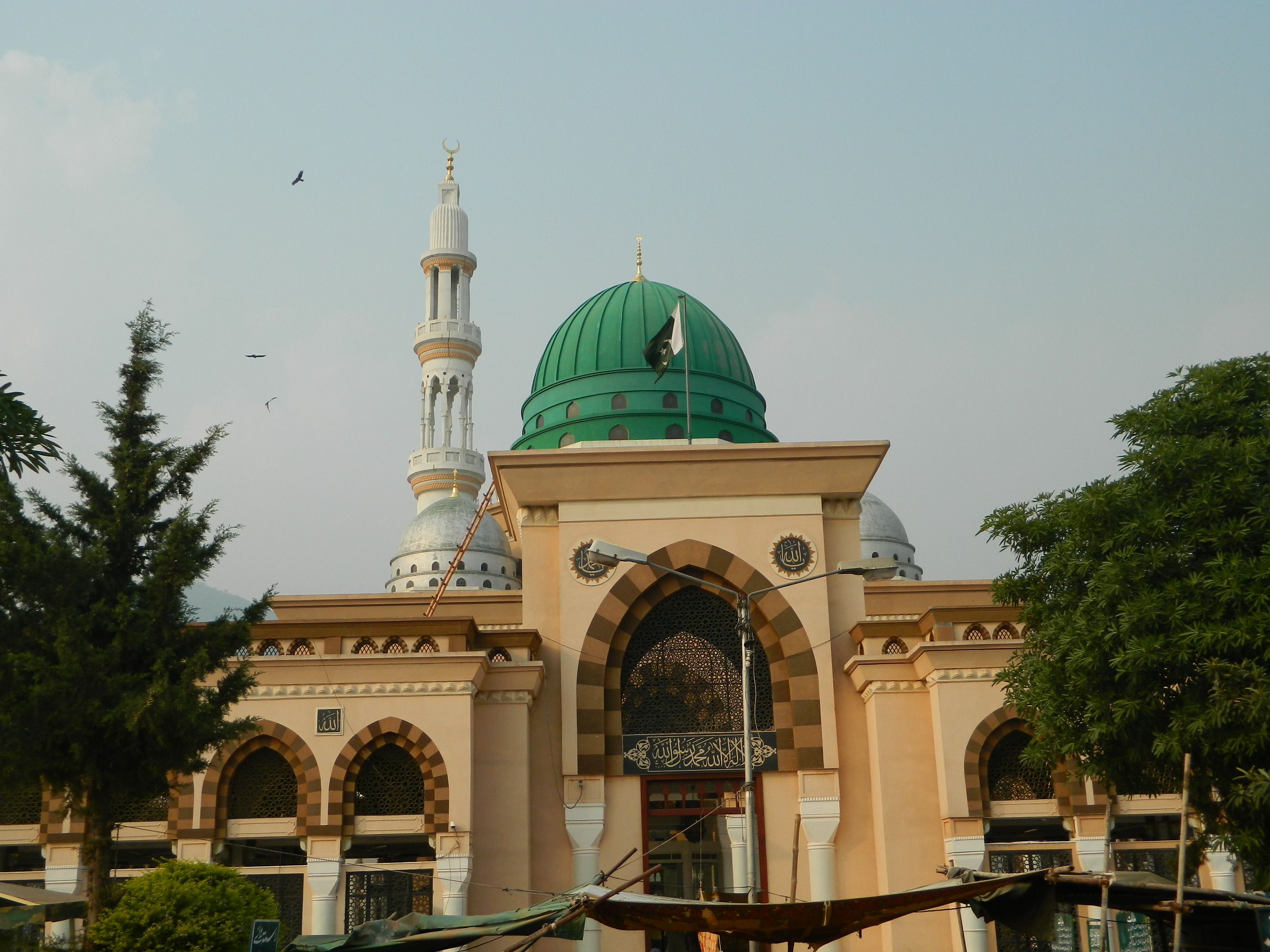
The shrine of Bari Imam in Islamabad

A silver-mirrored shrine of Bari Imam is located in Noorpur Shahan in Islamabad. It was originally built by the Mughal emperor Aurangzeb, who revered Bari Sarkar, in the 17th century. It has since been renovated many times, and is now maintained by the Government of Pakistan. Until the 1960s, the shrine was famous for its urs celebration, when the death anniversary of the saint was commemorated and which was attended by hundreds of thousands of people each year (in one particularly populous year, the attendance is said to have been 1.2 million people).

On 27 May 2005, a suicide attack took place at the shrine of Imam Bari in which 20 people died and almost 70 were injured.
