= Sukho railway station =

Railway station in Sukho, Pakistan

Coordinates: 33.27124°N 73.16092°E

Sukho Railway Station
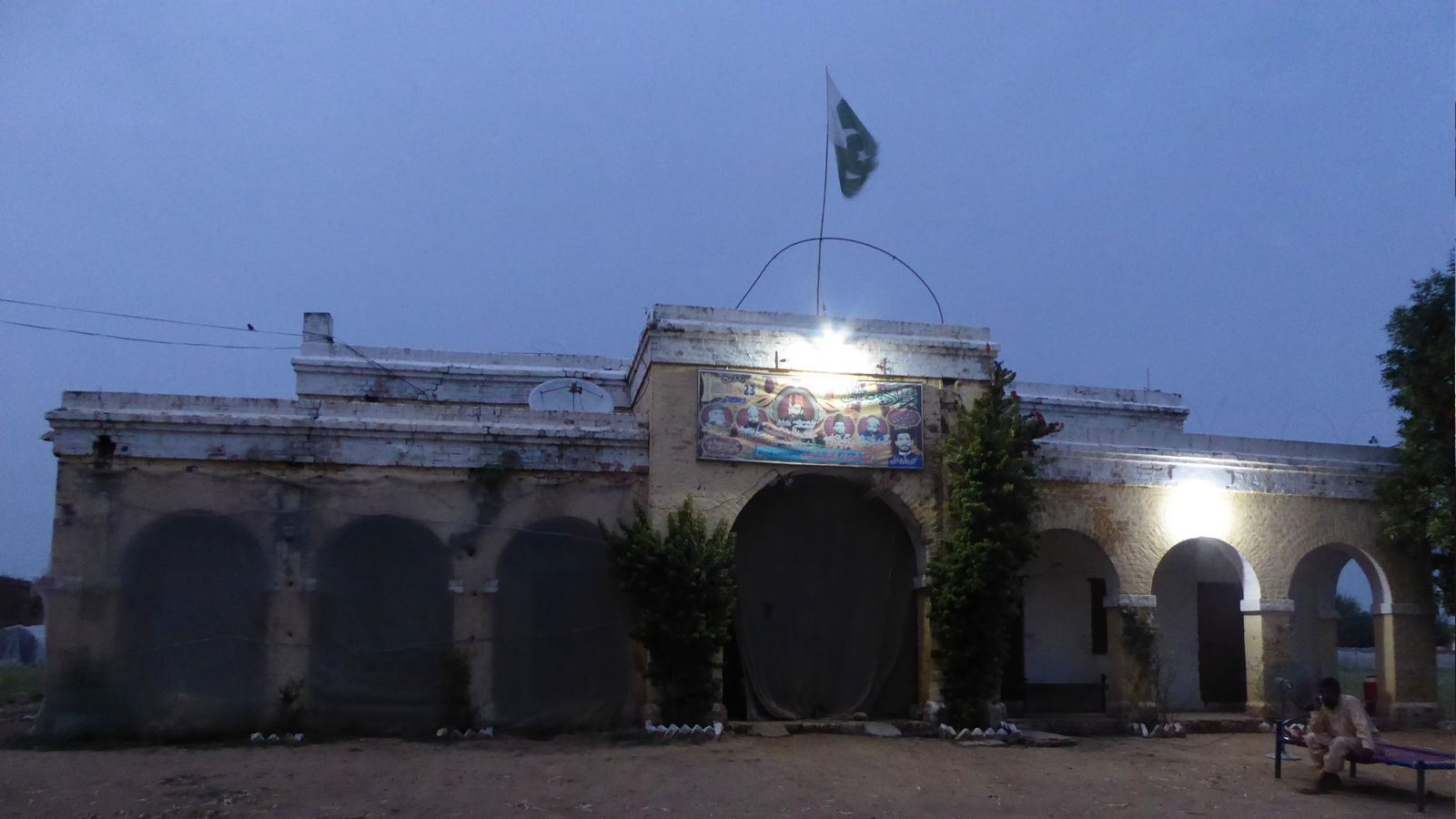

General information
- Owner: Ministry of Railways
- Line: Mandra–Bhaun Railway

Other information
- Station code: SQZ
Location

Sukho Railway Station (Urdu: سکھو ریلوے اسٹیشن) is inactive and defunct railway station located in Mandra-Bhaun Railway railway section in Tehsil Gujar Khan, District Rawalpindi Pakistan.

== See also ==
- List of railway stations in Pakistan
- Pakistan Railways
