= Ghazial =

Ghazial غازيال
- Town
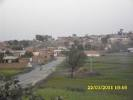
- Ghazial, Chakwal

- Location within Pakistan
- Coordinates: 32°57′26.29″N 73°10′1.18″E
- Country: Pakistan
- Province: Punjab
- District: Chakwal

Government
  - Chief Minister: Usman Buzdar

Area
  - Total: 2 km^{2} (0.77 sq mi)
- Elevation: 495 m (1,624 ft)

Population (2013)
  - Total: 9,000
- Time zone: UTC+5 (PST)
- Calling code: 543

Ghazial is a town of Mulhal Mughlan which is an administrative subdivision of Chakwal District in the Punjab Province of Pakistan. The population of Ghazial is about 9000 people in 2013.

== Location ==
Ghazial is located in the Lundi Patti plain, on the Jhelum-Chakwal boundary. Ghazial is located to the east of Chakwal City, southeast of Mulhal Mughlan and 5 km from Jhelum Road.

Around it there are many small villages including Dhoke Rehra, Ratta Mohra, Mehmood Mohra, Moohri, and Potha.

== Education ==
It is a town of well educated people that contributed in development of Chakwal and Pakistan.

Youth of Ghazial's prefer to join Armed Forces and are interested in Education services.

Ghazial has a high school for boys, and one Elementary School for girls. The youth of this village has made a welfare wing named as Ghazial Welfare youth wing.
