= Kot Choudrain =

Kot Chaudhrain (کوٹ چوہدریاں)
- Village and union council
- Interactive map of Kot Chaudhrain (کوٹ چوہدریاں)
- Country: Pakistan
- Region: Punjab Province
- District: Chakwal District
- Time zone: UTC+5 (PST)

Kot Chaudhrain is a village and union council of Chakwal District in Punjab of Pakistan. It is part of Chakwal Tehsil.
