= Shah Said Bullo =

Shah Syed Bulhoo شاہ سید بلہو
- Village
- Interactive map of Shah Syed Bulhoo
- Coordinates: 32°50′22.4″N 72°56′58.4″E
- Country: Pakistan
- Province: Punjab
- District: Chakwal
- Tehsil: Chakwal
- Union Council: Jaswal
- Post Office: Shah Syed Bulhoo

Government
  - Type: Union Council
- Time zone: UTC+5 (PKT)

Shah Syed Bulhoo (Urdu: شاہ سید بلہو) is a village located 17 kilometers from Chakwal city in Punjab, Pakistan.

The village was named after Bawa Shah Syed Bulhoo whose tomb is a famous site in this area. The people of Shah Syed Bulhoo belong to Shiite sect of Islam. Imam Bargah Qadeemi, a historical religious organization is situated in the village. Imam Bargah Qasr-e-Shabbir is also situated near Qadeemi Imam Bargah.

Imam Bargah Qadeemi is under the control of an organization called Anjuman Ghulaman-e-Imam Moosa Kazim which organizes the Majalis on important Shiite holidays.

Imam Bargah Qasr-e-Shabbir also organizes Majalis on special Shiite occasions.
