= Dumman =

- Village and union council
- Country: Pakistan
- Region: Punjab Province
- District: Chakwal District

Government
- Time zone: UTC+5 (PST)

Dumman or Dhuman is a village and a union council located on Jehlum Road in Chakwal District of the Punjab Province, Pakistan. It is part of Chakwal Tehsil. The village also houses a small hospital and a police station.

Primarily a Hindu majority area in pre-partition times, it still has an old Hindu temple on its hilltop. Also located in it is a rest house Bungalow from the Raj era. It also has a livestock hospital, post office and government schools for boys and girls.

The Famous Family of Dhuman is

Saif Awan Family (Numberdar Family)Which is also a landlord family of village.

Their Current head is

Malik Farrukh Naeem Awan

Current Numberdar.

A village named Arrar is located south of Dumman.
