= Muradi Janjil railway station =

Railway station in Pakistan

Muradi Janjil Railway Station

General information
- Owner: Ministry of Railways
- Line: Mandra–Bhaun Railway

Other information
- Station code: MRDJ

History
- Former names: Great Indian Peninsula Railway
Location

Muradi Janjil Railway Station (Urdu: مرادی جنجال ریلوے اسٹیشن) is inactive railway station located in Chakwal District, Punjab, Pakistan.

== See also ==
- List of railway stations in Pakistan
- Pakistan Railways
