= Thoha Hamayoun =

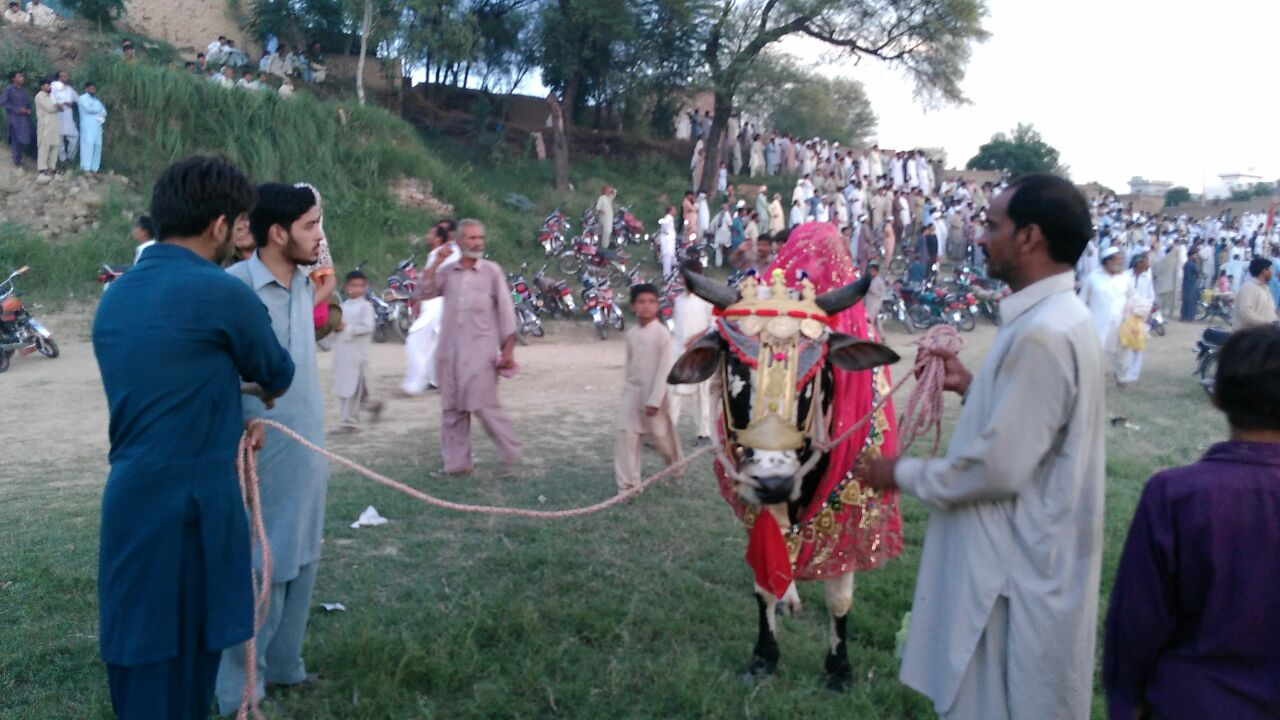
- Bull decorated for race

- Location in Pakistan
- Coordinates: 32°51′N 72°47′E
- Country: Pakistan
- Province: Punjab
- District: Chakwal District
- Time zone: UTC+5 (PST)
  - Summer (DST): +6
- Postal code: zip 48888

Thoha Hamayoun is a village of Chakwal District, Punjab, Pakistan, which is 15 km from the city of Chakwal, and close to the town of Bhaun.
