= Chak Naurang railway station =

Railway station in Pakistan

Chak Naurang Railway Station چک نورنگ ریلوے اسٹیشن

General information
- Owner: Ministry of Railways
- Line: Mandra–Bhaun Railway

Other information
- Station code: CKNG

Chak Naurang Railway Station (Urdu: چک نورنگ ریلوے اسٹیشن) is inactive railway station located in Chakwal District, Punjab, Pakistan.

== See also ==
- List of railway stations in Pakistan
- Pakistan Railways
