= Daultala railway station =

Railway station in Punjab, Pakistan

Daulatala Railway Station
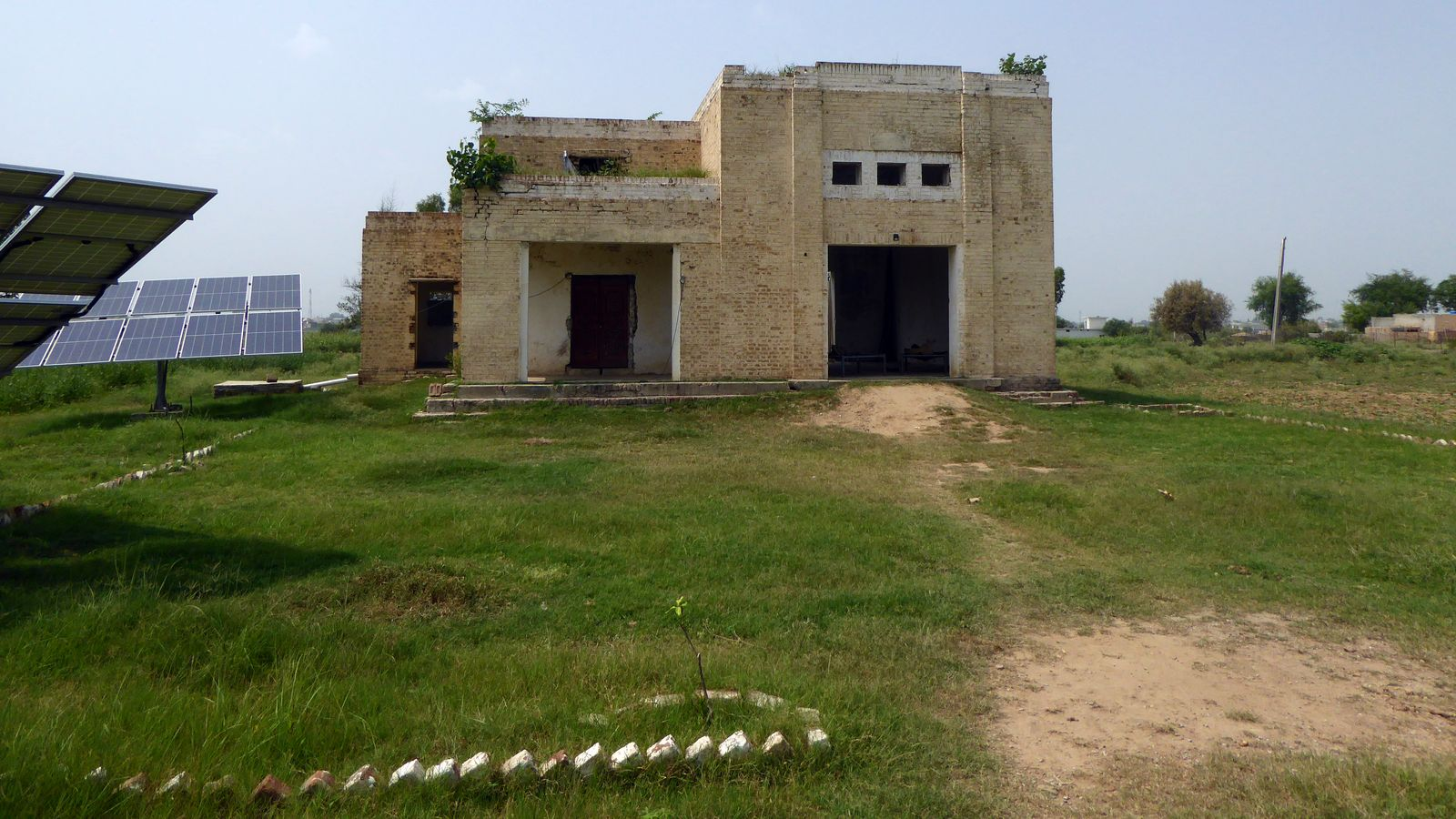

General information
- Owner: Ministry of Railways
- Line: Mandra–Bhaun Railway

Other information
- Station code: DTU

Daulatala Railway Station (Urdu: دولتالہ ریلوے اسٹیشن) is an abandoned station located in Chakwal District, Punjab, Pakistan.

== See also ==
- List of railway stations in Pakistan
- Pakistan Railways
