= Chakwal railway station =

Railway station in Pakistan

Coordinates: 32.937351°N 72.853207°E

Chakwal Railway Station چکوال ریلوے اسٹیشن
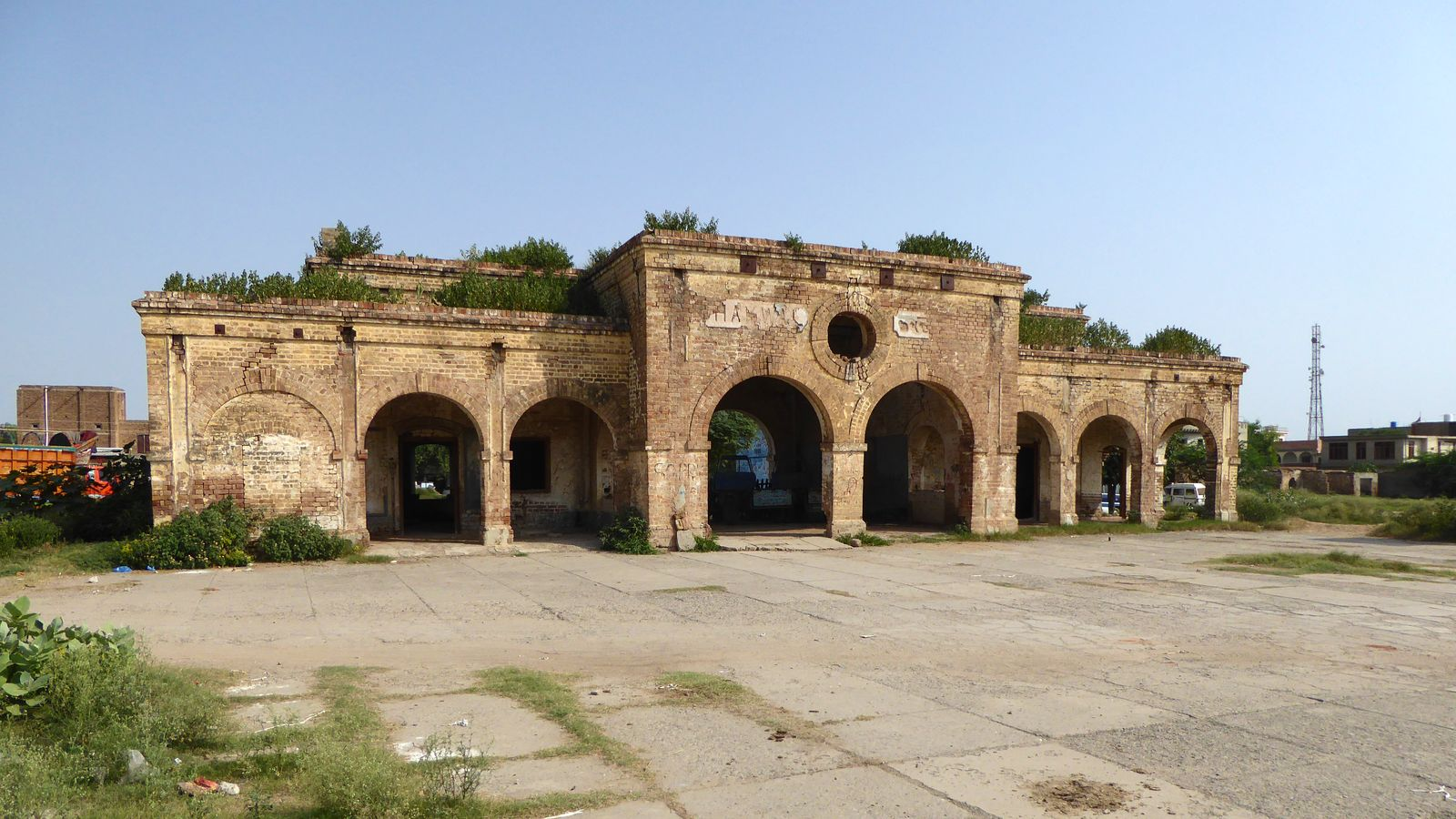

General information
- Owner: Ministry of Railways
- Line: Mandra–Bhaun Railway

Other information
- Station code: CWK

Services
Preceding station	Pakistan Railways	Following station
Dhudial towards Mandra Junction	Mandra–Bhaun Railway (defunct)	Bhaun Terminus
Location

Chakwal Railway Station (Urdu: چکوال ریلوے اسٹیشن) is an abandoned and dismantled railway station, located at Chakwal, Pakistan.

== See also ==
- List of railway stations in Pakistan
- Pakistan Railways
