= Bheen =

- Location in Pakistan
- Coordinates: 32°47′0″N 73°6′0″E
- Country: Pakistan
- Province: Punjab
- District: Chakwal District
- Time zone: UTC+5 (PST)
  - Summer (DST): +6

Bheen (Urdu: بھین) is a village and union council of Chakwal Tehsil, Chakwal District in the Punjab province of Pakistan.
