= Chak Malook =

Chak Maloook
- Location in Pakistan
- Coordinates: 32°58′N 72°57′E
- Country: Pakistan
- Province: Punjab
- District: Chakwal District
- Time zone: UTC+5 (PST)
  - Summer (DST): +6
- Postal code: zip 48888

Chak Malook (Urdu: چک ملوک) is a village and union council of Chakwal District in Punjab, Pakistan. It is part of Chakwal Tehsil, and is located at 32°58'0N 72°57'0E.
