= Thanil Kamal =

Coordinates: 33°09′N 72°44′E

Thanil Kamal is a village of Chakwal District, Punjab, Pakistan. The village is about 30 kilometres from Chakwal city. Nearby villages include Bhikhari, Chak kuka, Dabri, Dulla, Ghugh, Haraj, Jabbi Dhok, Narag, and Pind. Thanil Kamal and Dulha may be considered "twin villages". A seasonal river borders Thanil Kamal.
