= Karuli =

Coordinates: 32°41′N 72°47′E

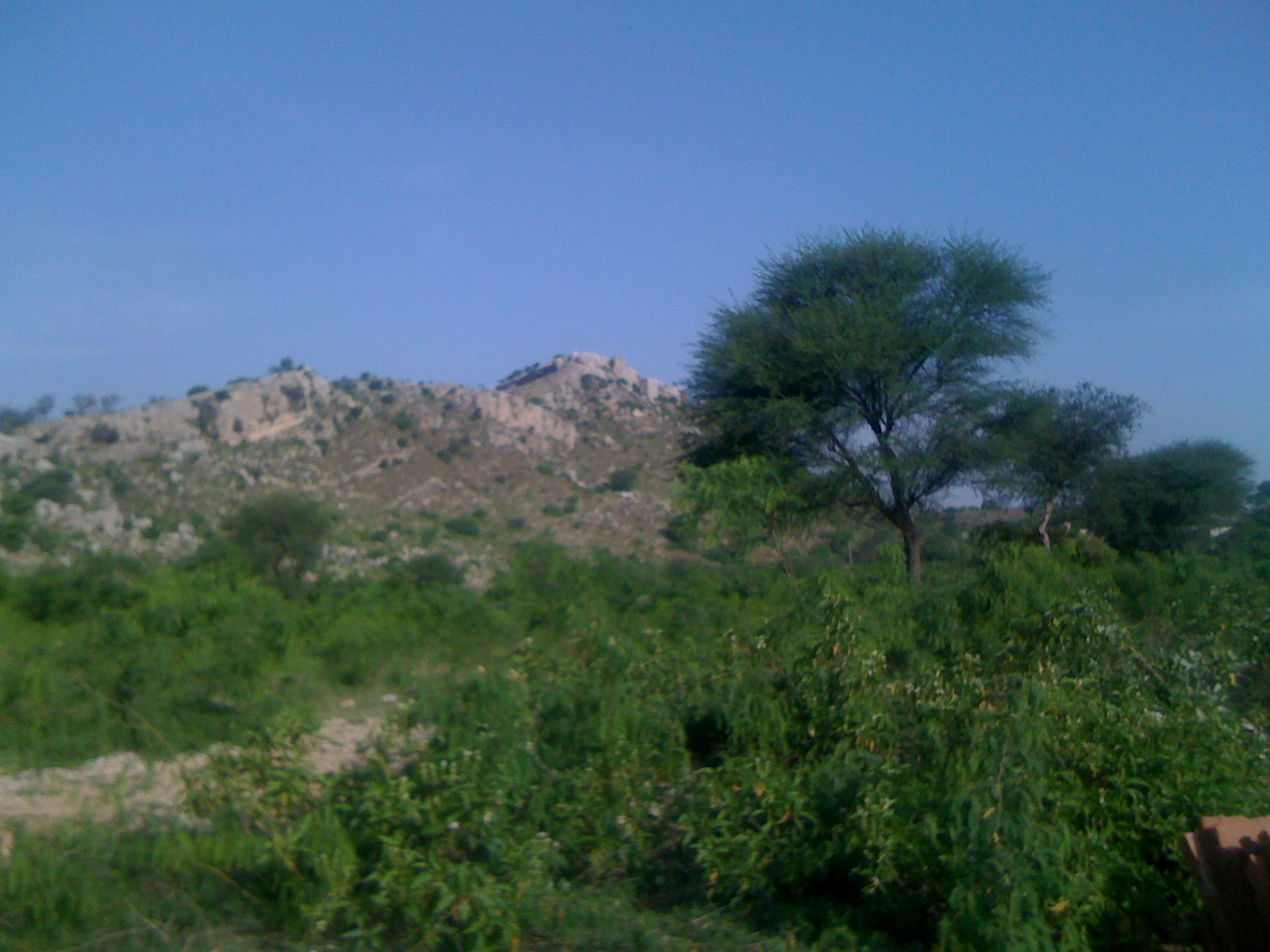
Photo of Karuli Mountain

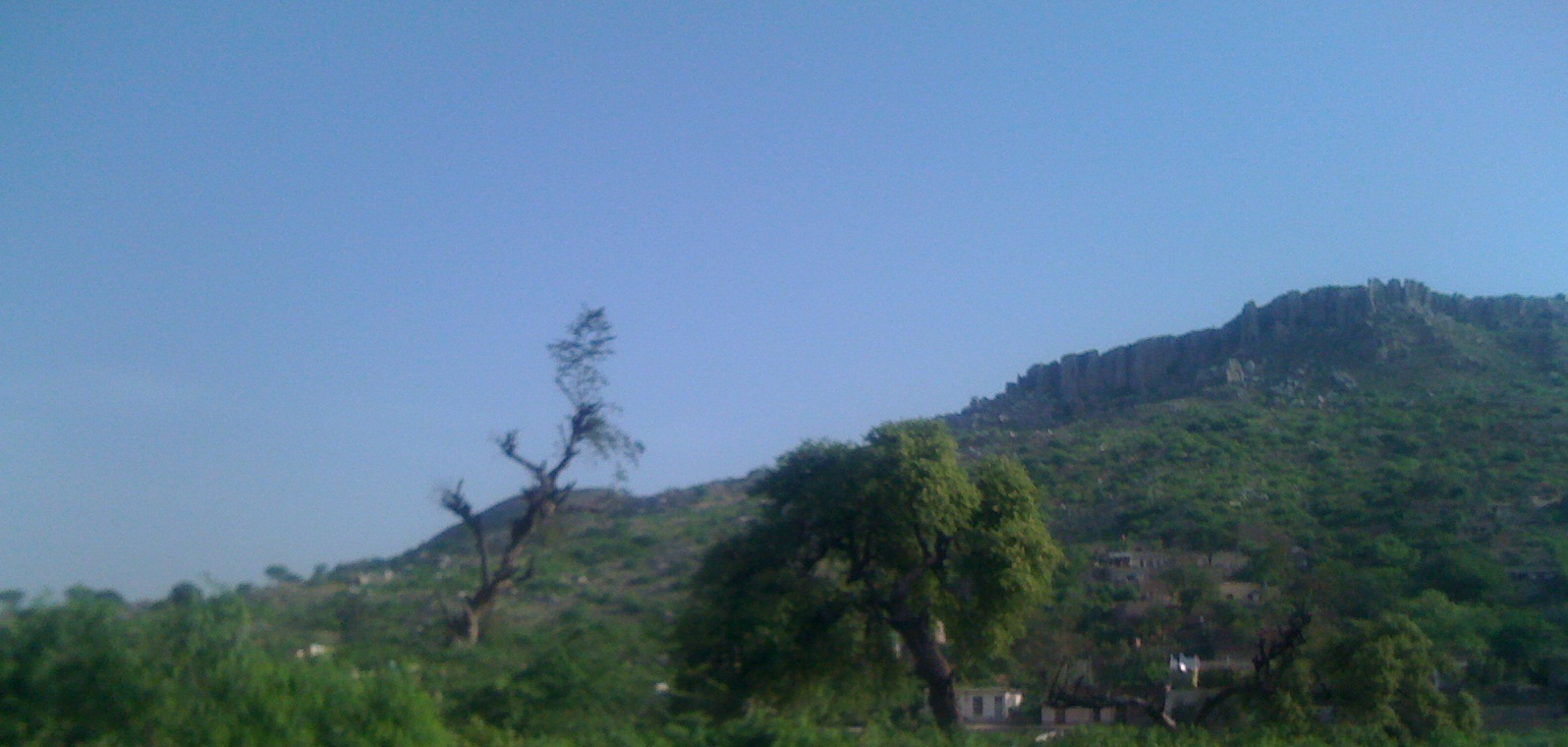
Karuli Village Front

Karuli, or Karuli Piran, is a village of Kallar Kahar Tehsil, Chakwal District, Pakistan. It is located in the Salt Range near the M-2 motorway.

According to village history, the village is named for the time when a "pir" descendant of Sheikh Baha-ud-Din Zakariya came to the area for a spiritual retreat. He rested near the Choa river and used its waters to perform the Islamic cleansing rituals wudu at Karuli.

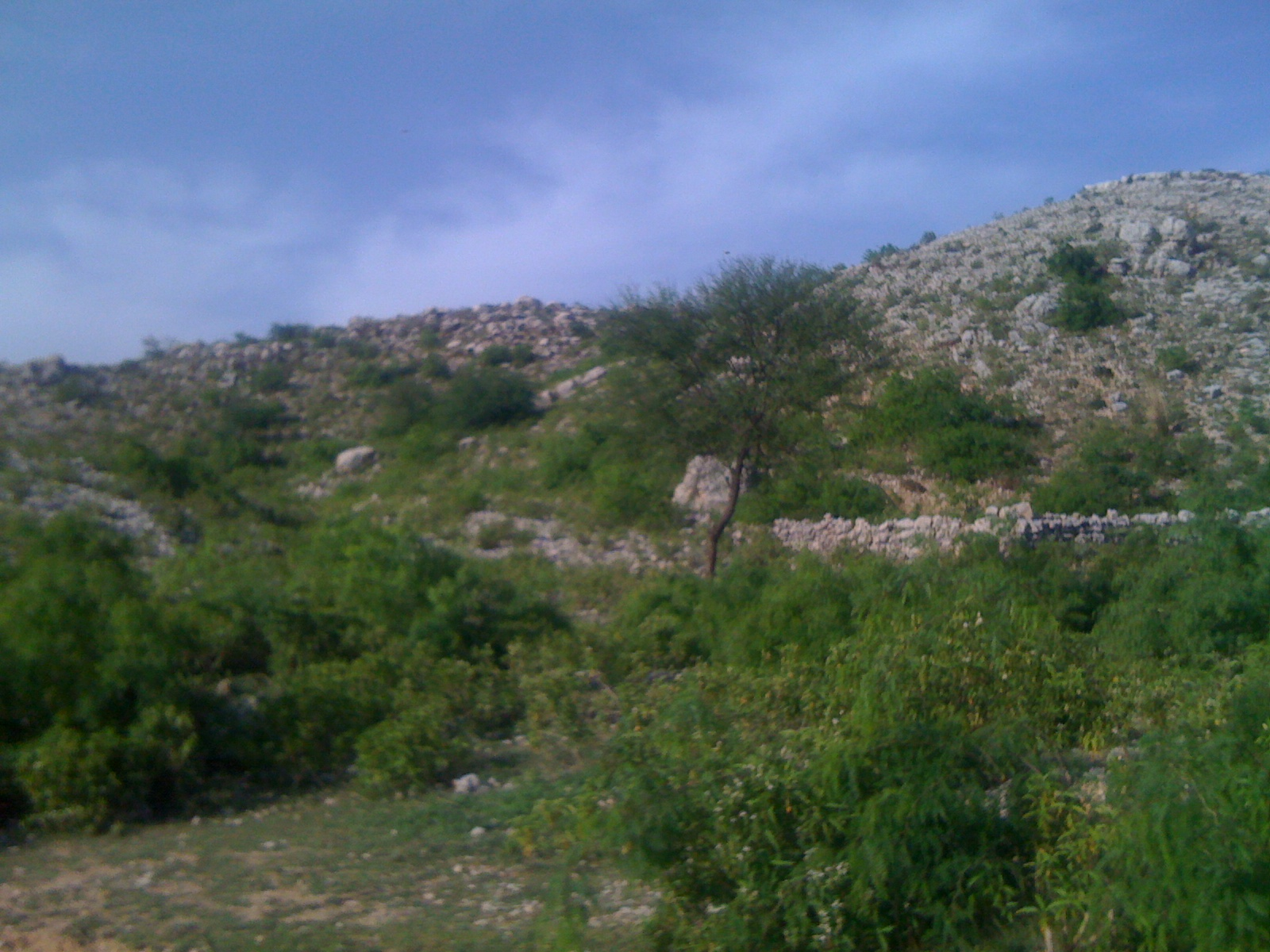
Karuli Village Mountain

The village has a population of about 10,000 people. The local language is Punjabi. The tribe name dwelling there is Malik and Awan. They are Sunni Muslims. Karuli is a lush green area. There is no college, hospital, restaurant, bank or any big beneficial building in the village. Proper roads are a big need of the village along with other basic necessities. Due to lack of resources people are left behind in different fields of modern life.

Geographical coordinates of Karuli are 32° 41' 0" North, 72° 47' 0" East. See Karuli on Google Earth
