= Khanpur, Chakwal =

Khanpur خانپور
- Village
- Country: Pakistan
- Province: Punjab
- District: Chakwal
- Tehsil: Chakwal
- Union Council: Dhuman
- Time zone: UTC+5 (PKT)
- Postal code: 48870

Khanpur (Punjabi, Urdu: خانپور) is a village in Chakwal Tehsil, Chakwal District, Punjab, Pakistan. It lies about 42 kilometers from the M2 motorway, and about 23 kilometers from the district capital, Chakwal. It falls along the Sohawa-Chakwal Road and connects Choa Road with Sohawa-Chakwal Road through Dhok Talian Link Road. Khanpur is the birthplace of Sufi saint Baba Shah Murad, whose shrine is located in the nearby Takya Sah Murad village. Khanpur is a commercial centre of over 150 nearby villages. Sufi saint Muhammad Azam Naqibi (Civil Judge) who also buried in Khanpur graveyard.

Well known Personalities:

Asif Hussain Awan (born 23 May 1972 in Khanpur) is a Pakistani educationist currently serving as a Principal in BPS-19. He has been actively involved in the academic sector and holds a reputable position in the local education community.

He is the son of Ashiq Hussain Awan, a well-known mathematics teacher, who has died.

== Educational institutions ==
- Government Girls College
- Khanpur Grammar School (KGS) Pre-School
- Khanpur Grammar School (KGS) Secondary School
- Government High School For Boys Khanpur
- Government Girls Higher Secondary School Khanpur
- Government Primary School Khanpur
- Air Foundation School System Khanpur Campus
- Lords School Khanpur
- Jinnah Institute Of Science And Commerce For Girls Khanpur
- Khanpur Science And Commerce College For Boys
- Folcon Grammar School Khanpur
- Quaid Academy Public School Khanpur
- Munir Public School Khanpur
- Iqbal Montessori School Khanpur
- Cambridge Science and Commerce College Khanpur
- Allied School Mushtaq Campus Khanpur
