= Bhaun =

Bhaun بھون
- Town
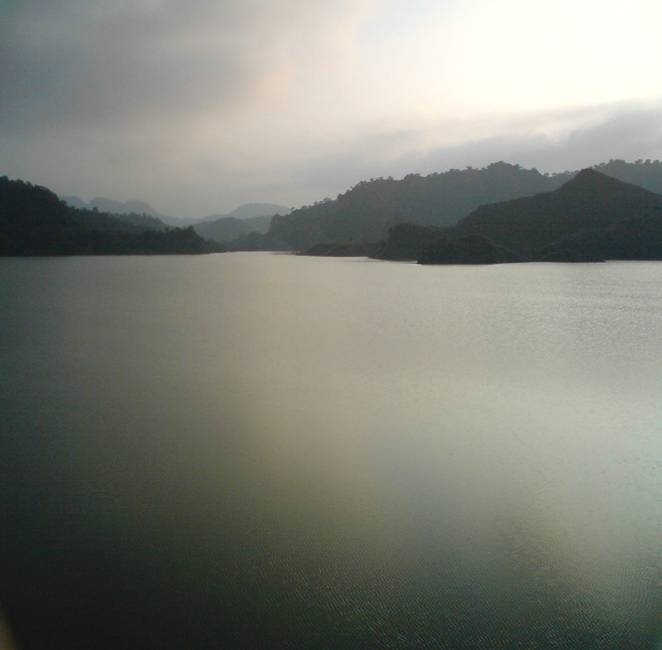
- The nearby Khai Dam Lake

- Location within Punjab, Pakistan Location within Pakistan
- Coordinates: 32°51′35″N 72°45′25″E
- Country: Pakistan
- Province: Punjab
- Province: Chakwal District
- Time zone: UTC+5 (PST)

Bhaun (Urdu: بھون) is a town in Chakwal District in the Punjab province of Pakistan 12 kilometres away from the district capital Chakwal.

Bhaun used to be the terminus of the 74-km long former Mandra–Bhaun Branch Line of Pakistan Railways. The line began at Mandra Junction railway station.

In 2007 Pakistan Railways announced the resumption of the Bhaun to Chakwal service.
