= Sayyad Kasran railway station =

Railway station in Pakistan

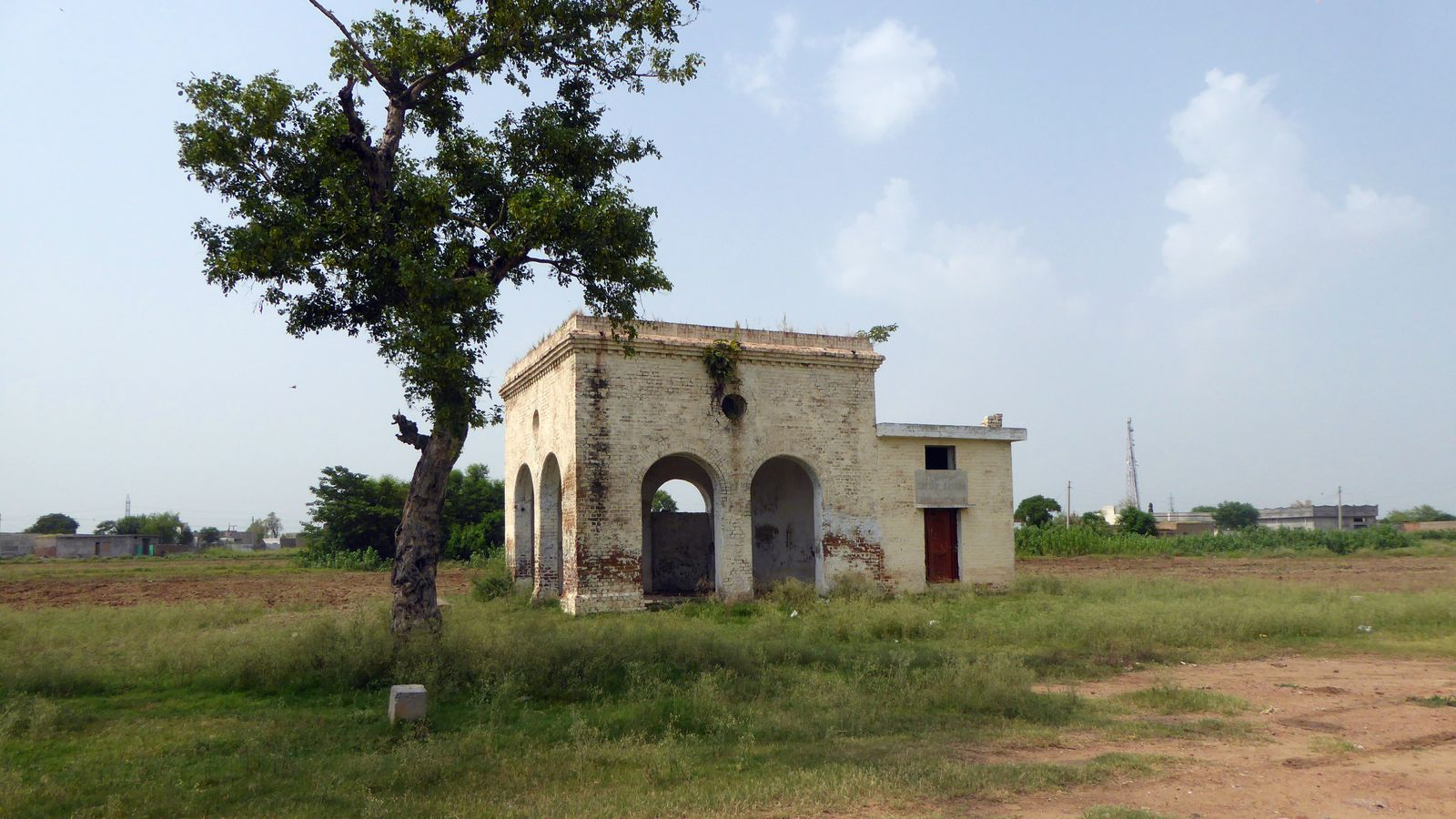

General information
- Owner: Ministry of Railways

Other information
- Station code: SYY
Location

Sayyad Kasran railway station (Urdu: سید کسراں ریلوے اسٹیشن) is inactive railway station located in Chakwal District, Punjab, Pakistan.

== See also ==
- List of railway stations in Pakistan
- Pakistan Railways
