= Syed Kasran =

- Union council
- Country: Pakistan
- Province: Punjab
- District: Rawalpindi
- Tehsil: Gujar Khan

Syed Kasran is a village in Rawalpindi District of Punjab, Pakistan. The village population is about 10,000. The village was built by two brothers who came from Gujrat, Syed Muhammad and Syed Mehmood, son of Zain ul Abideen. They came to this region at the request of Raja Sarang wal e Rawat (though this is unproven). They belonged to the Syed family, which the village is named after. It has a Mazaahar of Shah Nazar and Shah Diwan Kazmi. Syed Kasran (Urdu: سيّدكسراں) also Syed is a town in Gujar Khan Tehsil Punjab, Pakistan. Syed Kasran is also chief town of Union Council Syed Kasran which is an administrative subdivision of the Tehsil.

Syed Kasran is the birthplace of Bari Imam and Kirpal Singh.
