= Saigolabad =

Saigolabad موضع کھوتھیاں
- Khothian
- Location within Pakistan
- Coordinates: 32.893896°N 72.996198°E
- Country: Pakistan
- Province: Punjab
- District: Chakwal

Population
  - Total: 3,338
- Time zone: UTC+5 (PST)

Saigolabad (Urdu: سہگل آباد) is a small town in Chakwal District, Punjab, Pakistan.
