= Hasil =

Pakistani village

Coordinates: 33°10′N 72°33′E

Hasil is a village in Chakwal district, Punjab, Pakistan, with a population of 15,000 on the bank of the Soan River. Hasil Khan Bhatti was founder of Hasil village. Major ethnic group of Hasil village is Rajput Bhatti with sub clans including Kamlal, Barmal, Marhal, Roshnal, Jamdar, Halkar, Jabral, Aklal, Ajmal, Madwal, Buthaal, Parywal, Hattar, Salaar and Moja. Other Castes of Hasil are Arain, Awan, Keery, Syed, Tatri, Ghugh, Ghughar, Jutt, Lohar, Kumbhar, Nai, Mochi, Musalli, Mial, Tarkhan, Pawli, Gondal, Kahoot, Kasar, Dungwal, Machi, Dittial, Panjuthay and migrants. Hasil Khan Bhatti was a descendant of Rai Salaar Khan Bhatti of Pindi Bhattian. Bhatti Rajputs are landowners and landlords of this village. Punjabi is a local language of village.
