= Dullah =

- Village and union council
- Country: Pakistan
- Region: Punjab Province
- District: Chakwal District
- Time zone: UTC+5 (PST)

Dullah is a village and union council of Chakwal District in the Punjab Province of Pakistan. Dullah is a well known place of Chakwal District. Sardar Abdullah Khan Karlal came here in the 18th century. Latitude. 33.1588889°, Longitude. 72.6919444°,
