= Khotian =

Coordinates: 32°46′0″N 73°7′0″E

کھوتھیاں
- Village and union council
- Interactive map of کھوتھیاں
- Country: Pakistan
- Region: Punjab Province
- District: Chakwal District
- Time zone: UTC+5 (PST)

Khotian, also known as Muslim Abad, is a village in Union Council Chakwal, of Chakwal District in the Punjab Province of Pakistan. It is part of Chakwal Tehsil.
