= Dab, Chakwal =

Town in Chakwal District, Punjab, Pakistan

Dab
- Location in Pakistan
- Coordinates: 33°0′N 72°52′E
- Country: Pakistan
- Province: Punjab
- District: Chakwal District
- Time zone: UTC+5 (PST)
  - Summer (DST): +6

Dab is a village and union council of Chakwal District in the Punjab Province of Pakistan, it is part of Chakwal Tehsil.

== Notable people ==
- Khudadad Khan, the first British Indian recipient of the Victoria Cross award.
