= Behkri =

- Location in Pakistan
- Coordinates: 32°57′N 72°52′E
- Country: Pakistan
- Province: Punjab
- District: Chakwal District
- Time zone: UTC+5 (PST)
  - Summer (DST): +6
- Postal code: zip 48888

Behkri is a village in Chakwal District, Punjab, Pakistan. It is located 2.5 miles from the Chakwal city on the Chakwal-Mandra road. Almost the whole village consists of Mair-Minhas, which makes it one of the major concentrations of the Minhas tribe in Chakwal District.With the construction of new road, Chakwal City will soon merge with most of the village resulting in hike in land prices and better economic opportunity for the residents.

Agriculture is the occupation of most of the locals while a considerable number of people are employed in Pakistan Armed Forces. A small minority is overseas including Gulf, Europe and North America.

Livestock including Poultry and Dairy Farming is very popular as the weather conditions support these activities.

There is a Jamia Mosque in the center of the village. A Government primary school for boys and Middle school for girls are also located here. In its east, Pinwal village is situated.

Population: Population of Behkri village has a population of above 4000 persons

Noteables: some notable persons are

1. General Jameel Hadir ex General Pakistan Army.
2. Mrs Rozena Jameel ex MNA from PTI espical seat.
3. Doctor Misri Khan a renowned homeo doctor.
4. Ch Jameel Hadir a politician from PTI.
5. Ch Zaheer Hasan Minhas Advocate a lawyer.
