= Jand Khanzada =

Coordinates: 32°56′0″N 73°6′0″E

- Village and union council
- Interactive map of Jand Khanzada
- Country: Pakistan
- Region: Punjab Province
- District: Chakwal District
- Time zone: UTC+5 (PST)

Jand Khanzada is a village and union council of Chakwal District in the Punjab Province of Pakistan. It is part of Chakwal Tehsil, and is located at 32°55'60N 73°5'60E. The name literally means the village of Khanzada.
