= Behkari Halt railway station =

Railway station in Pakistan

General information
- Owner: Ministry of Railways

Other information
- Station code: BHRI

Behkari Halt railway station (Urdu: بہکاری ہالٹ ریلوے اسٹیشن) is inactive railway station located in Chakwal District, Punjab, Pakistan on Mandra-Bhaun line.

== See also ==
- List of railway stations in Pakistan
- Pakistan Railways
