= Dheedwal =

Settlement in Pakistan

Dheedwal is a town in Chakwal District of Punjab, Pakistan. The town is 17 kilometers from Chakwal city.
