= Chak Umra =

Village and union council in Punjab, Pakistan

Chakumra
- Location in Pakistan
- Coordinates: 32°58′N 72°57′E
- Country: Pakistan
- Province: Punjab
- District: Chakwal District
- Time zone: UTC+5 (PST)
  - Summer (DST): +6

Chak Umra (Urdu: چک عمرا) is a village and union council of Chakwal District in the Punjab Province of Pakistan. It is part of Chakwal Tehsil. There is a Girls' High school in the village, a Maktab Primary and a Primary School for boys. Local agriculture involves cultivation of peanuts and different vegetables.

Chak Umra union council includes the following villages: Chak Umra, Mian Mair, Farid Kassar, Dhoke Hajian Nadral, Dhoke Wadan.
