= Odherwal =

Coordinates: 32°56′0″N 72°48′0″E

- Village and union council
- Interactive map of Odherwal
- Country: Pakistan
- Region: Punjab Province
- District: Chakwal District
- Time zone: UTC+5 (PST)

Odherwal is a village and union council of Chakwal District in the Punjab Province of Pakistan. It is part of Chakwal Tehsil and located at 32°56'0N 72°48'0E.
