= Padshahan =

- Location in Pakistan
- Coordinates: 32°58′N 72°57′E
- Country: Pakistan
- Province: Punjab
- District: Chakwal District

Government
  - Type: Union Council
  - Lieutenant General: Malik Abdul Qayyum, Hi (Military), Politician, Senator belongs to PML-N
  - Military Officer, Educationist, Social Scientist: Brig. (R) Prof. Dr. Allah Bakhsh Malik
  - Military Officer, Defense Analyst: Brig. (R) Muhammad Latif Malik
- Time zone: UTC+5 (PST)
  - Summer (DST): +6
- Postal code: 48760

Padshahan Urdu: پادشاہان is a village and union council of Chakwal District in the Punjab Province of Pakistan. The village and the union council are part of Chakwal Tehsil.
