= Balkassar =

Town in Chakwal District, Punjab, Pakistan

Coordinates: 32°56′0″N 72°39′0″E

- Village and union council
- Interactive map of Balkassar
- Country: Pakistan
- Region: Punjab Province
- District: Chakwal District

Government
- Time zone: UTC+5 (PST)

Balkassar (Urdu: بلکسر) is a village and union council, an administrative subdivision, of Chakwal District in the Punjab Province of Pakistan. Part of Chakwal Tehsil, the village attains its name from the Kassar tribe, who also make up most of the population.

It is one of a cluster of villages such as Chawli, Dhudial, Mangwal, Bikhari Khurd and Balokassar with people of the Kassar tribe.
