= Mulhal Mughlan =

Mulhal Mughlan - ملہال مغلاں
- Village
- Mulhal Mughlan
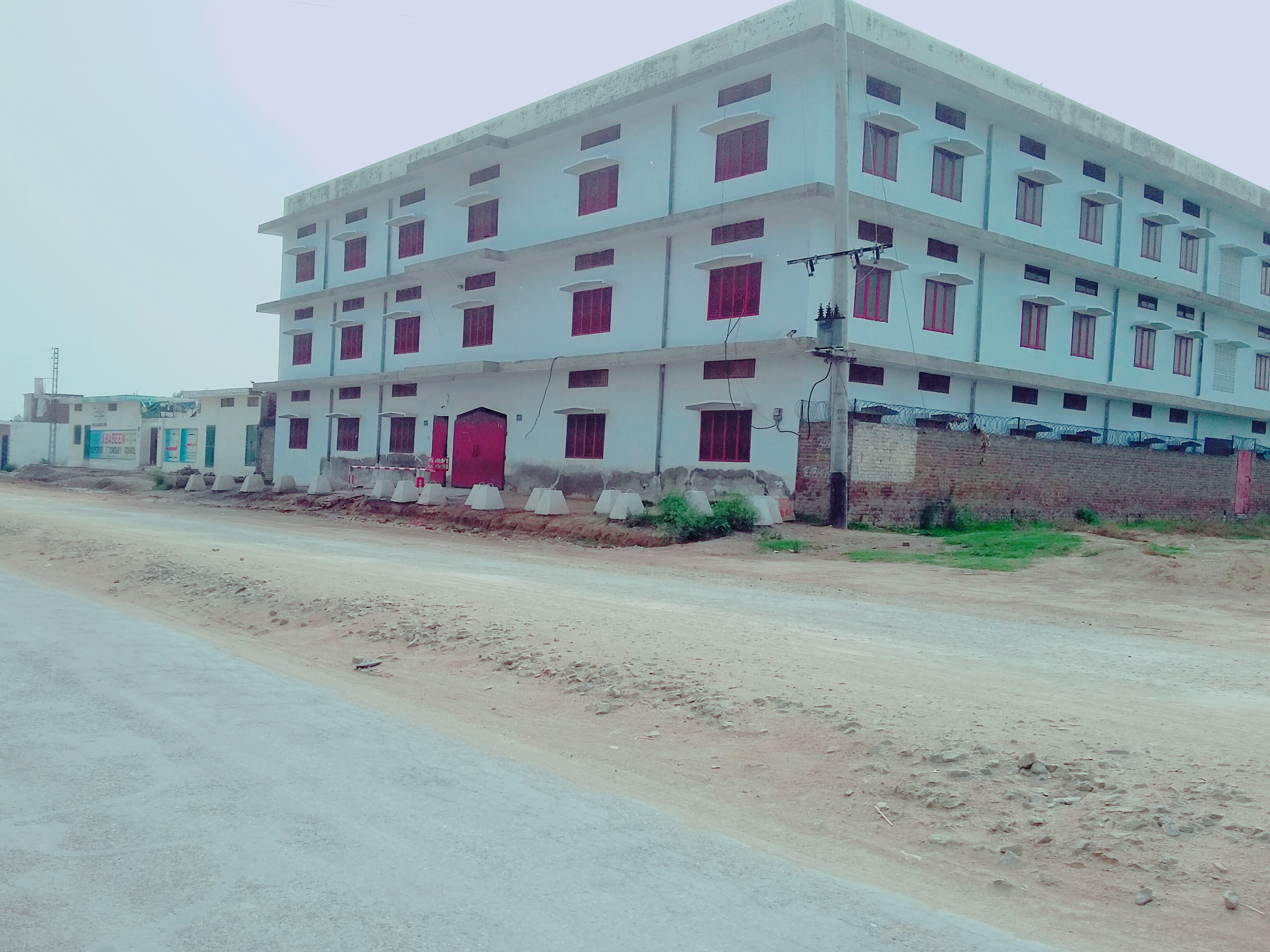
- Mulhal Mughlan School
- Interactive map of Mulhal Mughlan - ملہال مغلاں
- Coordinates: 33°00′13.6″N 73°08′56.0″E
- Country: Pakistan
- Province: (Punjab, Pakistan) Punjab
- District: Chakwal
- Time zone: UTC+5 (PKT)
- Postal code: 48800

Mulhal Mughlan (Urdu: ملہال مغلاں) is a village and union council of Chakwal district in the Punjab Province of Pakistan. It is located on Sohawa-Chakwal Road, which leads to Talagang and Mianwali.

Since 1947 Chakwal was a part of District Jhelum but in 1984 Chakwal became a district with five tehsils. The district is administratively subdivided into five tehsils, including Chakwal, Kallar Kahar, and Choa Saidan Shah Tehsil. Mulhal Mughlan was included in Tehsil Chakwal with Mulhal Mughlan Union Council.

== Facilities ==
Mulhal Mughlan have Facilities of Government and Private Schools and Colleges for Both Boys and Girls, Banks, Pakistan Post Office, Utility Stores, Government and Private Hospitals, Cable TV and a PTCL Telephone Exchange.

Banks includes National Bank of Pakistan (NBP), United Bank Limited (UBL), Muslim Commercial Bank (MCB) and Bank Al-Habib Limited.

Public Transport from Mulhal Mughlan is available to Karachi, Lahore, Rawalpindi, Faisalabad, Chakwal, Gujrat, Gujranwala, Jhelum, Kharian, Sialkot, Wah Cantt, Kamra and Mirpur.

Also Mulhal Mughlan Have Mechanics Shops for Bikes and Cars, Welding Shops, Grocery Stores, Fuel Stations, Hotels, Pharmacies, Book Stores, Fruit Stalls and Bakeries

Oil & Gas Development Company Limited (OGDCL) has two operational fields (1) Rajian Oil Field and (2) Kal Oil Field in the vicinity of Mulhal Mughlan. Mulhal Mughlan also have Police Check Point on Sohawa Chakwal Road.

== Popularity ==
Mulhal Mughlan is also well known as Education Town in that area because there have so many schools and colleges. Blooming Scholars Academy are Most Popular School of Mulhal Mughlan.

== Nearby ==
- Dharuggi Rajgan
- Bhubhar
- Khanpur
- Dhudial
