= Dhruggi Rajgan =

Dharuggi-Rajgan is a village of Rajput Chohan caste. Dharuggi-Rajgan is located in union council Mulhal Mughlan, Chakwal District of the Punjab province, Pakistan. The village is located on the main Chakwal-Jehlum road.
