= Balokassar =

Town in Chakwal District, Punjab, Pakistan

- Village and union council
- Country: Pakistan
- Region: Punjab Province
- District: Chakwal District
- Time zone: UTC+5 (PST)

Balokassar Urdu: بلوکسر is a village and union council of Chakwal District in the Punjab Province of Pakistan. Part of Chakwal Tehsil, the village gets its name from the Kassar tribe, who make up the majority of the population.

It is one of a cluster of villages such as Balkassar, which form the tribal homeland of the Kassar.
