= Dhudial =

- Village and union council
- Location in Pakistan
- Coordinates: 33°03′54″N 72°58′13″E
- Country: Pakistan
- Region: Punjab Province
- District: Chakwal District
- Time zone: UTC+5 (PST)

Dhudial is a village, union council, and administrative subdivision of Chakwal District in the Punjab Province of Pakistan. It is part of Chakwal Tehsil. It is one of the largest villages of Chakwal District and is located about 70 km south of the capital Islamabad. Members of the Kassar tribe make up the bulk of the population. It is one of a cluster of villages such as Balkassar, Chawli, Mangwal and Balokassar, which were the tribal homeland of the Kassar.

Population

It is one the biggest village by population in district Chakwal. Almost having 50,000 population. It is known for making industrial area for agricultural machinery.
