= Chakwal Tehsil =

Chakwal Tehsil تحصِيل چکوال
- Tehsil
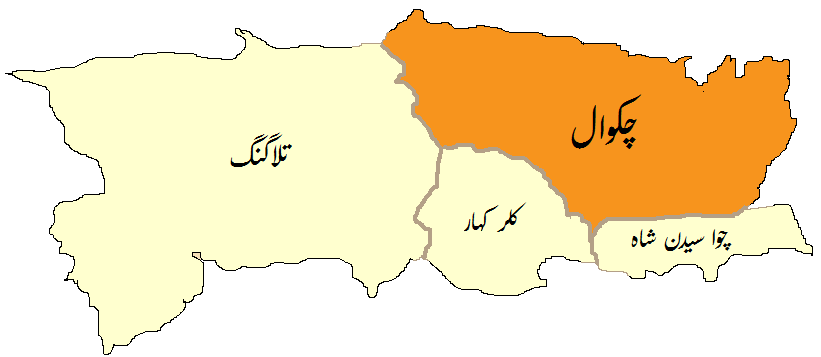
- Country: Pakistan
- Region: Punjab
- District: Chakwal District
- Capital: Chakwal
- Towns: 1
- District Council: Chakwal
- No. of Union Councils: 30 (5 urban+ 25 rural)

Area
  - Tehsil: 3,120 km^{2} (1,200 sq mi)

Population (2023)
  - Tehsil: 768,622
  - Density: 246/km^{2} (638/sq mi)
  - Urban: 244,042 (31.75%)
  - Rural: 524,580 (68.25%)
- Time zone: UTC+5 (PST)
  - Summer (DST): UTC+5 (PDT)
- Website: TMA Chakwal

Chakwal Tehsil (Urdu: تحصِيل چکوال), is an administrative subdivision (tehsil) of Chakwal District in the Punjab province of Pakistan. The tehsil is subdivided into 30 Union Councils - five of which form the capital Chakwal. During British rule the tehsil was part of Jhelum District. According to the 1901 census, the population was 160,316 compared to 164,912 in 1891. At the time the tehsil contained 248 villages.

Name Of Union Council & Its Population (1998)
Union Council	Population ( Thousand Persons)
Chakwal City-1	15475
Chakwal City-2	16172
Chakwal City-3	14909
Chakwal City-4	17302
Chakwal City-5	16650
Mureed	15971
Odherwal	18973
Karyala	16212
Dab	21397
Balkassar	20408
Dhudial	13682
Saral	15253
Mangwal	17245
Chak Umra	17288
Padshahan	15760
Chak Malook	19888
Bheen	10050
Balkassar	19866
Warwal	14097
Dullah	14859
Begal	15149
Kot Chaudhrian	15429
Karsal	11991
Jand	16413
Mulhal Mughlan	19390
Jandkhan Zada	11366
Dumman	9842
Khotian (Sehgalabad)	18755
Choa Ganj Ali Shah	12225
Jaswal	14186
