= Mandra Railway Station =

Railway station in Pakistan

Mandra Railway Station مندرہ ریلوے اسٹیشن
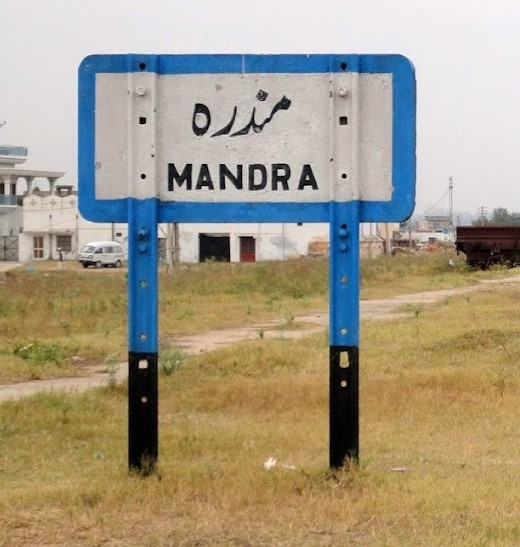

General information
- Coordinates: 33.3647°N 73.2377°E
- Owner: Ministry of Railways
- Lines: Karachi–Peshawar Railway Line; Mandra–Bhaun Railway
- Platforms: 2
- Tracks: 4

Construction
- Structure type: Standard (on ground station)
- Platform levels: 1
- Parking: Available
- Accessible: Available

Other information
- Status: Functional
- Station code: MNA
- Fare zone: Pakistan Railways Rawalpindi Zone

History
- Opened: 1916; 110 years ago

Services
Preceding station	Pakistan Railways	Following station
Ghungrila towards Kiamari	Karachi–Peshawar Line	Kaliamawan towards Peshawar Cantonment
Terminus	Mandra–Bhaun Railway (defunct)	Taragarh towards Bhaun
Location

Mandra railway Station (Urdu and Punjabi: مندرہ ریلوے اسٹیشن) is located in Mandra, Gujar Khan Tehsil, Rawalpindi District of Punjab, Pakistan. This station is located on the Karachi–Peshawar Railway Line. Mandra was a junction railway station from here trains go to Chakwal via Mandra–Bhaun Railway. Mandra railway station consists of two platforms. As of 2026, it is only a railway station, the status of junction has been ended since 1993.

== History ==
Mandra Railway Station was established in 1916 by British.

== Current status ==
This station is used by Pakistan Railways. There is a car parking facility, water coolers, toilets and rest areas.

== Location ==
Mandra Junction Railway Station is located at Railway Road, Mandra. And this station is at a distance of 40 km from Rawalpindi.

== Mandra–Bhaun Branch Line ==
The Mandra–Bhauan railway line was connected to Chakwal, which is now dismantled.

== Gallery ==
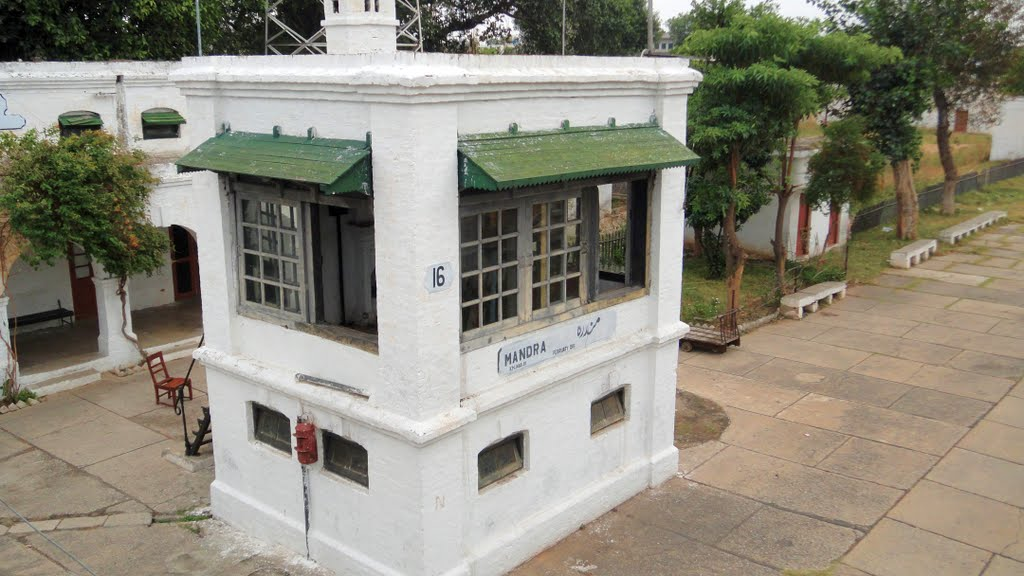

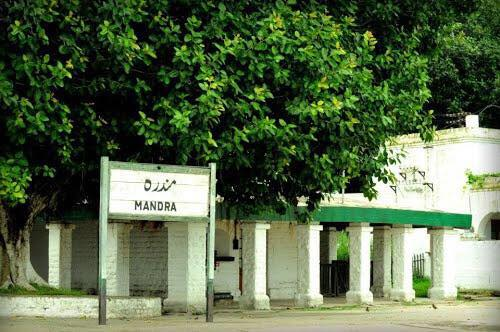

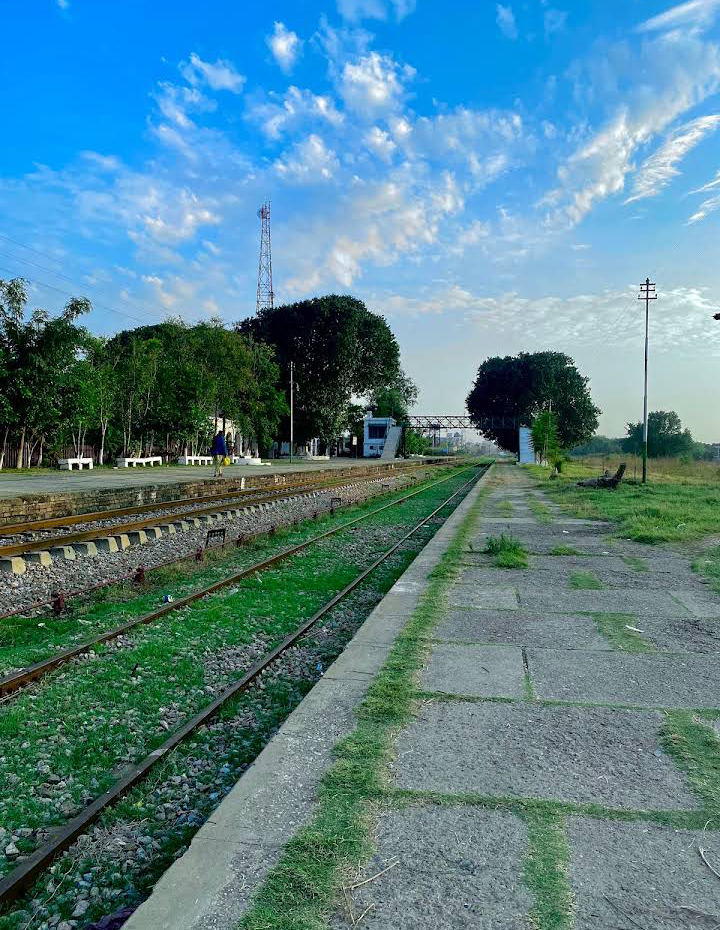

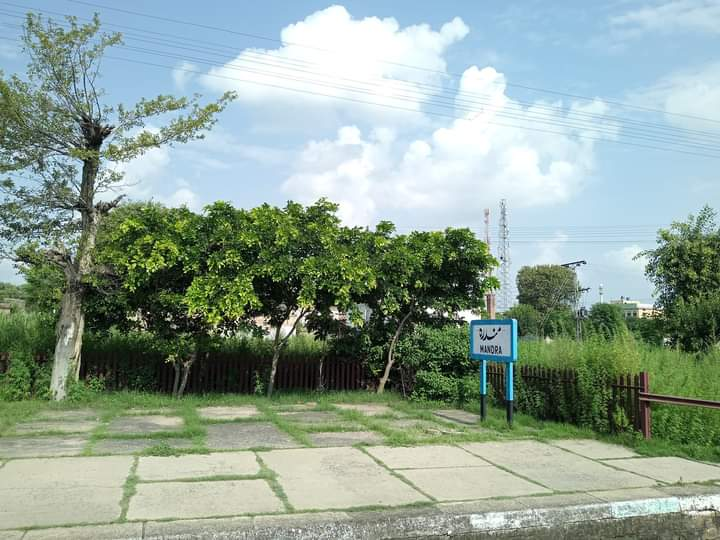

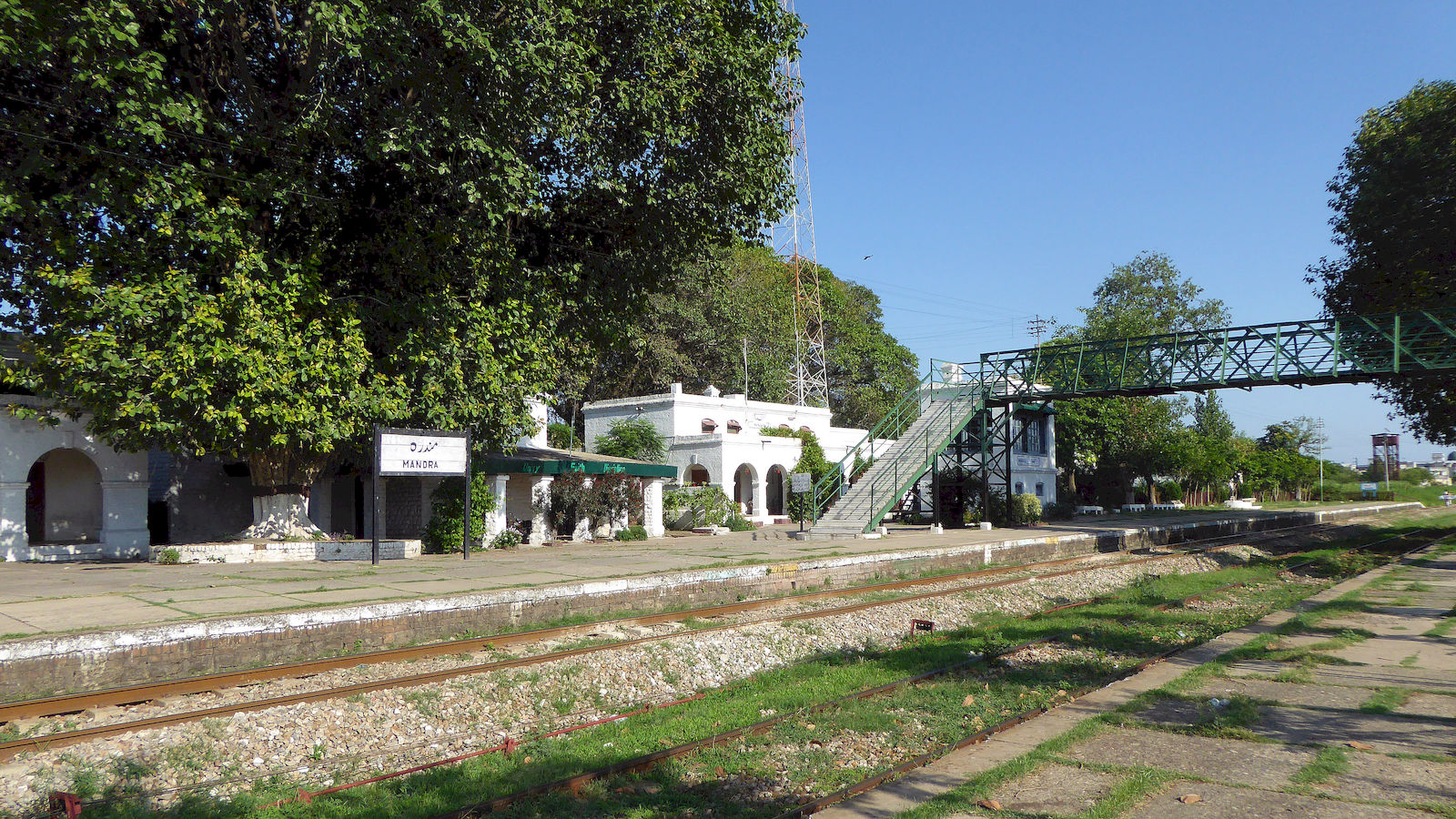
View from platform 2

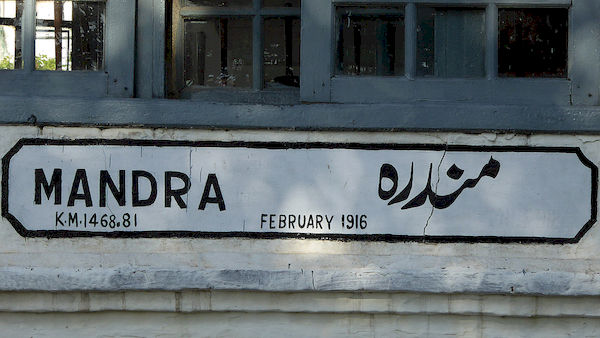
Station tag 1

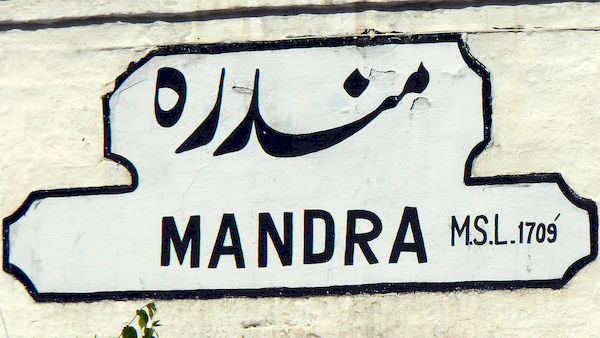
Station tag 2

== See also ==
- List of railway stations in Pakistan
- Pakistan Railways
- Mandra–Bhaun Railway
