= Mangwal, Pakistan =

Coordinates: 33°6′30″N 72°49′32″E

Mangwal
- Village and union council
- Interactive map of Mangwal
- Country: Pakistan
- Region: Punjab Province
- District: Chakwal District

Government
- Time zone: UTC+5 (PST)
- Almost whole population of Mangwal consist of MUSLIM

Mangwal is a village and union council of Chakwal District in the Punjab Province of Pakistan. It is part of Chakwal Tehsil, and is located at 33°6'30 N 72°49'32 E.

== History ==
During the British rule, Mangwal was part of Chakwal tehsil, which itself was an important tehsil of Jhelum district. While the rest of the residents of other tehsils were referred to as Jhelumis, the residents of Chakwal were particularly called Chakwalias. The original inhabitants of Mangwal belonged to the Mughal Kassar tribe. According to local tradition, Mughal prince Sardar Mango Khan, son of Sardar Lakhan Khan, suggested the name 'Mangowal' meaning a place where the descendants of Mango Khan live. Mangwal was well known for its market, and people from Attock, the outskirts of Chakwal, and Jhelum came there to trade goods and necessities. The people of Mangwal have been well-to-do since then. Looking at the History the famous fight between Sardar Khan Nawab and 7 chiefs of different tribes was one of the most tragic conflicts in the area's history and is still remembered today.

== See also ==
- Mangwal, Afghanistan
