= List of villages in Jhelum District =

Jhelum District is an administrative district in the Punjab province. It is divided into four tehsils and a total of 52 union councils (UCs), which serve as the primary local government and administrative units.

== Tehsils and Union Councils ==
- Jhelum Tehsil (17 UCs)
  - Badlot
  - Boken
  - Chak Khasa
  - Chotala
  - Darapur
  - Dhanyala
  - Garh Mahal
  - Kala Gujran
  - Khukha
  - Kotla Faqir
  - Madu Kalas
  - Monan
  - Mughalabad
  - Nakka Khurd
  - Nara
  - Sultanpur
  - Sanghoi
- Dina Tehsil (11 UCs)
  - Ladhar
  - Danyala
  - Madu Kalas
  - Dina
  - Sohan
  - Janjeel
  - Khambal
  - Goharabad
  - Mughlabad
  - Pandori
  - Sultanpur
- Pind Dadan Khan Tehsil (15 UCs)
  - Ahmedabad
  - Chak Shadi
  - Daulatpur
  - Dharyala Jalap
  - Gharibwal
  - Golepur
  - Gujjar
  - Haranpur
  - Pinanwal
  - Jalalpur Sharif
  - Kandwal
  - Khewra
  - Lilla
  - Pindi Saidpur
  - Tobah
- Sohawa Tehsil (9 UCs)
  - Adrana
  - Domeli
  - Jajial
  - Kohali
  - Lehri
  - Nagial
  - Pail Bane Khan
  - Phulray Syedan
  - Pind Matay Khan

== Administration ==
Union councils form the lowest tier of local government in Pakistan. Each UC is headed by an elected chairman and council, and is responsible for municipal-level services and community governance.

== See also ==
- Jhelum District
- Tehsils of Pakistan
- Union councils of Pakistan
- Local government in Pakistan
