= Raiya Chak Maddu =

Pakistani village

Raiya Chak Maddu, Punjab رائیہ چک مدو Raya Chak Maddo
- Village
- Location in Pakistan
- Coordinates: 32°55′36″N 73°41′5″E
- Country: Pakistan
- Province: Punjab
- District: Jhelum
- Tehsil: Jhelum
- Police Station: Saddar Jhelum District
- Union Council: Monan, Punjab
- Post Office: Village Lota, Punjab
- Elevation: 230 m (760 ft)
- Time zone: UTC+5 (PST)
  - Summer (DST): UTC+6 (PST)
- Postal Code: 49601
- Area code: 0544
- Local Bank: National Bank of Pakistan Muhammadi Bazar Branch Jhelum

Raiya Chak Maddu (pronounced [raːiːja tʃək məd̪u]) is a village in the union council of Monan, in Jhelum Tehsil. The village is part of the Jhelum District of the Punjab province of Pakistan.

== Notable people ==
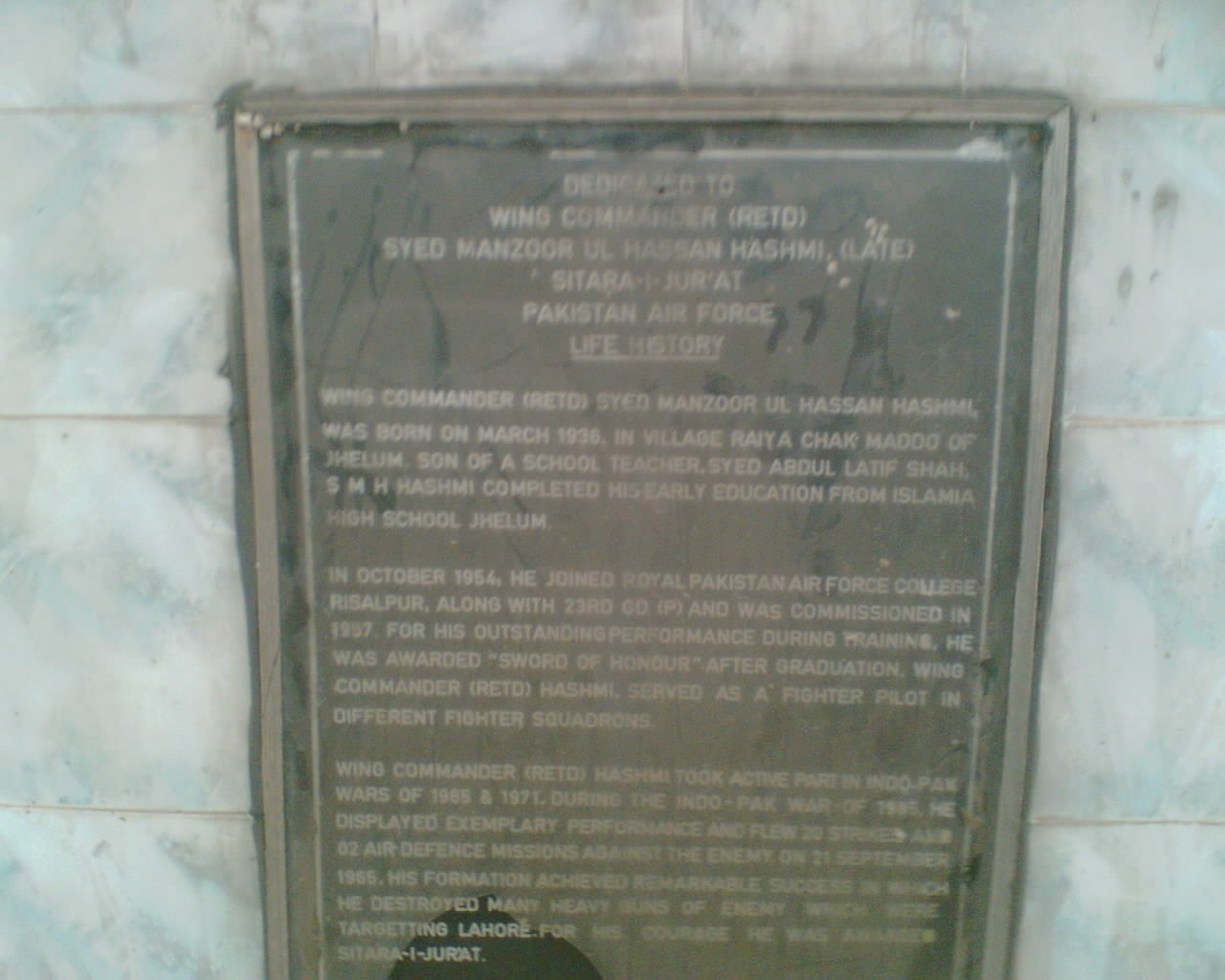
An inscription near a F-6 aircraft installed by the PAF in Jhelum Cantonment details the life and service of Wing Commander Hashmi

- Syed Manzoor ul Hassan Hashmi (Late) Ex-Wing Commander PAF

== Gallery ==
Village scene

Village main pond

Village main pond
