= Mamman =

- Pronunciation: MaM-Man
- Gender: Male
- Language: Hausa

Origin
- Origin: Nigeria
- Derivation: Muhammad
- Meaning: Trustworthy or Reliable
- Region of origin: Northern Nigeria

Mamman, also spelt as Maman or Mamane is a masculine given name of the Hausa origin. It is the contracted form of Muhammad, which means trustworthy or reliable.

== Notable people Bearing the name include ==
- Mamman Bello Ali (1958–2009), Nigerian Senator for Yobe South, Governor of Yobe State from 2007 to his death
- Mamman Jiya Vatsa (1940–1986), Nigerian soldier and writer
- Mamman Kontagora, Military Administrator of the Abuja Federal Capital Territory during the transitional regime of General Abdulsalam Abubakar
- Sama'ila Mamman, elected Senator for the Katsina Central constituency of Katsina State, Nigeria
- Saleh Mamman, Minister of power in Nigeria
- Mamman Shata, Nigerian Hausa Singer
- Tahir Mamman, Nigerian lawyer, professor and academic
- Mamman Sani, Nigerien musician
- Maman Sani Maigochi, Nigerien musician

== See also ==
- Ensamma mamman ("single mom") is a Swedish comic strip created by Cecilia Torudd

- 'Amman
- Ammann
- Hamman
- Hammann
- Mamane
- Mammon
- Mammone
- Mamyan
- Miamian
