= Dhoke Jamarghal =

Dhoke Jamarghal ڈھوک جمرغال
- Hamlet
- Location within Punjab, Pakistan Dhoke Jamarghal (Pakistan)
- Coordinates: 32°51′0.0426″N 73°33′59.0616″E
- Country: Pakistan
- Province: Punjab
- District: Jhelum
- Tehsil: Dina
- Union Council: Janjeel
- Post Office: Nathwala

Government
  - Type: Union Council
- Elevation: 271 m (889 ft)
- Time zone: UTC+5 (PKT)

Dhoke Jamarghal (Urdu: ڈھوک جمرغال), also known as Dera Jammargal, is a hamlet located in the Jhelum District of Punjab, Pakistan. It is part of Dina Tehsil and comes under the Janjeel Union Council. It is located 18.08 kilometers southwest of Jhelum city and 56.84 kilometers northeast of Pind Dadan Khan.

== Administration ==
Historically, it has been always part of Sanghoi union council of Jhelum tehsil but in 2005 Dina tehsil was formed and Janjeel union council was created under it. This hamlet was inducted into these entities at that time.

== Geography ==
It is located in southern part of Dina tehsil.
