= Dhamyal Town =

- Village
- Dhamyal Town
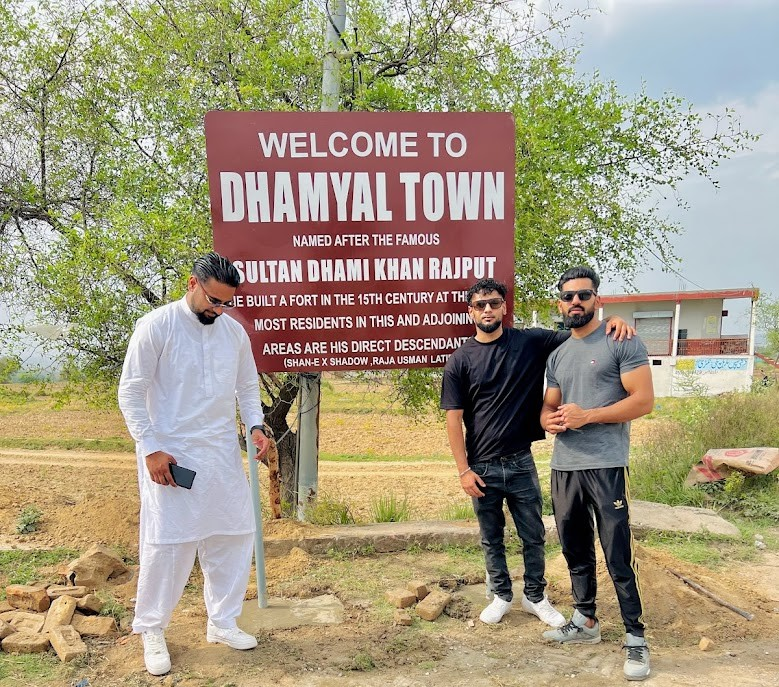

- Location within Pakistan
- Coordinates: 33.12°N 73.28°E
- Country: Pakistan
- Province: Punjab
- District: Jhelum
- Tehsil: Sohawa
- Settled: AD 1190

Area
  - Total: 6.2 km^{2} (2.4 sq mi)
- Elevation: 447 m (1,467 ft)

Population (2025)
  - Total: 348
  - Density: 100/km^{2} (260/sq mi)
- Time zone: UTC+5 (PST)
- Calling code: 0544

Dhamyal Town (Urdu: دھمیال ٹاؤن) is a village of Jhelum District in the Punjab province of Pakistan. It is located at 33°19'0N 73°44'0E with an altitude of 447 metres (1,467 ft). Dhamyal Town is approximately less than a mile away from the famous Muhammad of Ghor's tomb.

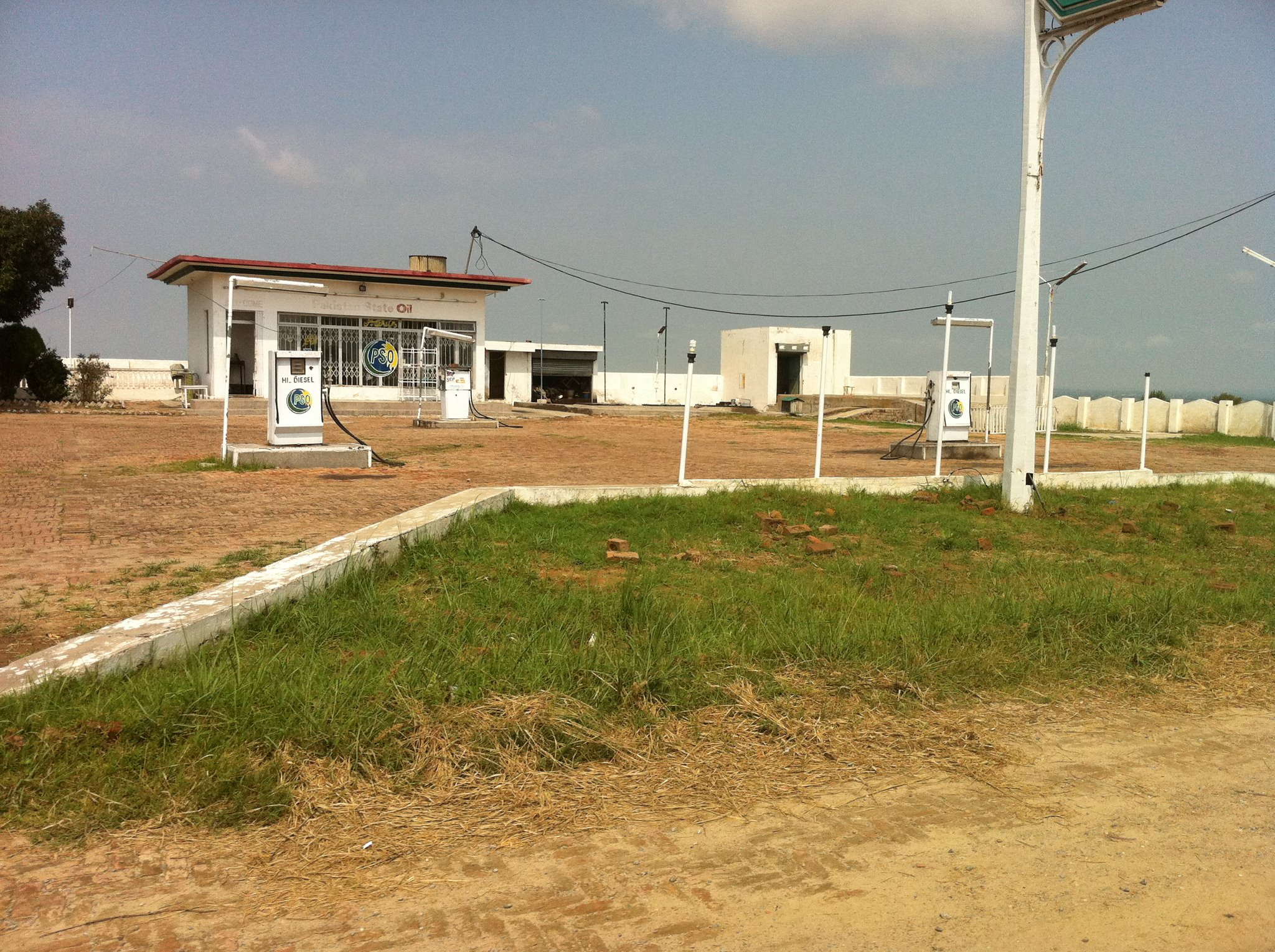
PSO Petrol Station within the Dhamyal Town area is the only fuel station within the radius of 20 km and is main source of fuel for UC PBK.

== History ==
The name Dhamyal Town (Also spelled as Dhamial Town) was taken from the locals' history. Dhamyal caste is a branch of the well known Rajput tribe. The village itself was formed in early as 12th century after Muhammad of Ghor invaded and conquered India. The Village has had a few names in the past but most of those were related to Dhamyal or Dhamial which is the name of the Jatt tribe residing within the place.

In 2021, Raja Usman Latif transported soil samples from the vicinity of Dhamyal town to laboratories in the United Kingdom. The analysis of these samples revealed evidence of historical residency in the area dating back 1000 years

The terrain in the vicinity of Dhamyal town was found to be abundant with stones that are typically only found underwater in other regions of the world. Based on this discovery, researchers have postulated that the area was submerged underwater following the latest Ice Age.

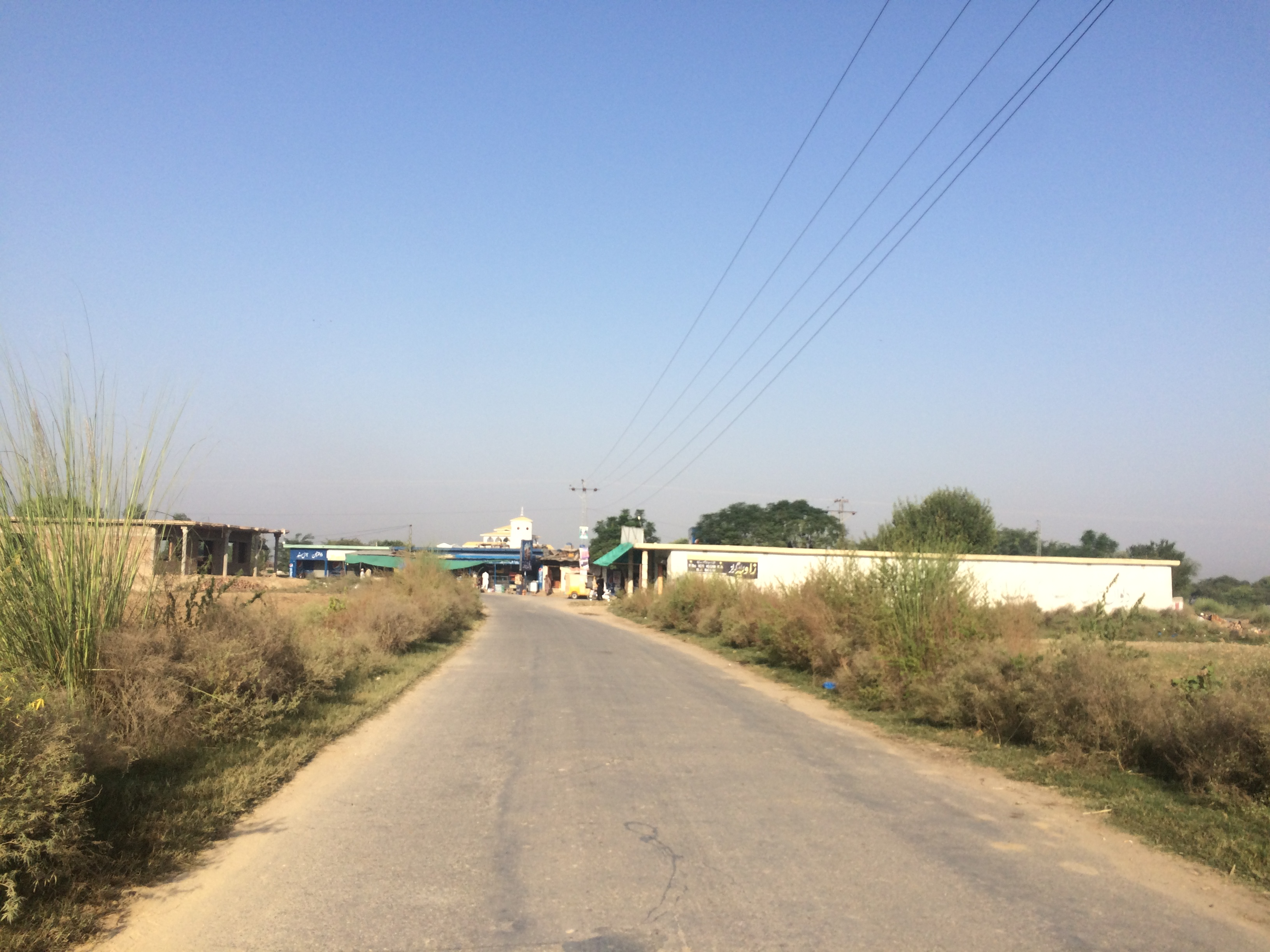
Road leading to Dhamyal Town from Khiryot

== Health ==
Dhamyal Town has its own local Government hospital and has several doctors working in it. The hospital is the centre of health facilities within the suburbs of Dhamyal Town and even other villages around it.

== Education ==
There is a Govt Higher Secondary school within the town itself and a boy's primary school as well as a boy's high school within a 1-mile radius of the town. Several academics from Dhamyal town are working around the country and the globe. Dhamyal town has a literacy rate of 98%, higher than any other village in the suburbs. The majority of the natives are fluent in English, Urdu and Punjabi.

== People ==
With most of the natives having families in Europe especially within the United Kingdom, Dhamyal town has a very high Human Development Index compared to most parts of Pakistan.

In the past, there were many people in Army from the village, and almost every family had a war veteran.

In recent years it had also come to light that a young man named Mohammed Ali from this area was enrolled in the British Indian army in the 1910s before the 1st world War and died in the WW1. His grave is in the Tinsley Park Cemetery in the South Yorkshire region of United Kingdom.

== Climate ==
Dhamyal town is located right in the centre of the Potohar region and the climate is usually very warm. Even in the winter months, temperatures can be as high as 25 °C. During the summer months, especially June and July, temperatures can reach up to 50 °C regularly.

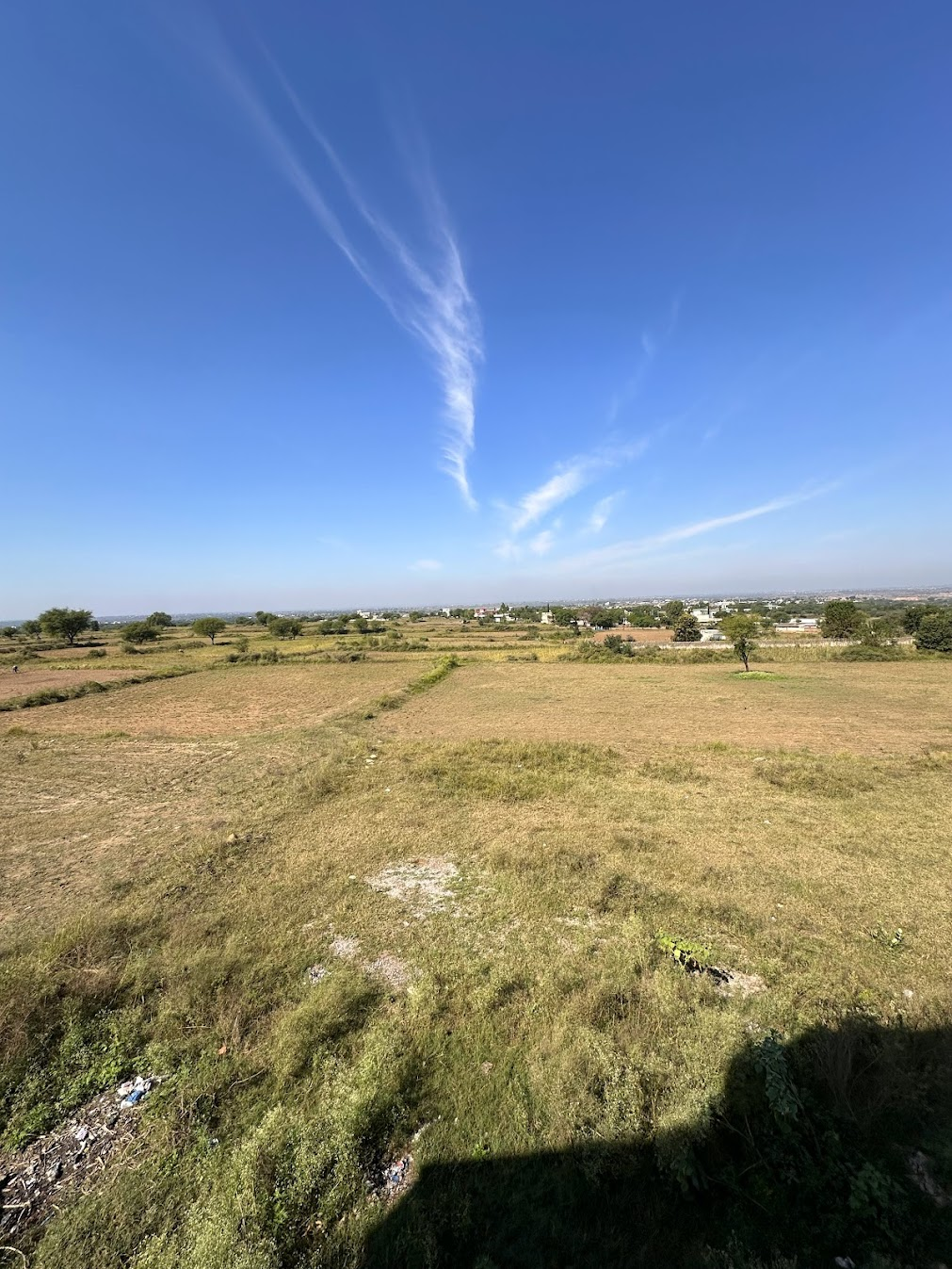

== Amenities ==
Dhamyal town residents enjoy a host of amenities including accessible shopping centres, local bakery, fuel station and other essential items.

== Sport ==
Cricket, volleyball and football are popular among the youth of the village. Since early 1980s cricket has been the dominant game in village with cricket grounds available throughout the year, most youths are playing it throughout the year.

== Travel guide ==
Because the village is located in the heartland of Potohar region of Pakistan, it is a conservative part of the country. Religiously and culturally, this area is reasonably conservative. It is advised to respect the local culture when visiting.

The people of the village are very welcoming due to their exposure to foreigners and the level of education in the area. Over the past few decades, a number of foreigners have visited the village on different occasions.

The United Kingdom foreign and Commonwealth office lists the area as a safe travel zone. (As of June 2025)

A comprehensive street view was launched in November 2025 on Google, making this village one of the very few in the country to be on Google Street View.
