= Pind Sawika =

Pind Sawika پنڈ سوکہ
- Village
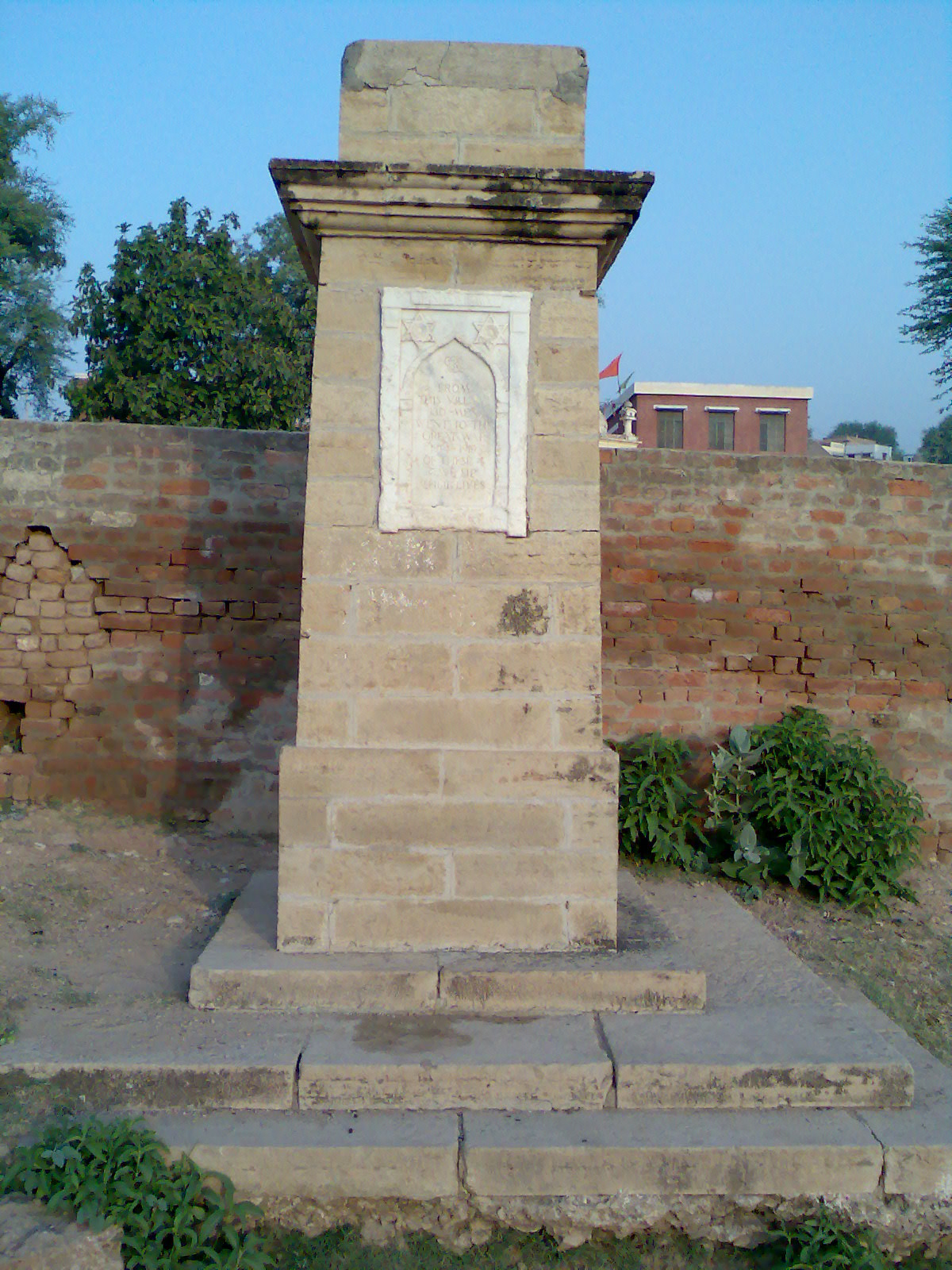
- Pind Sawika Monument

- Location within Punjab, Pakistan Pind Sawika (Pakistan)
- Coordinates: 32°46′11.6868″N 73°21′44.9382″E
- Country: Pakistan
- Province: Punjab
- District: Jhelum
- Tehsil: Dina
- Union Council: Nara

Government
  - Type: Union Council
- Elevation: 319 m (1,047 ft)

Population (2017)
  - Total: 2,789
  - Estimate (2023): 2,799
- Time zone: UTC+5 (PKT)

Pind Sawika (Urdu: پنڈ سوکہ), also written as Pind Sawaikah, is a village in the Jhelum District of Punjab, Pakistan, on the right bank of the Naalah Bunhan at the start of the Tilla Jogian mountain range. It is part of Dina Tehsil and comes under Nara Union Council. It is located 38.98 kilometers southwest of Jhelum city and 35.96 kilometers northeast of Pind Dadan Khan.

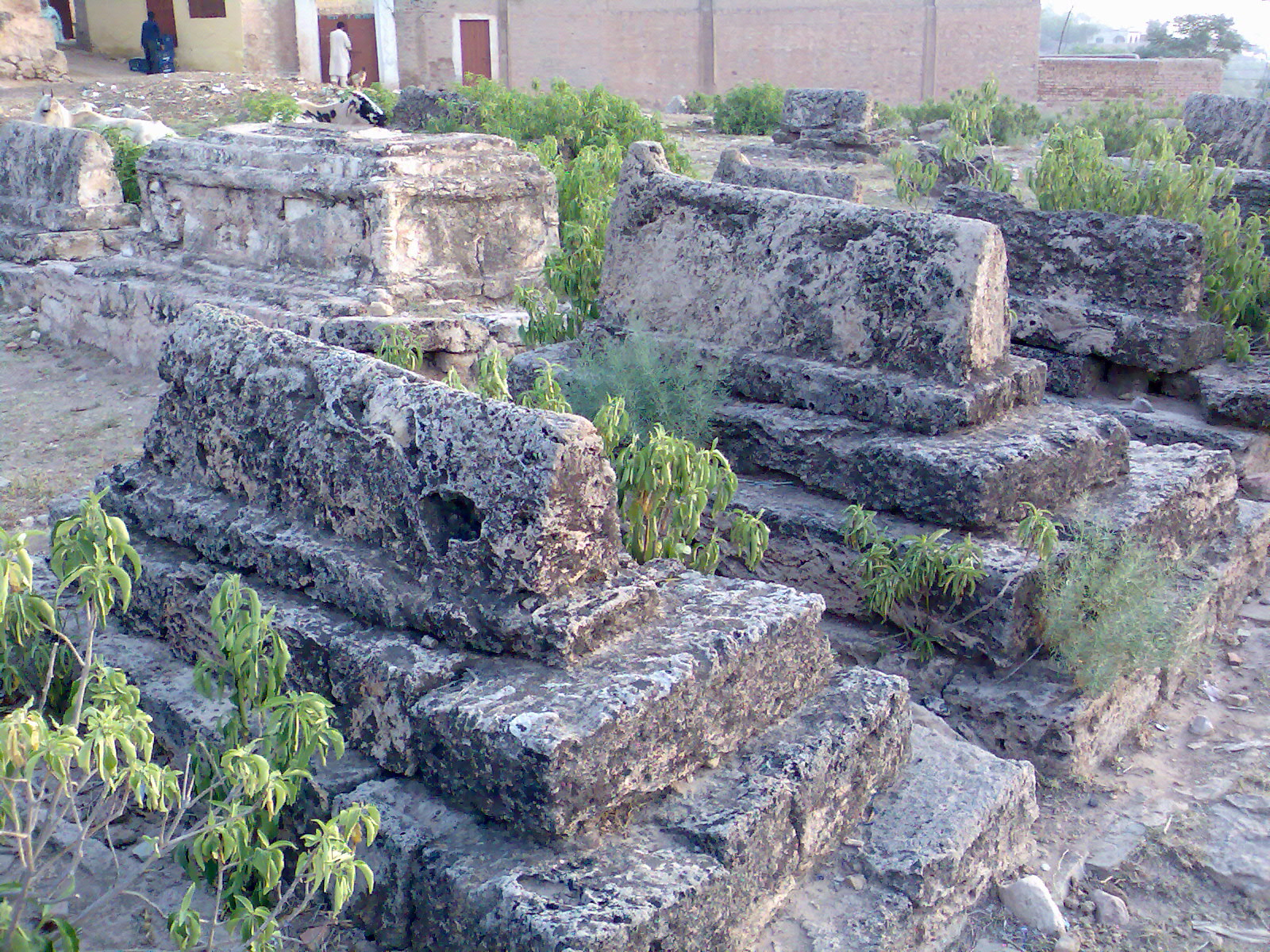
Ancient graveyard

== Administration ==
Before 2005, Pind Sawika was a constituent of the Nara union council within the Jhelum tehsil. However, in 2005, with the formation of Dina tehsil, encompassing the Nara union council, Pind Sawika came to be part of Dina tehsil.

== Geography ==
It is located at the southwestern corner of Dina tehsil and borders Jhelum tehsil.

== Demographics ==
Historical population
Census	Pop.	Time span (yrs)	%±	Annual RoG %±
1951	1,650	—	—	—
1972	2,534	21	53.58%	2.06%
1981	2,730	9	7.73%	.83%
1998	2,939	17	7.66%	.44%
2017	2,789	19	-5.38%	-.28%
2023 (est)	2,799	6	.36%	.06%
