= Jakkar =

Jakkar جکر
- Village
- Location within Pakistan
- Coordinates: 33°02′N 73°43′E
- Pakistan: Pakistan
- Province: Punjab
- District: Jhelum
- Elevation: 231 m (758 ft)

Jakkar is a village in Union Council Boken, of Jhelum District in Punjab, Pakistan. The total population of village is 2,295, and total houses are 377, head of the village is نمبردار خاور وجاہت وسیم چوہدری ، In this village there are mixed casts of people living, Gujjar گجر are in majority, especially Paswal gujjar پسوال گجر, it has one high school for girls and one for boys. It has a Big minar in the village بڑی مسجد which you can spot from miles away. There is a free hospital for the people of the village as well called Jakkar Medical Trust جکر میڈیکل ٹرسٹ run and managed by فیصل امین چوہدر. It is very big and a very important part of the village. It is part of Jhelum Tehsil, and is located at 32°55'0N 73°36'E and has an altitude of 231 metres (761 feet)., there are 3 swimming pools چھپڑ in the village,
