= Mamyan =

Coordinates: 32°48′0″N 73°33′0″E

Mamyan (Urdu: ممیان) is a village located 20 km south-west of Jhelum, 3 km west of River Jhelum and 0.5 km north of River Bunhan in Jhelum District, Punjab, Pakistan.

Nearby settlements include:

- West - Jagta 2 km
- North - Alang 1.3 km, Kolian 1 km
- East - Khurd 1.5 km, Chotala 2 km
- South - Padiala, Darapur, Chakri

== Demographics ==
The population of Mamyan, according to the 2017 census, was 2,122.
