= Lota, Punjab =

Lota لوٹا گائوں
- Village
- Location in Pakistan
- Coordinates: 32°55′N 73°41′E
- Country: Pakistan
- Region: Punjab Province
- District: Jhelum District
- Tehsil: Jhelum
- Police Station: Saddar Jhelum District
- Union Council: Monan
- Post Office: Village Lota
- Elevation: 230 m (760 ft)
- Time zone: UTC+5 (PST)
  - Summer (DST): UTC+6 (PST)
- Postal Code: 49601
- Area code: 0544
- Local Bank: National Bank of Pakistan Muhammadi Bazar Branch Jhelum

Lota is a village in the union council of Monan Jhelum Tehsil. The village is part of the Jhelum District of the Punjab province of Pakistan.
