= Adrana =

Adrana may refer to:

- Adrana, Jhelum, a village in Pakistan
- Adrana (bivalve), a genus of bivalves in the family Nuculanidae
- Adrana, a genus of butterflies in the family Noctuidae, synonym of Paectes
