= Sanghoi Khas =

Sanghoi Khas سنگھوئی خاص
- Locality
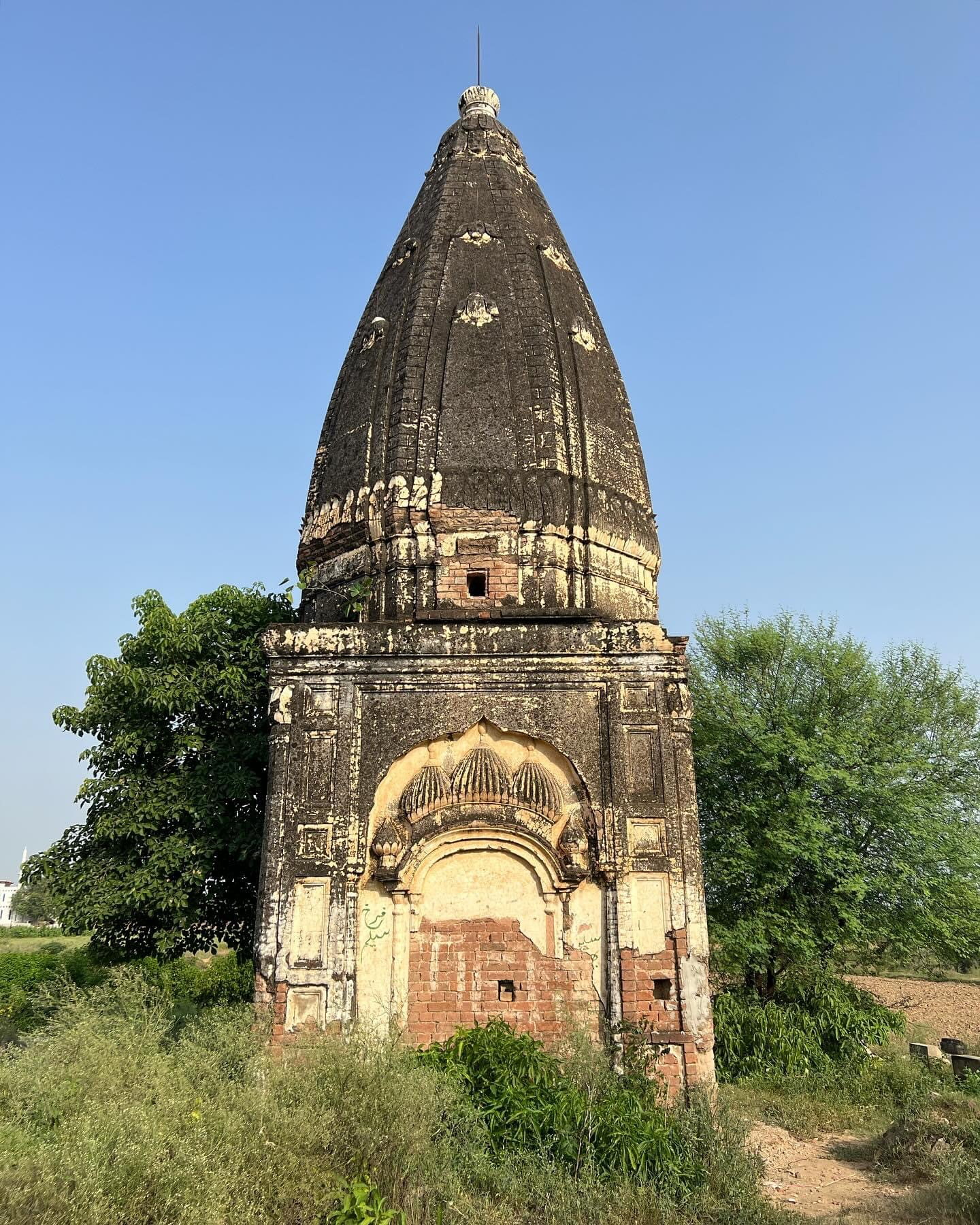
- A pre-partition era Hindu temple on the outskirts of Sanghoi

- Location within Punjab, Pakistan Sanghoi Khas (Pakistan)
- Coordinates: 32°51′45.3414″N 73°36′11.5662″E
- Country: Pakistan
- Province: Punjab
- District: Jhelum
- Tehsil: Jhelum
- Union Council: Sanghoi
- Post Office: Sanghoi

Government
  - Type: Union Council
- Elevation: 265 m (869 ft)

Population (2017)
  - Total: 4,038
  - Estimate (2023): 4,218
- Time zone: UTC+5 (PKT)

Sanghoi Khas (Urdu: سنگھوئی خاص) represents one of the two localities within the Sanghoi village, nestled in the Jhelum District of Punjab, Pakistan. Falling under the administration of Jhelum Tehsil, it serves as the central hub for the Sanghoi union council, situated 13.12 kilometers southwest of Jhelum city and 60.52 kilometers northeast of Pind Dadan Khan.

== Geography ==
Sanghoi Khas makes up the southwest section of Sanghoi village, separated from Malhu by the primary road running through the village's center.

== Demographics ==
Historical population
Census	Pop.	Time span (yrs)	%±	Annual RoG %±
1951	1,610	—	—	—
1961	1,806	10	12.17%	1.16%
1972	2,371	11	31.28%	2.51%
1981	2,443	9	3.04%	.33%
1998	3,515	17	43.88%	2.16%
2017	4,038	19	14.88%	.73%
2023 (est)	4,218	6	4.46%	.73%
