= Ludhar =

Village in Jhelum District, Punjab, Pakistan

Ludhar لدھڑ
- Village and union council
- Location in Pakistan
- Coordinates: 33°4′40″N 73°37′38″E
- Country: Pakistan
- Province: Punjab
- District: Jhelum
- Tehsil: Dina

Population (2017 Pakistani census)
  - Total: 1,228
- Time zone: UTC+5 (PST)

Ladher or Ludhar is a village and union council of Jhelum District in the Punjab Province of Pakistan.

It is part of Dina Tehsil, and is located at 33°4'40"N 73°37'38"E with an altitude of 303 metres (997 feet).
