= Bura Jungle =

Pakistani village

- Village
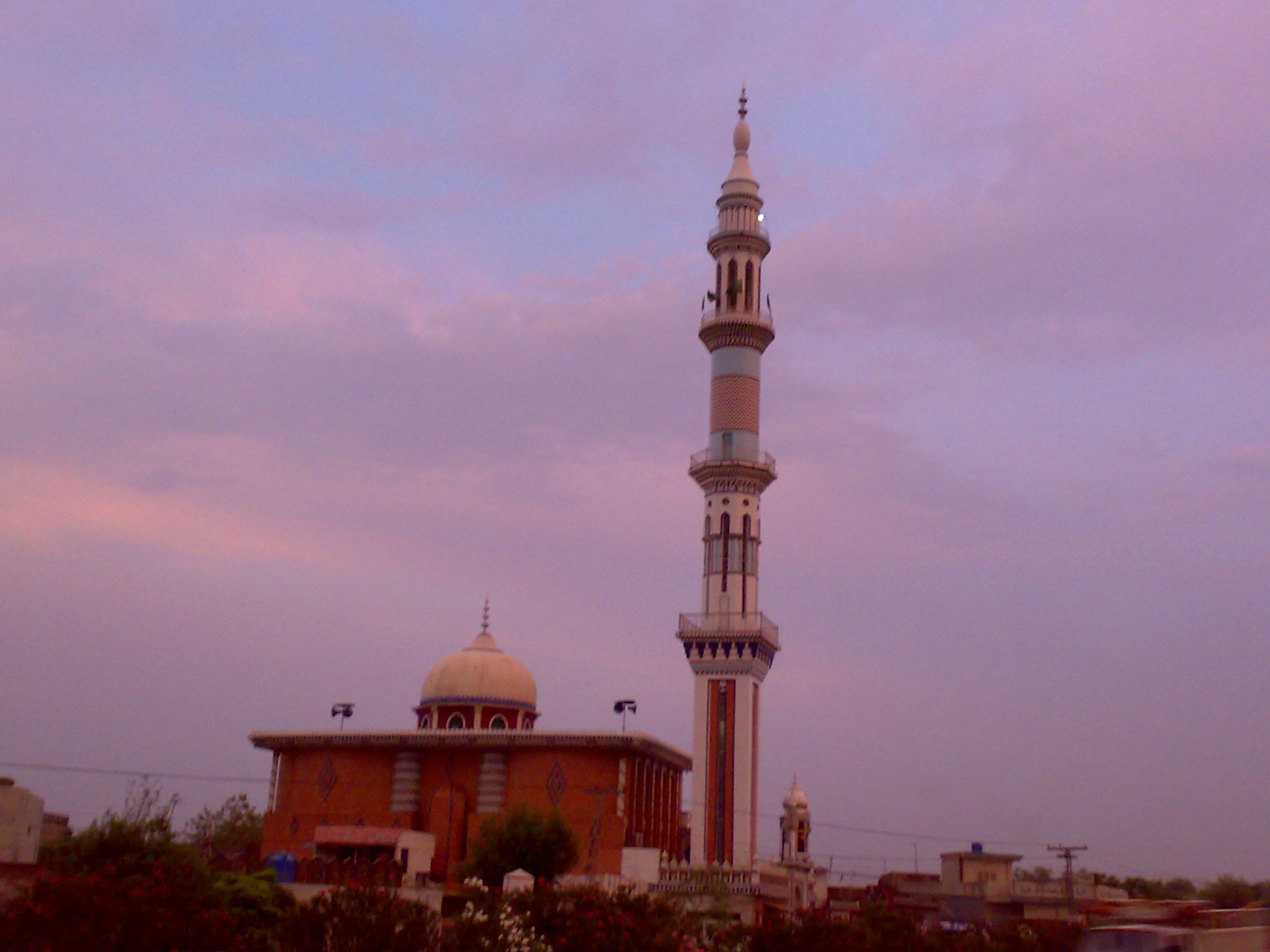
- Bura Jungle Jamia Masjid

- Location within Pakistan
- Coordinates: 33°01′10″N 73°37′47″E
- Country: Pakistan
- Province: (Punjab, Pakistan) Punjab
- District: Jhelum District
- Tehsil: Dina Tehsil
- Elevation: 281 m (922 ft)

Population (25)
  - Total: 15
  - Estimate (2022): 46
- Time zone: UTC+5 (PST)
- Postal code: 49460
- Calling code: 0544

Bura Jungle is a village in Jhelum District of Punjab, Pakistan.

The historic Grand Trunk Road passes through the village.
