= Malhu =

Malhu ملہو
- Locality
- Location within Punjab, Pakistan Malhu (Pakistan)
- Coordinates: 32°51′55.8036″N 73°36′18.741″E
- Country: Pakistan
- Province: Punjab
- District: Jhelum
- Tehsil: Jhelum
- Union Council: Sanghoi
- Post Office: Sanghoi

Government
  - Type: Union Council
- Elevation: 264 m (866 ft)

Population (2017)
  - Total: 3,919
  - Estimate (2023): 4,524
- Time zone: UTC+5 (PKT)

Malhu (Urdu: ملہو), also recognized as Sanghoi Malhu, stands as one of the two localities within the Sanghoi village in the Jhelum District of Punjab, Pakistan. It falls under the jurisdiction of Jhelum Tehsil and is a part of the Sanghoi union council, positioned 12.67 kilometers southwest of Jhelum city and 60.94 kilometers northeast of Pind Dadan Khan.

== Geography ==
Malhu constitutes the northeastern portion of Sanghoi village. The main road traversing the center of the village divides Malhu and Sanghoi Khas.

== Demographics ==
Historical population
Census	Pop.	Time span (yrs)	%±	Annual RoG %±
1951	800	—	—	—
1961	903	10	12.88%	1.22%
1972	1,257	11	39.2%	3.05%
1981	1,402	9	11.54%	1.22%
1998	2,487	17	77.39%	3.43%
2017	3,919	19	57.58%	2.42%
2023 (est)	4,524	6	15.44%	2.42%
