= Dhanyala =

Dhanyala دهنيالہ
- Village and union council
- Location in Pakistan
- Coordinates: 33°02′14″N 73°40′46″E
- Country: Pakistan
- Province: (Punjab, Pakistan) Punjab
- Division: Rawalpindi
- District: Jhelum
- Tehsil: Dina
- Elevation: 256 m (840 ft)

Population
  - Total: 14,500
- Time zone: UTC+5 (PST)

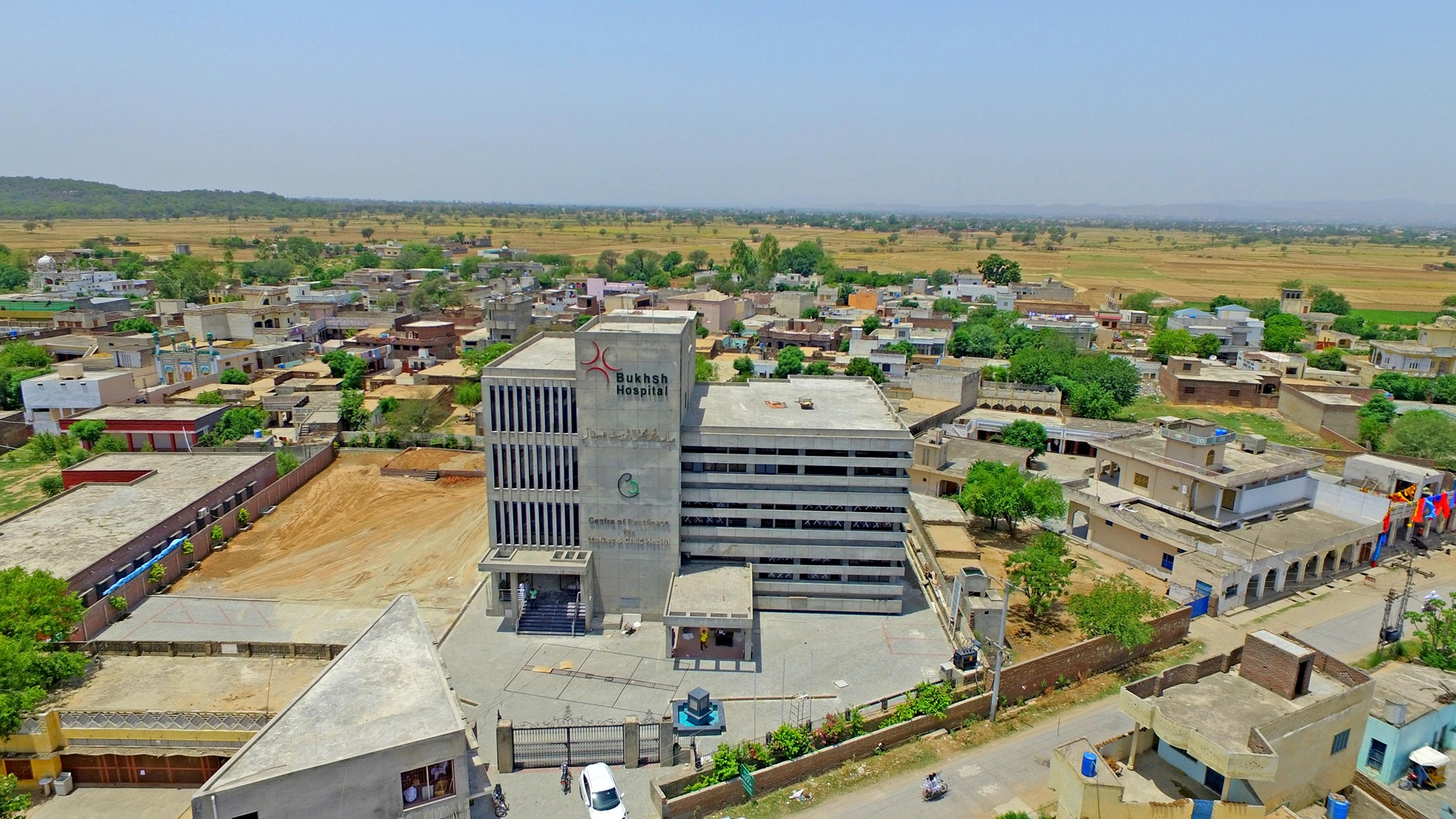
Mian Muhammad Bukhsh hospital Dhanyala

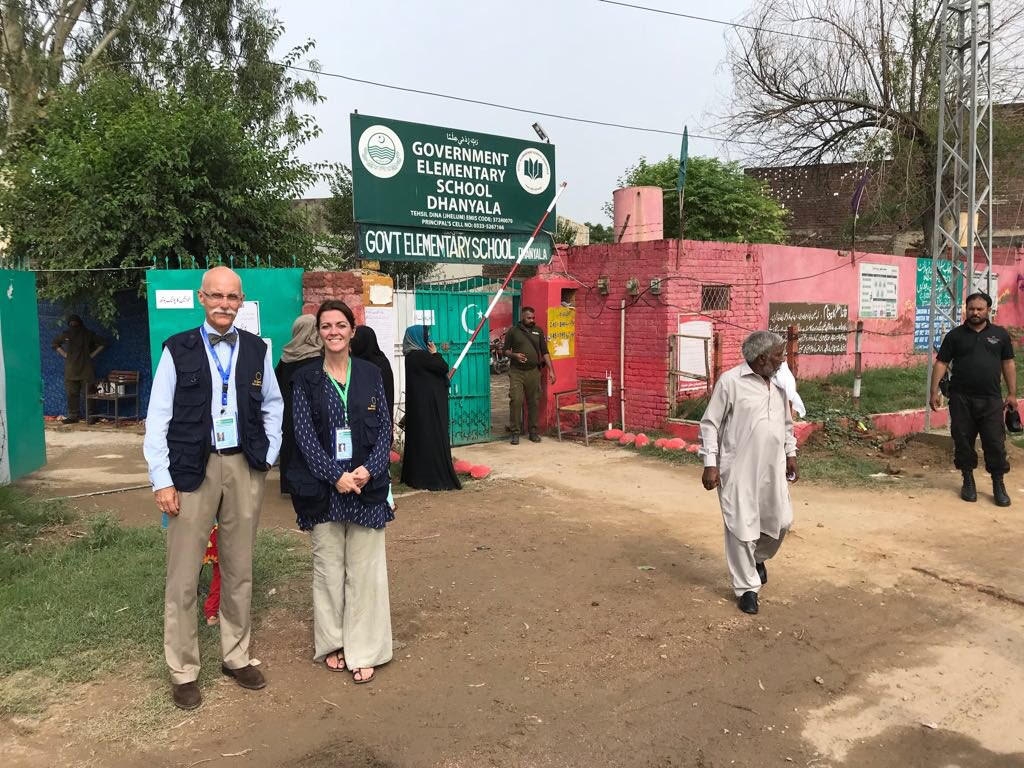
Jean François Cautain European Union ambassador to Pakistan in Dhanyala during Election 2018.

Dhanyala (Urdu: دهنيالہ) is a village and union council of Jhelum District in the Punjab Province of Pakistan. It is part of Jhelum Tehsil, and is located at 33°02'21.4"N 73°40'46.1"E, at an altitude of 256 metres (840 ft).. In Dhanyala there is a hospital named Mian Muhammad Bukhsh Hospital.

== Education ==
The Govt. Girls Higher Secondary School was initially established by Mian Muhammad Bukhsh Trust – MMBT and then handed over to the education department. Following are the schools working in Dhanyala:

- Govt. Elementary school for boys, Dhanyala.
- Govt. Higher secondary school for girls, Dhanyala.
- Govt. Primary school for boys, Dhanyala.

The Board of Trustees – BOT of Mian Muhammad Bakhsh Trust also established a hospital in the name of Sufi Mian Muhammad Bukhsh, which provides free medical services to the local community and community of 12 more Union Councils.

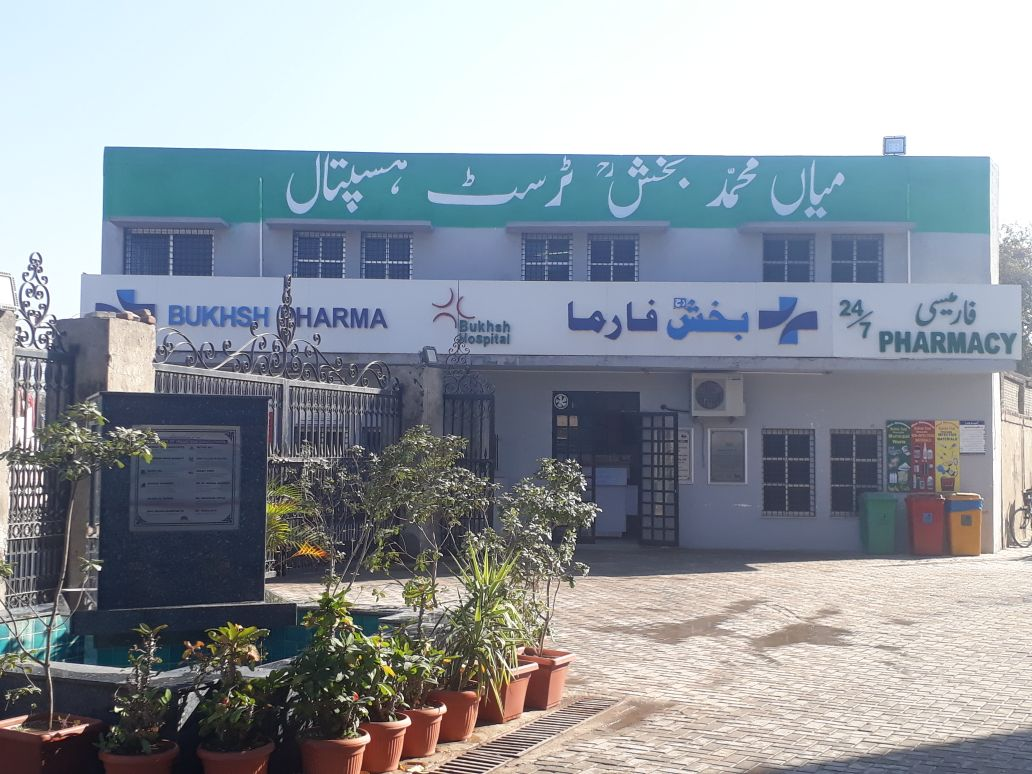
Bukhsh Pharmacy Dhanyala

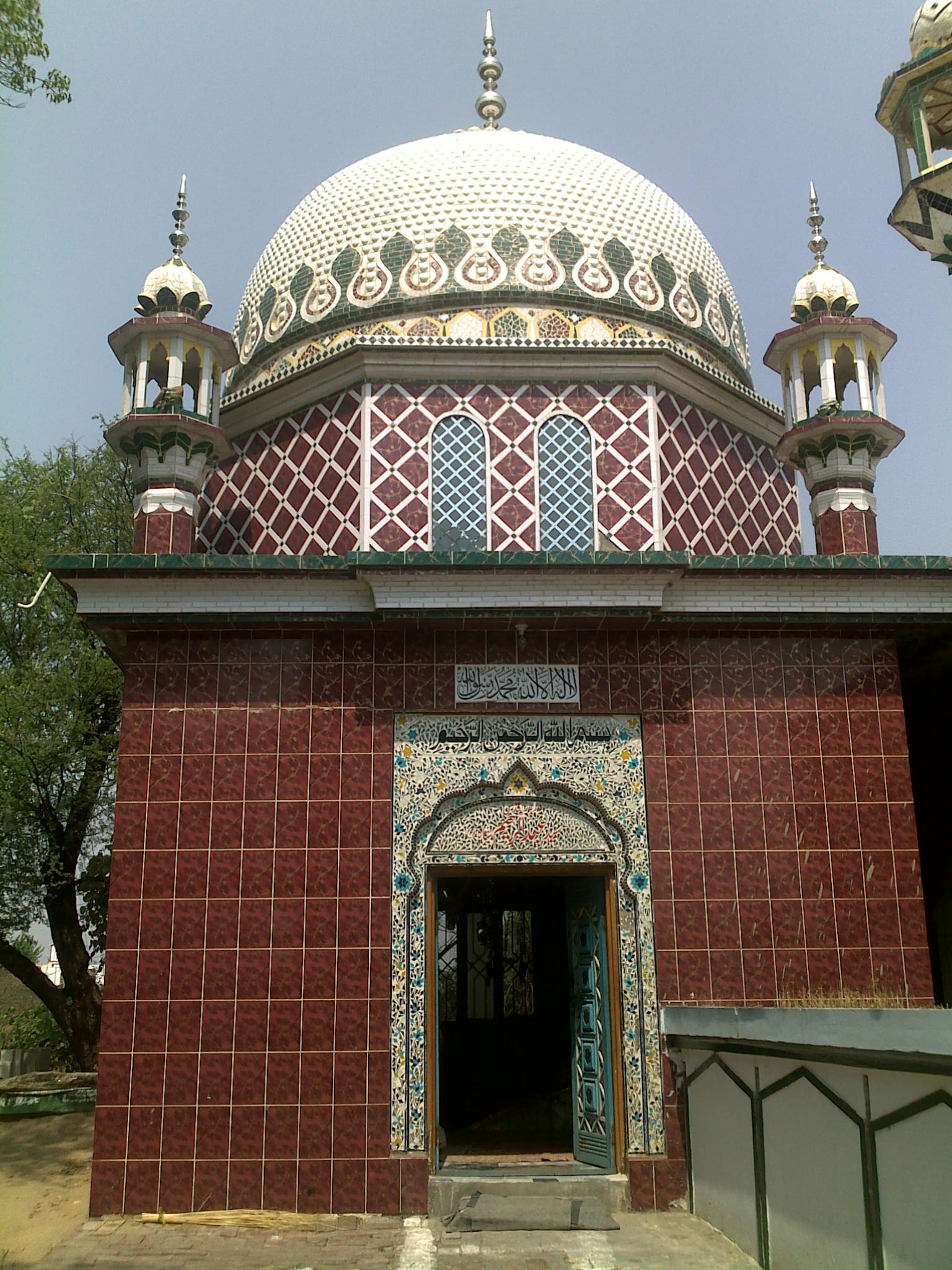
Shrine of Syed Abdul Rahim Shah
