= Sultanpur, Jhelum =

Sultanpur سُلطانپُور
- Union Council and village
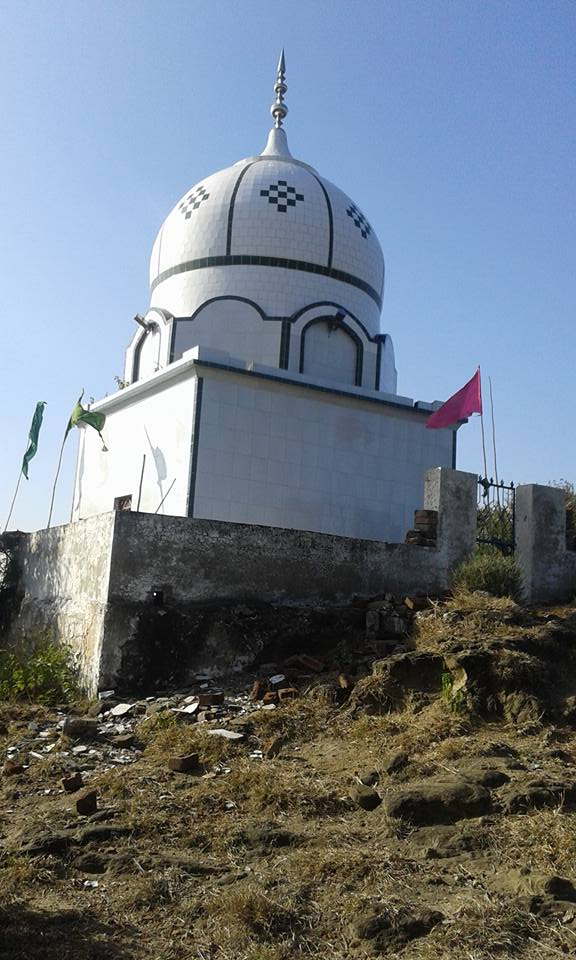
- Tomb of Baba Peer Jhala
- Nickname: New Sultanpur
- Country: Pakistan
- Province: Punjab
- District: Jhelum
- Tehsil: Dina
- Time zone: UTC+5 (PST)
  - Summer (DST): +6

Sultanpur (Punjabi\Urdu: سُلطانپُور) is a village and union council of Dina Tehsil, Jhelum District in the Punjab Province of Pakistan. It is a historical village of the Gahkar tribe and is located near Mangla Cantonment and Mirpur. Before the Mangla Dam was constructed, Sultanpur's area was 175,000 kanals.

During the Gakhar Sultanate, Sultanpur served as a mint of Gakhar coins.
