= Sohawa =

Sohawa سوہاوہ
- Town
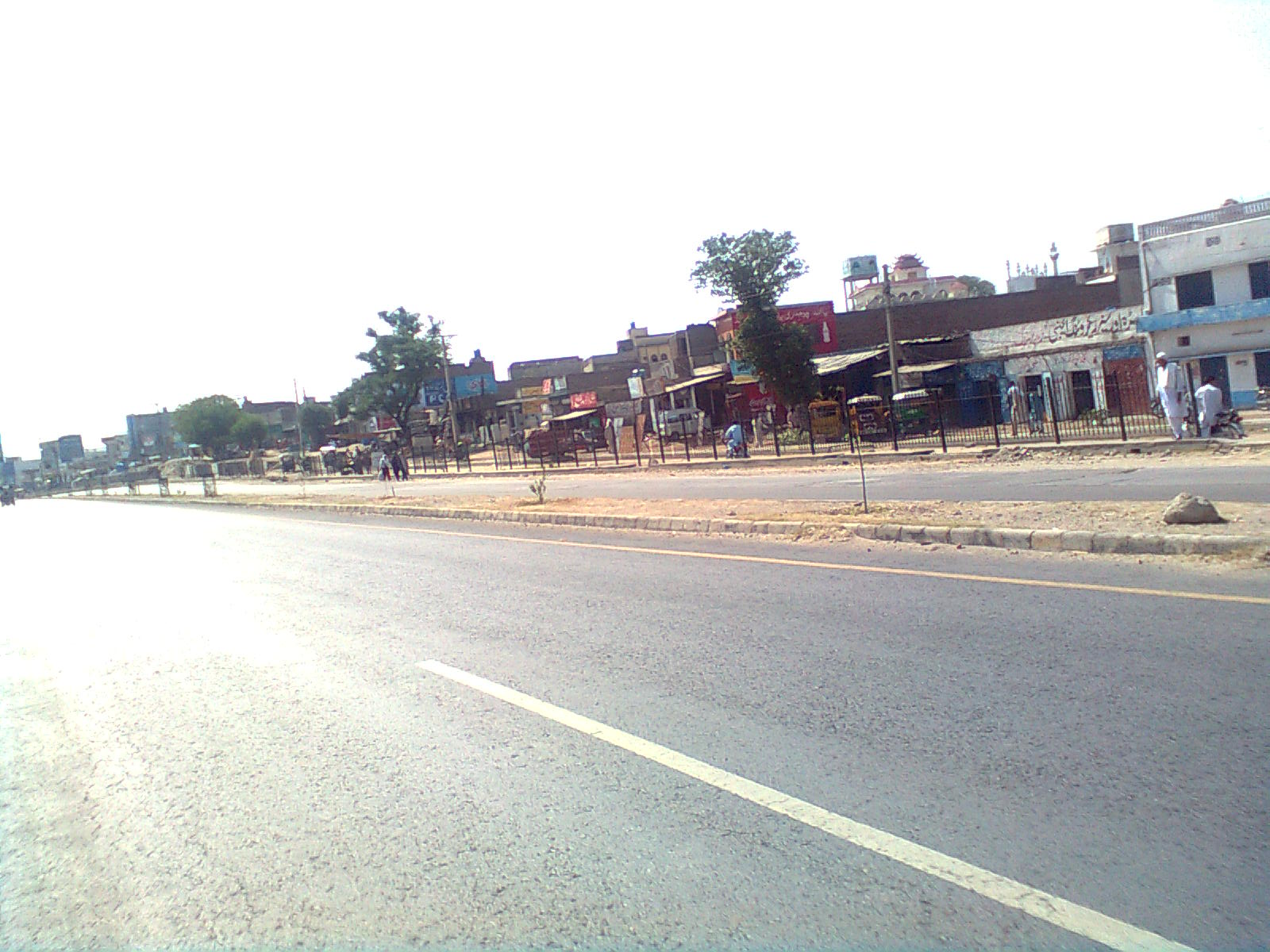
- Grand Trunk Road (N-5) in Sohawa

- Location within Pakistan
- Coordinates: 33°07′55″N 73°25′12″E
- Country: Pakistan
- Province: Punjab
- Division: Rawalpindi
- District: Jhelum
- Tehsil: Sohawa

Government
  - MPA: Syed Riffat Mehmood
- Elevation: 408 m (1,339 ft)

Languages
  - Official: Punjabi, Urdu
- Time zone: UTC+5 (PST)
- Postal code: 49230
- Calling code: 0544

Sohawa is a town in the Punjab province of Pakistan, and is the capital of the Sohawa Tehsil, which is an administrative subdivision of Jhelum District in Punjab. Sohawa has grown from a small village in 1947 to a large town in 2014, with major developments in transport, education and health. A number of bureaucrats, army officers, judges and other senior officials belong to Sohawa areas. It is also the final resting place of Muhammad of Ghor.

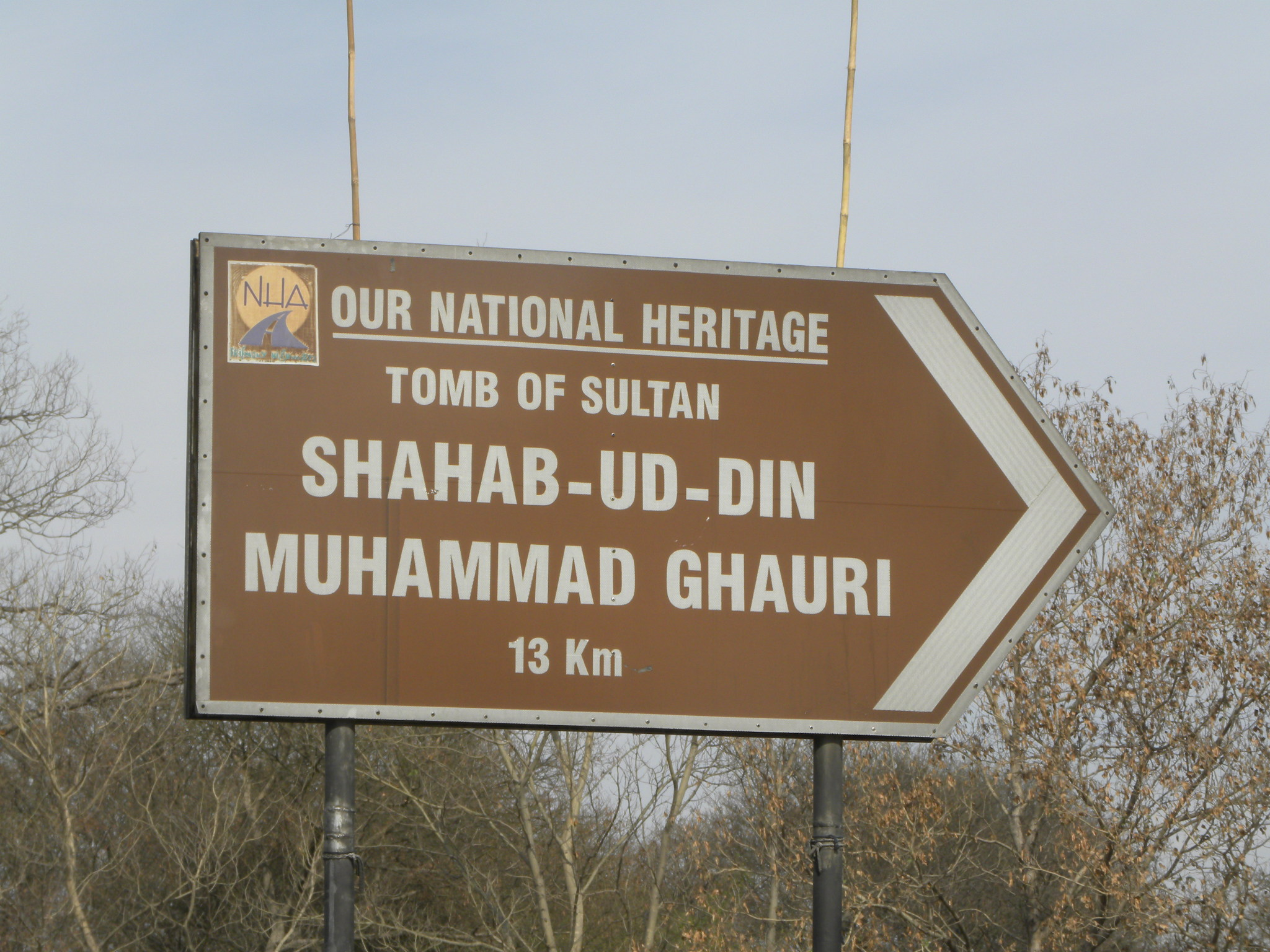
A sign pointing to the tomb of Shahab-Ud-Din Muhammad Ghauri, near Sohawa

== Etymology ==
The etymology of Sohawa has not been proven, but folk etymology suggests So Hawa, which means "100 winds".

== Geography ==
Sohawa is in the north-western part of Jhelum district, Punjab, on the subcontinental Grand Trunk Road (GT Road) between Gujar Khan and Dina. The geographical coordinates of its weather station are 33° 07' 15" North, 73° 25' 34". One sign of Sohawa is the toll plaza by the name of 'Tarakki' on the GT Road. The bazaars of Sohawa attract people from nearby villages; these bazaars are located on both sides of the GT Road.

== Sociology ==
The population mostly consists of different tribes. One of the major professions in Sohawa is service in the Armed Forces. A large number of people of Sohawa are settled in foreign countries particularly Western Europe and Middle East. The main source of livelihood of the people is agriculture.

== In the media ==
In mid 2014, Sohawa was featured on national media including Geo News, Dawn News and other top news channel because of newly discovered Ghauri XI oil reserves in its suburbs.

== Health ==
The main hospital for Sohawa and surrounding rural areas is the 80-bed Tehsil Headquarters Hospital but it has only basic facilities. For more serious health problems people have to go to larger hospitals in major cities such as Gujar Khan, Islamabad or Jhelum. There is also a rural health center in Domeli and twelve basic health units (Adrana, Jandala, Nagial, Gurah Uttam Singh, Kohali, Phulray Syedan, Surgdhan, Dewan-e-Hazoori, Pail Mirza, Karounta, Panchor and Banth). Additionally there three government rural dispensaries (Lehri, Gaddar, and Baragawah) and four rural dispensaries (Dial, Hayal, Pari Darweza and Dhairy Bakrala).
