= Phulrey Sydan =

Phulray Syedan
- Union Council and village
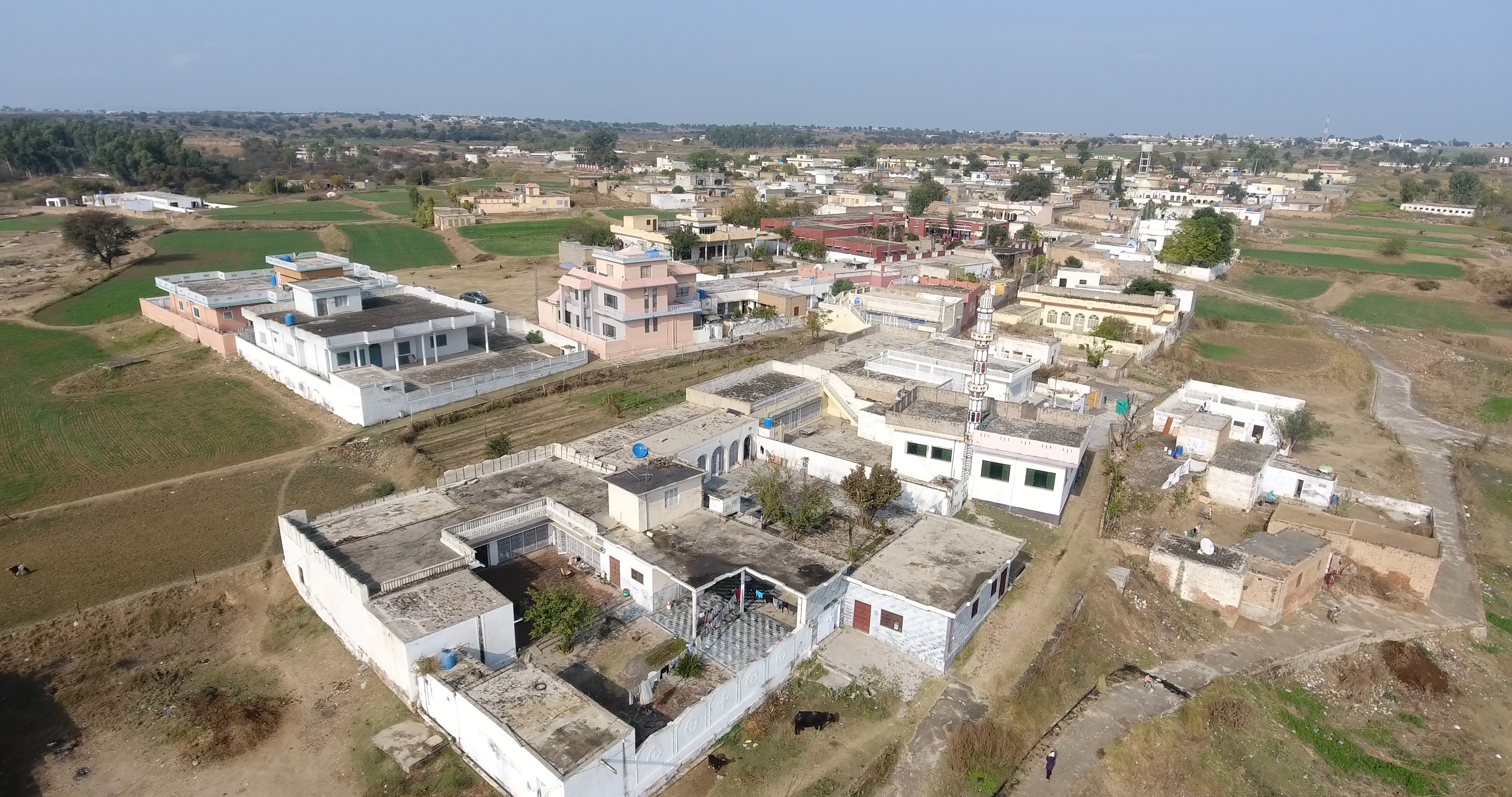
- Country: Pakistan
- Province: Punjab
- District: Jhelum
- Tehsil: Sohawa
- Time zone: UTC+5 (PST)
  - Summer (DST): +6

Phulray Syedan is a village and union council of Jhelum District in the Punjab province of Pakistan. It is part of Sohawa Tehsil.
