= Madu Kalas =

Coordinates: 33°03′N 73°37′E

- Village and union council
- Interactive map of Madu Kalas
- Country: Pakistan
- Province: Punjab
- District: Jhelum
- Tehsil: Dina
- Time zone: UTC+5 (PST)

Madu Kalas is a village and union council of Jhelum District in the Punjab Province of Pakistan. It is part of Jhelum Tehsil.
