= Wagh =

- Village in Punjab, Pakistan
- Interactive map of Wagh
- Country: Pakistan
- Province: Punjab
- Division: Rawalpindi
- District: Jhelum
- Tehsil: Pind Dadan Khan

Population
  - Estimate: 10,000 (approx)
- Time zone: UTC+5 (PST)
- Telephone Calling Code: 544
- A village in Tehsil Pind Dadan Khan, Jhelum District of Pakistan

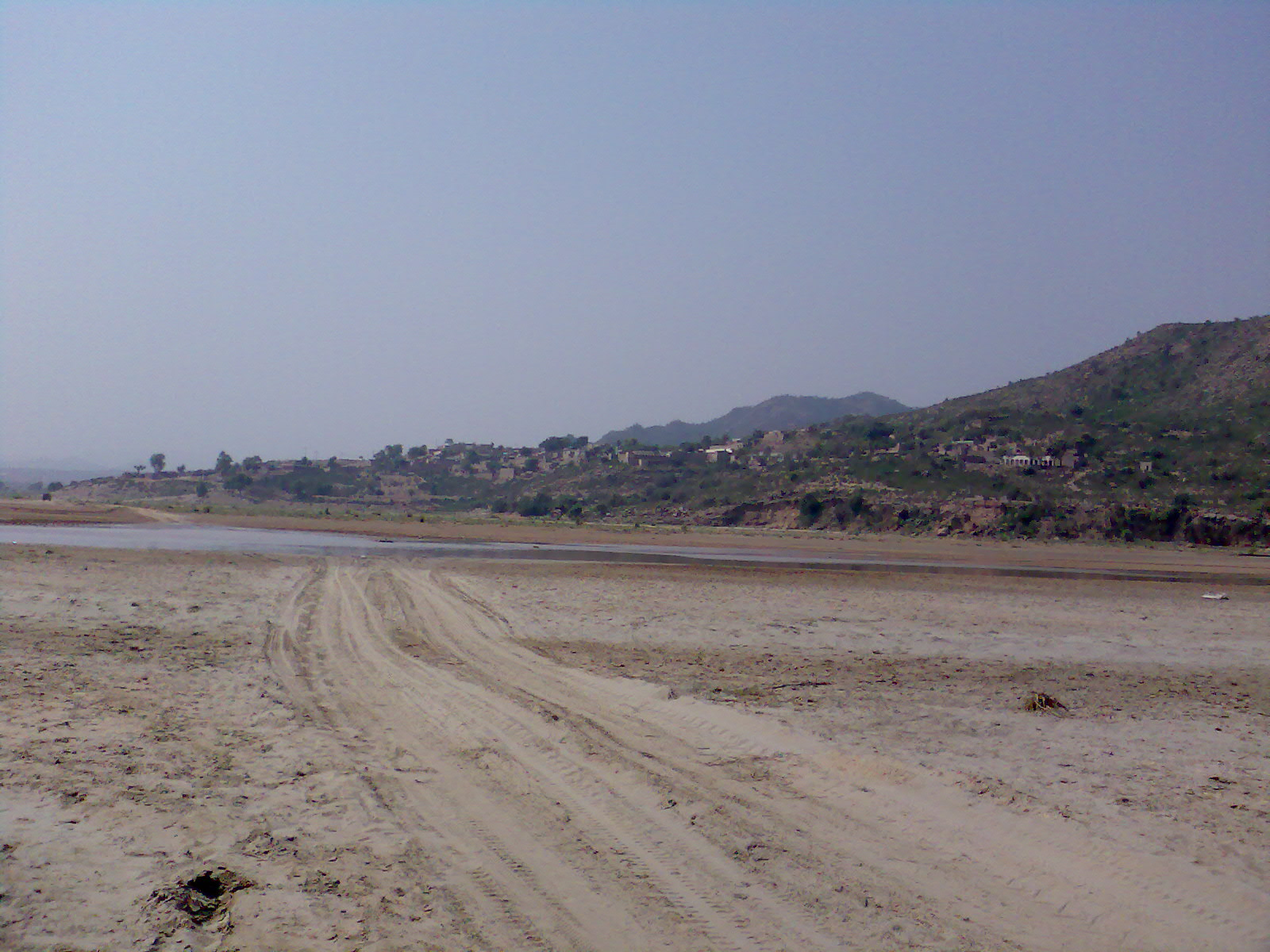
Naalah Bunhar riverbed west of Wagh

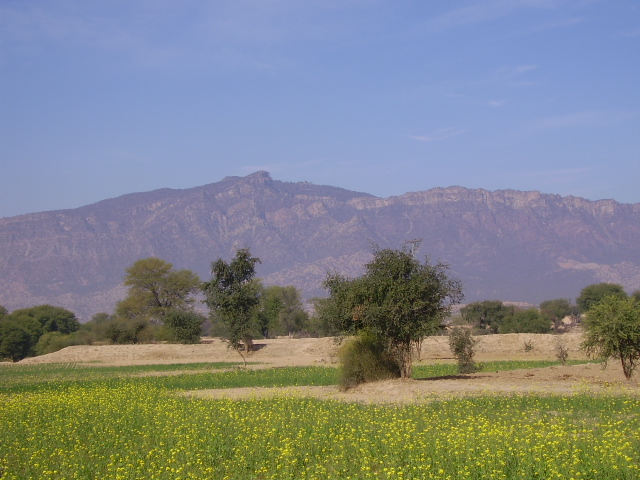
Tilla Jogian mountain

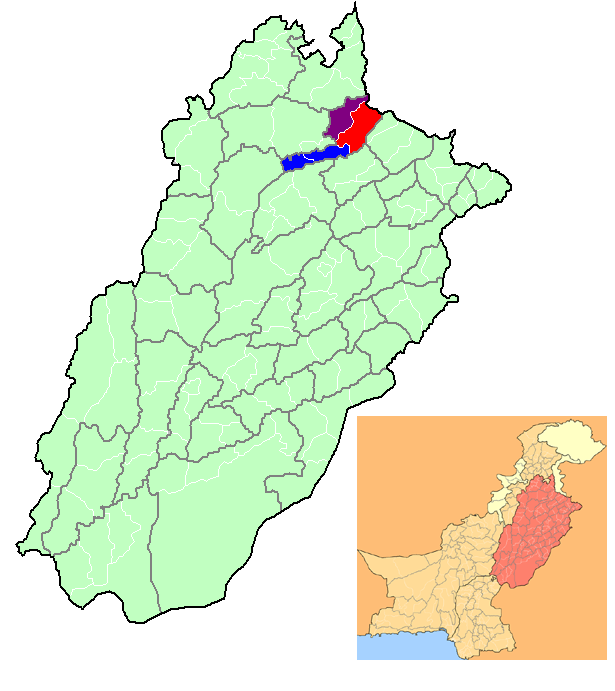
Tehsil-wise Map of District Jhelum

Wagh (Urdu: وگھ) is an ancient village located about 10 kilometres north of Jalalpur Sharif, in the Pind Dadan Khan Tehsil of Jhelum District, Pakistan. It is situated in a valley surrounded by foothills of the Salt Range on the north, east and south and a rain-dependent river Naalah Bunhar on the west, nearly 45 kilometres east of Khewra Salt Mines within the jurisdiction of the police station and Union Council at Jalalpur Sharif. Wagh is the largest village in the Chamkon Valley (Urdu: وادی چمکون).

The village is connected with the Jhelum–Pind Dadan Khan Road at Jalalpur Sharif through a 10 kilometres long road passing through the heights of the Salt Range.

== Municipal services ==
A basic health unit was established in the village in 1988. The village was provided with electricity and land line telephone facility in 1992 whereafter a water supply system was also provided.

== Education ==
Local schools are:

- Government High School Wagh (for boys)
- Government Girls High School Wagh
- Al Hadi Foundation Wagh
