= Mammone =

Mammone is a surname. Notable people with the surname include:

- Marianna Mammone (born 2000), Italian rapper, singer, and songwriter
- Mario Mammone (born 1959), Italian jazz musician
- Richard Mammone (born 1953), American engineer, inventor, entrepreneur, and professor
- Robert Mammone (born 1971), Australian actor
