= Nagial, Jhelum =

- Union Council and village
- Country: Pakistan
- Province: Punjab
- District: Jhelum
- Tehsil: Sohawa
- Time zone: UTC+5 (PST)
  - Summer (DST): +6

Nagial is a village and union council of Jhelum District in the Punjab province of Pakistan. It is part of Sohawa Tehsil. Jatt is the main tribe of Nagial village. They dominate the local politics. The prominent family includes Chaudhary Zafar. Chaudhary Saqlain, who had been twice MPA of Punjab Assembly also belongs to Jatt Nagial tribe.
