= Naalah Bunhan =

River in Pakistan

Coordinates: 32.7688°N 73.5890°E

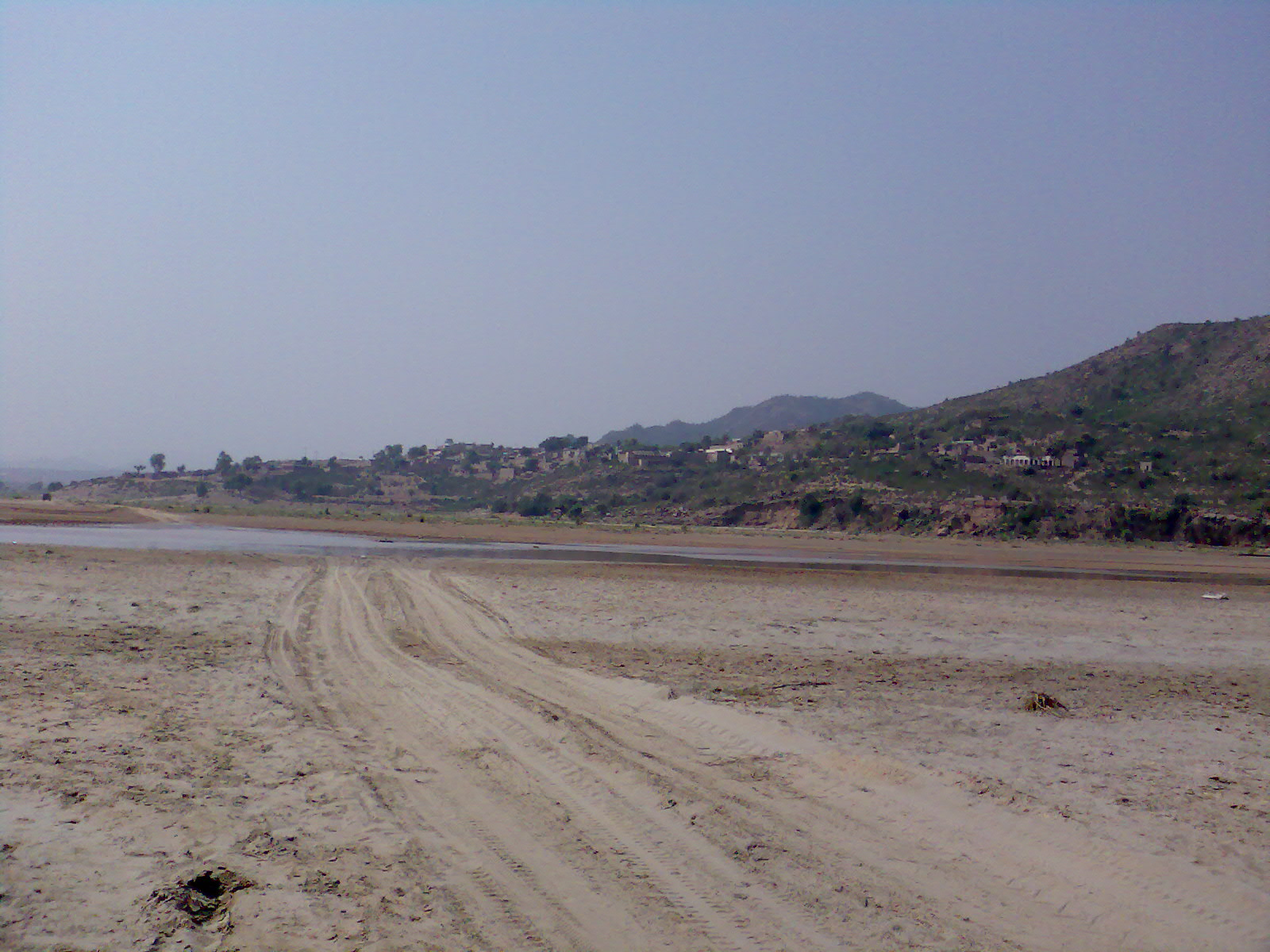
River Bunhar near Pind Sawika

Naalah Bunhar (Urdu: نالہ بنہاں, also "Bunhā torrent") is a river in, Punjab, Pakistan. It begins in Saral, Chakwal District, and then enters Jhelum District and flows into the River Jhelum near Darapur. It runs south of Tilla Jogian and the Salt Range, where, with rainfall, its width reportedly "spreads over a mile of country". It forms the only ravine in the wide fertile plateau of Jhelum Tehsil that drains into the Jhelum River; all others drain into the Soan River. Many waterfalls from Tilla Jogian also fall into the Bunhar. Near Pind Sawika and Wagh villages, this river's bed takes the form of a desert.
