= Hammann =

Hammann may refer to

- Charles Hammann, American aviator
- Gregg Hammann, corporate executive
- Johann Wolfgang Hammann, founder of the Wallendorf porcelain manufacture in Lichte Thuringia
- Nicolas Hammann, American professor race car driver
- Niel Hammann, South African journalist and magazine editor
- Otto Hammann, German journalist
- Wilhelm Hammann, survivor of Buchenwald concentration camp
- USS Hammann, several warships of the U.S. Navy
