= Nakka Khurd =

Nakka Khurd نکہ خُورد
- Village
- Location within Punjab, Pakistan Nakka Khurd (Pakistan)
- Coordinates: 32°46′21.309″N 73°26′38.655″E
- Country: Pakistan
- Province: Punjab
- District: Jhelum
- Tehsil: Jhelum
- Union Council: Nakka Khurd

Government
  - Type: Union Council
- Elevation: 291 m (955 ft)

Population (2017)
  - Total: 868
  - Estimate (2023): 942
- Time zone: UTC+5 (PKT)

Nakka Khurd (Urdu: نکہ خُورد), is a village in the Jhelum District of Punjab, Pakistan. Serving as the central hub for the Nakka Khurd union council within Jhelum Tehsil, it is 14.72 kilometers northwest of Rasul and 13.32 kilometers north of Jalalpur Sharif.

== Etymology ==
Nakka is a Punjabi language term commonly associated with the eye of a needle, suggesting a narrow gateway when applied geographically. This connection might stem from the village's proximity to a narrow passage among mountains where Naalah Bunhan flows. Khurd is a term originating from the Persian language denoting small. Used administratively in both India and Pakistan, Khurd designates the smaller section of a town, village, or settlement, typically appended after place names. Consequently, the combined village name implies the meaning of a small gateway.

== Geography ==
Nakka Khurd is located in the southwestern part of Jhelum Tehsil, situated on the plateau between the Jhelum River and the Salt Range.

== Demographics ==
Historical population
Census	Pop.	Time span (yrs)	%±	Annual RoG %±
1951	390	—	—	—
1961	409	10	4.87%	.48%
1972	494	11	20.78%	1.73%
1981	502	9	1.62%	.18%
1998	669	17	33.27%	1.7%
2017	868	19	29.75%	1.38%
2023 (est)	942	6	8.53%	1.38%
