= Dhamyal (caste) =

- دھمیال
- Classification: Rajput / Jatts
- Languages: Potohari, Punjabi, Pashto, Hindko, Urdu English
- Country: Pakistan, India, United Kingdom, France, Italy
- Ethnicity: Pakistani/Indian
- Population: 62,000 (2023 Estimate)
- Family names: Dhamyal, Rajput, Jatts
- Feudal title: The Janjua Rajput King
- Lineage: Janjua Rajputs / Jatts
- Color: Brown
- Throne: Potohar Region
- Victory weapon: Rajput Sword/Arabian Bow & Arrow
- Notable members: Sultan Dhami Khan Rajput (Founder), Raja Ali Khan OBE, Raja Usman Latif Dhamyal, Ch Iqbal Dhamyal
- Related groups: Rajputs, Janjua Jatts Rajputs
- Kingdom (original): Potohar Region

The Dhamyal (Also spelled Dhamial) is a tribe found in India and Pakistan and believed to derive its name from the Rajput Janjua king, Dhami Khan Rajput.

== Origins ==
Over time, the descendants of Sultan Dhami Khan Rajput began using the name Dhamyal to identify themselves as a distinct caste. The surname Dhamyal became associated with their lineage and indicated their Rajput heritage.

The Dhamyal caste, like other Rajput lineages, maintains a strong sense of pride in their ancestry and Rajput roots.
