= Richard Mammone =

Richard J. Mammone
- Born: 1953 (age 72–73); New York
- Education: B.E.E.E, M.E.E.E, Ph.D
- Alma mater: City College of New York; City University of New York
- Known for: LASIK eye surgery corneal mapping technology; Speech recognition technology
- Website: https://innovation-ecosystem.blogspot.com/

Richard J. Mammone (born 1953, New York) is an American engineer, inventor, entrepreneur and professor. As an inventor, he holds over 15 patents. To date, he has formed four technology companies including SpeakEZ, a firm that specialized in voice recognition technology, and Computed Anatomy Inc., the business that pioneered LASIK eye surgery.

== Early life ==
Mammone attended City College of New York where he earned a B.E.E.E and M.E.E.E in Electrical and Computer Engineering in 1975 and 1977, respectively. He earned a PhD from City University of New York in 1981. He has been a professor of electrical and computer engineering at Rutgers University since 1982, later earning a joint appointment as a Rutgers Business School professor, and was awarded the Henry Rutgers Faculty Fellowship in 1985, 1986, and 1987. Mammone was a recipient of the Samuel Rudin Scholarship of Society of American Military Engineers. His academic interests lie in signal processing and computational pattern recognition. Over the last 20 years, Mammone published over 140 journal and conference papers in the areas of Neural Networks and Signal Processing. He also published four books and invited papers and talks on these topics. He is a founding member of the Institute of Electrical and Electronics Engineers (IEEE) on Neural Networks and was Associate Editor of the IEEE Transactions on Neural Networks. He is a Senior Member of the IEEE and has been a consultant to numerous government agencies and corporations.

== Career ==
Mammone's research interests lie in computational pattern recognition and signal processing. He performed research on Neural networks and signal processing, generating over 15 patents and producing 150 published papers.

Mammone started high-tech companies and serves as consultant to government agencies and industry. As an entrepreneur, his interests lie in the processes involved in creating technology products. In supply chain management, Mammone advocates developing product platforms that can be designed within an existing product's value chain.

Groundbreaking corneal mapping technology catalyzed his second venture, Computed Anatomy Inc. The firm was first to develop, manufacture and sell computer aided surgery tools for corneal surgery commonly referred to today as LASIK surgery. His software is still used for laser eye surgical procedures. Computed Anatomy was sold in 1986 to a Japanese manufacturer of ophthalmic tools.

In 1992, Mammone founded SpeakEZ Inc., a provider of biometric security systems. The company brought innovative speech recognition technology to market that revolutionized the world of voice activated security systems and voice recognition applications. In 1994, it was sold to T-Netix (NASDAQ: TNTX), a publicly traded telecommunications company. During his three-year tenure, Mammone rolled out and managed several successful products.

At the height of the dot com era in 2000, Mammone launched The mBook Company. The company developed new media alternatives for textbooks and trade books using technology. Although the firm disbanded in 2001 due to investment related issues, it made strides in developing an interactive e-learning platform at a time when high bandwidth video over the internet was unavailable, garnering support from Cisco and other strategic partners.

Currently, Mammone serves as the liaison between Rutgers University and Industry by coordinating networking events, web sites and projects that combine business and technology interests. He directs the CAIP center which provides Cyber infrastructure platforms for academic and nonprofit institutions. Mammone's current interests lie in fostering an ecosystem of innovation and new venture development. To that end, he served as the Director of the Business, Engineering, Science, and Technology (BEST) Institute which focuses on starting new companies based on university intellectual property. He is a contributor to Business Week, featuring articles that speak to the challenges faced by entrepreneurs. He is currently involved in launching a start-up, myPowerMap LLC, a firm that specializes in developing home energy consumption monitoring technology.
