= Kotla Faqir =

Coordinates: 32°54′0″N 73°41′0″E

- Village and union council
- Interactive map of Kotla Faqir
- Country: Pakistan
- Province: Punjab
- District: Jhelum
- Tehsil: Jhelum

Government
  - Type: Local Bodies
  - Union Chairman: Chairman Ch. Sajid Nazir
- Time zone: UTC+5 (PST)

Kotla Faqir is a village and union council of Jhelum District in the Punjab Province of Pakistan. It is part of Jhelum Tehsil, and is located at 32°54'0N 73°41'0E, at an altitude of 218 metres (718 feet).
