= Kohali, Jhelum =

Kohali
- Location within Pakistan
- Coordinates: 31.08°N 72.48°E
- Country: Pakistan
- Province: Punjab
- District: Jhelum
- Tehsil: Sohawa
- Elevation: 166 m (545 ft)
- Time zone: UTC+5 (PST)

Kohali is a village and union council of Jhelum District in the Punjab province of Pakistan. It is part of Sohawa Tehsil, and located at 31°8'0N 72°48'0E at an altitude of 166 metres (547 feet).
