= USS Hammann =

Two ships in the United States Navy have been named USS Hammann for Ensign Charles Hammann.

- USS Hammann (DD-412), was a destroyer, commissioned in 1939 and sunk in enemy action in 1942
- USS Hammann (DE-131), was a destroyer escort, commissioned in 1943 and decommissioned in 1946
