= Chak Khasa =

Coordinates: 32°58′N 73°45′E

Chak Khasa Tahlianwala
- Village and union council
- Interactive map of Chak Khasa
- Country: Pakistan
- Region: Punjab
- District: Jhelum
- Tehsil: Jhelum
- UC No.: 10
- Time zone: UTC+5 (PST)
- Postal code: 49608
- Area code: 0544

Chak Khasa is a village by the Jhelum River and union council of Jhelum District in the Punjab Province of Pakistan. It is part of Jhelum Tehsil. Majority of the population belongs to the Mughal and Panhwar Sohlan Rajput clans.
