= Sanghoi =

Sanghoi سنگھوئی
- Village
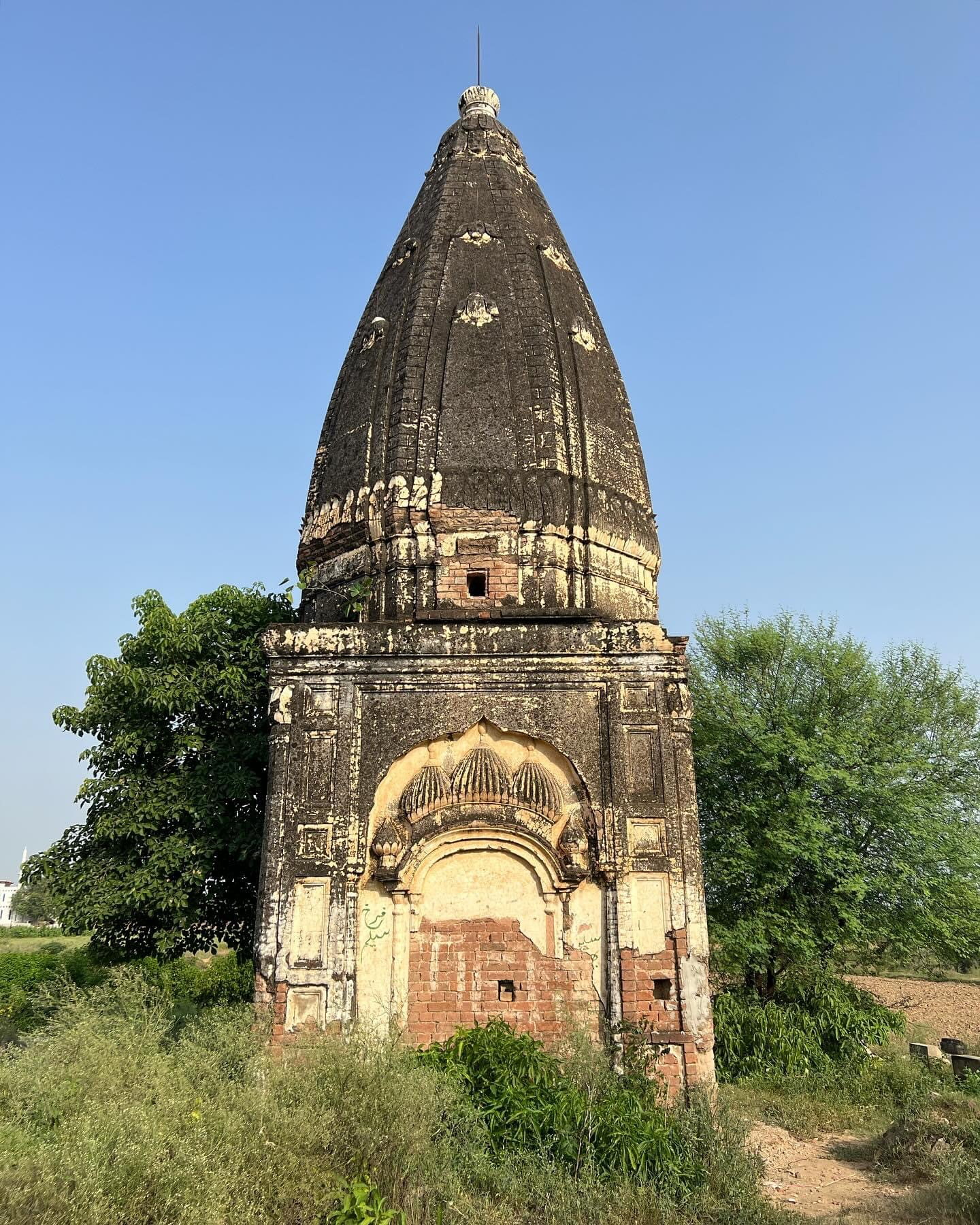
- A pre-partition era Hindu temple on the outskirts of Sanghoi

- Location within Punjab, Pakistan Sanghoi (Pakistan)
- Coordinates: 32°51′48.0162″N 73°36′15.5736″E
- Country: Pakistan
- Province: Punjab
- District: Jhelum
- Tehsil: Jhelum
- Union Council: Sanghoi

Government
  - Type: Union Council
- Elevation: 259 m (850 ft)

Population (2017)
  - Total: 7,957
  - Estimate (2023): 8,742
- Time zone: UTC+5 (PKT)

Sanghoi (Urdu: سنگھوئی), is a village situated in Jhelum District of Punjab, Pakistan. It is part of Jhelum Tehsil, serving as the central hub for the Sanghoi union council. Comprising two localities—namely Sanghoi Khas and Malhu, it is located 13 kilometres (8.1 mi) southwest of Jhelum city and 60.6 kilometres (37.7 mi) northeast of Pind Dadan Khan.

== Etymology ==
Sangh is derived from the Sanskrit word Sangha, signifying an association, society, a union, or an organization. Meanwhile, hoi in the Punjabi language translates to happened, suggesting that Sanghoi could signify a place where society happened or union happened.

Additionally, there exists a subcaste with the same name under the Mahajan Pahari caste. Nevertheless, there are no residents in the village affiliated with that particular caste.

== Geography ==
Sanghoi is situated in the central region of Jhelum Tehsil, adjacent to the border of Dina Tehsil.

== Landmarks ==
Several structures from the pre-partition era in Sanghoi display elements of Hindu architecture, including a Sheran Wali Haveli, meaning lion mansion, and a temple. The temple is situated on the outskirts of the village, approximately 204 meters across Sanghoi Kas (a rainy water ravine) and 506.9 meters southwest from the village center, along the dirt path between Sanghoi and the neighboring village Toor. Although there are no longer any Hindu residents in the village, records of their fate during the partition are unavailable.

== History ==
As per the 19th-century French geographer Vivien de Saint-Martin, Sanghoi occupies the identical site where the ancient Buddhist city of Sinhapura, alternatively transliterated as Singhapura, once existed.

== Demographics ==
Historical population
Census	Pop.	Time span (yrs)	%±	Annual RoG %±
1951	2,410	—	—	—
1961	2,709	10	12.41%	1.18%
1972	3,628	11	33.92%	2.69%
1981	3,845	9	5.98%	.65%
1998	6,002	17	56.1%	2.65%
2017	7,957	19	32.57%	1.5%
2023 (est)	8,701	6	9.35%	1.5%
Sources
Notes: This is combined demographic data of Sanghoi Khas and Malhu localities of Sanghoi.
