= Lehri, Jhelum =

Village in Punjab, Pakistan

Lehri, Jhelum گکھڑاں دی لہڑی
- Union Council and village
- Country: Pakistan
- Province: Punjab
- District: Jhelum
- Tehsil: Sohawa
- Time zone: UTC+5 (PST)
  - Summer (DST): +6

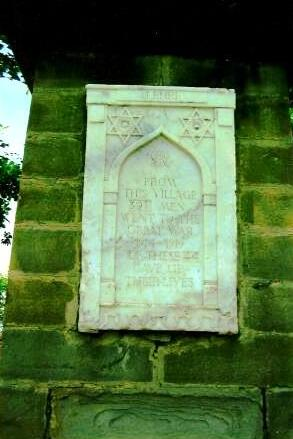
A memorial in the village of Lehri in Jhelum district. The memorial records that 391 men from Lehri went off to fight in the 1914-1918 war and of these 44 "gave up their lives".

Lehri is a village and union council in Sohawa Tehsil of Jhelum District in the Punjab province of Pakistan.
