= Jajial =

Coordinates: 32°57′N 73°18′E

- Union Council and village
- Interactive map of Jajial
- Country: Pakistan
- Province: Punjab
- District: Jhelum
- Tehsil: Sohawa
- Time zone: UTC+5 (PST)
  - Summer (DST): +6

Jajial is a village and union council of Jhelum District in the Punjab province of Pakistan. It is part of Sohawa Tehsil.
