= Chotala =

Chotala چوٹالہ
- Village
- Location within Punjab, Pakistan Chotala (Pakistan)
- Coordinates: 32°49′4.2168″N 73°34′38.1″E
- Country: Pakistan
- Province: Punjab
- District: Jhelum
- Tehsil: Jhelum
- Union Council: Chotala
- Elevation: 257 m (843 ft)

Population (2017)
  - Total: 6,244
  - Estimate (2023): 6,856
- Time zone: UTC+5 (PKT)

Chotala (Urdu: چوٹالہ), is a village in the Jhelum District of Punjab, Pakistan. It serves as the central hub for the Chotala union council within Jhelum Tehsil, positioned 18.19 kilometers southwest of Jhelum city and 56 kilometers northeast of Pind Dadan Khan.

== Etymology ==
Chotala is a surname of Hindu origin, likely serving as the namesake for the village. However, there are no individuals in the village bearing that surname.

== Geography ==
Chotala is located in the central part of Jhelum Tehsil, in proximity to the border of Dina Tehsil, within the plains between the Jhelum River and the Salt Range.

== Demographics ==
Historical population
Census	Pop.	Time span (yrs)	%±	Annual RoG %±
1951	1,070	—	—	—
1961	1,391	10	30%	2.66%
1972	2,145	11	54.21%	4.02
1981	2,417	9	12.68%	1.34%
1998	4,647	17	92.26%	3.92%
2017	6,244	19	34.37%	1.57%
2023 (est)	6,856	6	9.8%	1.57%
