= Badlot =

- Location within Pakistan
- Coordinates: 32°55′N 73°36′E
- Country: Pakistan
- Province: Punjab
- District: Jhelum
- Elevation: 231 m (758 ft)

Badlot is a village and union council of Jhelum District in the Punjab Province of Pakistan. It is part of Dina Tehsil, and located at 32°55'0N 73°36'E at an altitude of 231 metres (761 feet).
