= Nara, Jhelum =

Coordinates: 32°48′0″N 73°24′0″E

- Village and union council
- Interactive map of Nara, Jhelum
- Country: Pakistan
- Province: Punjab
- District: Jhelum
- Tehsil: Jhelum
- Time zone: UTC+5 (PST)

Nara is a village and union council of Jhelum District in the Punjab Province of Pakistan. Designated union council # 1 of Jhelum, it is part of Jhelum Tehsil, and is located at 32°48'0N 73°24'0E with an altitude of 236 metres (777 feet). It has about 150 houses mostly populated by Maliks. It is about 45 kilometres from the main city in the district, which is Jhelum.
