= Pandori, Jhelum =

Coordinates: 33°6′0″N 73°37′0″E

Pandori
- Village and union council
- Interactive map of Pandori
- Country: Pakistan
- Province: Punjab
- District: Jhelum
- Tehsil: Dina
- Time zone: UTC+5 (PST)

Pandori (alt. Spelling Pindori) is a village and union council of Jhelum District in the Punjab Province of Pakistan. It is part of Dina Tehsil. It is located at 33°6'0N 73°37'0E, at an altitude of 271 metres (892 feet).
