= Domeli =

Domeli ڈومیلی
- Union Council and village
- Domeli
- Interactive map of Domeli
- Coordinates: 33.012°N 73.354°E
- Country: Pakistan
- Province: Punjab
- District: Jhelum
- Tehsil: Sohawa
- Time zone: UTC+5 (PST)
- ZIP code: 49300
- Area code: 0544
- Website: https://domeli.org

Domeli (Urdu: ڈومیلی) is a village and union council in Sohawa Tehsil, Jhelum District, Punjab, Pakistan. It is situated in the Potohar region of northern Punjab.

== Location ==
Geographical coordinates of the village in decimal degrees are 33.017 in latitude and 73.350 in longitude.
