= Adrana, Jhelum =

Adrana
- Union Council and village
- Location in Pakistan
- Coordinates: 32.974756°N 73.425128°E
- Country: Pakistan
- Province: Punjab
- District: Jhelum
- Tehsil: Sohawa
- Time zone: UTC+5 (PST)
  - Summer (DST): +6

Adrana is a village and union council of Jhelum District in the Punjab province of Pakistan. It is part of Sohawa Tehsil.
