= Boken, Jhelum =

Coordinates: 33°00′59″N 73°43′12″E

Boken بوکن
- Union Council and village
- Interactive map of Boken
- Country: Pakistan
- Province: Punjab
- District: Jhelum
- Tehsil: Jhelum
- Time zone: UTC+5 (PKT)
  - Summer (DST): +6

Boken is a village and union council of Jhelum District in the Punjab Province of Pakistan. It is part of Jhelum Tehsil. Its population is about 17171.
