= Mughalabad =

Coordinates: 33°35′N 73°02′E

Mughalabad مغل آباد
- Village and union council Mughalabad
- Interactive map of Mughalabad
- Country: Pakistan
- Province: Punjab
- District: Jhelum District
- Time zone: UTC+5 (PST)

Mughalabad (Urdu: مغل آباد) is a village and union council of Jhelum District in the Punjab Province of Pakistan. It is part of Jhelum Tehsil.
