= Sohawa Tehsil =

Sohawa تحصیل سوہاوہ
- Tehsil
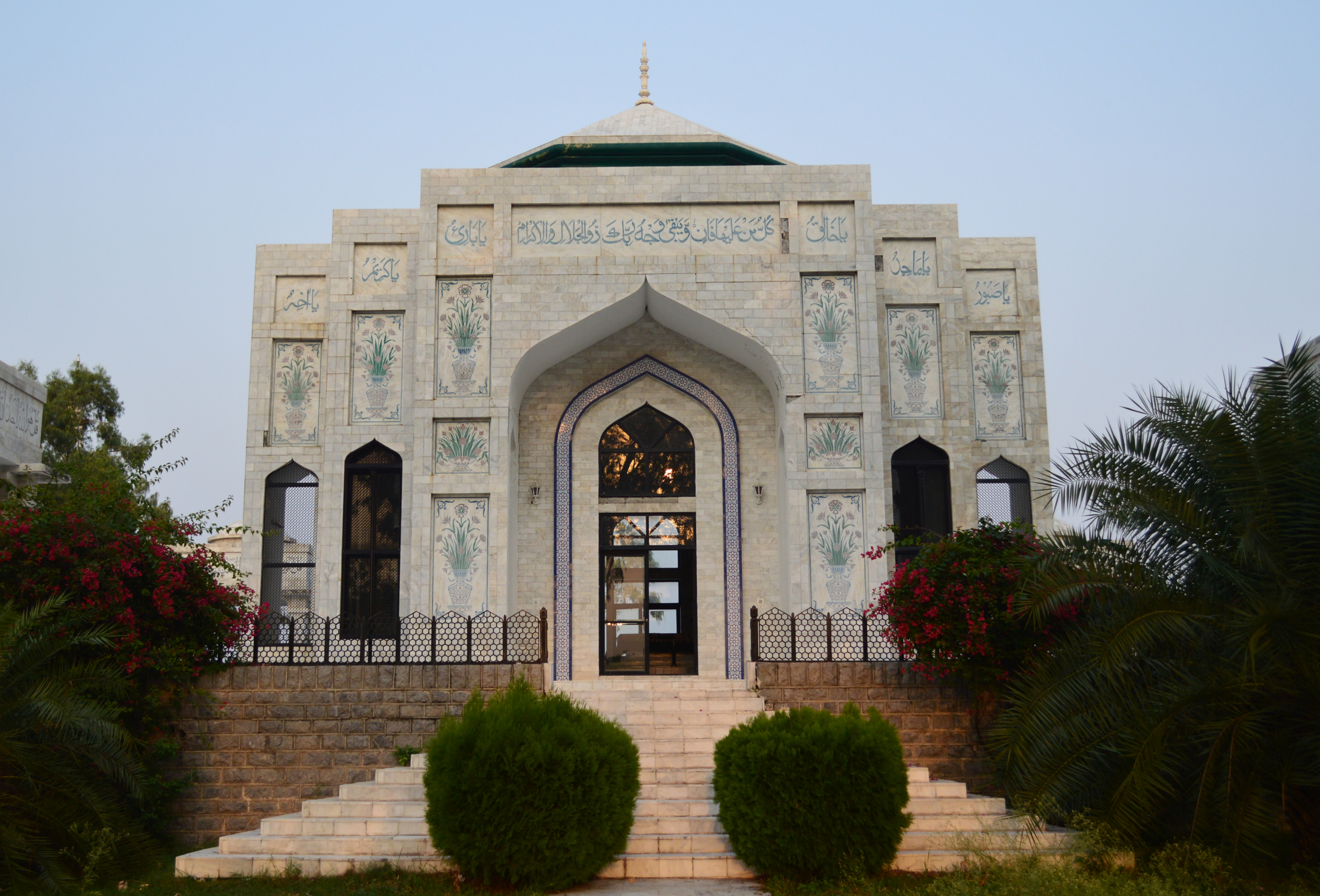
- Tomb of Sultan Shahabuddin Muhammad Ghauri

- Location in Pakistan Sohawa (Pakistan)
- Coordinates: 32°51′0″N 73°0′0″E
- Country: Pakistan
- Province: Punjab
- Division: Rawalpindi
- District: Jhelum

Area
  - Tehsil: 1,258 km^{2} (486 sq mi)

Population (2017 census) (21.6% urban)
  - Tehsil: 201,948
  - Density: 160.5/km^{2} (415.8/sq mi)
  - Urban: 16,000
  - Rural: 185,948

Languages
  - Official: Punjabi, Urdu
- Time zone: UTC+5 (PST)
- Postal Code: 49230
- Area code: 0092544

Sohawa is an administrative sub-division (Tehsil) of the Jhelum District, situated in the Punjab province of Pakistan, located in the northwestern part of the district.

== Union Councils ==
Sohawa Tehsil is subdivided into 9 Union Councils: Adrana, Domeli, Jajial, Kohali, Lehri, Nagial, Pail Bane Khan, Phulrey Sydan, Pind Matay Khan Rai Pur and Sohawa.

== Demographics ==
According to the 2017 census of Pakistan, the most widely spoken first languages were Punjabi (98%), Urdu (1.9%) and Pashto (0.1%); Islam was followed by 100% of the population.
