= Garh Mahal =

- Village and union council
- Interactive map of Garh Mahal
- Coordinates: 32.9804°N 73.57034°E
- Country: Pakistan
- Province: Punjab
- District: Jhelum
- Time zone: UTC+5 (PST)

Garh Mahal is a village and union council of Jhelum District in the Punjab Province of Pakistan. The village, located about 1.5 km from the 16th-century Rohtas Fort, is part of Jhelum Tehsil.
