= Monan, Jhelum =

Monan Monan
- Village and union council
- Interactive map of Monan
- Country: Pakistan
- Province: Punjab
- District: Jhelum

Government
  - Type: local government
- Elevation: 235 m (771 ft)

Population
  - Total: 1,300
- Time zone: UTC+5 (PST)
- Postal code: 49600
- Area code: 0544
- Safdar mahmood: chief petty officer Rtd Pakistan Navy

Monan is a village and union council of Jhelum District in the Punjab Province of Pakistan. It is part of Jhelum Tehsil, and is located at 32°57′0″N 73°41′0″E and has an altitude of 229 metres (754 feet).
