= Darapur =

Coordinates: 32°43′0″N 73°33′0″E

- Village and union council
- Interactive map of Darapur
- Country: Pakistan
- Region: Punjab Province
- District: Jhelum District
- Time zone: UTC+5 (PST)

Darapur is a village and union council of Jhelum District in the Punjab Province of Pakistan. It is part of Jhelum Tehsil, and is located at 32°44'0N 73°33'0E at an altitude of 214 metres (705 feet). Most of the population belong to the Janjua Rajput tribe.

The headquarter of the Nawabs of Jhelum was in Darapur and the area was ruled from here.
