= Jhelum Tehsil =

Administrative subdivision in Punjab province, Pakistan

Jhelum Tehsil تحصیل جہلم
- Tehsil
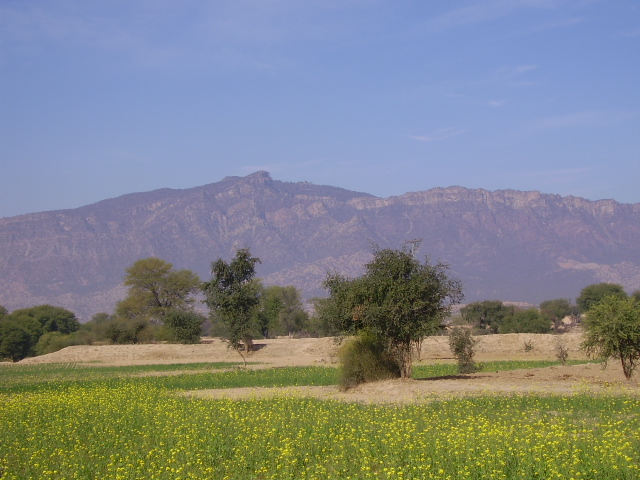
- Tilla Jogian, the highest peak in Jhelum Tehsil
- Country: Pakistan
- Region: Punjab
- District: Jhelum District
- Towns: 1
- Union councils: 17

Languages
  - Official: Punjabi, Urdu
- Time zone: UTC+5 (PST)

Jhelum Tehsil is a tehsil, or administrative subdivision, of Jhelum District in Punjab province, Pakistan. The tehsil is subdivided into 27 union councils and is headquartered at the city of Jhelum.

== Union Councils ==
Jhelum Tehsil is subdivided into 17 union councils:

- Badlot
- Boken
- Chak Khasa
- Chotala
- Darapur
- Dhanyala
- Garh Mahal
- Kala Gujran
- Khukha
- Kotla Faqir
- Madu Kalas
- Monan
- Mughalabad
- Nakka Khurd
- Nara
- Sultanpure
- Sanghoi
- Sohan

== Colleges and schools ==
- Army Public School and College Jhelum Cantt
- Fauji Foundation Model School & College, Jhelum Cantt
- Cantonment Board CMB Model Jhelum
- Govt. Degree College, Jhelum
- Govt. College. G.T. Road, Jhelum
- Govt. College for Women, Jhelum
- Govt. College of Commerce, Bilal Town, Jhelum
- Research Girls College Kala Gujran, Jhelum
- Jinnah Law College Near Kutcheri, Jhelum
- M. A. Jinnah College of Commerce & Computer Science, Jhelum
- Presentation Convent High School for Girls, Jhelum Cantt
- Jhelum Homeopathic Medical College, GT Road Jada, Jhelum
- SLS College of English Language and Information Technology, Jhelum
- National Reformers School Mohallah Khansama, Jhelum
- Cantt Public High School, Jhelum Cantt

== Notable residents ==
- Muhammad Akram, Army officer, recipient of the Nishan-e-Haider
- Tariq Kamal Khan, former Chief of Naval Staff Pakistan Navy
- Syed Manzoor ul Hassan Hashmi, Wing Commander Pakistan Air Force, Sitara-e-Jurrat Bar
- Chaudhry Farrukh Altaf, Ex- District Nazim Jhelum District
- Ch Fawad Hussain (Wazire Science and Technology)is also from JHELUM
- Captain Mohammad Akram
