= Dina Tehsil =

Administrative division of Jhelum District, Punjab, Pakistan

Dina Tehsil تحصِيل دِینہ
- Tehsil
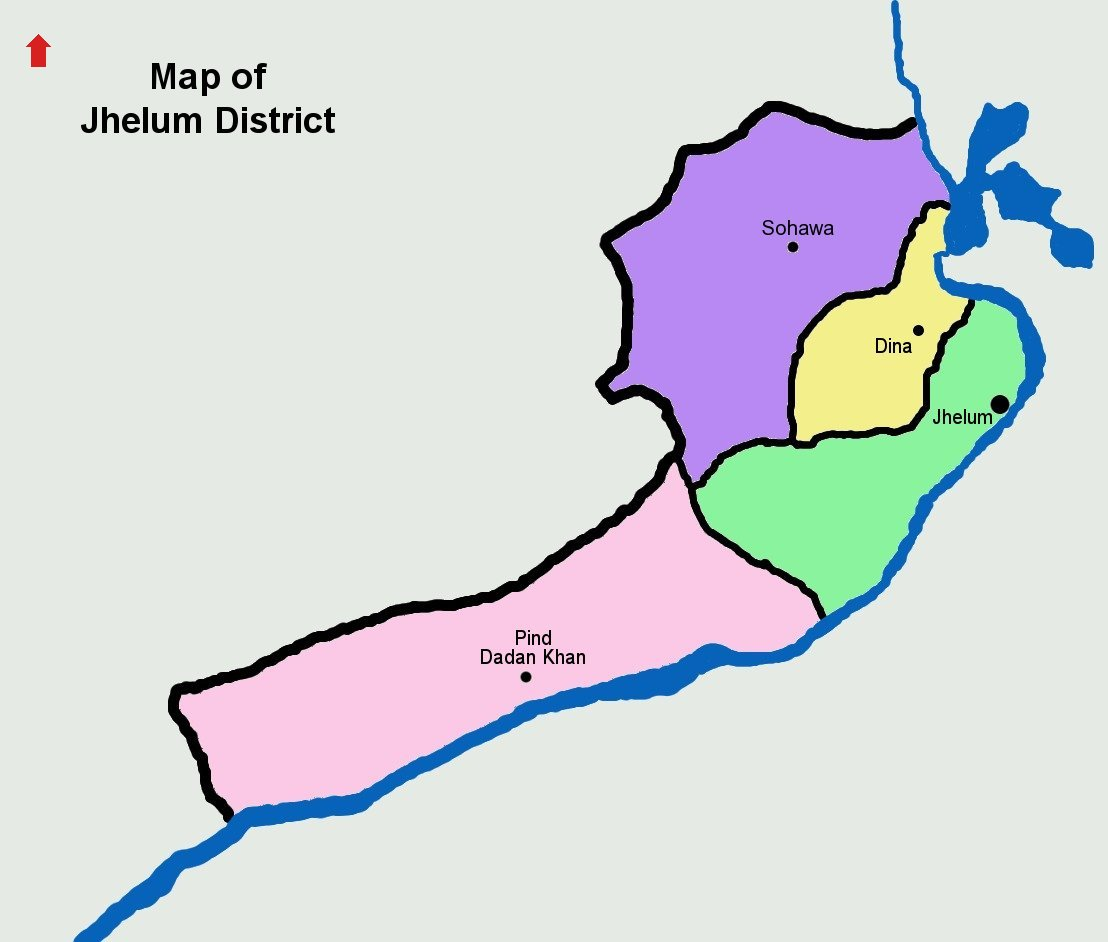
- Country: Pakistan
- Region: Punjab
- District: Jhelum District
- Towns: 1
- Union councils: 11

Population (2017 Pakistani census)
  - Total: 238,660

Languages
  - Official: Punjabi, Urdu
- Time zone: UTC+5 (PST)
  - Summer (DST): UTC+6 (PDT)

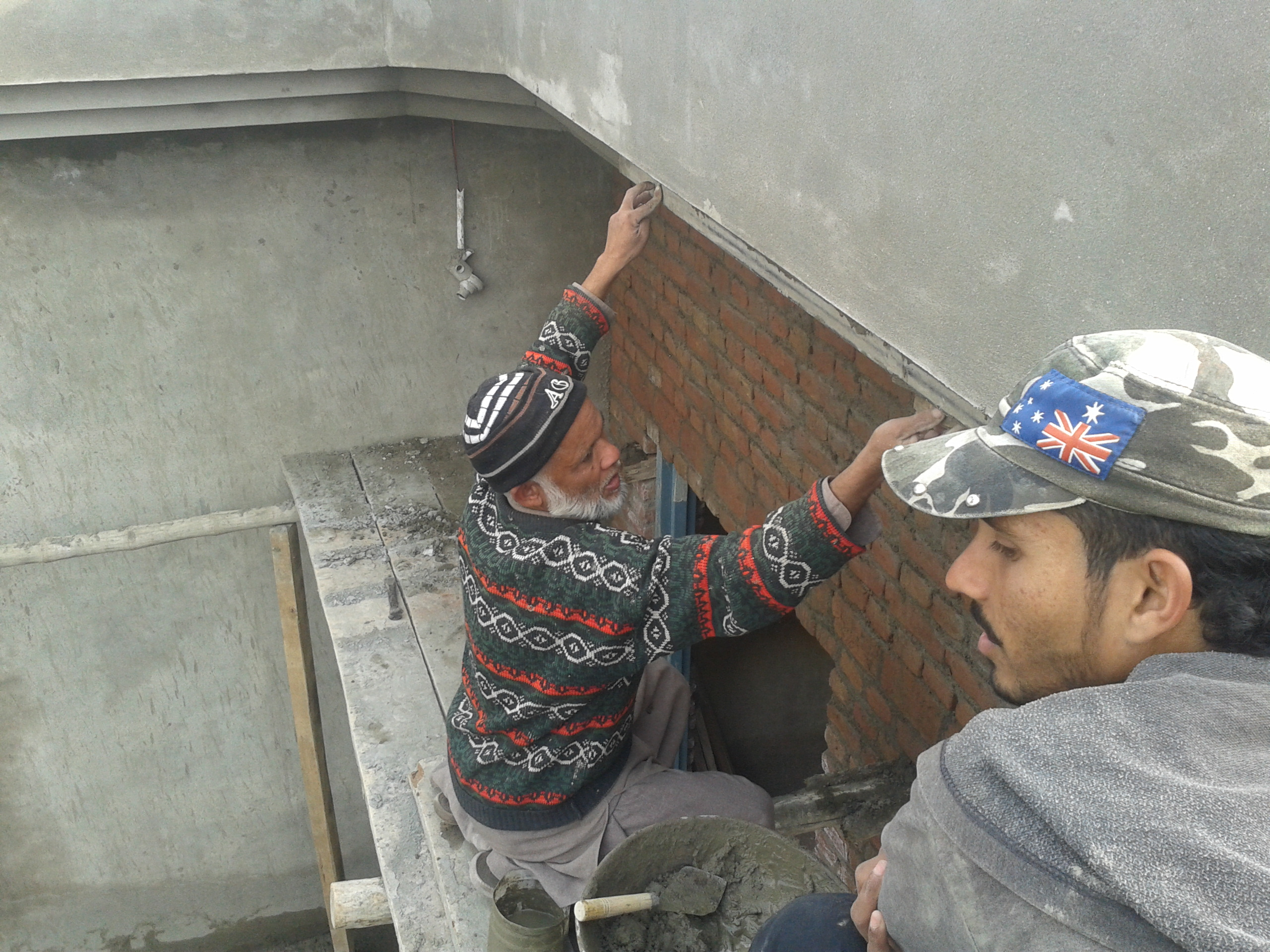
A builder working in Dina.

Dina Tehsil (Urdu: تحصِیل دِینہ) is a tehsil (an administrative subdivision) of Jhelum District in the Punjab province of Pakistan.

The city of Dina is the seat of the administration. It is named after a saint, Baba Dina Shaheed, whose tomb lies near G.T. Road in Domeli Mohalla.

== Union Councils ==
Dina Tehsil is subdivided into 11 Union Councils:

- Ladhar
- Mughlabad
- Dhaniala
- Maddu Kalas
- Dina 1
- Dina 2
- Garh Mahal
- Theekriyaan
- Sohan
- Badlot
- Khukha
