= Khairo =

Khairo may refer to

- Khairo, Punjab, Pakistan
- Khairo, Sindh, Pakistan
