= Khairo, Punjab =

Khairo
- Location within Pakistan
- Coordinates: 30.18°N 70.14°E
- Country: Pakistan
- Province: Punjab
- Elevation: 667 m (2,188 ft)
- Time zone: UTC+5 (PST)

Khairo is a town in the Punjab province of Pakistan. It is located at 30°18'35N 70°14'15E with an altitude of 667 metres (2191 feet).
