= Khairo, Sindh =

Khairo
- Location within Pakistan
- Coordinates: 26.35°N 67.42°E
- Country: Pakistan
- Province: Sindh
- Elevation: 17 m (56 ft)
- Time zone: UTC+5 (PST)

Khairo is a town in the Sindh province of Pakistan. It is located at 26°35'25N 67°42'45E with an altitude of 17 metres (59 feet).
