= Malakwal–Khushab Branch Line =

Railway line in Pakistan

Malakwal–Khushab Branch Line ملکوال-خُوشاب برانچ لائن

Overview
- Other name: Sind–Sagar Railway
- Status: Operational
- Owner: Pakistan Railways
- Termini: Malakwal Junction; Khushab Junction
- Stations: 14

Service
- Operator: Pakistan Railways

History
- Opened: 1 May 1887

Technical
- Line length: 92 km (57 mi)
- Track gauge: 1,676 mm (5 ft 6 in)
- Operating speed: 25 km/h (16 mph)

Malakwal–Khushab Branch Line (Urdu: ملکوال-خُوشاب فرعی ریلوے خط) is one of several branch lines in Pakistan, operated and maintained by Pakistan Railways. The line begins from Malakwal Junction station and ends at Khushab Junction station. The total length of this railway line is 92 kilometers (57 mi). There are 14 railway stations from Malakwal Junction to Khushab Junction. At present, rail traffic on this line is operational from Malakwal Junction to Pind Dadadn Khan Railway Station.This branch line was shortest route to Lalamusa -Kundian - Mianwali.

== History ==
The Malakwal–Khushab branch line was built as part of the Sind–Sagar Railway between 1884 and 1939. In May 1887, the 7,656.25 ft (2,333.62 m) long Victoria Bridge was completed over the Jhelum River between Malakwal and Chak Nizam and a railway line was constructed from Malakwal to Khushab. The line was conceived to haul freight from the mining rich region and served two important smaller railways: the Gharibwal Cement Works Railway and the Dandot Light Railway (serving the Khewra Salt Mine). In 1939, the Victoria bridge had to be completely re-girdered on the old piers when the bridge proved to be incapable of taking increased rail traffic.

=== Dandot Light Railway ===
The Dandot Light Railway opened in 1905 as a 10 kilometres (6.2 mi) 610 mm (2 ft) narrow gauge railway from Dandot railway station to Chalisa Junction railway station.After some years it was converted to broad gauge (5 Feet 6 Inches). It was built to serve the Khewra Salt Mine. This railway line was closed since 2010 but rehabilitation work started in 2021 and in 2022, its fully operational.

=== Gharibwal Cement Works Railway ===
The Gharibwal Cement Works Railway opened in May 1886 as a 27 kilometres (17 mi) 1,676 mm (5 ft 6 in) railway from Haranpur Junction to Gharibwal. It was built to serve the Gharibwal quarry.

== Stations ==
- Malakwal Junction
- Chak Nizam (Abandoned)
- Haranpur Junction > to Gharibwal
- Chalisa Junction > to Dandot Light Railway
- Pind Dadan Khan

Abandoned section

- Golpur
- Saroba
- Tobah
- Lilla
- Lilla Town
- Kandwal Halt
- Dhak Janjua
- Rakh Rajar
- Sandral
- Khushab Junction
