= Pind Dadan Khan Shuttle =

Rail line in Pakistan

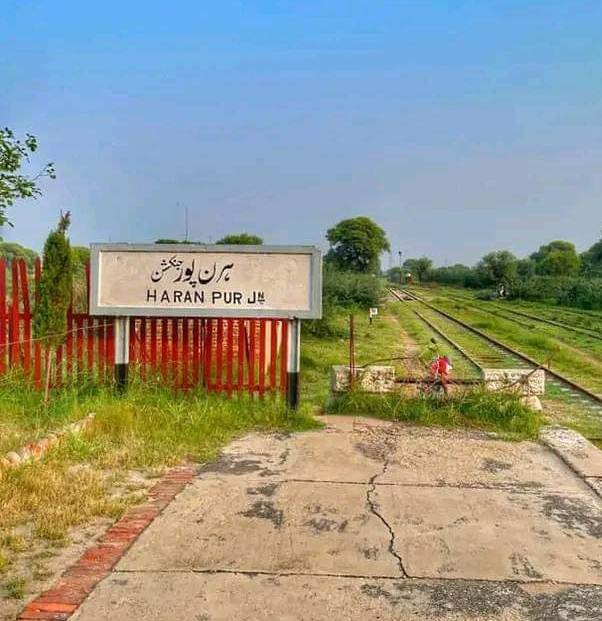
- Haranpur Railway Junction on the route of the Pind Dadan Khan Shuttle

Overview
- Service type: Shuttle
- Current operator: Pakistan Railways

Route
- Service frequency: Daily
- Train numbers: 274DN (Malakwal Junction→Pind Dadan Khan); 275UP (Pind Dadan Khan→Lala Musa Junction)

On-board services
- Class: Economy

Technical
- Track gauge: 1,676 mm (5 ft 6 in)
- Track owner: Pakistan Railways

Pind Dadan Khan Shuttle (Urdu: پنڈ دادن خان شٹل) is a shuttle service operated by Pakistan Railways between different stations i.e Malakwal Junction and Pind Dadan Khan, Pind Dadan Khan and Lala Musa Junction.

== Importance of the rail link ==
The rail link between Malakwal and Pind Dadan Khan holds significance due to the absence of a parallel road connection between the two cities. The only existing route via Rasul is significantly longer than the rail distance, making the train service the preferred option for locals traveling between the two destinations.

== Victoria bridge ==
The train route from Malakwal to Pind Dadan Khan passes through Victoria Bridge, located in Haranpur over the Jhelum River. Constructed in 1887 by the British engineer William St. John Galwey, the bridge comprises iron trusses supported by concrete piers. It spans a length of 2.6 miles (4.225 km) and stands as one of the longest railway bridges in Pakistan. Although intended for railway use, it has become a perilous passage for motorcyclists, posing risks. The bridge, rebuilt in 1939 due to sustainability issues for rail traffic, offers passengers a scenic view of the Salt Range and is situated approximately 35 km from the Lilla Interchange on the M-2.

== Closure due to COVID-19 pandemic ==
The train service remained inactive for nearly three years, from 2020 to 2022, due to the lockdowns imposed during the COVID-19 pandemic in Pakistan.

== Route and station stops ==
Malakwal Junction–Pind Dadan Khan via the Malakwal-Khushab Branch Line and Malakwal Junction–Lala Musa Junction via the Shorkot-Lala Musa Branch Line

== Station Stops ==
Train stops on all stations between Lala Musa and Sargodha, and Malakwal and Pind Dadan Khan

== Equipment ==
The Pind Dadan Khan Shuttle Train only offers economy class seating as it is a shuttle service.
