= Abandoned and dismantled railway lines in Pakistan =

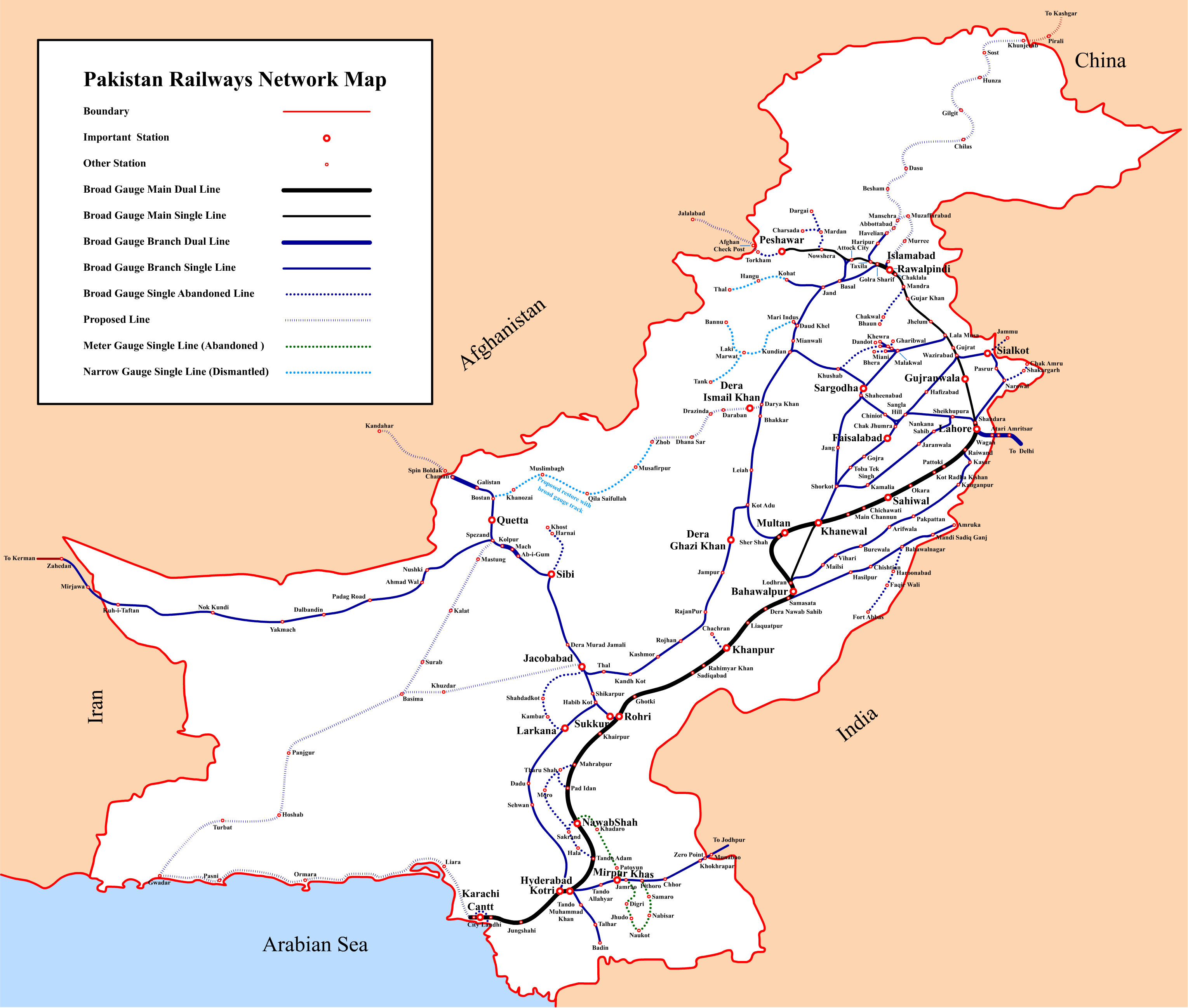
Pakistan Railways Map

Following the Partition of India in 1947, Pakistan gained independence and inherited various railway lines with a route length of 9,012 kilometres (5,600 miles). Some of those lines were subsequently abandoned or dismantled, such as:

== Broad gauge ==
- Amruka-Fazlika Branch Line 38 kilometers line closed in 1947.
- Bahawalnagar–Fort Abbas Branch Line, 102 kilometers closed in 2002.
- Fort Abbas-Samasata Branch Line, 128 kilometers line removed, due to 2nd world war demands.
- Gharibwal Cement Works Railway (Gharibwal railway station to Haranpur Junction railway station) 10 kilometers line closed.
- Hyderabad-Badin Branch Line, 109 kilometers line, closed in 2020.
- Jammu–Sialkot Railway, 43 kilometers line, closed in 1947.
- Jaranwala-Lyallpur Branch Line, 35 kilometers line, removed in 1940 due to 2nd world war demands.
- Karachi Circular Railway, closed in 1999.
- Kasur-Firozpur Branch Line 39 Kilometers Line closed in 1947.
- Kasur-KhemKaran Branch Line 30 Kilometers Line closed In 1947.
- Khanpur–Chachran Branch Line, 34 kilometers line closed in 1991.
- Khyber Pass Railway, 50 kilometers line, closed in 2006.
- Lahore-Wagah Branch Line, 24 kilometers line, closed in 2019.
- Larkana-Jacobabad Branch Line, 136 kilometers loop line, closed nearly 2000.
- Malakwal–Bhera Branch Line, 28 kilometers line closed in 2005.
- Malakwal–Khushab Branch Line, 70 kilometers section between Pind Dadan Khan and Khushab is closed.
- Mandi Sadiq Ganj-Hindu Malkot Branch Line 36 kilometers line closed in 1947.
- Mandra–Bhaun Branch Line, 74 kilometers line, closed in 1993.
- Mardan-Charsadda Branch Line, 29 Kilometers line closed in 1985.
- Nawabshah-Sakrand Branch Line, 24 kilometers line, closed in 1988.
- Nowshera–Dargai Branch Line, 64 kilometers line, closed in 2007.
- Pad Idan-Tharushah Branch Line, 29 kilometers line, closed in 1988.
- Samasata–Amruka Branch Line, 257 kilometers line, closed in 2011.
- Shahdara Bagh–Chak Amru Branch Line, 52 kilometers section between Narowal and Chak Amru closed in 2005.
- Sibi-Zardalu Branch Line, 143 kilometers line, re-opened in 2023 and again closed in 2024.
- Tando Adam-Mehrabpur Branch Line, 202 kilometers line, closed in 1988.

== Narrow gauge ==
- Bannu–Tank Branch Line, 122 kilometer narrow gauge railway, constructed in 1913, dismantled in 1995.
- Daud Khel–Lakki Marwat Branch Line, 82 km narrow gauge section between Mari Indus and Lakki Marwat, constructed in 1913, dismantled in 1995.
- Jand–Thal Branch Line, 100 kilometer narrow gauge section from Kohat to Thal, constructed in 1903, abandoned in 1991.
- Zhob Valley Railway (Boston–Zhob), 298 kilometer narrow gauge railway, closed in 1985 and dismantled in 2008.

=== Meter gauge ===
- Jamrao-Pithoro Loop Line (184 km closed in 2005)
- Mirpur Khas–Nawabshah Branch Line (129 km closed in 2005)
