= Dhak railway station =

Railway station in Pakistan

Dhak Janjua Railway Station ڈھاک جنجوعہ ریلوے اسٹیشن

General information
- Coordinates: 32.426754°N 72.537253°E
- Owner: Ministry of Railways
- Line: Malakwal–Khushab Branch Line

Other information
- Station code: DAK

Services
Preceding station	Pakistan Railways	Following station
Kandwal Halt towards Malakwal Junction	Malakwal–Khushab Branch Line	Rakh Rajar towards Khushab Junction
Location

Dhak Railway Station (Urdu: ڈھاک جنجوعہ ریلوے اسٹیشن) is located in Dhak Janjua, a village in Pakistan.

== Geography ==
Dhak Janjua is situated on the bank of River Jhelum. It lies on the Sher Shah Suri road. It connects Khushab to Lillah Interchange M-2 (Lahore-Islamabad Motorway).

The station is situated on the southern side of Police Station Katha Sagral. Dhak Janjua is bounded by in the north by Kurar Talokar and Jaswal, in the East by the river and Megha and Beerbal Sharif (across the river), to the east by Bansi and Balwal villages and on the west by Rakh Rajjar and Chak NO. 65 and Madham.

== History ==
A railway line of 2 1/2 feet was erected prior to 1947 leading to the hilly area of Diwal next after Talkor Village for transporting coal, salt and other minerals mined from the Salt Range.

During the British Regime and thereafter from KALAs regime no development work was done in these villages. Underground water owing to the nearby Salt Range is sour qua Salt. During Khizer Hayat Tiwana Regime Canal was built which irrigates the village. The best Basmati is grown in the village Dhak Janjua. Owing to being on the tail of the canal now water resources are meagre to meet the purpose, therefore the poor Farmers families are selling their agricultural land on throw-away price and are leaving for nearby cities.
