= Khewra railway station =

Railway station in Pakistan

Khewra Railway Station کھیوڑہ ریلوے اسٹیشن
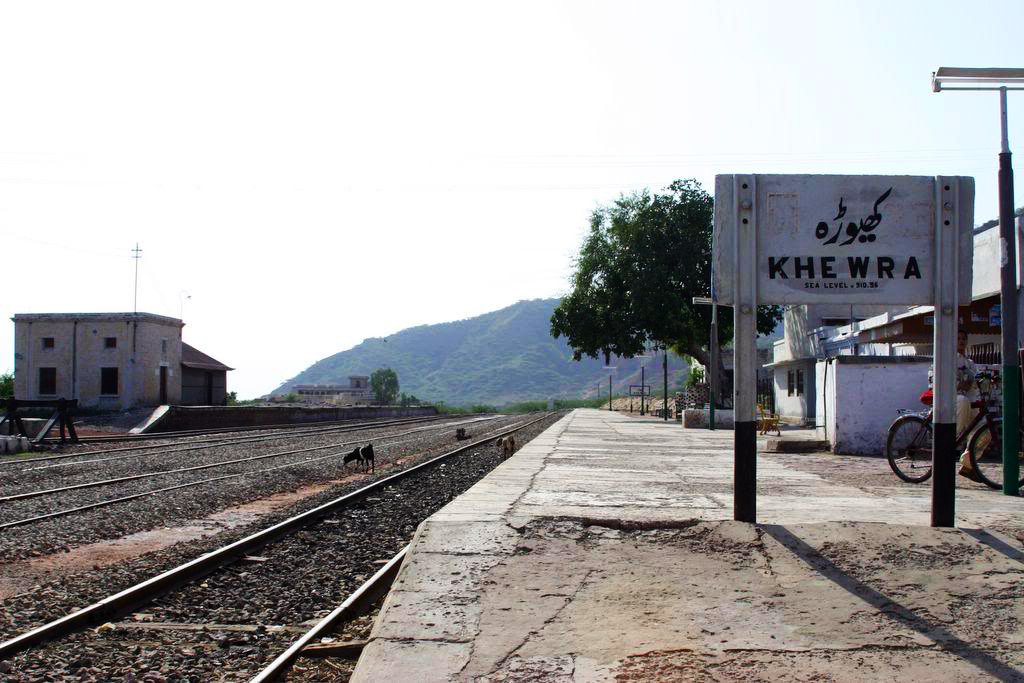

General information
- Coordinates: 32.6408°N 73.0094°E
- Owner: Ministry of Railways
- Line: Dandot Light Railway

Other information
- Station code: KWA

History
- Opened: 1890

Services
Preceding station	Pakistan Railways	Following station
Dandot Terminus	Dandot Light Railway	Sodian Gujar towards Chalisa Junction
Location

Khewra Railway Station (Urdu: کھیوڑہ ریلوے اسٹیشن) is located in the vicinity of Khewra city, which is part of Pind Dadan Khan Tehsil, in the Jhelum District of Pakistan. It was constructed to facilitate the transportation of salt from Khewra Salt Mine to the rest of the country.

However, the station has seen little traffic since the 1990s, as the salt is now transport via road through trucks and trailers. The last train arrived at the station in 2010.

== See also ==
- List of railway stations in Pakistan
- Pakistan Railways
