= Kandwal Halt railway station =

Railway station in Pakistan

Kandwal Halt Railway Station کنڈوال ہالٹ ریلوے اسٹیشن

General information
- Coordinates: 32.51054°N 72.676299°E
- Owner: Ministry of Railways
- Line: Malakwal–Khushab Branch Line

Other information
- Station code: KDWL

Services
Preceding station	Pakistan Railways	Following station
Lilla towards Malakwal Junction	Malakwal–Khushab Branch Line	Dhak towards Khushab Junction
Location

Kandwal Halt Railway Station (Urdu: کنڈوال ہالٹ ریلوے اسٹیشن) is located in Pakistan.

== See also ==
- List of railway stations in Pakistan
- Pakistan Railways
