= Golpur railway station =

Railway station in Pakistan

Coordinates: 32.581961°N 72.91648°E

Golpur Railway Station گول پور ریلوے اسٹیشن

General information
- Owner: Ministry of Railways
- Line: Malakwal–Khushab Branch Line

Other information
- Station code: GPE

Services
Preceding station	Pakistan Railways	Following station
Pind Dadan Khan towards Malakwal Junction	Malakwal–Khushab Branch Line	Saroba towards Khushab Junction
Location

Golpur Railway Station (Urdu: گول پور ریلوے اسٹیشن) is located in Punjab, Pakistan.

== See also ==
- List of railway stations in Pakistan
- Pakistan Railways
