= Tobah railway station =

Railway station in Punjab, Pakistan

Tobah Railway Station ٹوبہ ریلوے اسٹیشن

General information
- Coordinates: 32.5741°N 72.8211°E
- Owner: Ministry of Railways
- Line: Malakwal–Khushab Branch Line

Other information
- Station code: TOBA

Services
Preceding station	Pakistan Railways	Following station
Saroba towards Malakwal Junction	Malakwal–Khushab Branch Line	Lilla towards Khushab Junction
Location

Tobah Railway Station (Urdu: ٹوبہ ریلوے اسٹیشن) is located in union council Tobah, Jhelum District, Punjab, Pakistan.

== See also ==
- List of railway stations in Pakistan
- Pakistan Railways
