= Khewra Salt Mines Railway =

Pakistani electric railway

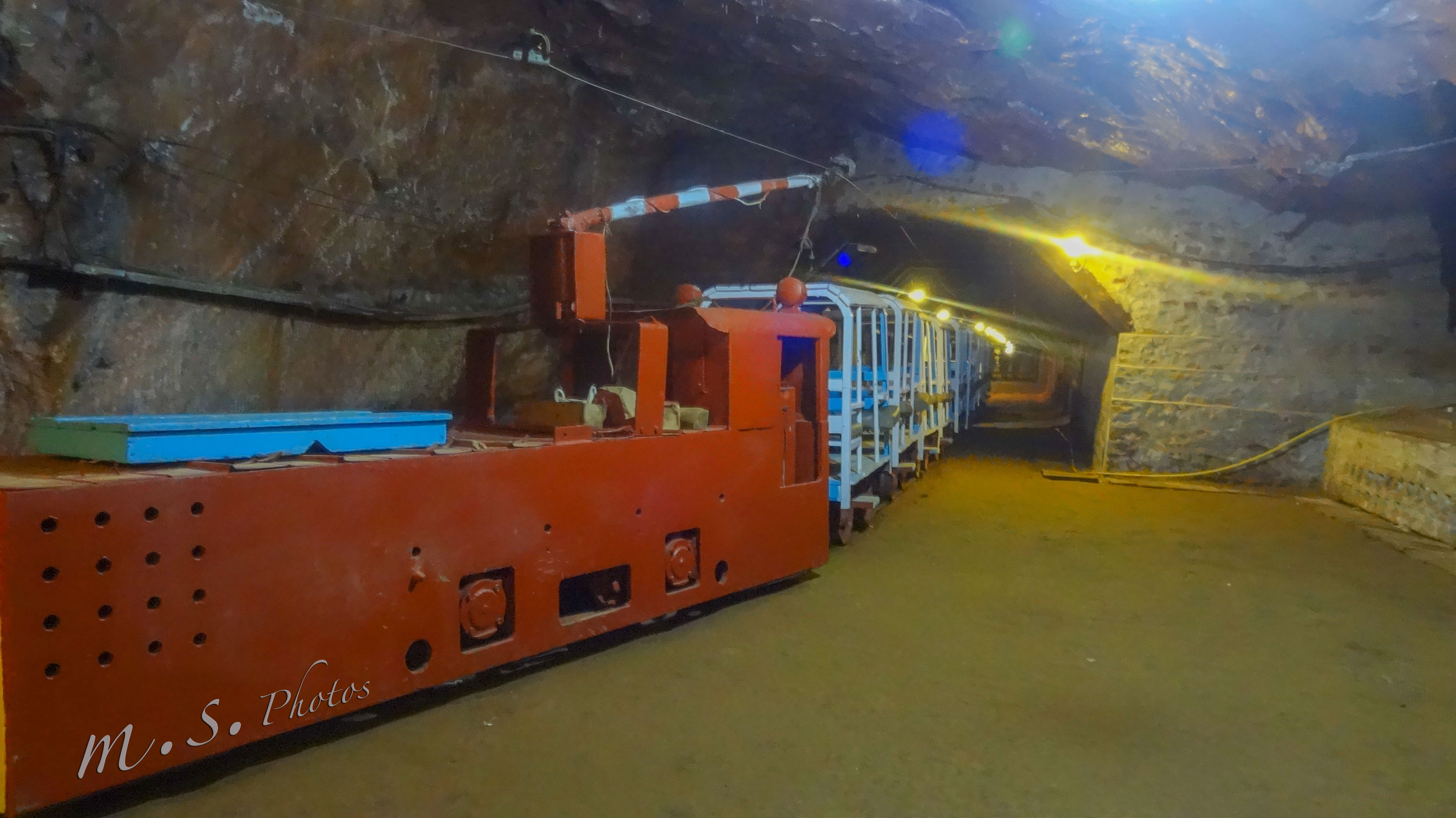
Khewra mine railway

The Khewra Salt Mines Railway (Urdu: کھیوڑہ نمک کی کان ریلوے) is a 600 mm (1 ft 11 5/8 in) narrow-gauge electric railway located at the Khewra Salt Mines in Khewra, Pakistan. Built in 1930, it once hauled extracted salt from the mines, but now brings tourists in to marvel at the salt formations. The mine is still the largest source of salt in Pakistan with more than 350,000 tons produced per year, excavated at 18 different working levels.

== See also ==
- Khewra railway station
- Pakistan Railways
- Khewra Salt Mine
