= Pind Dadan Khan railway station =

Railway station in Pakistan

Pind Dadan Khan Station پنڈ دادن خان ریلوے اسٹیشن

General information
- Coordinates: 32.5937°N 73.0457°E
- Owner: Ministry of Railways
- Line: Malakwal–Khushab Branch Line

Other information
- Station code: PDK

Services
Preceding station	Pakistan Railways	Following station
Chalisa Junction towards Malakwal Junction	Malakwal–Khushab Branch Line	Golpur towards Khushab Junction
Location

Pind Dadan Khan railway station (Urdu: پنڈ دادن خان ریلوے اسٹیشن) is located in Pind Dadan Khan, Jhelum district, Pakistan on the Malakwal-Khushab Branch Line. Currently, the station serves as the terminus for Pind Dadan Khan Shuttle train operating between Lala Musa Junction railway station and Pind Dadan Khan railway station

== See also ==
- List of railway stations in Pakistan
- Pakistan Railways
