= Saroba railway station =

Railway station in Pakistan

Coordinates: 32°35′N 72°52′E

Saroba Railway Station سروبا ریلوے اسٹیشن

General information
- Owner: Ministry of Railways
- Line: Malakwal–Khushab Branch Line

Other information
- Station code: SRBX

Services
Preceding station	Pakistan Railways	Following station
Golpur towards Malakwal Junction	Malakwal–Khushab Branch Line	Tobah towards Khushab Junction
Location

Saroba Railway Station (Urdu: سروبا ریلوے اسٹیشن) is located in Pakistan.

== See also ==
- List of railway stations in Pakistan
- Pakistan Railways
