= Himalayan salt =

Rock salt from Pakistan

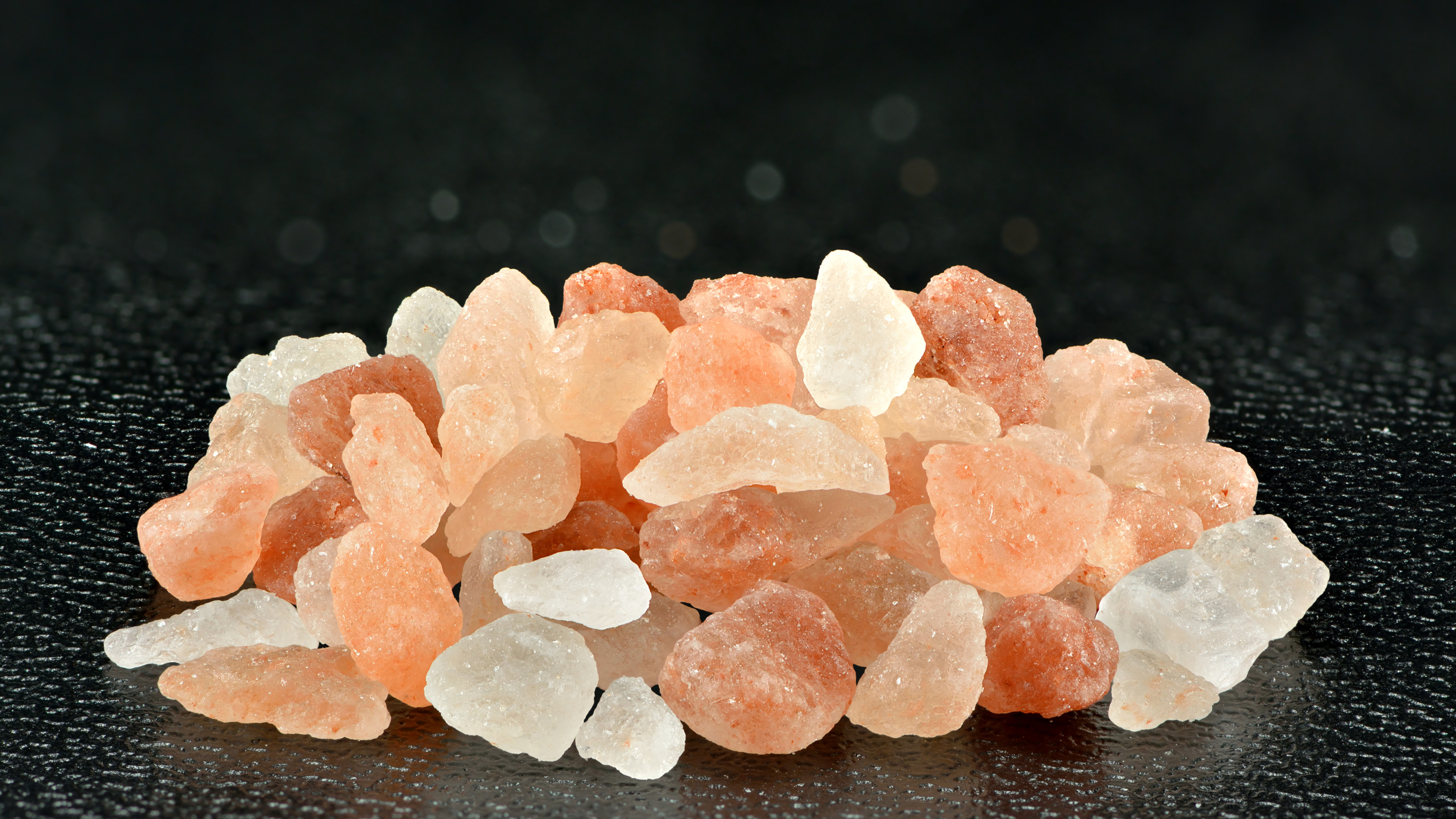
Himalayan salt (coarse)

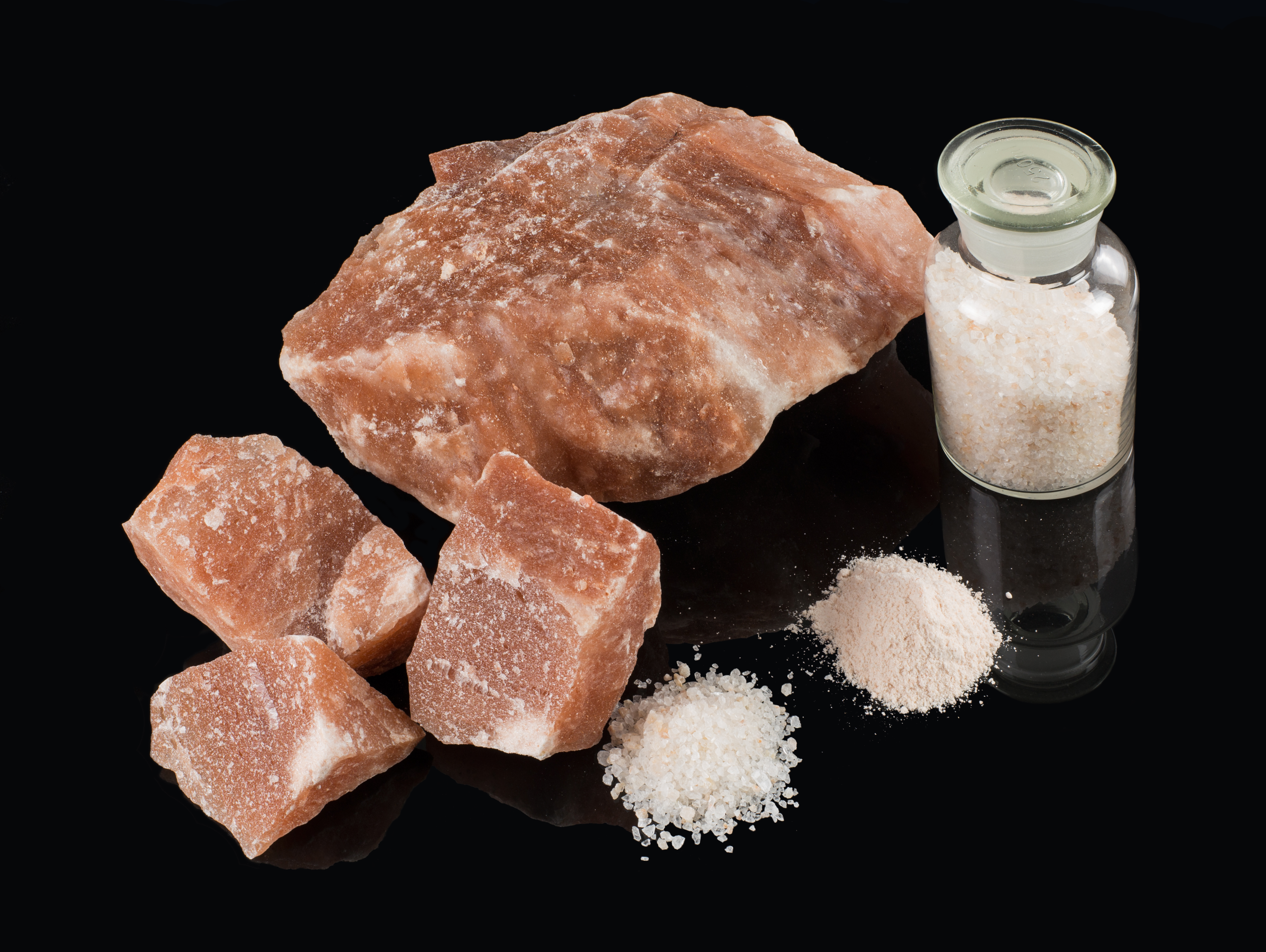
Himalayan salt from Khewra Salt Mine near Khewra, Punjab, Pakistan

Himalayan salt is rock salt (halite) mined from the Punjab region of Pakistan. The salt, which often has a pinkish tint due to trace minerals, is primarily used as a food additive to replace refined table salt but is also used for cooking and food presentation, decorative lamps, and spa treatments. The product is often promoted with unsupported claims that it has health benefits.

== Geology ==
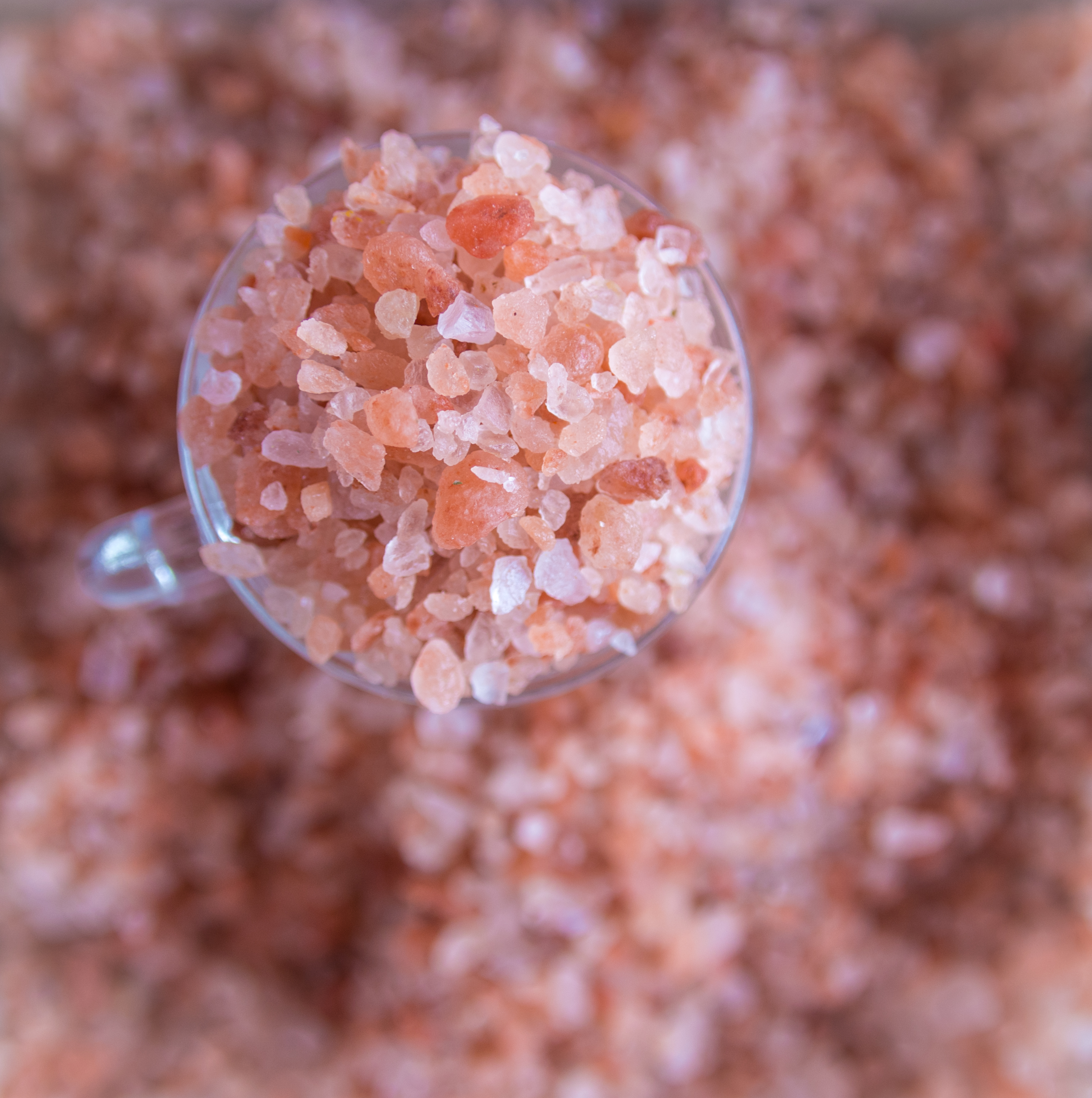
Himalayan salt

Himalayan salt is mined from the Salt Range mountains, the southern edge of a fold-and-thrust belt that underlies the Pothohar Plateau south of the Himalayas in Pakistan. Himalayan salt comes from a thick layer of Ediacaran to early Cambrian evaporites of the Salt Range Formation. This geological formation consists of crystalline halite intercalated with potash salts, overlain by gypsiferous marl and interlayered with beds of gypsum and dolomite with infrequent seams of oil shale that accumulated between 600 and 540 million years ago. These strata and the overlying Cambrian to Eocene sedimentary rocks were thrust southward over younger sedimentary rocks, and eroded to create the Salt Range.

== History ==
Local legend traces the discovery of the Himalayan salt deposits to the army of Alexander the Great. However, the first records of mining are from the Janjua clan in the 1200s. The salt is mostly mined at the Khewra Salt Mine in Khewra, Jhelum District, Punjab, Pakistan, which is situated in the foothills of the Salt Range hill system between the Indus River and the Punjab Plain. It is primarily exported in bulk, and processed in other countries for the consumer market.

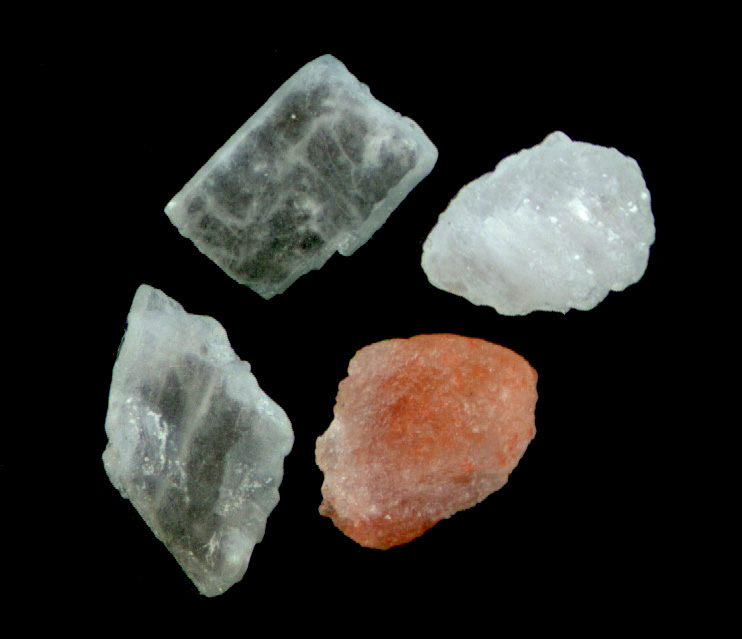
Himalayan salt crystals

== Mineral composition ==
Himalayan salt is a table salt. There is a common misconception that Himalayan salt has lower sodium than conventional table salt, but the levels are similar. Analysis of a range of Khewra salt samples showed them to be between 96% and 99% sodium chloride, with trace presence of calcium, iron, zinc, chromium, magnesium, and sulfates, all at varying safe levels below 1%.

Some salt crystals from this region have an off-white to transparent color, while the trace minerals in some veins of salt give it a pink, reddish, or beet-red color.

Nutritionally, Himalayan salt is similar to common table salt. A study of pink salts in Australia showed Himalayan salt to contain higher levels of a range of trace elements compared to table salt, but that the levels were too low for nutritional significance without an "exceedingly high intake", at which point any nutritional benefit would be outweighed by the risks of elevated sodium consumption. An important exception is essential mineral iodine. Commercial table salt in many countries is supplemented with iodine, and this has significantly reduced disorders of iodine deficiency. Himalayan salt does not provide this benefit, unless it is iodized.

== Uses ==
Himalayan salt is used to flavor food. Due mainly to marketing costs, pink Himalayan salt is up to 20 times more expensive than table salt or sea salt. The impurities giving it its distinctive pink hue, as well as its unprocessed state and lack of anti-caking agents, have given rise to the unsupported belief that it is healthier than common table salt. There is no scientific basis for such claimed health benefits. In the United States, the Food and Drug Administration warned a manufacturer of dietary supplements, including one consisting of Himalayan salt, to discontinue marketing the products using unproven claims of health benefits.

Slabs of salt are used as serving dishes, baking stones, and griddles, and it is also used to make tequila shot glasses. In such uses, small amounts of salt transfer to the food or drink and alter its flavor profile.

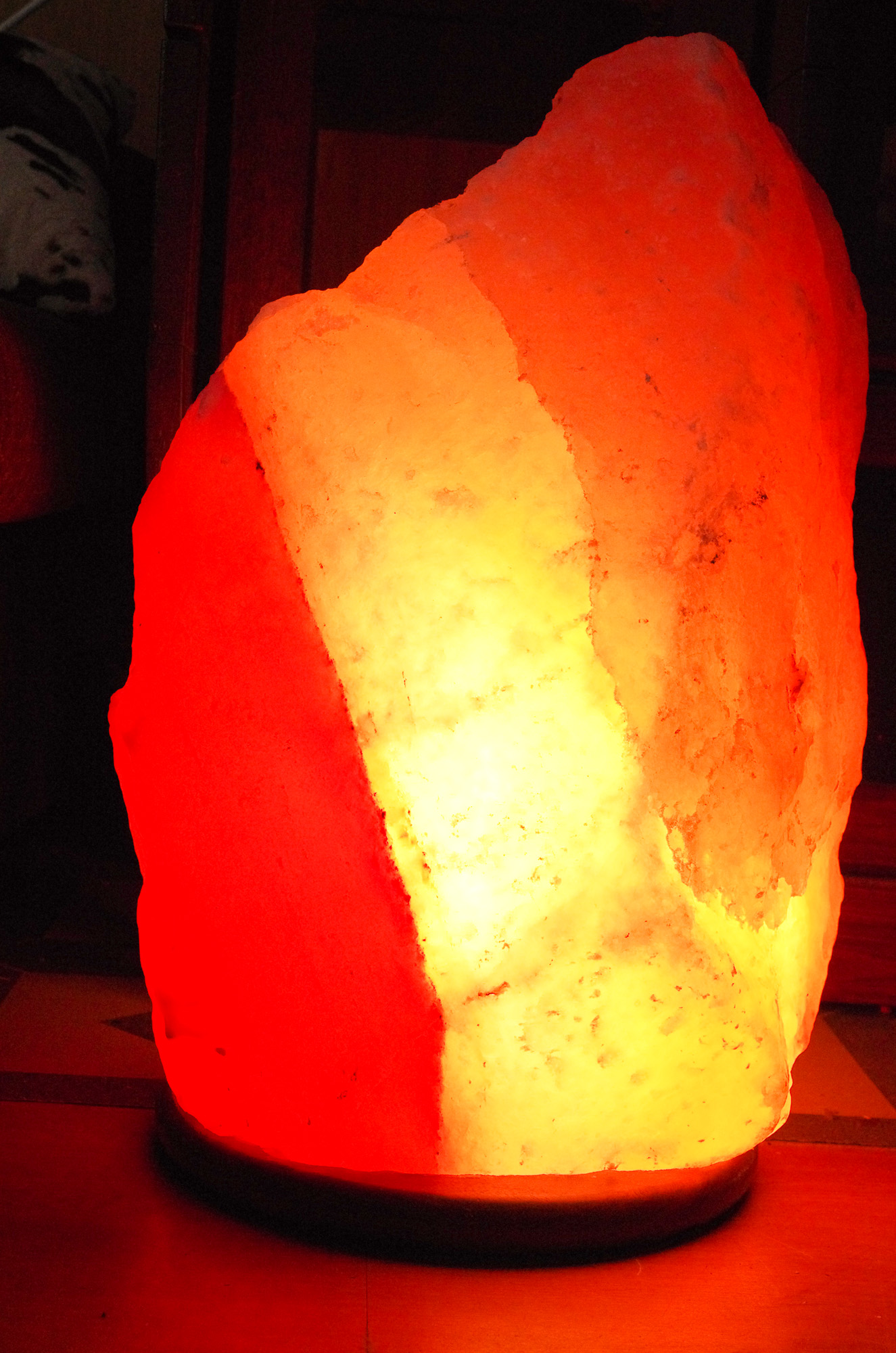
Salt lamp

It is also used to make salt lamps that radiate a pinkish or orangish hue, manufactured by placing a light source within the hollowed-out interior of a block of Himalayan salt. Claims that their use results in the release of ions that benefit health have no scientific foundation. Similar scientifically unsupported claims underlie the use of Himalayan salt to line the walls of spas, along with its use for salt-inhalation spa treatments. Salt lamps can be a danger to pets, who may suffer salt poisoning after licking them.

== Impact of India–Pakistan trade tensions ==
In 2025, the trade of Himalayan pink salt faced a major disruption due to renewed geopolitical tensions between India and Pakistan. Following the April 2025 Pahalgam terror attack, in which 26 individuals – all Indian Hindu tourists – were killed, the Indian government imposed a ban on the import of all goods from Pakistan, including those routed via third countries. This measure led to an immediate halt in the cross-border trade of pink salt.

India had been one of the largest markets for Himalayan pink salt, traditionally sourced from Pakistan's Khewra Salt Mine. For decades, Indian importers had brought in thousands of tonnes quarterly to meet demand, with the salt widely used in culinary practices, wellness products, and religious rituals – particularly by Hindus during fasting periods due to its non-marine origin.

The ban not only disrupted supply chains in India but also resulted in significant economic losses for Pakistani exporters, many of whom relied heavily on Indian demand to sustain large-scale pink salt operations.

== See also ==
- Health effects of salt
- List of edible salts
- List of topics characterized as pseudoscience
- Sea salt
- Table salt
