= Chak Nizam railway station =

Railway station in Pakistan

Chak Nizam Railway Station چک نظام ریلوے اسٹیشن

General information
- Coordinates: 32.5724°N 73.1625°E
- Owner: Ministry of Railways
- Line: Malakwal–Khushab Branch Line

Other information
- Station code: CKZ

Services
Preceding station	Pakistan Railways	Following station
Malakwal Junction Terminus	Malakwal–Khushab Branch Line	Haranpur Junction towards Khushab Junction
Location

Chak Nizam Railway Station (Urdu: چک نظام ریلوے اسٹیشن) is located in Pakistan.

== See also ==
- List of railway stations in Pakistan
- Pakistan Railways
