= MKW =

MKW or variations may refer to:

- Mario Kart Wii, a 2008 kart racing video game by Nintendo for the Wii
- Mario Kart World, a 2025 kart racing video game by Nintendo for the Nintendo Switch 2
- MKW, the IATA code for Rendani Airport, Manokwari, West Papua, Indonesia
- MKW, the station code for Malakwal Junction railway station, Punjab, Pakistan
- mkw, the ISO 639-3 code for Kituba language in Republic of the Congo
- Man-Kzin Wars, a military history shared universe first published in 1988
