= Haranpur Junction railway station =

Railway station in Pakistan

Haranpur Junction Station ہرن پور جنکشن ریلوے اسٹیشن
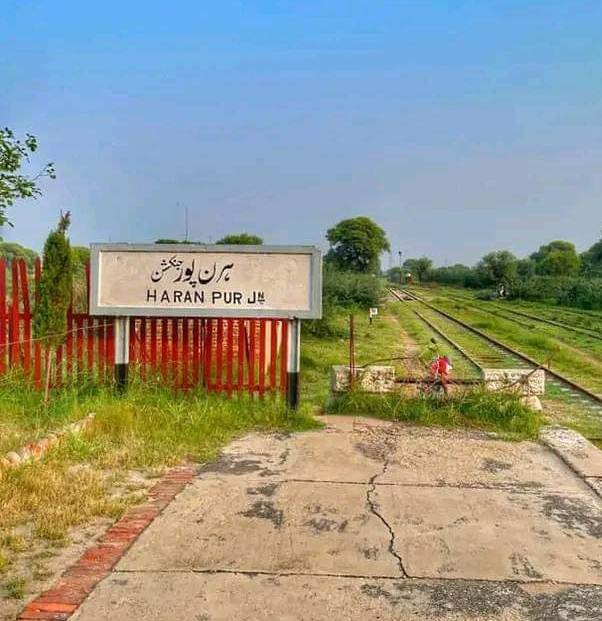

General information
- Coordinates: 32.599649°N 73.148594°E
- Owner: Ministry of Railways
- Line: Malakwal–Khushab Branch Line
- Platforms: 1

Other information
- Station code: HNP

Services
Preceding station	Pakistan Railways	Following station
Chak Nizam towards Malakwal Junction	Malakwal–Khushab Branch Line	Chalisa Junction towards Khushab Junction
Terminus	Gharibwal Cement Works	Gharibwal Terminus
Location

Haranpur Junction Railway Station (Urdu: ہرن پور جنکشن ریلوے اسٹیشن) is located in Pakistan. The station is 9 km from Malakwal Junction railway station.

== See also ==
- List of railway stations in Pakistan
- Pakistan Railways
