= Lilla railway station =

Railway station in Pakistan

Coordinates: 32.547423°N 72.731976°E

Lilla Railway Station للہ ریلوے اسٹیشن

General information
- Owner: Ministry of Railways
- Line: Malakwal–Khushab Branch Line

Other information
- Station code: LLA

Services
Preceding station	Pakistan Railways	Following station
Tobah towards Malakwal Junction	Malakwal–Khushab Branch Line	Kandwal Halt towards Khushab Junction
Location

Lilla Railway Station (Urdu: للہ ریلوے اسٹیشن) is located in Pakistan. Lilla is a town in the Jhelum District.

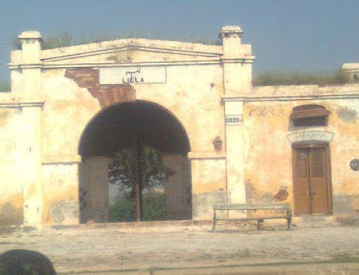
Lilla Railway Station

== See also ==
- List of railway stations in Pakistan
- Pakistan Railways
