= HZP =

HZP may refer to:

- Fort MacKay/Horizon Airport, in Alberta, Canada
- Hamerton Zoo Park, in England
- Hazurpur railway station, in Pakistan
- Padmaja Naidu Himalayan Zoological Park, in Darjeeling, West Bengal, India
