= Sind–Sagar Railway =

Railway in British India (1881–1885)

- Industry: Railways
- Founded: 1881
- Defunct: 1885
- Successor: North Western State Railway (NWR)
- Headquarters: Kotri, British India
- Area served: Punjab, Sindh
- Services: Rail transport

The Sind–Sagar Railway was originally constructed as a Metre Gauge railway line from Lala Musa to Malakwal. In 1886 the Sind–Sagar Railway was amalgamated with other railways to form the North Western State Railway and railway line from was converted to broad gauge. The Chak Nizam Bridge, also known as Victoria Bridge, was completed in early 1887 over the Jhelum River in Shahpur District and connected Jhelum to Lahore. The NWR Sind-Sagar Branch Line was the new name for the line and continued to be extended with branch lines and designated as part of the 'Frontier Section - Military Line'.

== Sections ==
=== Lala Musa–Malakwal Railway ===
- Lala Musa Junction–Malakwal Junction (today part of the Shorkot–Lalamusa Branch Line)

=== Malakwal–Khushab Railway ===
- Malakwal Junction–Khushab Junction

==== Gharibwal Cement Works Railway ====
The Gharibwal Cement Works Railway opened in May 1886 as a 27 kilometres (17 mi) 1,676 mm (5 ft 6 in) railway from Haranpur Junction to Gharibwal. It was built to serve the Gharibwal quarry.

=== Malakwal–Bhera Railway ===
- Malakwal Junction–Bhera via Miani, Hazurpur

== Personnel ==
No staff records are available at the British Library IOR. The following personnel have been identified from various sources as being posted to this railway:

- James Ramsay, Executive Engineer from the Public Works Department(PWD) was Engineer-in-Chief of the Sind–Sagar Railwayin early 1880s. He was also Engineer-in-Chief of the Chak-Nizam Bridge that was completed in 1887.
- Frederick Robert Upcott, was Engineer-in-Charge of the Chak-Nizam Bridge as part of the Sind–Sagar Railway that was completed in 1887. The account also adds Mr Boydell, Executive Engineer and Mr J Spence, Sub-Engineer
- Francis Langford O'Callaghan, 1884–85, posted from State Railways as Chief Engineer, Survey of the Sind–Sagar Railway.
- Trevredyn Rashleigh Wynne, c.1884, Executive Engineer posted from PWD for 'short stint' to Sind–Sagar Railway.

== See also ==
- History of rail transport in Pakistan
- Scinde, Punjab & Delhi Railway
- North Western State Railway
- Pakistan Railways
