= Rakh Rajar railway station =

Railway station in Pakistan

Coordinates: 32.401384°N 72.483753°E

Rakh Rajar Railway Station رکھ راجڑ ریلوے اسٹیشن

General information
- Owner: Ministry of Railways
- Line: Malakwal–Khushab Branch Line

Other information
- Station code: RAR

Services
Preceding station	Pakistan Railways	Following station
Dhak towards Malakwal Junction	Malakwal–Khushab Branch Line	Khushab Junction Terminus
Location

Rakh Rajar Railway Station (Urdu: رکھ راجڑ ریلوے اسٹیشن) is located in Pakistan.

== See also ==
- List of railway stations in Pakistan
- Pakistan Railways
