= Sodian Gujar railway station =

Railway station in Pakistan

Sodian Gujar Railway Station سوڈی گجر ریلوے اسٹیشن

General information
- Coordinates: 32.3723°N 73.0612°E
- Owner: Ministry of Railways
- Line: Dandot Light Railway

Other information
- Station code: KWA

Services
Preceding station	Pakistan Railways	Following station
Khewra towards Dandot	Dandot Light Railway	Chalisa Junction Terminus
Location

Sodian Gujar Railway Station (Urdu: سوڈی گجر اسٹیشن) is a railway station located in Sodian Gujar village of Jhelum District in Punjab, Pakistan.

== See also ==
- List of railway stations in Pakistan
- Pakistan Railways
