= Chalisa Junction railway station =

Railway station in Pakistan

Chalisa Junction Station چالیسا جنکشن ریلوے اسٹیشن
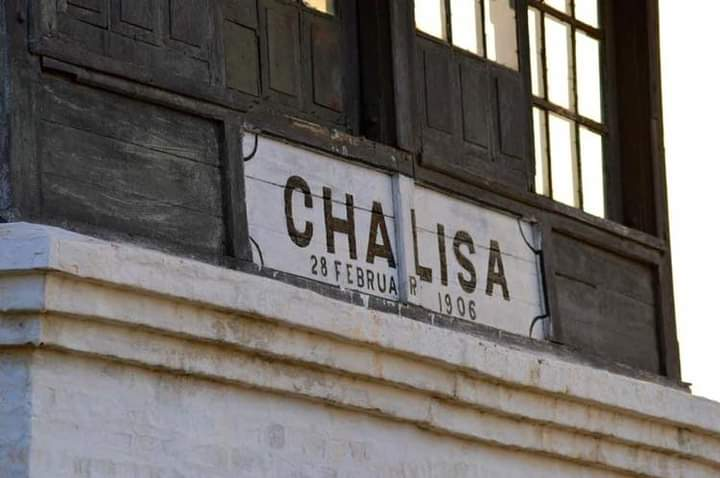

General information
- Coordinates: 32.6045°N 73.1077°E
- Owner: Ministry of Railways
- Lines: Malakwal–Khushab Branch Line; Dandot Light Railway

Other information
- Station code: CHS

Services
Preceding station	Pakistan Railways	Following station
Haranpur Junction towards Malakwal Junction	Malakwal–Khushab Branch Line	Pind Dadan Khan towards Khushab Junction
Sodian Gujar towards Dandot	Dandot Light Railway	Terminus
Location

Chalisa Junction Railway Station (Urdu: چالیسا جنکشن ریلوے اسٹیشن) is located in Pind Dadan Khan Tehsil of Jhelum District in the Punjab Province of Pakistan.

== Gallery ==
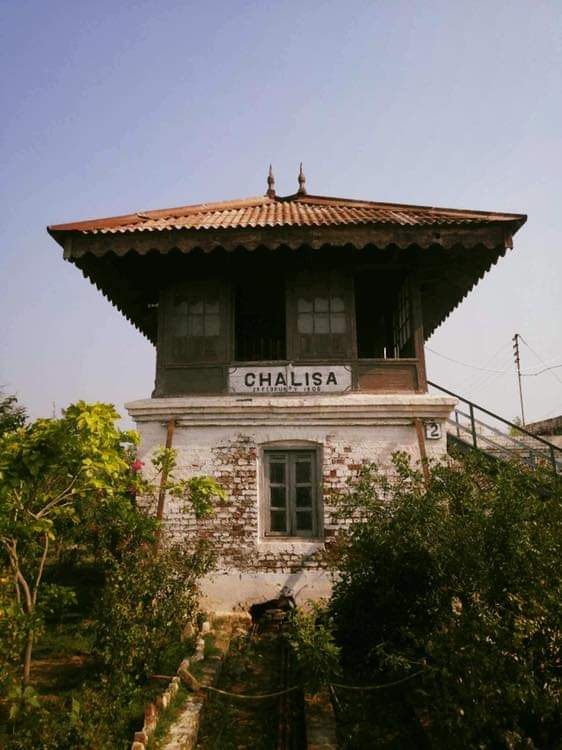

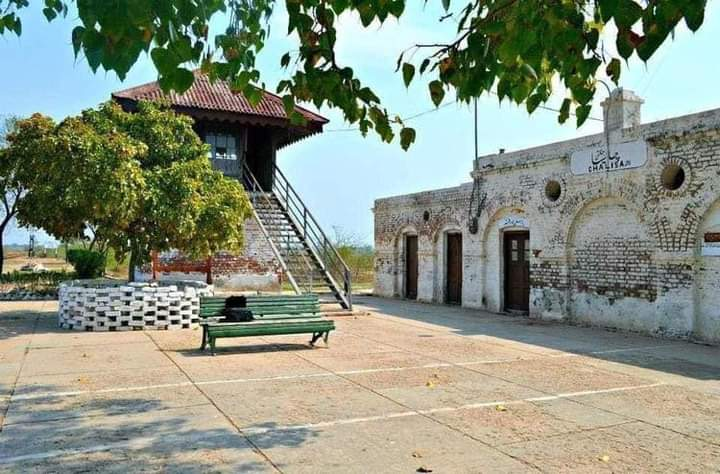

== See also ==
- List of railway stations in Pakistan
- Pakistan Railways
