= Miani railway station =

Railway station in Pakistan

Coordinates: 32°31′N 73°04′E

Miani Station میانی اسٹیشن

General information
- Owner: Ministry of Railways
- Line: Malakwal–Bhera Railway

Other information
- Station code: MII

Services
Preceding station	Pakistan Railways	Following station
Malakwal Junction Terminus	Malakwal–Bhera Railway	Hazurpur towards Bhera
Location

Miani railway station (Urdu: میانی ریلوے اسٹیشن) is located in Pakistan.

== See also ==
- List of railway stations in Pakistan
- Pakistan Railways
