= Dandot Light Railway =

Closed railway line in Pakistan

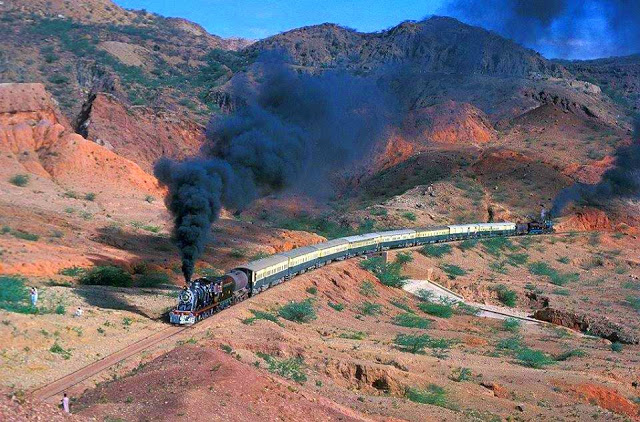

Overview
- Native name: ڈ نڈ وت ریلوے
- Status: Operational
- Owner: Pakistan Railways
- Termini: Dandot RS; Chalisa Junction

Service
- Operator(s): Pakistan Railways

History
- Opened: 1905

Technical
- Line length: 10 km (6.2 mi)

Dandot Light Railway (Urdu: ڈ نڈ وت ریلوے) is one of several branch lines in Pakistan, operated and maintained by Pakistan Railways. The line began at Dandot railway station and ended at Chalisa Junction. The total length of this railway line is 10 kilometers (6.2 mi) with 4 railway stations. Currently, only coal trains are running till ICI Factory.

== History ==
The Dandot Light Railway was a 10 kilometres (6.2 mi) 610 mm (2 ft) narrow gauge railway which opened in 1905 and extended from Dandot railway station to Chalisa Junction railway station. It was built to serve the Khewra Salt Mine.

== Stations ==
- Dandot (Abandoned)
- Khewra (Abandoned)
- Sodian Gujar (Abandoned)
- Chalisa Junction

== See also ==
- Samasata-Amruka Branch Line
- Karachi–Peshawar Railway Line
- Railway lines in Pakistan
