= Lilla, Jhelum =

Town in Jhelum District, Punjab, Pakistan

Lilla, Jhelum Lilla Shareef
- Village and union council
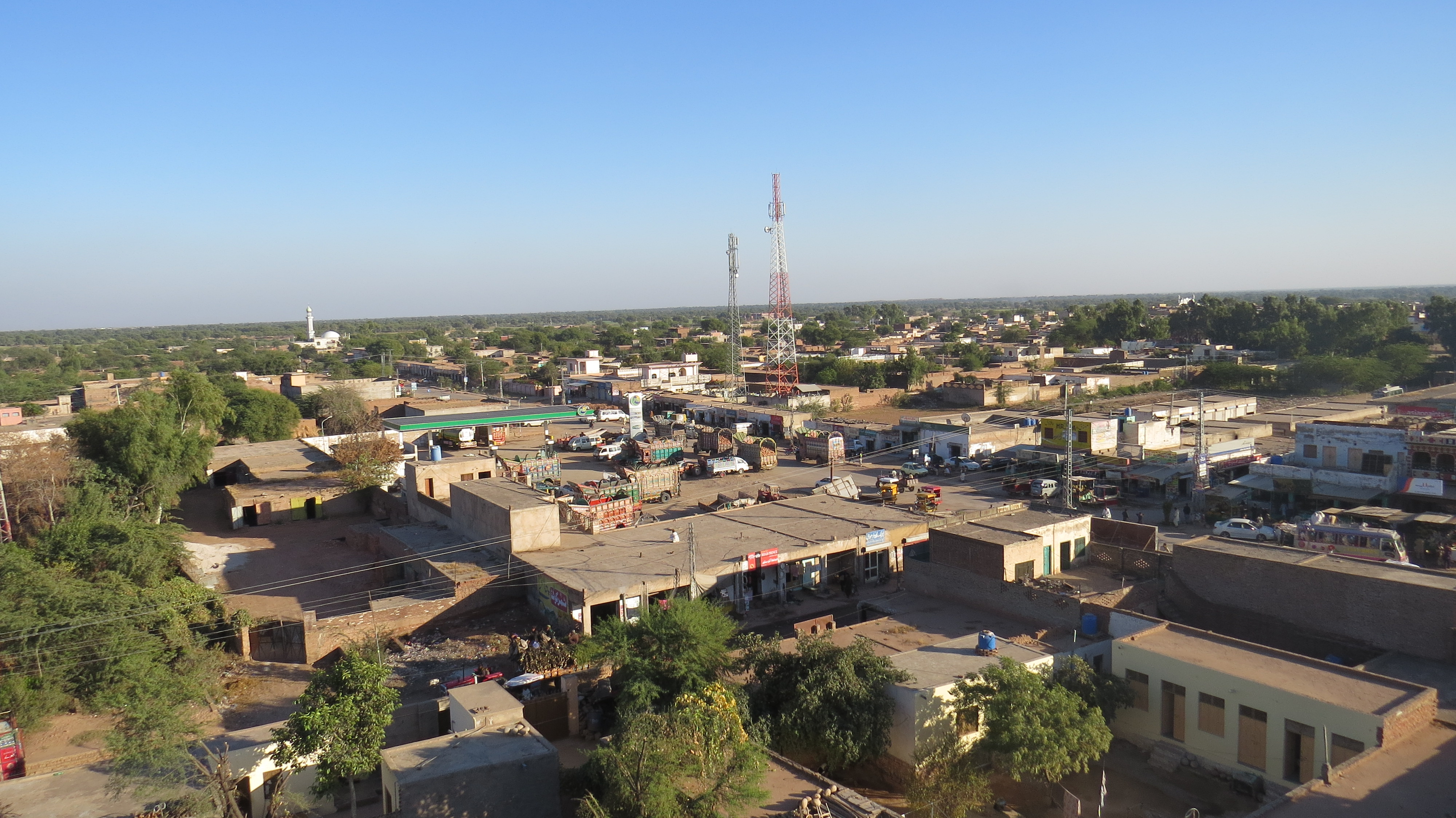
- Interactive map of Lilla, Jhelum
- Country: Pakistan
- Region: Punjab Province
- District: Jhelum District
- Tehsil: Pind Dadan Khan

Government
  - Type: Federal Republic

Population (2017 Pakistani census)
  - Total: 59,135
- Time zone: UTC+5 (PST)
- Pakistan Postal: 49020
- Area code: 0092 544
- Website: https://www.urduarticles.pk

(للہ) is a small city and union council of Jhelum District in the Punjab Province of Pakistan. It is part of Pind Dadan Khan Tehsil.

The village is 220 metres (720 feet) above sea level and is located in central Punjab. Lilla is also known as Lilla Town and Lilla Shareef. Lilla has four small parts: Lilla Bherwana, Lilla Bhera, Lilla Hindwana and Lilla Gujj.

Lilla is famous for the shrine of Hazrat Alla Lillahi, a revered Sufi saint associated with the Naqshbandi spiritual order. The shrine has been a significant center of spiritual activity and pilgrimage for over 200 years.

== Independence ==
Ahead of the partition of India in 1947, the predominantly Muslim population supported the All India Muslim League and the Pakistan Movement. After the independence of Pakistan in 1947, the minority Hindus and Sikhs migrated to India while many Muslim refugees from India settled in Lilla and nearby areas.

== Location ==
Lilla is located 163 kilometres (101 miles) southwest of Islamabad, in Jhelum District. It lies about two miles away from the M-2 motorway, which connects Lahore and Islamabad. It is connected to the M-2 by the Lilla Interchange. Lilla is roughly 30 km (19 mi) from Pind Dadan Khan and 116 km (72 mi) from Jhelum. Directly connected by the M-2 motorway are Lahore, Islamabad, and the route to Khusab, Joharabad, Chakwal and Sargodha.

== Topography ==
Lilla mainly comprises flat, fertile plains, although here are a high hills on the Peer Khara and Kallar Kahar Road. The River Jhelum flows on the western and northern sides. The city is located 220 metres (720 feet) above sea level.

== Climate ==
The village has a climate of extreme heat in the summers and moderate cold in the winters. The maximum temperature reaches 50 °C (122 °F) in the summer while the minimum temperature recorded is as low as 0 °C (32 °F) in the winter.

The average annual rainfall is 1,200 mm (47 in), most of which falls in the summer monsoon season. However, westerly disturbances also bring quite significant rainfall in the winter. In summer, the record maximum temperature was 48.4 °C (119 °F) in June 1954, and the lowest minimum recorded temperature was −3.9 °C (25 °F) on several occasions, most recently in January 1967.

The biggest floods in Jhelum in recent years were in 1992. Jhelum city and surrounding areas were almost completely submerged under flood waters.

Climate data for Lilla Town
Month	Jan	Feb	Mar	Apr	May	Jun	Jul	Aug	Sep	Oct	Nov	Dec	Year
Mean daily maximum °C (°F)	17.0 (62.6)	19.5 (67.1)	24.2 (75.6)	29.9 (85.8)	35.4 (95.7)	39.5 (103.1)	35.8 (96.4)	33.7 (92.7)	33.6 (92.5)	30.9 (87.6)	25.0 (77.0)	19.3 (66.7)	28.7 (83.6)
Daily mean °C (°F)	9.8 (49.6)	12.5 (54.5)	17.3 (63.1)	22.6 (72.7)	27.6 (81.7)	32.0 (89.6)	30.3 (86.5)	28.6 (83.5)	27.6 (81.7)	22.7 (72.9)	16.2 (61.2)	11.3 (52.3)	21.5 (70.8)
Mean daily minimum °C (°F)	2.7 (36.9)	5.5 (41.9)	10.4 (50.7)	15.3 (59.5)	19.9 (67.8)	24.5 (76.1)	24.8 (76.6)	23.6 (74.5)	21.6 (70.9)	14.5 (58.1)	7.5 (45.5)	3.3 (37.9)	14.5 (58.0)
Average precipitation mm (inches)	58 (2.3)	56 (2.2)	68 (2.7)	44 (1.7)	38 (1.5)	37 (1.5)	237 (9.3)	236 (9.3)	92 (3.6)	23 (0.9)	16 (0.6)	—	—

== Demographics ==
The majority of the people in the village speak Punjabi.

== Historical places ==
- Darbar Peer Hazrat Lillahi
- Peer Khara
- Kakiya Wali Sarkar
- Miana khoh
- Darbar Hazrat Khawja Faiz Bakhsh Chishti Nizami

== Sites ==
=== Mosques ===
There are four main mosques and about 30 small mosques in the city.

=== Schools ===
- Govt Higher Secondary School
- Govt girls high school
- Al Ghazali High School
- Dar-e-Arqam Schools
- The Sufa Grammar

=== Madrasa and darbars ===
- Astana Aliya Chistia Nizamia Sulemania
- Darbar Hazrat Khawja Faiz Bakhsh Chishti Nizami R.A
- Astaniya Aliya Lilla Shareef Madrasa
- Darbar Peer Hazrat Lillahi R.A
- Darbar Sindhan Badshah R.A
- Darbar Bawa Sakhi Gulam Sarwar Qadri R.A
- Darbar Peer Khara Sharif
- Mazaar Sharif Majzob Hazrat Qaim deen Bra dar e Akbar Alla hazrat
- Mazaar Sharif Qazi Hassan Deen
- Mazaar sharif badshah bukhari lilla behra

== Transportation ==
Lilla is about 5 kilometres (3.1 miles) from the M-2 motorway which connects Lahore and Islamabad. It is also connected to other cities including Pind Dadan Khan, Jhelum, Chakwal, Khushab, Sargodha and Mianwali by a highway. Bus services drive regular routes from Lilla to the rest of the country.

Lilla is also connected with the rest of the country by rail.

== Notable people ==
- Khalid Masud, Islamic Scholar by profession Chemical Engineer
