= Hazurpur railway station =

Railway station in Pakistan

Hazurpur Station حضورپور ریلوے اسٹیشن

General information
- Owner: Ministry of Railways
- Line: Malakwal–Bhera Railway

Other information
- Station code: HZP

Services
Preceding station	Pakistan Railways	Following station
Miani towards Malakwal Junction	Malakwal–Bhera Railway	Bhera Terminus
Location

Hazurpur railway station (Urdu: حضورپور ریلوے اسٹیشن) is located in Pakistan.

== See also ==
- List of railway stations in Pakistan
- Pakistan Railways
