= Gharibwal =

Gharibwal غریب وال
- Village
- Country: Pakistan
- Region: Punjab Province
- District: Jhelum District
- Time zone: UTC+5 (PST)

Gharibwal (Urdu: غریب وال, romanized: Gharīb Vāl) is a village that is a part of the Pind Dadan Khan Tehsil of Jhelum District in the Pakistani province of Punjab. It is located between the Khewra Salt Mines, Asia's largest salt mine, and the Jhelum River near Gharibwal Cement Factory.

== Supposed tomb of Ham ==
In the first century, Romano-Jewish historian Josephus asserted that Noah's son Ham and his descendants had populated parts of Africa and Asia. In 1891, Hāfiz Shams ad-Dīn of Gulyana claimed that he had a dream in which he was informed of the location of Ham's grave, who died at the age of 536. He subsequently established the present tomb in Gharibwal which is 78-foot long. However, many historians have dismissed this as mere rumour and unsupported.
