= Gharibwal railway station =

Railway station in Gharibwal, Pakistan

Coordinates: 32°42′N 73°11′E

Gharibwal Railway Station غریب وال ریلوے اسٹیشن

General information
- Owner: Ministry of Railways
- Lines: Gharibwal Cement Works Railway via Malakwal–Khushab Branch Line

Other information
- Station code: GBW

Services
Preceding station	Pakistan Railways	Following station
Haranpur Junction Terminus	Gharibwal Cement Works	Terminus
Location

Gharibwal Railway Station (Urdu: غریب وال ریلوے اسٹیشن) is located at Gharibwal in Pakistan.

== See also ==
- List of railway stations in Pakistan
- Pakistan Railways
