= Bhera railway station =

Former railway station in Punjab, Pakistan

Bhera Station بھیرا اسٹیشن

General information
- Owner: Ministry of Railways
- Line: Malakwal–Bhera Railway

Other information
- Station code: BHH

Services
Preceding station	Pakistan Railways	Following station
Hazurpur towards Malakwal Junction	Malakwal–Bhera Railway	Terminus
Location

Bhera railway station (Urdu: بھیرا ریلوے اسٹیشن) is a defunct railway station located in Bhera, Pakistan.

== History ==
The foundation of Bhera railway station was laid in 1881 during the British Raj. During the operational period, a train used to run between Bhera and Malakwal Junction railway station.

In 2005, Pakistan Railways closed the station due to lack of profitability.

Renovation and Rehabilitation Work started on the building in 2026.

== See also ==
- List of railway stations in Pakistan
- Pakistan Railways
