= Sandral railway station =

Railway station in Pakistan

General information
- Owner: Ministry of Railways

Other information
- Station code: SNRL

History
- Former names: Great Indian Peninsula Railway

Sandral railway station (Urdu: ساندرل ریلوے اسٹیشن) is located in Pakistan.The Sandral is a small village of District Khushab in Punjab, Pakistan.

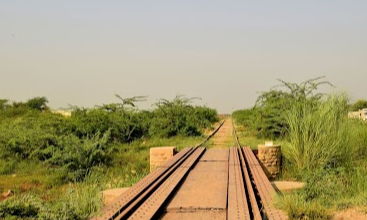
Sandral railway Track station

== See also ==
- List of railway stations in Pakistan
- Pakistan Railways
