= Dandot railway station =

Railway station in Punjab, Pakistan

Dandot Railway Station ڈنڈوٹ ریلوے اسٹیشن
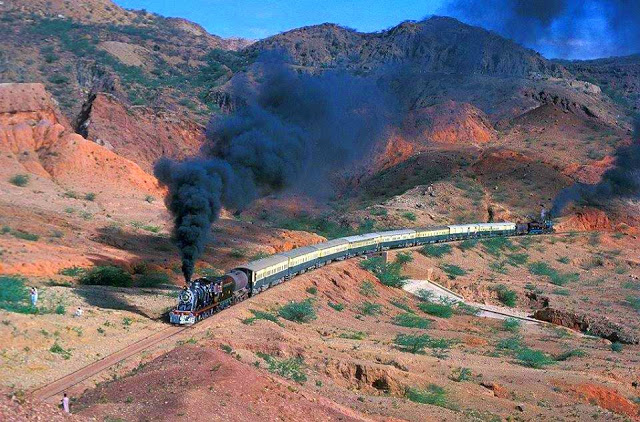

General information
- Coordinates: 32.6392°N 72.9819°E
- Owner: Ministry of Railways
- Line: Dandot Light Railway

Other information
- Station code: DRS

Services
Preceding station	Pakistan Railways	Following station
Terminus	Dandot Light Railway	Khewra towards Chalisa Junction
Location

Dandot Railway Station (Urdu: ڈنڈوٹ ریلوے اسٹیشن) is located in Dandot RS (Shireen Abad) village, Pind Dadan Khan Tehsil, in the Jhelum District of Punjab province, Pakistan.

== See also ==
- List of railway stations in Pakistan
- Pakistan Railways
