= Khewra, Jhelum =

Khewra کھیوڑہ
- city
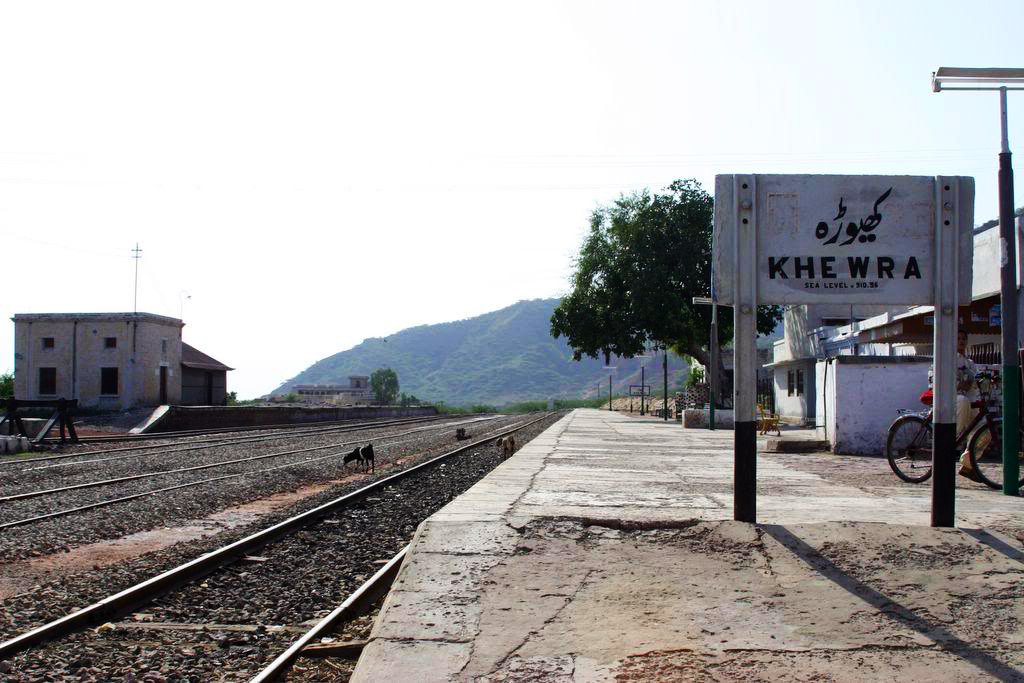
- Khewra - Kohistan-e-Namak

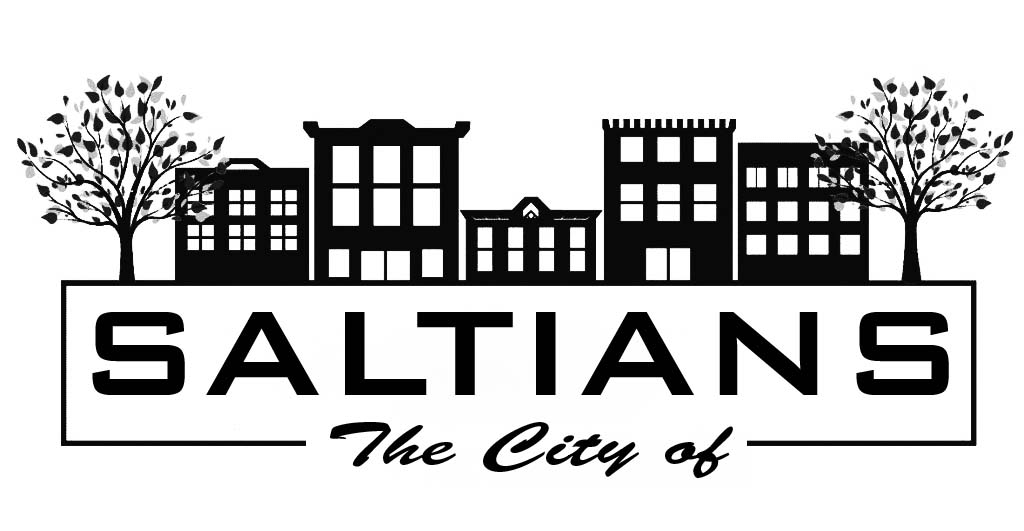
- Seal
- Nicknames: Kingdom of Salt, The City of SALTIANS, A Land of Peace
- Motto: To Spread the Message of Peace
- Location within Punjab, Pakistan Location within Pakistan
- Coordinates: 32°38′52.58″N 73°00′30.22″E
- Country: Pakistan
- Region: Punjab
- District: Jhelum
- Tehsil: Pind Dadan Khan
- Tourist attraction: Khewra Salt Mine
- Founded: 14 March 1876
- Subdivisions: List: 22 Wards; 30 Maher (Gang-men)

Government
  - Tribal Chief: Muhammad Sufyan
  - Chairman: Maher Farooq Hussnain Nazar (UC-I)
  - Chairman: Maher Jaffar Ali Jaffri (UC-II)
  - Founder of Khewra Salt Mine: Great Alexander
  - Tribes: Paracha, Awan, Janjua Rajput, Khokhar, Mirza, Malik, Jotania, Phaphra, Mughal
- Elevation: 277.48 m (910.4 ft)

Population
  - Total: 80,000
- Demonym: Saltian
- Time zone: UTC+5 (PST)
- Postal Code: 49060
- Area code: 0544
- Website: www.khewra.webs.com

Khewra (Punjabi / Urdu: کھیوڑہ) is the second most populated city of Jhelum District and a neighboring city of Pind Dadan Khan in Jhelum District, Punjab, Pakistan. The city is administratively subdivided into two union councils and is the location of the Khewra Salt Mine. The population of Khewra city is about 35,000 (or 80,000).

Khewra city is also known as "The Kingdom of Salt" because of its rock salt which is 98% pure and natural source of salt in Pakistan. Khewra Salt Mine is the second largest salt mine in the world, after Sifto Salt Mines in Ontario, Canada.

== Tourism ==
Khewra city was established in 1876 with the support of the British Army who occupied the land of Khewra prior to 1947. Janjua Rajputs tribe was the founder of Khewra.

Khewra Salt Mine was reopened in 1872 by a local family of Janjua Rajputs, after the British had wrested control from the Sikhs. Since 2002, the main tunnel of the mine has been converted into a tourist attraction. Some websites claim 35000-40000 visitors come here every year. In 2003 a major restoration work was carried out at the mines to make it a tourist destination. Decorative light-work was done and some of the salt crystals found here are translucent, meaning while it absorbs some light, some light pasts through them. Depending upon the thickness (among other properties), the salt rock glows when lit in many different shades. The tourist attractions inside the mine include Assembly Hall, Pul-saraat, indoor brine ponds, Badshahi Mosque, Sheesh Mahal, Crystal Valley, Minar-E-Pakistan, Narrow Gauge Electric Railway, Pakistan Post Office, salt crystal formations and old mining machinery.

The valley is almost entirely populated by the Khewra's community in between high mountains.

Metha Patan Valley is a destination for trekking and hill walking. Metha Patan has a natural waterfall which provides sufficient water to Khewra City. It attracts tourists because of its natural environment. Metha Patan Valley has a potential for mountaineering and rock climbing.
