= Khewra Salt Mine =

Salt mine in Khewra, Pakistan

Khewra Salt
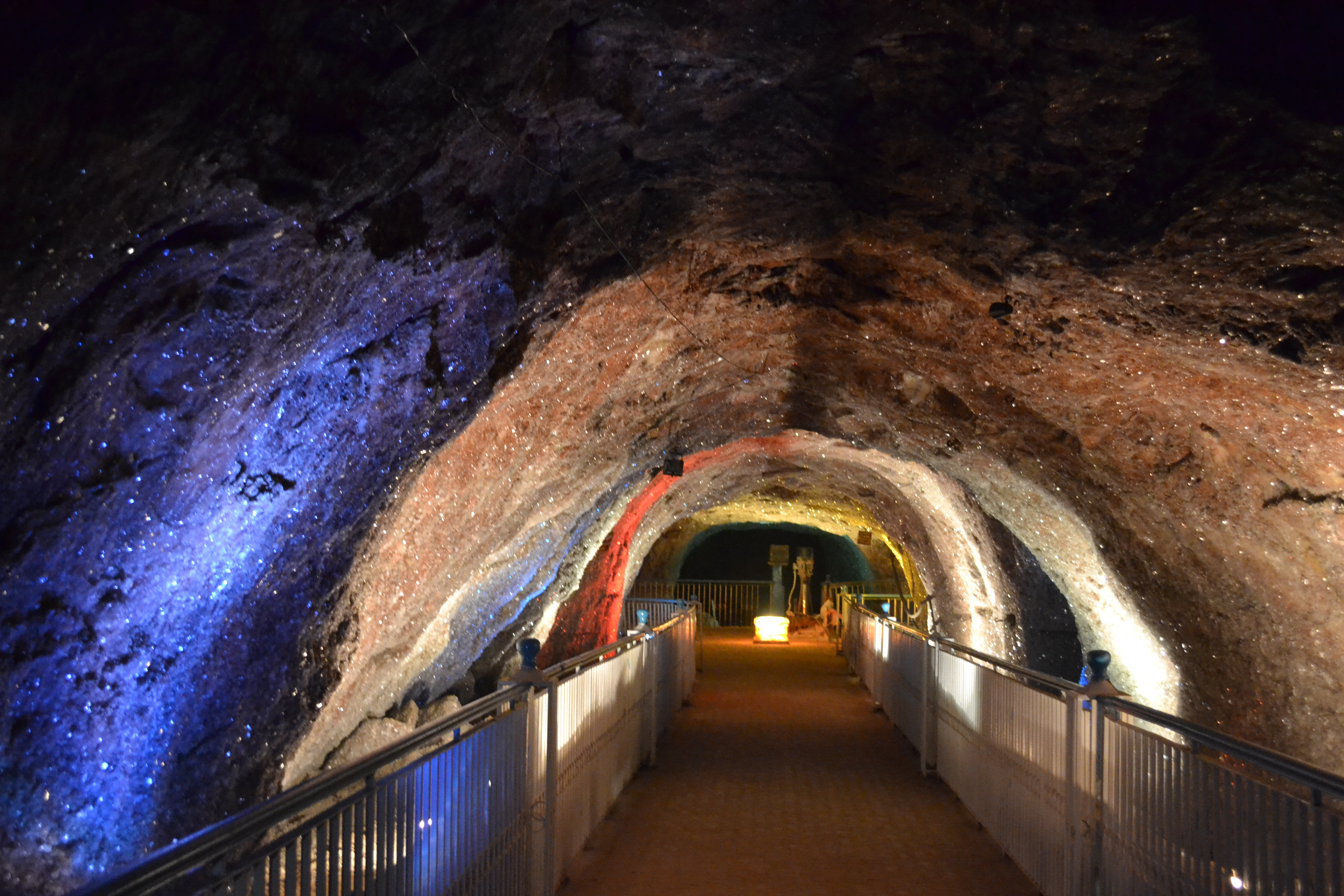
- Khewra Salt Mine tunnel (Crystal Valley)

- Location within Punjab, Pakistan Location within Pakistan
- Location: Khewra, Pakistan, Punjab; 32°38′52.58″N 73°00′30.22″E
- Products: Rock salt
- Production: 350,000 MT
- Financial year: 2019–20
- Opened: 1872
- Active: 150 years
- Company: Pakistan Mineral Development Corporation
- Website: www.pmdc.gov.pk/mines

The Khewra Salt Mine (Urdu: کھیوڑہ نمک کان), also known as Mayo Salt Mine, is the world's second largest salt mine, located in Khewra in the Jhelum District of Punjab, Pakistan. The mine is in the Salt Range of the Pothohar Plateau, which rises from the Indus Plain of the Punjab.

The mine is famous for its production of pink Khewra salt, often marketed as Himalayan salt, and is a major tourist attraction, drawing up to 250,000 visitors a year. Its history dates back to its discovery by Alexander's troops in 326 BC, but it started trading in the Mughal era. The main tunnel at ground level was developed by H. Warth, a mining engineer, in 1872 during British rule. After independence, the BMR took possession until 1956 and then Pakistan Industrial Development Corporation (PIDC) owned the mines till 1965. After the India-Pakistan war in 1965, the West Pakistan Industrial Development Corporation (WPIDC) took over the administration of salt mines and in 1974, the Pakistan Mineral Development Corporation took over the mine, which still remains the largest source of salt in the country, producing more than 350,000 tons per annum of about 99% pure halite. Estimates of the reserves of salt in the mine vary from 82 million tons to 600 million tons.

== Geology ==
The Khewra Salt Mine is excavated within the base of a thick layer of highly folded, faulted, and stretched Ediacaran to early Cambrian evaporites of the Salt Range Formation. This geological formation consists of a basal layer of crystalline halite, which is intercalated with potash salts. This basal layer is overlain by gypsiferous marl, which is covered by interlayered beds of gypsum and dolomite with infrequent seams of oil shale. These strata are overlain by 200 to 500 meters (660 to 1,640 ft) of Neoproterozoic to Eocene sedimentary rocks that have been uplifted and eroded along with the Salt Range Formation to create the Salt Range at the southern edge of the Pothohar Plateau. The Ediacaran to early Cambrian evaporites of the Salt Range Formation have been thrust southward over Neoproterozoic to Eocene sedimentary rocks by many kilometers, which tectonically incorporated fragments of the underlying younger strata within these evaporites. The Salt Range is the southern edge of a well-described fold-and-thrust belt, which underlies the entire Pothohar Plateau and developed south of the Himalayas as a result of the ongoing collision between India and Eurasia.

Palynomorphs (organic microfossils) have been used to make inferences about the ages of the Salt Range Formation and its salt layers that are exposed within the Khewra Salt Mine. For example, while working with Geological Survey of India in the 1930s and 1940s, Birbal Sahni reported finding evidence of angiosperms, gymnosperms, and insects inside the mine which he regarded as originating from the Eocene period. However, on the basis of additional geologic data, later research has concluded that these palynomorphs were contaminants.

== History ==
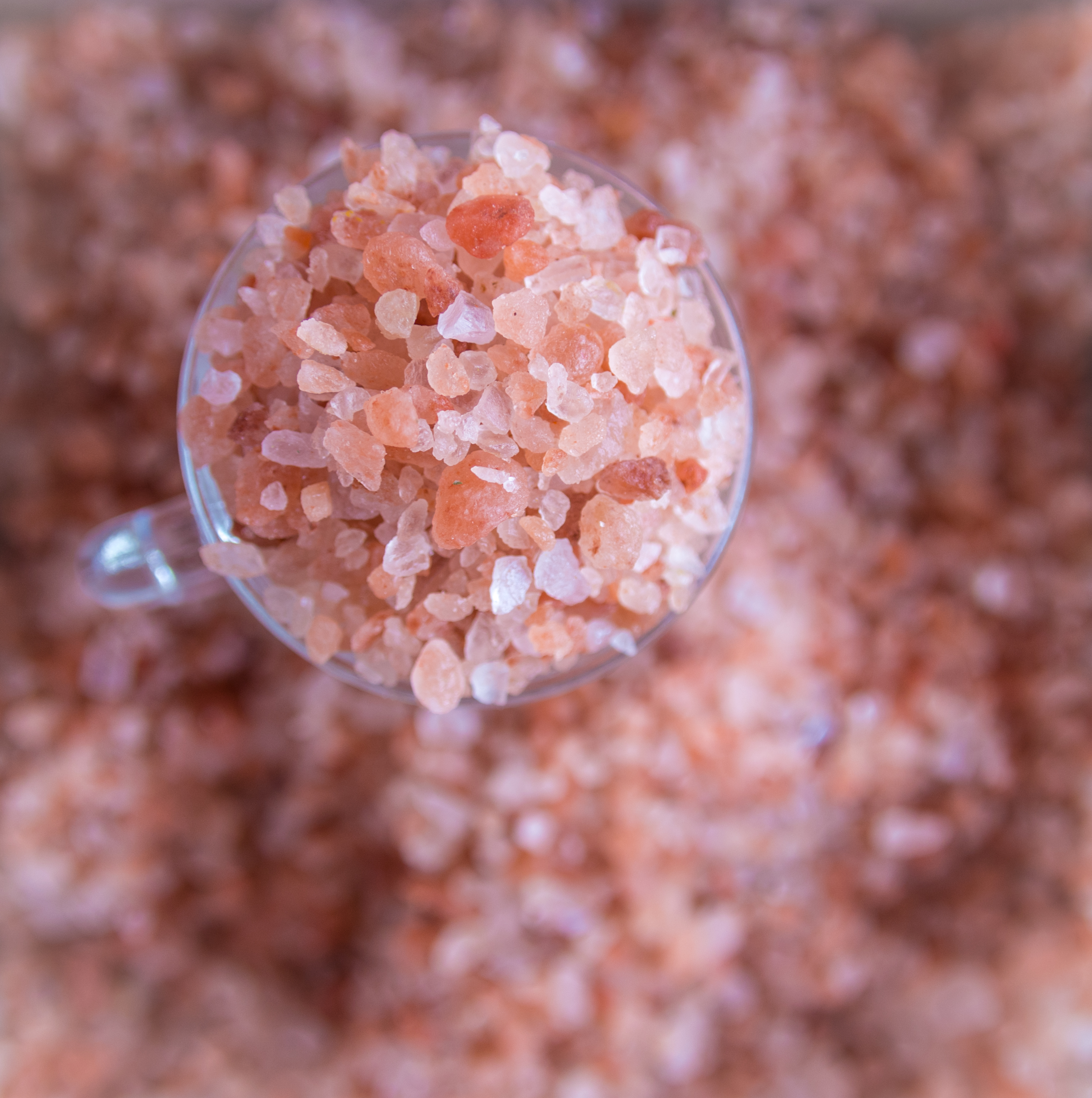
The mine is famous for its production of pink Khewra salt.

The Khewra Salt Mine is also known as Mayo Salt Mine, in honour of Lord Mayo, who visited it as Viceroy of India. The salt reserves at Khewra were discovered when Alexander the Great crossed the Jhelum and Mianwali region during his Indian campaign. The mine was discovered, however, not by Alexander, nor by his allies, but by his army's horses, when they were found licking the stones. Ailing horses of his army also recovered after licking the rock salt stones. During the Mughal era the salt was traded in various markets, as far away as Central Asia. On the downfall of the Mughal empire, the mine was taken over by Sikhs. Hari Singh Nalwa, the Sikh Commander-in-Chief, shared the management of the Salt Range with Gulab Singh, the Raja of Jammu. The former controlled the Warcha mine, while the latter held Khewra. The salt quarried during Sikh rule was both eaten and used as a source of revenue.

In 1872, some time after they had taken over the Sikhs' territory, the British developed the mine further. They found the mining to have been inefficient, with irregular and narrow tunnels and entrances that made the movement of labourers difficult and dangerous. The supply of water inside the mine was poor, and there was no storage facility for the mined salt. The only road to the mine was over difficult, rocky terrain. To address these problems the government levelled the road, built warehouses, provided a water supply, improved the entrances and tunnels, and introduced a better mechanism for excavation of salt. Penalties were introduced to control salt smuggling.

== Location ==
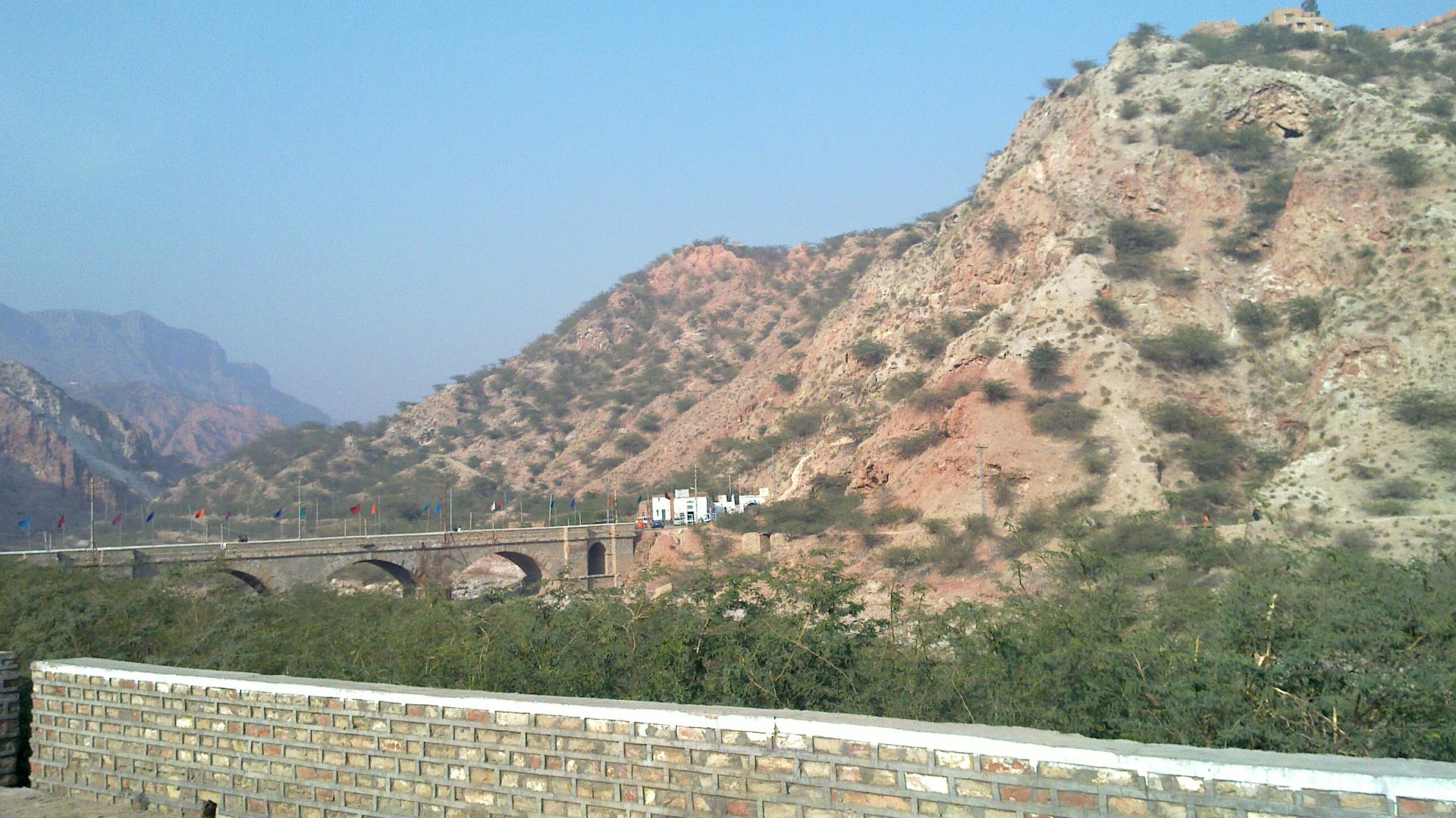
Entrance to the mine

Khewra Salt Mine is in Pind Dadan Khan Tehsil of Jhelum District. About 160 km (99 mi) from Islamabad and Lahore, it is accessed via the M-2 Motorway, about 30 kilometres (19 miles) off the Lilla interchange while going towards Pind Dadan Khan on the Lilla road. The mine is in mountains that are part of a salt range, a mineral-rich mountain system extending about 200 km from the Jhelum River south of Pothohar Plateau to the Indus River near Kalabagh. Khewra mine is about 288 meters (945 feet) above sea level and about 730 meters (2,400 feet) into the mountain from the mine entrance. The underground mine covers an area of 110 km^{2} (42 sq mi).

== Production ==
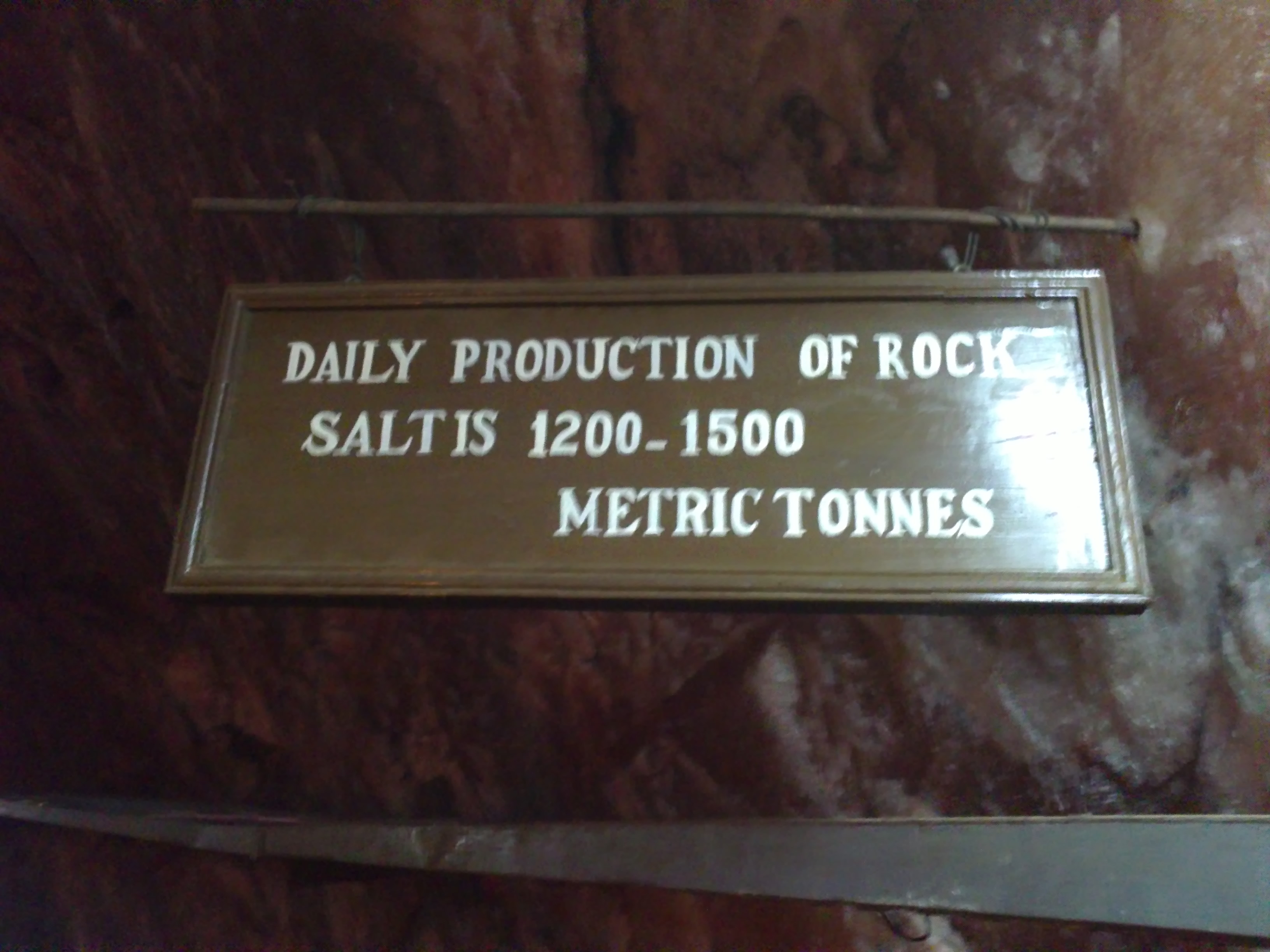
Display of daily salt production

Estimates of the total reserves of salt in the mines range from 82 million tons to over 600 million tons. In raw form it contains negligible amounts of Calcium, Magnesium, Potassium sulfates, and moisture; it also contains iron, zinc, copper, manganese, chromium, and lead as trace elements. Salt from Khewra, also known as Khewra salt, is red, pink, off-white or transparent. In the early years of British rule, the Khewra mine produced about 28,000 to 30,000 tons per annum; it increased to about 187,400 tons per annum for the five fiscal years ending 1946–47 and to 136,824 tons for the two years ending 1949–50 with the systematic working introduced by H. Warth. The mine's output was reported in 2003 to be 385,000 tons of salt per annum, which amounts to almost half of Pakistan's total production of rock salt. At that rate of output, the tunnel would be expected to last for another 350 years.

The mine comprises nineteen stories, of which eleven are below ground. From the entrance, the mine extends about 730 meters (2,400 feet) into the mountains, and the total length of its tunnels is about 40 km (25 mi). Quarrying is done using the room and pillar method, mining only half of the salt and leaving the remaining half to support what is above. The temperature inside the mine remains about 18–20 °C (64–68 °F) throughout the year. The 2 ft (610 mm) narrow gauge Khewra Salt Mines Railway track laid during the British era is used to bring salt out of the mine in rail cars.

Khewra salt is Pakistan's best known rock salt. It is used for cooking, as bath salt, as brine and as a raw material for many industries, including a soda ash plant set up by AkzoNobel in 1940. Salt from Khewra mine is also used to make decorative items like lamps, vases, ashtrays and statues, which are exported to the United States, India and many European countries. The use of rock salt to make artistic and decorative items started during the Mughal era, when many craftsman made tableware and decorations from it. Warth introduced the use of a lathe to cut out art pieces from the rock salt, as he found it similar to gypsum in physical characteristics.

In 2008 the Government of Pakistan decided to sell off seventeen profitable organisations including Khewra salt mines, but the plan was shelved. The mine is now operated by the Pakistan Mineral Development Corporation, a government department.

== Tourism ==
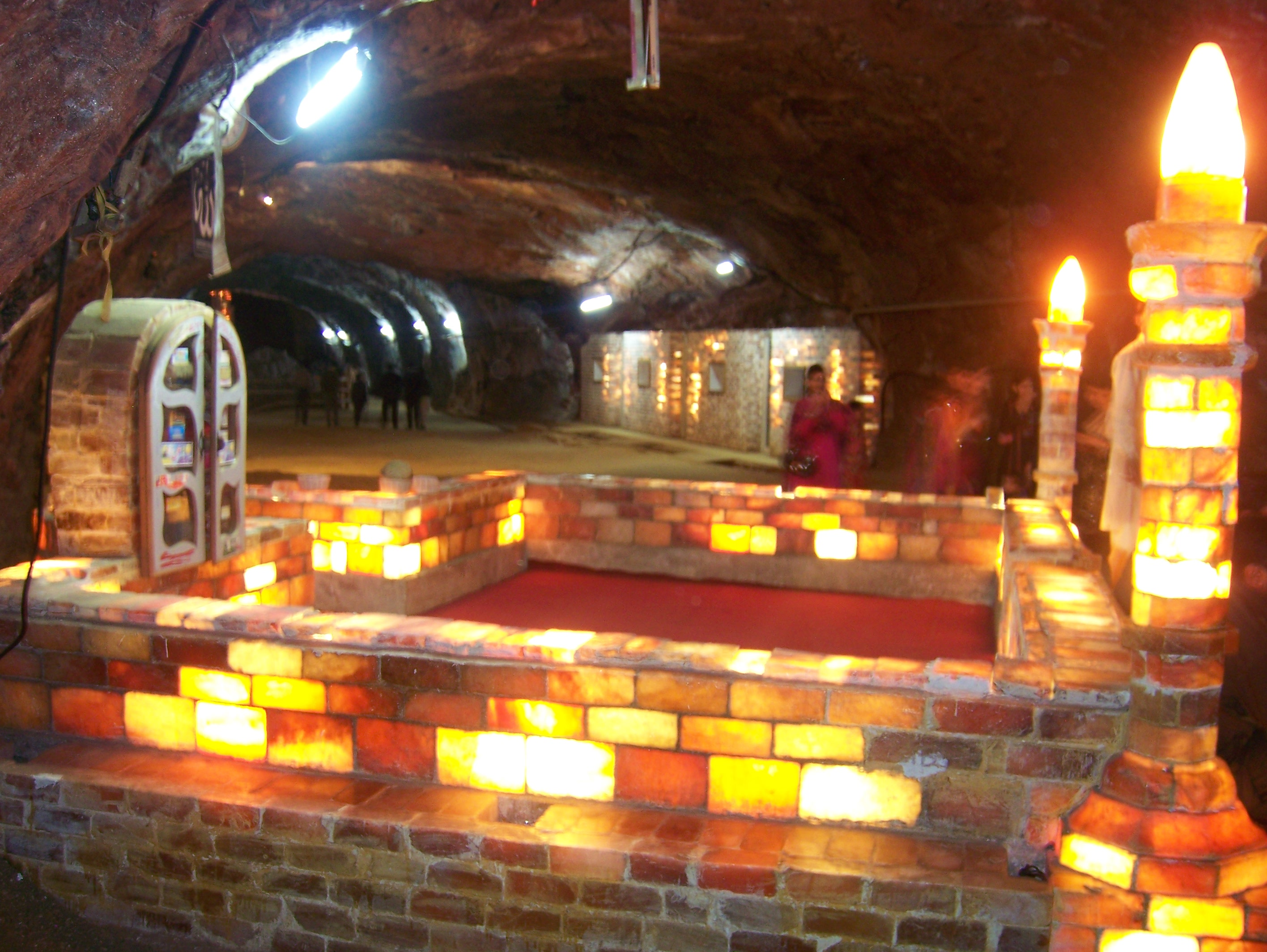
A small Masjid made of salt bricks inside the Khewra salt mine complex

Khewra Salt Mine is a major tourist attraction, with around 250,000 visitors a year, earning it considerable revenue. Visitors are taken into the mine on the Khewra Salt Mines Railway. There are numerous pools of salty water inside. The Badshahi Masjid was built in the mining tunnels with multi-coloured salt bricks about fifty years ago. Other artistic carvings in the mine include a replica of Minar-e-Pakistan, a statue of Allama Iqbal, an accumulation of crystals that forms the name of Muhammad in Urdu script, a model of the Great Wall of China and another of the Mall Road of Murree. In 2003 two phases of development of tourist facilities and attractions were carried out, at a total cost of 9 million rupees. A clinical ward with 20 beds was established in 2007, costing 10 million rupees, for the treatment of asthma and other respiratory diseases using salt therapy. The "Visit Pakistan Year 2007" event included a train safari visit of Khewra Salt Mine. In February 2011 Pakistan Railways started operating special trains for tourists from Lahore and Rawalpindi to Khewra. For this purpose the railway station of Khewra was refurbished with the help of a private firm.

Other visitor attractions in the mine include the 75-meter-high (245-foot-high) Assembly Hall; Pul-Saraat, a salt bridge with no pillars over a 25-meter-deep (80-foot-deep) brine pond; Sheesh Mahal (Palace of Mirrors), where salt crystals are light pink; and a café.

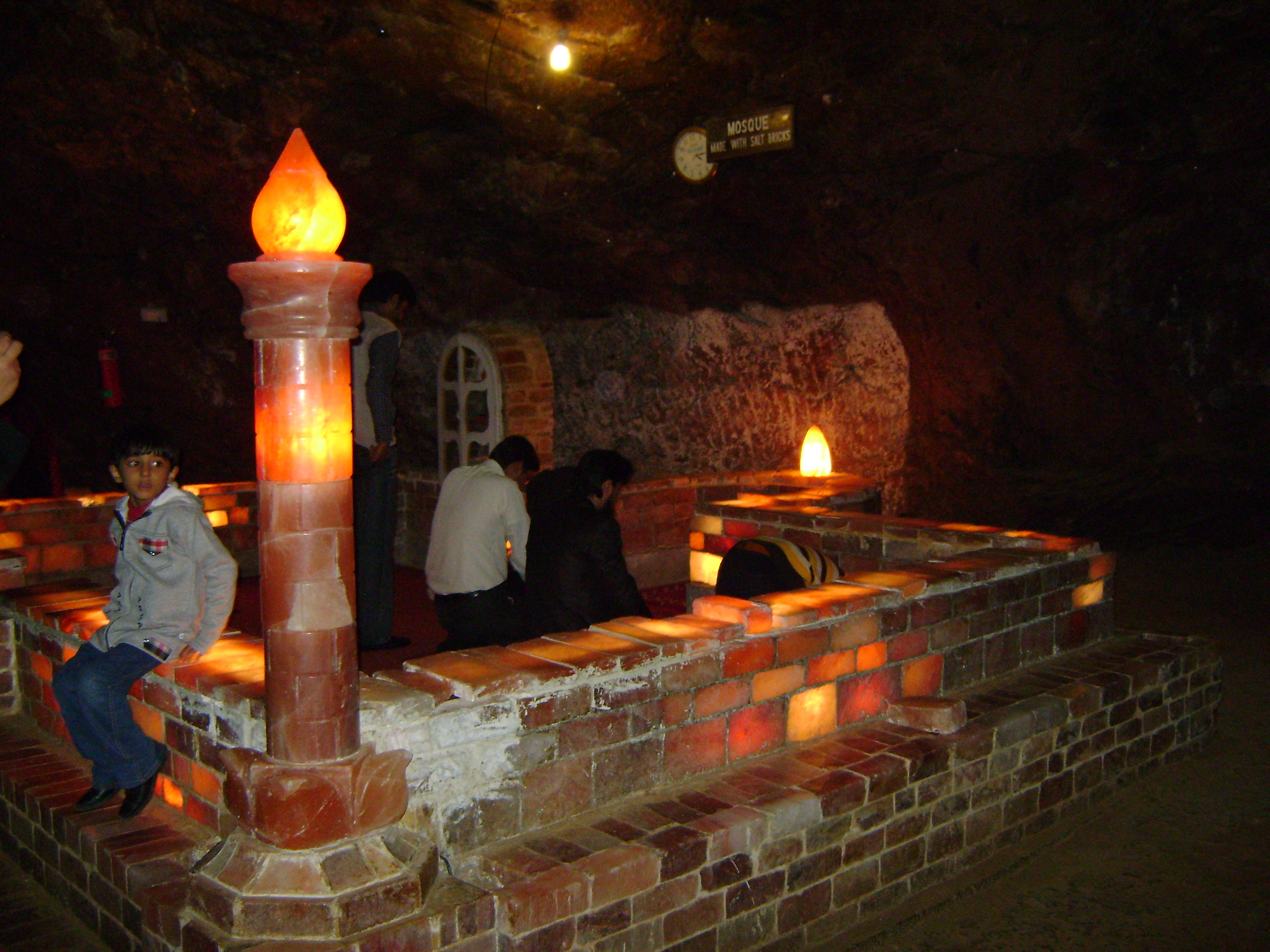
A mosque has been built inside the salt mines.

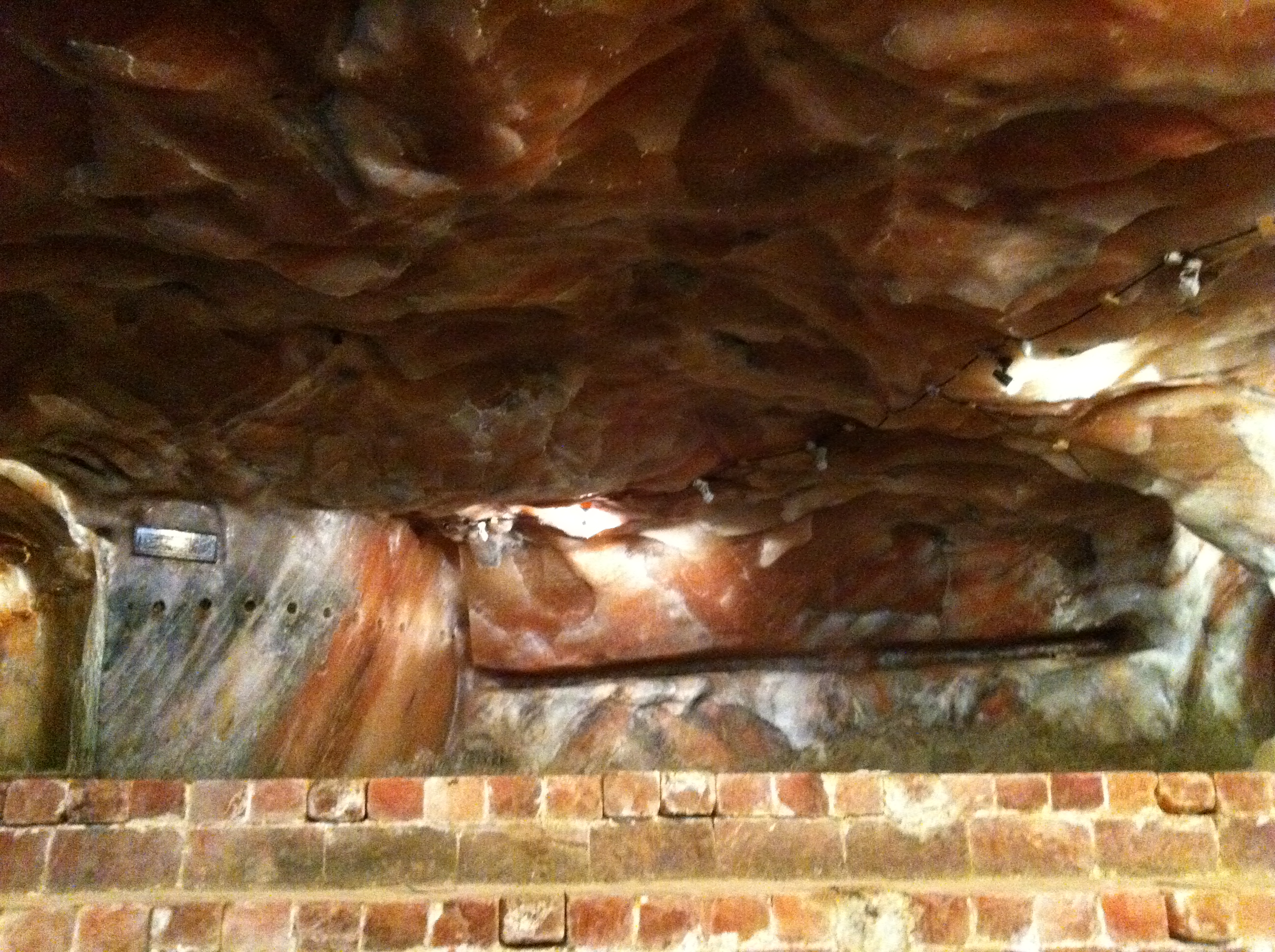
Rock salt makes for some beautiful texture on the walls and ceiling.

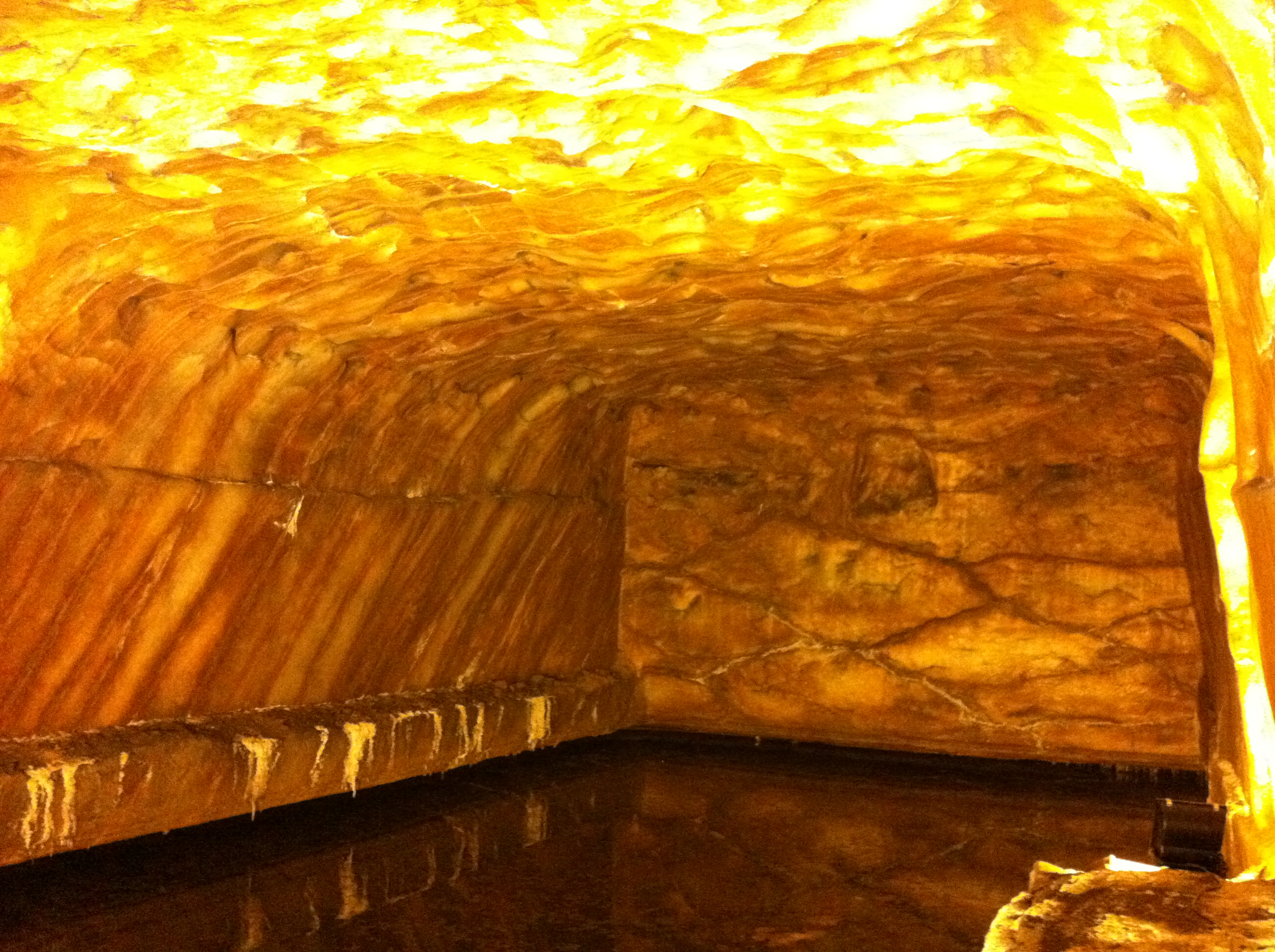
It is said that these rooms were mined during the Mughal era.

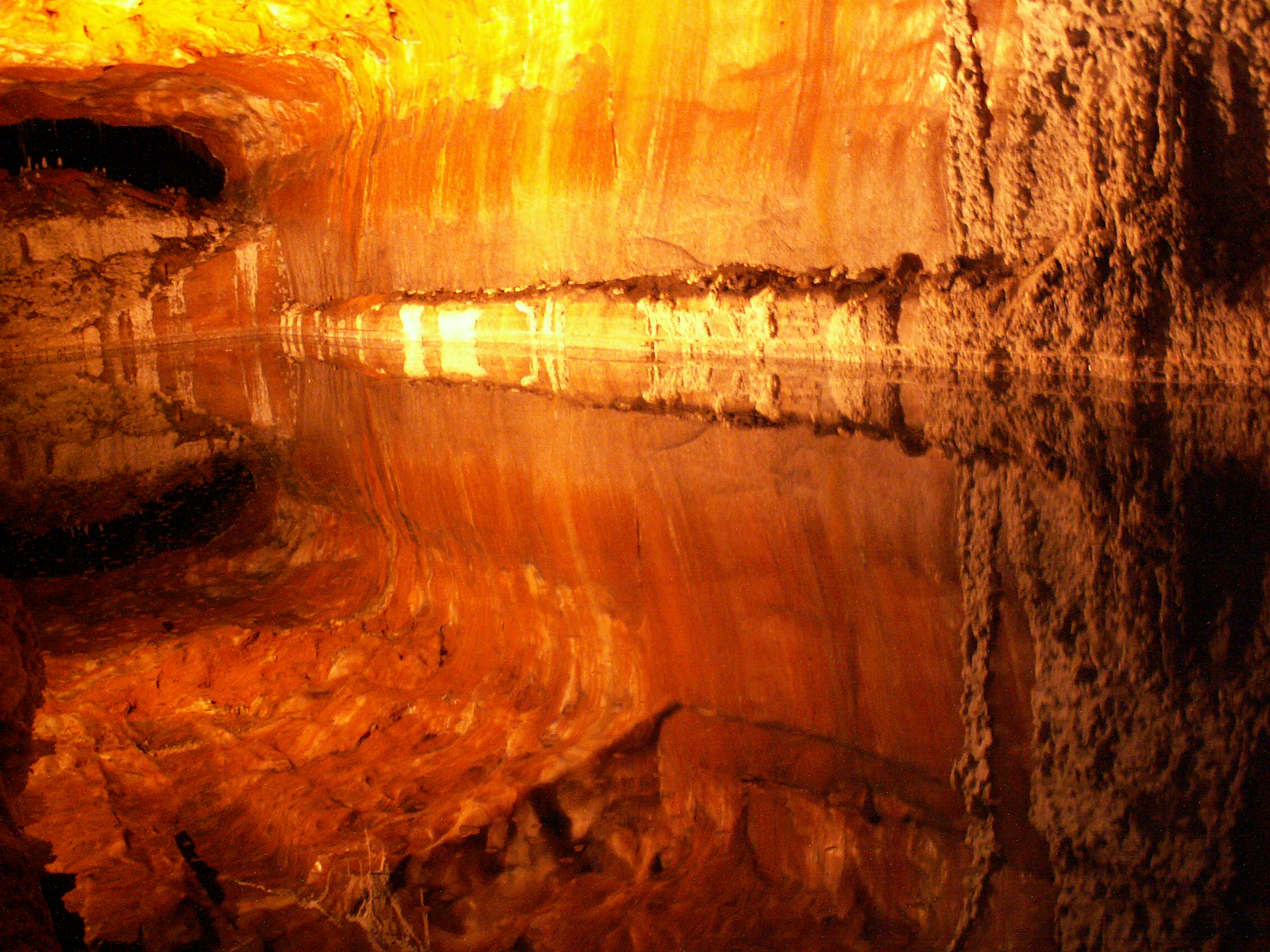
Reflection in salty water at Khewra Salt Mines.

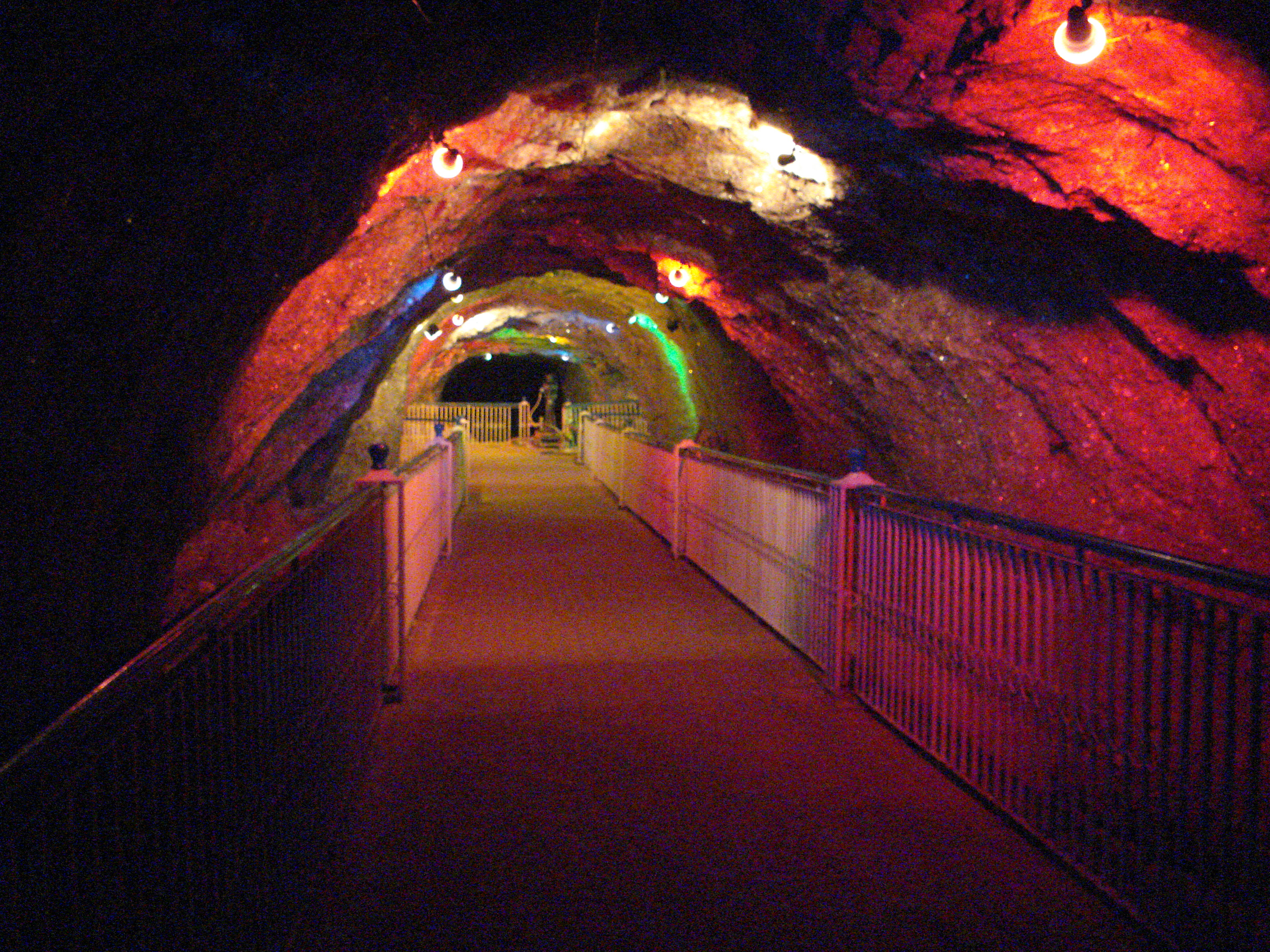
Crystal Valley, a tunnel with crystals in the wall and roof, illuminated by colourful lights.

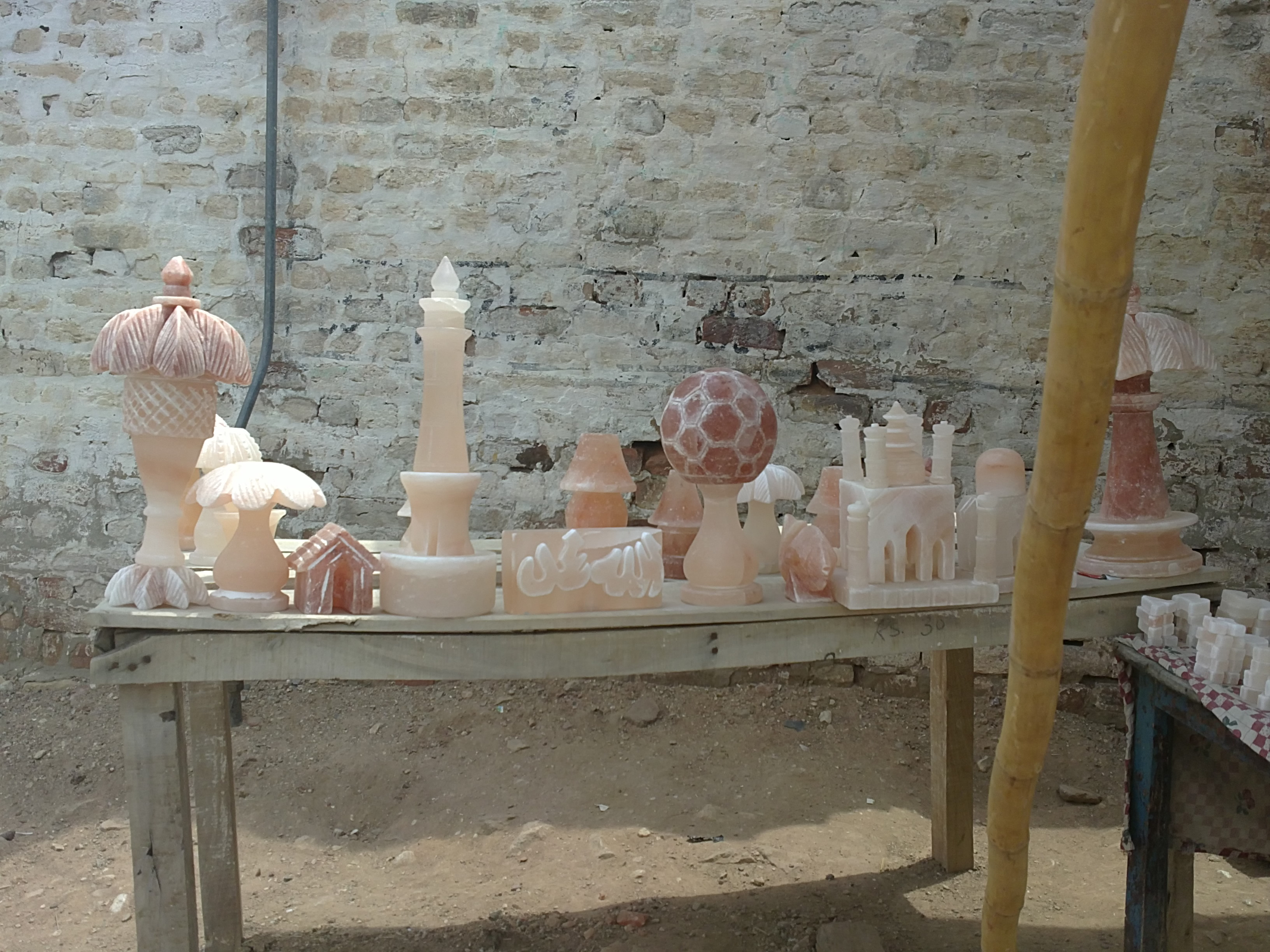
Artistic work with rock salt.

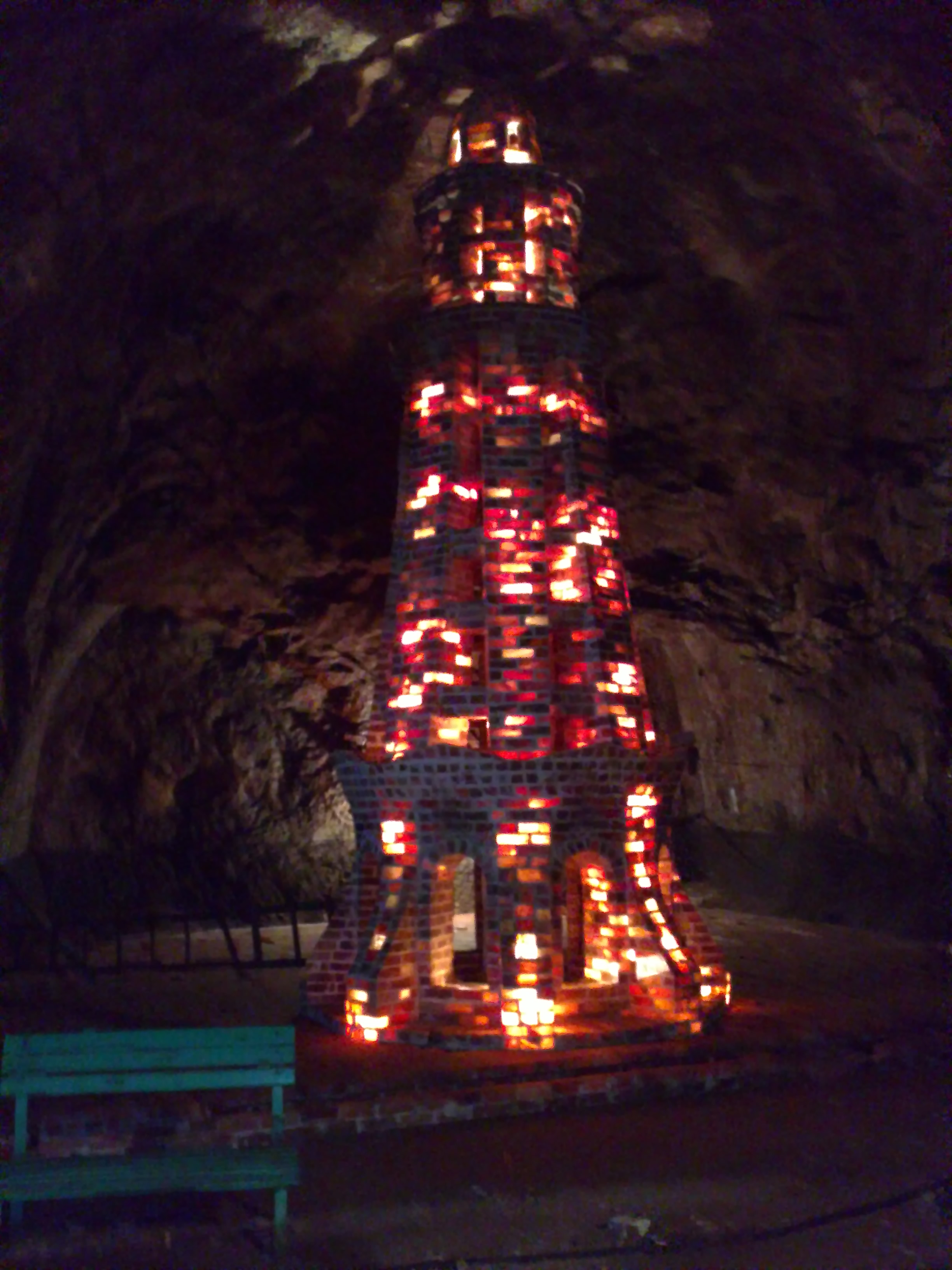
Copy of Minaar-e-Pakistan made of rock salt.

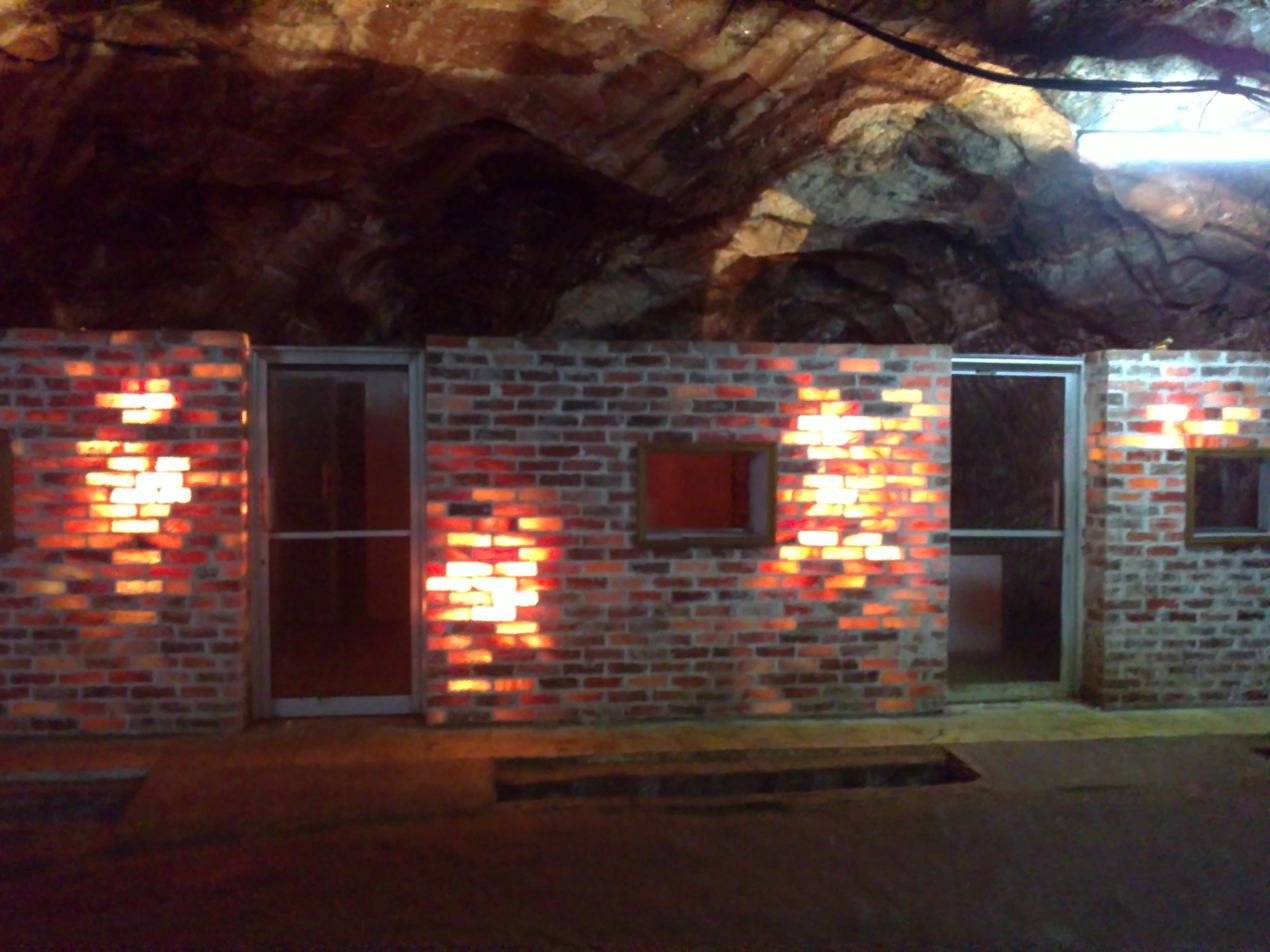
Walls made of rock salt.

== Other projects ==
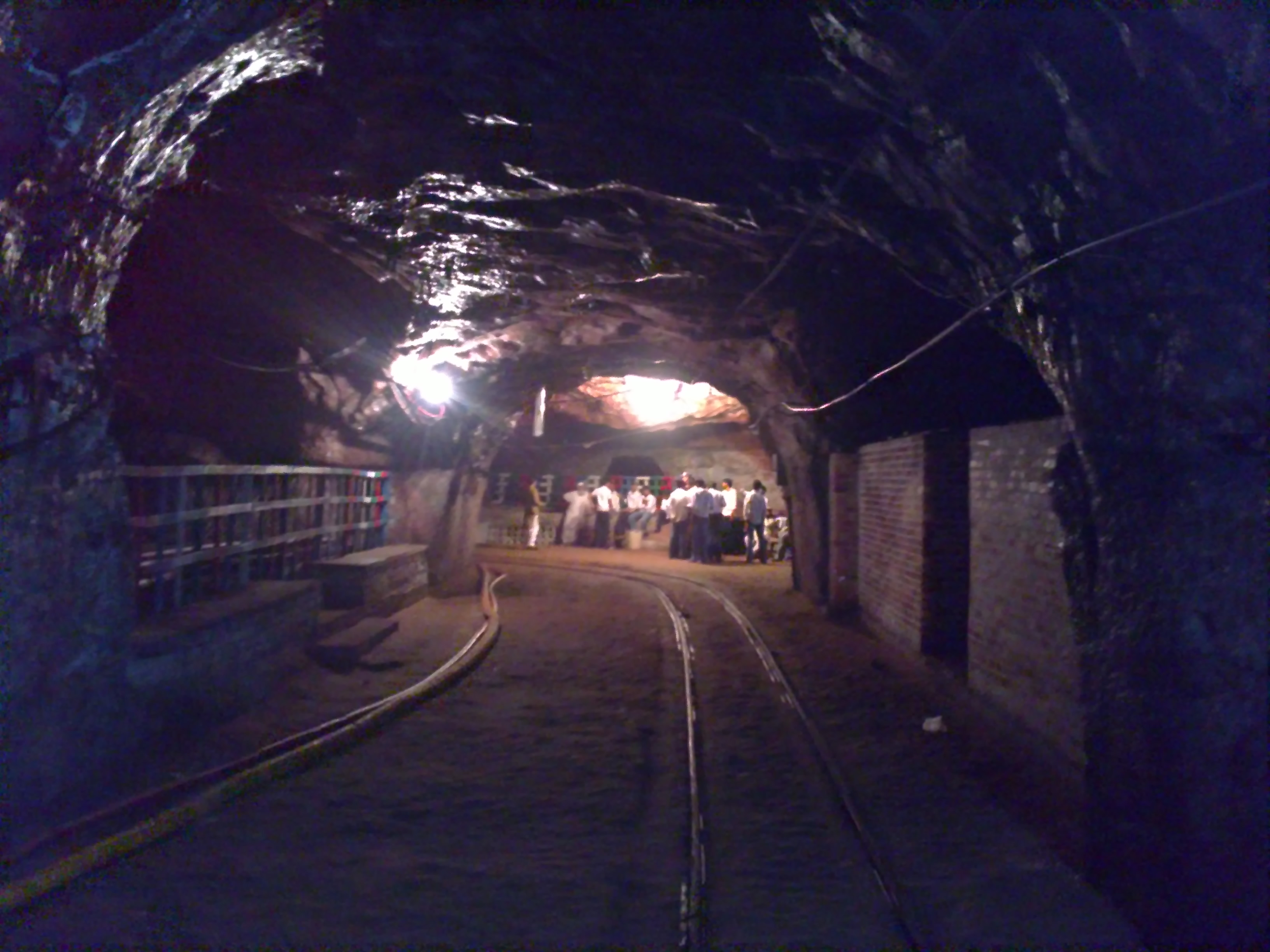
Students of the Mine Survey Institute gathered inside a tunnel

The Pakistan Mineral Development Corporation established the Mine Survey Institute at Khewra in 1971. The institute conducts mine surveys, organises mining-related courses for the miners and established the Khewra Model High School and the Khewra Women College. More recently the miners won an important environmental case against the mining company for the provision of unpolluted drinking water. The water available to the residents of Khewra had been polluted by salt, coal and other nearby mining activity. This case is internationally recognised as important with regard to the relationship between humanity and the environment.

In 2003, while the Government of Pakistan was looking for ways to increase the country's strategic store of oil to 90 days, the PMDC put forward a proposal to use the Khewra mines to store strategic oil reserves. Scientific reports confirmed the feasibility of this proposal, but it was turned down.

== Flooding in 2010 ==
In 2010, during torrential rain all over Pakistan, water from a nearby nullah entered the mine, reaching a depth of sixty-one centimetres (2 ft) and blocking the exits, after which the mine was closed. It was subsequently reopened and remains open.
