= Khushab Junction railway station =

Railway station in Pakistan

Khushab Junction Station خُوشاب جنکشن ریلوے اسٹیشن
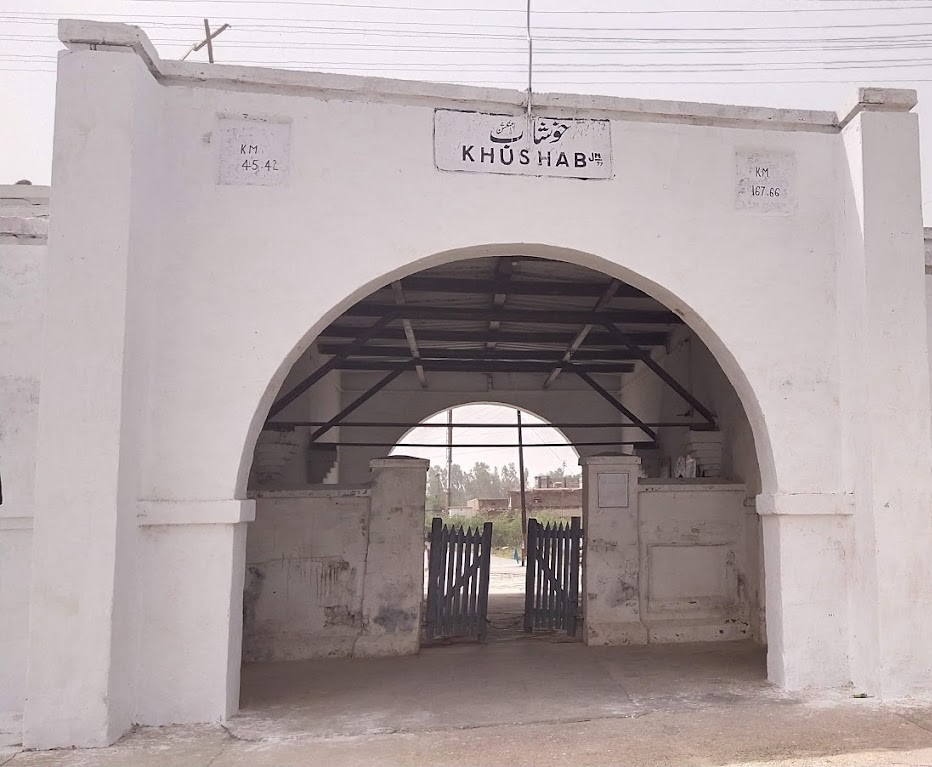

General information
- Coordinates: 32.2987°N 72.3425°E
- Owner: Ministry of Railways
- Lines: Sangla Hill–Kundian Branch Line; Malakwal–Khushab Branch Line

Construction
- Parking: Available
- Accessible: Available

Other information
- Station code: KHB

History
- Opened: 1885

Services
Preceding station	Pakistan Railways	Following station
Aqilshah towards Sangla Hill Junction	Sangla Hill–Kundian Branch Line	Jauharabad towards Kundian Junction
Rakh Rajar towards Malakwal Junction	Malakwal–Khushab Branch Line	Terminus
Location

Khushab Junction Railway Station (Urdu: خُوشاب جنکشن ریلوے اسٹیشن) is located in Pakistan. It was built in 1885 as part of Sind–Sagar Railway.

== See also ==
- List of railway stations in Pakistan
- Pakistan Railways
