= Malakwal Junction railway station =

Railway station in Punjab, Pakistan

Malakwal Junction Station ملک وال جنکشن اسٹیشن
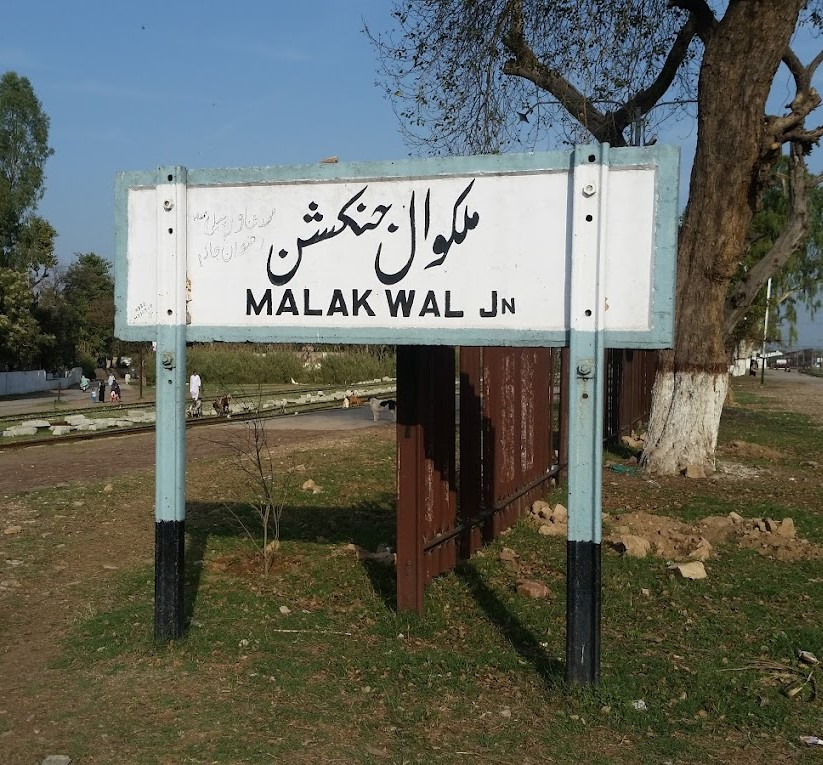

General information
- Coordinates: 32.5529°N 73.2130°E
- Owner: Ministry of Railways
- Lines: Shorkot–Lalamusa Branch Line; Malakwal–Khushab Branch Line; Malakwal–Bhera Railway
- Platforms: 6

Construction
- Parking: Available
- Accessible: Available

Other information
- Station code: MKW

Services
Preceding station	Pakistan Railways	Following station
Chak Saida towards Shorkot Cantonment Junction	Shorkot–Lalamusa Branch Line	Fateh Shahpur Halt towards Lala Musa Junction
Terminus	Malakwal–Khushab Branch Line	Chak Nizam towards Khushab Junction
Terminus	Malakwal–Bhera Railway	Miani towards Bhera
Location

Malakwal Junction Railway Station (Urdu: ملک وال جنکشن ریلوے اسٹیشن) is located in Malakwal city, Mandi Bahauddin district of Punjab province, Pakistan.

== See also ==
- List of railway stations in Pakistan
- Pakistan Railways
