= Chenab Express =

Pakistani express train

Overview
- Service type: Inter-city rail
- First service: 1985
- Current operator: Pakistan Railways

Route
- Termini: Sargodha Junction; Lala Musa Junction
- Stops: 16
- Distance travelled: 158 kilometres (98 mi)
- Average journey time: 3 hours, 50 minutes
- Service frequency: Daily
- Train numbers: 135UP (Sargodha→Lala Musa); 136DN (Lala Musa→Sargodha)

On-board services
- Class: Economy
- Sleeping arrangements: Available
- Catering facilities: Not Available

Technical
- Track gauge: 1,676 mm (5 ft 6 in)
- Track owner: Pakistan Railways

Chenab Express (Urdu: چناب ایکسپریس) previous name Dhamaka express,is a passenger train operated daily by Pakistan Railways between the cities of Sargodha and Lala Musa in the Punjab province. The trip takes approximately 3 hours and 50 minutes to cover a published distance of 158 kilometres (98 mi), traveling along a stretch of the Shorkot–Lalamusa Branch Line. The train is named after the Chenab River During COVID pandemic Dhamaka express was suspended for 3 years.Ch Akhtar Ali Karnana got it restored on 14 April 2022 under name of Chenab express with new refurbished rack of 4 economy coaches and one brack luggage coach.Ch Akhtar Ali Karnana served great job with cooperation and kindness of DS Rawalpindi railway division.Opening ceremony of Chenab express was held at Akhtar Karnana railway station.

== Route ==
- Sargodha Junction–Lala Musa Junction via Shorkot–Lalamusa Branch Line

== Station stops ==
- Sargodha Junction
- Ajnala
- Bhalwal
- Phularwan
- Ratto Kala
- Mona
- Pind Mukko Halt
- Pakhowal
- Banh Mianwala Halt
- Malakwal Junction
- Hariah
- Mandi Bahauddin
- Chillianwala
- Chak Sher Muhammad Halt
- Dinga
- Jaurah Karnana
- Akhtar Karnana
- Lala Musa Junction

== Equipment ==
Chenab Express only offers economy class seating.
