= Millat Express =

Pakistani passenger train

Overview
- Service type: Inter-city rail
- First service: 9 November 2004
- Current operator: Pakistan Railways

Route
- Termini: Karachi Cantonment; Lalamusa Junction
- Stops: 24
- Distance travelled: 1,326 kilometres (824 mi)
- Average journey time: 21 hours, 30 minutes
- Service frequency: Daily
- Train numbers: 17UP (Karachi→Lalamusa); 18DN (Lalamusa→Karachi)

On-board services
- Classes: AC Business; Economy
- Disabled access: 12_06-2019
- Sleeping arrangements: Available
- Auto-rack arrangements: Birth
- Catering facilities: Available

Technical
- Track gauge: 1,676 mm (5 ft 6 in)
- Track owner: Pakistan Railways

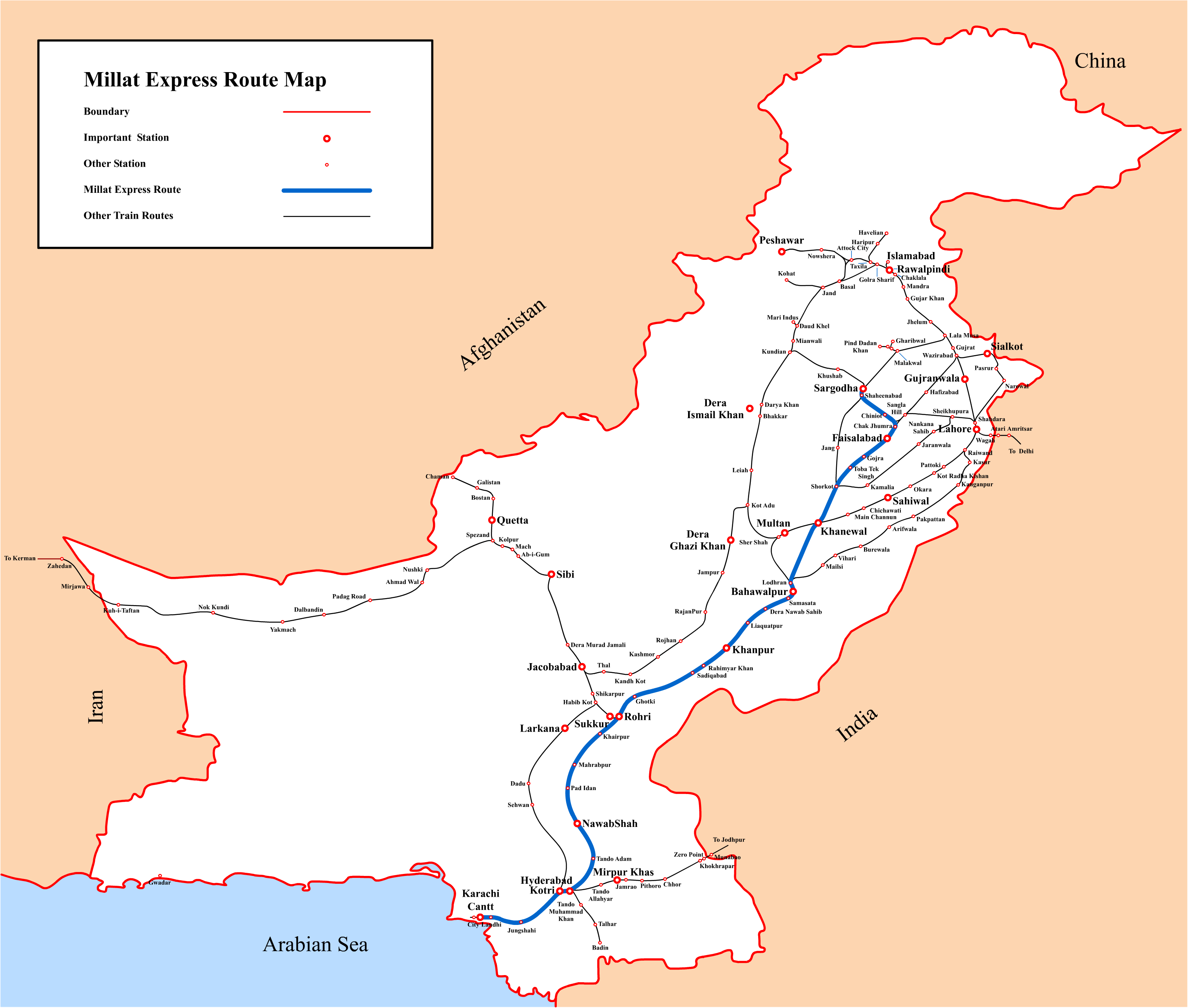
Millat Express Route Map

Millat Express (Urdu: ملت ایکسپریس) is a passenger train operated daily by Pakistan Railways between Karachi and Lalamusa. The trip takes approximately 21 hours, 30 minutes to cover a published distance of 1,326 kilometres (824 mi), traveling along a stretch of the Karachi–Peshawar Railway Line, Khanewal–Wazirabad Branch Line and Shorkot–Lalamusa Branch Line.

== History ==
Initially the Millat Express was operated between Karachi and Faisalabad. Later it was extended to Sargodha and onward to Malakwal.

In June 2021, this train was involved in the 2021 Ghotki rail crash.

== Route ==
- Karachi Cantonment–Khanewal Junction via Karachi–Peshawar Railway Line
- Khanewal Junction–Shorkot Cantonment Junction via Khanewal–Wazirabad Branch Line
- Shorkot Cantonment Junction–Lalamusa Junction via Shorkot–Lalamusa Branch Line

== Station stops ==
Millat Express train timings as of 15 October 2024
| Station Name | Train Code | | | |
| Station Name | 17UP | | 18DN | |
| Station Name | Arrival | Departure | Arrival | Departure |
|---|---|---|---|---|
| Karachi Cantonment | | 17:00 | 12:40 | |
| Drigh Road | 17:22 | 17:24 | 12:06 | 12:08 |
| Hyderabad Junction | 19:40 | 19:48 | 09:30 | 09:35 |
| Shahdadpur | 21:00 | 21:02 | 08:14 | 08:16 |
| Nawabshah | 21:32 | 21:34 | 07:21 | 07:23 |
| Bhiria Road | 22:23 | 22:25 | 05:48 | 05:51 |
| Mahrabpur Junction | 22:51 | 22:53 | 05:26 | 05:28 |
| Rohri Junction | 00:40 | 01:05 | 03:55 | 04:20 |
| Sadikabad | 03:23 | 03:25 | 01:26 | 01:28 |
| Rahim Yar Khan | 03:55 | 03:57 | 01:04 | 01:06 |
| Khanpur | 05:15 | 05:17 | 00:30 | 00:32 |
| Bahawalpur | 06:50 | 06:52 | 22:50 | 22:54 |
| Lodhran Junction | 07:15 | 07:17 | 22:28 | 22:30 |
| Dunyapur | 07:46 | 07:48 | 21:58 | 22:00 |
| Jahanian | 08:10 | 08:12 | 21:33 | 21:35 |
| Khanewal Junction | 08:40 | 09:00 | 20:45 | 21:05 |
| Abdul Hakim | 09:35 | 09:37 | 20:06 | 20:08 |
| Shorkot Cantonment Junction | 10:03 | 10:05 | 19:40 | 19:42 |
| Toba Tek Singh | 10:30 | 10:32 | 18:58 | 19:00 |
| Gojra | 11:04 | 11:06 | 18:29 | 18:31 |
| Faisalabad | 12:00 | 12:30 | 17:15 | 17:50 |
| Chak Jhumra Junction | 12:59 | 13:00 | 16:36 | 16:38 |
| Chiniot | 13:28 | 13:30 | 15:42 | 15:44 |
| Chanab Nagar | 13:40 | 13:42 | 15:23 | 15:25 |
| Shahinabad Junction | 14:35 | 14:36 | 14:40 | 14:41 |
| Sargodha Junction | 15:30 | 15:45 | 14:00 | 14:15 |
| Bhalwal | 16:34 | 16:36 | 13:04 | 13:06 |
| Phularwan | 17:00 | 17:02 | 12:40 | 12:42 |
| Malakwal Junction | 17:35 | 17:45 | 12:00 | 12:10 |
| Mandi Bahauddin | 18:15 | 18:17 | 11:21 | 11:23 |
| Chilianwala | 18:33 | 18:35 | 11:06 | 11:08 |
| Dinga | 18:48 | 18:50 | 10:54 | 10:56 |
| Lalamusa Junction | 19:15 | | 10:30 | |

== Equipment ==
The train offers both AC Business and economy accommodations.

== Train crash ==
In June 2021, the Millat Express was involved in an accident causing at least 65 deaths. The Millat Express derailed initially without involvation of another train, but a few minutes later a further passenger train crashed into the wreckages.
