= Chak Jhumra–Kundian Branch Line =

Railway line in Pakistan

Overview
- Native name: جُھمرا کندیاں-چک فرعی ریلوے خط
- Status: Operational
- Owner: Pakistan Railways
- Termini: Sangla Hill Junction; Kundian Junction
- Stations: 16

Service
- Operator: Pakistan Railways

Technical
- Line length: 241 km (150 mi)
- Track gauge: 1,676 mm (5 ft 6 in)
- Operating speed: 70 km/h (43 mph) (Current)

Chak Jhumra–Kundian Branch Line (Urdu: چک جُھمرہ-كُندياں فرعی ریلوے خط) is one of several branch lines in Pakistan, operated and maintained by Pakistan Railways. The line begins from Chak Jhumra Junction station and ends at Kundian Junction station. There are 16 railway stations on this 241 kilometers (150 mi) long railway line.

== Stations ==
- Chak Jhumra Junction
- Sathoiwala (Abandoned)
- Burj
- Munianwala (Abandoned)
- Chiniot
- Chenab Nagar
- Kot Amir Shah (Abandoned)
- Lalian
- Tinoka (Abandoned)
- Nishtarabad
- Shahinabad Junction
- Pindi Rasul (Abandoned)
- Charnali
- Bajwa (Abandoned)
- Tariqabad Halt (Abandoned)
- Sargodha Junction
- Ludewala (Abandoned)
- Dhrema (Abandoned)
- Wegowal
- Shahpur Sadar (Abandoned)
- Katimar (Abandoned)
- Khushab Junction
- Jauharabad
- Hadali (Abandoned)
- Mitha Tiwana
- Bijjar (Abandoned)
- Qaidabad
- Bandial (Abandoned)
- Shadia (Abandoned)
- Wanbhachran
- Sabzazar (Abandoned)
- Kundian Junction
