= Shorkot–Lala Musa Branch Line =

Railway line in Punjab, Pakistan

Shorkot–Lala Musa Branch Line شورکوٹ-لالہ موسیٰ برانچ لائن

Overview
- Other name: Sind–Sagar Railway
- Status: Operational
- Owner: Pakistan Railways
- Termini: Shorkot Cantonment Junction; Lala Musa Junction
- Stations: 32

Service
- Operator: Pakistan Railways

Technical
- Line length: 325 km (202 mi)
- Track gauge: 1,676 mm (5 ft 6 in)
- Operating speed: 40 km/h (25 mph) to 70 km/h (43 mph)

Shorkot–Lala Musa Branch Line (Urdu: شورکوٹ-لالہ موسیٰ برانچ لائن) is one of several branch lines in Pakistan, operated and maintained by Pakistan Railways. The line begins from Shorkot Cantonment Junction station and ends at Lala Musa Junction station. The total length of this railway line is 325 kilometers (202 mi). There are 32 railway stations on the line from Shorkot Junction to Akhtar Karnana before Lala Musa Junction. Currently, the trains operating on this branch line are Hazara Express, Millat Express, Chenab Express and PDK Shuttle.

== History ==
The Shorkot–Lala Musa Branch Line was originally constructed as a metre gauge railway from Lala Musa to Malakwal in 1881 and named the Sind–Sagar Railway. In 1886, the Sind–Sagar Railway was amalgamated with other railways in the region to form the North Western State Railway. During this time period, the railway line was converted to broad gauge.

== Stations ==
- Shorkot Cantonment Junction
- Khanora (Abandoned)
- Waryam
- Rustam Sargana
- Gilmala Halt (Abandoned)
- Muddoki
- Jhang Sadar
- Jhang City
- Thatta Mahla
- Rivaz East Bank (Abandoned)
- Rivaz West Bank (Abandoned)
- Chund
- Shah Jewana
- Shah Nikdur
- Sobhaga
- Hafeezabad (Abandoned)
- Haryanwala (Abandoned)
- Khalidabad (Abandoned)
- Sillanwali
- Manguana Halt (Abandoned)
- Aladana (Abandoned)
- Shahinabad Junction
- Pindi Rasul (Abandoned)
- Charnali
- Bajwa (Abandoned)
- Tariqabad Halt (Abandoned)
- Sargodha Junction
- Mitha Lak
- Chak Waraichanwala (Abandoned)
- Ajnala
- Qudratabad Halt (Abandoned)
- Bhalwal
- Wil Sonpur (Abandoned)
- Phularwan
- Ratto Kala
- Mona
- Pind Mukko Halt
- Pakhowal
- Banh Mianwala Halt
- Chak Saida (Abandoned)
- Malakwal Junction
- Fateh Shahpur Halt (Abandoned)
- Hariah
- Ala (Abandoned)
- Shahtaj (Abandoned)
- Mandi Bahauddin
- Lakhnewala Halt (Abandoned)
- Chillianwala
- Chak Sher Muhammad Halt
- Dinga
- Jafarabad Halt (Abandoned)
- Pir Jhand Halt (Abandoned)
- Jaurah Karnana
- Akhtar Karnana
- Lala Musa Junction
- Ocepur Railway Station (Abandoned)
