= Sargodha Junction railway station =

Railway station in Pakistan

Sargodha Junction Station سرگودها جنکشن ریلوے اسٹیشن
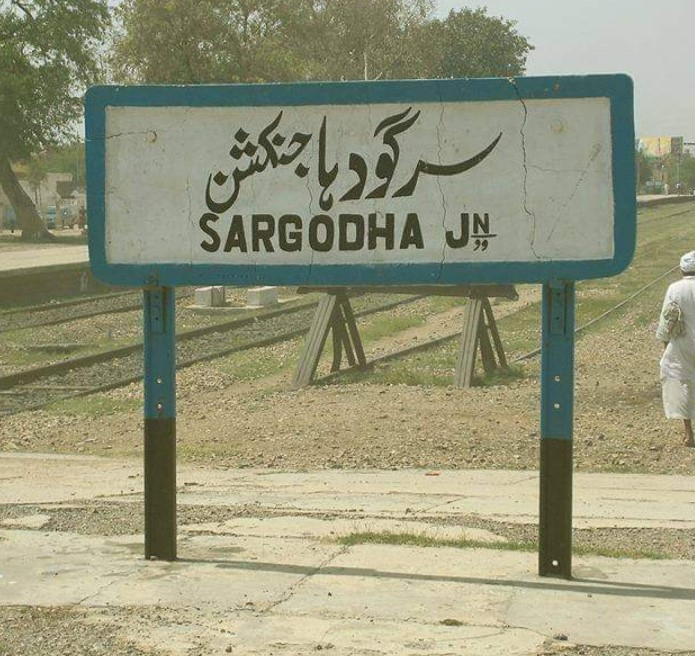

General information
- Location: Dr. Wazir Agha Road; Sargodha, Punjab 40100; Pakistan
- Coordinates: 32.0836°N 72.6763°E
- Owner: Ministry of Railways
- Lines: Shorkot–Lalamusa Branch Line; Sangla Hill–Kundian Branch Line
- Platforms: 5

Construction
- Parking: Available

Other information
- Station code: SRQ

History
- Opened: 1903

Services
Preceding station	Pakistan Railways	Following station
Charnali towards Shorkot Cantonment Junction	Shorkot–Lalamusa Branch Line	Mitha Lak towards Lala Musa Junction
Charnali towards Sangla Hill Junction	Sangla Hill–Kundian Branch Line	Wegowal towards Kundian Junction
Location

Sargodha Junction Railway Station (Urdu: سرگودها جنکشن ریلوے اسٹیشن) is located in the city of Sargodha, Punjab province of Pakistan. An important railway station of Pakistan Railways, it serves as the junction between the Shorkot–Lalamusa Branch Line and Sangla Hill–Kundian Branch Line.

== Facilities ==
Sargodha Junction Station is equipped with all basic facilities. The station has current and advance reservation offices for Pakistan Railways with retail shops and restaurants located on the platform.

== Services ==
The following trains stop at Sargodha Junction station:

Preceding station	Pakistan Railways	Following station
Shahinabad Junction towards Karachi City	Hazara Express	Bhalwal towards Havelian
Shahinabad Junction towards Karachi Cantonment	Millat Express	Bhalwal towards Malakwal Junction

== See also ==
- List of railway stations in Pakistan
- Pakistan Railways
