= Ala railway station =

Railway station in Pakistan

Coordinates: 32.573381°N 73.392301°E

Ala Railway Station الا ریلوے اسٹیشن

General information
- Owner: Ministry of Railways
- Line: Shorkot–Lalamusa Branch Line

Other information
- Station code: ALA

Services
Preceding station	Pakistan Railways	Following station
Hariah towards Shorkot Cantonment Junction	Shorkot–Lalamusa Branch Line	Mandi Bahauddin towards Lala Musa Junction
Location

Ala Railway Station (Urdu: الا ریلوے اسٹیشن) is located in Mandi Bahauddin, Punjab, Pakistan.

== See also ==
- List of railway stations in Pakistan
- Pakistan Railways
