= Charnali railway station =

Railway station in Pakistan

Charnali Railway Station چرنالی ریلوے اسٹیشن

General information
- Coordinates: 32.0188°N 72.6414°E
- Owner: Ministry of Railways
- Lines: Shorkot–Lalamusa Branch Line; Sangla Hill–Kundian Branch Line

Other information
- Station code: CRH

Services
Preceding station	Pakistan Railways	Following station
Pindi Rasul towards Shorkot Cantonment Junction	Shorkot–Lalamusa Branch Line	Sargodha Junction towards Lala Musa Junction
Pindi Rasul towards Sangla Hill Junction	Sangla Hill–Kundian Branch Line	Sargodha Junction towards Kundian Junction
Location

Charnali Railway Station (Urdu: چرنالی ریلوے اسٹیشن) is located near Sargodha city in Pakistan.

== See also ==
- List of railway stations in Pakistan
- Pakistan Railways
