= Pindi Rasul railway station =

Railway station in Pakistan

Pindi Rasul Railway Station پنڈی رسول ریلوے اسٹیشن

General information
- Owner: Ministry of Railways
- Lines: Shorkot–Lalamusa Branch Line; Sangla Hill–Kundian Branch Line

Other information
- Station code: PNRS

Services
Preceding station	Pakistan Railways	Following station
Shahinabad Junction towards Shorkot Cantonment Junction	Shorkot–Lalamusa Branch Line	Charnali towards Lala Musa Junction
Shahinabad Junction towards Sangla Hill Junction	Sangla Hill–Kundian Branch Line	Charnali towards Kundian Junction
Location

Pindi Rasul Railway Station (Urdu: پنڈی رسول اسٹیشن) is located in Pakistan.

== See also ==
- List of railway stations in Pakistan
- Pakistan Railways
