= Mudduki railway station =

Railway station in Pakistan

Mudduki Railway Station مددکی ریلوے اسٹیشن

General information
- Coordinates: 31.1545°N 72.2917°E
- Owner: Ministry of Railways
- Line: Shorkot–Lalamusa Branch Line

Other information
- Station code: MDI

Services
Preceding station	Pakistan Railways	Following station
Gilmala Halt towards Shorkot Cantonment Junction	Shorkot–Lalamusa Branch Line	Jhang Sadar towards Lala Musa Junction
Location

Mudduki Railway Station (Urdu: مددکی ریلوے اسٹیشن) is located in Pakistan.

== See also ==
- List of railway stations in Pakistan
- Pakistan Railways
