= Shahpur Sadar railway station =

Railway station in Pakistan

Shahpur Sadar Station شاہ پُور صدر ریلوے اسٹیشن

General information
- Coordinates: 32.2621°N 72.4646°E
- Owner: Ministry of Railways
- Line: Shorkot–Lalamusa Branch Line

Other information
- Status: Closed
- Station code: SHPS

Services
Preceding station	Pakistan Railways	Following station
Wegowal towards Sangla Hill Junction	Sangla Hill–Kundian Branch Line	Aqilshah towards Kundian Junction
Location

Shahpur Sadar Railway Station (Urdu: شاہ پُور صدر ریلوے اسٹیشن) is an abandoned railway station located in Pakistan.

== See also ==
- List of railway stations in Pakistan
- Pakistan Railways
