= Chund railway station =

Railway station in Pakistan

Chund Railway Station چنڈ ریلوے اسٹیشن

General information
- Coordinates: 31.4332°N 72.2673°E
- Owner: Ministry of Railways
- Line: Shorkot–Lalamusa Branch Line

Other information
- Station code: CUH

Services
Preceding station	Pakistan Railways	Following station
Thatta Mahla towards Shorkot Cantonment Junction	Shorkot–Lalamusa Branch Line	Shah Jewana towards Lala Musa Junction
Location

Chund Railway Station (Urdu: چنڈ ریلوے اسٹیشن) is located in Pakistan.

== See also ==
- List of railway stations in Pakistan
- Pakistan Railways
