= Fateh Shahpur Halt railway station =

Railway station in Pakistan

Fateh Shahpur Halt Station فتح شاہ پور ہالٹ اسٹیشن

General information
- Coordinates: 32.5556°N 73.269°E
- Owner: Ministry of Railways
- Line: Shorkot–Lalamusa Branch Line

Other information
- Station code: FSRR

Services
Preceding station	Pakistan Railways	Following station
Malakwal Junction towards Shorkot Cantonment Junction	Shorkot–Lalamusa Branch Line	Hariah towards Lala Musa Junction
Location

Fateh Shahpur Halt Railway Station (Urdu: فتح شاہ پور ہالٹ ریلوے اسٹیشن) is located in Pakistan.

== See also ==
- List of railway stations in Pakistan
- Pakistan Railways
