= Qudratabad railway station =

Railway station in Pakistan

Qudratabad Railway Station قدرت آباد ریلوے اسٹیشن

General information
- Coordinates: 32.2402°N 72.8765°E
- Owner: Ministry of Railways
- Line: Shorkot–Lalamusa Branch Line

Other information
- Station code: QDTB

Services
Preceding station	Pakistan Railways	Following station
Ajnala towards Shorkot Cantonment Junction	Shorkot–Lalamusa Branch Line	Bhalwal towards Lala Musa Junction
Location

Qudratabad Railway Station (Urdu: قدرت آباد ریلوے اسٹیشن) is located in Pakistan.

== See also ==
- List of railway stations in Pakistan
- Pakistan Railways
