= Mitha Tiwana railway station =

Railway station Mitha Tiwana

Mitha Tiwana Station مِٹھہ ٹِوانہ ریلوے اسٹیشن

General information
- Coordinates: 32.2970°N 72.0879°E
- Owner: Ministry of Railways
- Line: Sangla Hill–Kundian Branch Line

Other information
- Station code: MTW

Services
Preceding station	Pakistan Railways	Following station
Hadali towards Sangla Hill Junction	Sangla Hill–Kundian Branch Line	Bijjar towards Kundian Junction
Location

Mitha Tiwana Railway Station (Urdu: مِٹھہ ٹِوانہ ریلوے اسٹیشن), station code MTW, is located in Khusab district in the province of Punjab, Pakistan.

== See also ==
- List of railway stations in Pakistan
- Pakistan Railways
- Mitha Tiwana
