= Gilmala Halt railway station =

Railway station in Pakistan

Coordinates: 31.08686°N 72.250829°E

Gilmala Halt Railway Station گل مالا ہالٹ ریلوے اسٹیشن

General information
- Owner: Ministry of Railways
- Line: Shorkot–Lalamusa Branch Line

Other information
- Station code: GML

Services
Preceding station	Pakistan Railways	Following station
Rustam Sargana towards Shorkot Cantonment Junction	Shorkot–Lalamusa Branch Line	Mudduki towards Lala Musa Junction
Location

Gilmala Halt Railway Station (Urdu: گل مالا ہالٹ ریلوے اسٹیشن, Punjabi: گل مالا ہالٹ ریلوے اسٹیشن) is located in Pakistan.

== See also ==
- List of railway stations in Pakistan
- Pakistan Railways
