= Wil Sonpur railway station =

Railway station in Pakistan

Wil Sonpur Railway Station ول سونپور ریلوے اسٹیشن

General information
- Coordinates: 32.3009°N 72.9481°E
- Owner: Ministry of Railways
- Line: Shorkot–Lalamusa Branch Line

Other information
- Station code: WSN

Services
Preceding station	Pakistan Railways	Following station
Bhalwal towards Shorkot Cantonment Junction	Shorkot–Lalamusa Branch Line	Phularwan towards Lala Musa Junction
Location

Wil Sonpur Railway Station (Urdu: ول سونپور ریلوے اسٹیشن) is located in Pakistan.

== See also ==
- List of railway stations in Pakistan
- Pakistan Railways
