= Sobhaga railway station =

Railway station in Pakistan

Sobhaga Railway Station سوبھاگا ریلوے اسٹیشن

General information
- Coordinates: 31.7108°N 72.3992°E
- Owner: Ministry of Railways
- Line: Shorkot–Lalamusa Branch Line

Other information
- Station code: SBQ

Services
Preceding station	Pakistan Railways	Following station
Shah Nikdur towards Shorkot Cantonment Junction	Shorkot–Lalamusa Branch Line	Haryanwala towards Lala Musa Junction
Location

Sobhaga Railway Station (Urdu: سوبھاگا ریلوے اسٹیشن) is located in Pakistan.

== See also ==
- List of railway stations in Pakistan
- Pakistan Railways
