= Aladana railway station =

Railway station in Pakistan

Coordinates: 31.8819°N 72.60207°E

Aladana Railway Station الا دانہ ریلوے اسٹیشن

General information
- Owner: Ministry of Railways
- Line: Shorkot–Lalamusa Branch Line

Other information
- Station code: ADZ

Services
Preceding station	Pakistan Railways	Following station
Sillanwali towards Shorkot Cantonment Junction	Shorkot–Lalamusa Branch Line	Shahinabad Junction towards Lala Musa Junction
Location

Aladana Railway Station (Urdu: الا دانہ ریلوے اسٹیشن) is located in Pakistan.

== See also ==
- List of railway stations in Pakistan
- Pakistan Railways
