= Chak Saida railway station =

Railway station in Pakistan

Chak Saida Railway Station چک سیدا ریلوے اسٹیشن

General information
- Coordinates: 32.5383°N 73.1725°E
- Owner: Ministry of Railways
- Line: Shorkot–Lalamusa Branch Line

Other information
- Station code: CKSA

Services
Preceding station	Pakistan Railways	Following station
Bana Mianwala Halt towards Shorkot Cantonment Junction	Shorkot–Lalamusa Branch Line	Malakwal Junction towards Lala Musa Junction
Location

Chak Saida Railway Station (Urdu: چک سیدا ریلوے اسٹیشن) is located in Pakistan.

== See also ==
- List of railway stations in Pakistan
- Pakistan Railways
