= Dar ul Ihsan railway station =

Railway station in Punjab, Pakistan

Dar ul Ihsan Railway Station دارالاحسان ریلوے اسٹیشن

General information
- Owner: Ministry of Railways
- Lines: Khanewal–Wazirabad Branch Line; Sangla Hill–Kundian Branch Line

Other information
- Station code: DRLN

History
- Former names: Salarwala Railway Station

Services
| Preceding station | Pakistan Railways | Following station |
|---|---|---|
| Sahianwala towards Khanewal Junction | Khanewal–Wazirabad Branch Line | Sangla Hill Junction towards Wazirabad Junction |
| Sangla Hill Junction Terminus | Sangla Hill–Kundian Branch Line | Sahianwala towards Kundian Junction |
Location

Dar ul Ihsan Railway Station (Urdu: دارالاحسان ریلوے اسٹیشن) is located in Dar ul Ihsan town, Faisalabad district of Punjab province, Pakistan. It was formerly known as Salarwala railway station.

== See also ==
- List of railway stations in Pakistan
- Pakistan Railways
