= Shah Jewana railway station =

Railway station in Pakistan

Shah Jewana Railway Station شاہ جیونا ریلوے اسٹیشن

General information
- Coordinates: 31.5638°N 72.2943°E
- Owner: Ministry of Railways
- Line: Shorkot–Lalamusa Branch Line

Other information
- Station code: SJW

Services
Preceding station	Pakistan Railways	Following station
Chund towards Shorkot Cantonment Junction	Shorkot–Lalamusa Branch Line	Shah Nikdur towards Lala Musa Junction
Location

Shah Jewana Railway Station (Urdu: شاہ جیونا ریلوے اسٹیشن) is located in Pakistan.

== See also ==
- List of railway stations in Pakistan
- Pakistan Railways
