= Shadia (disambiguation) =

Shadia (1931–2017) was an Egyptian actress and singer.

Shadia may also refer to

- Shadia (given name)
- Shadia, Punjab, a town and union council in Pakistan
  - Shadia railway station
