= Waryam railway station =

Railway station in Pakistan

Waryam Railway Station وریام ریلوے اسٹیشن

General information
- Coordinates: 30.9624°N 72.2557°E
- Line: Shorkot–Lalamusa Branch Line

Other information
- Station code: WYM

Services
Preceding station	Pakistan Railways	Following station
Khanora towards Shorkot Cantonment Junction	Shorkot–Lalamusa Branch Line	Rustam Sargana towards Lala Musa Junction
Location

Waryam Railway Station (Urdu: وریام ریلوے اسٹیشن, Punjabi: وریام ریلوے اسٹیشن) is located in Pakistan. It is one of the oldest railway stations in Pakistan with historic values. Waryam junction is the point where the one line track is extended to two line tracks.

== See also ==
- List of railway stations in Pakistan
- Pakistan Railways
