= Shah Nikdur railway station =

Railway station in Pakistan

Shah Nikdur Railway Station شاہ نکدر ریلوے اسٹیشن

General information
- Coordinates: 31.6503°N 72.3275°EStation building and train stop approved in 1926.
- Owner: Ministry of Railways
- Line: Shorkot–Lalamusa Branch Line

Other information
- Station code: SXU

Services
Preceding station	Pakistan Railways	Following station
Shah Jewana towards Shorkot Cantonment Junction	Shorkot–Lalamusa Branch Line	Sobhaga towards Lala Musa Junction
Location

Shah Nikdur Railway Station (Urdu: شاہ نکدر ریلوے اسٹیشن) is located in Pakistan.

== See also ==
- List of railway stations in Pakistan
- Pakistan Railways
