= Mitha Lak railway station =

Railway station in Pakistan

Mitha Lak Railway Station میٹھا لک ریلوے اسٹیشن

General information
- Coordinates: 32.1355°N 72.7773°E
- Owner: Ministry of Railways
- Line: Shorkot–Lalamusa Branch Line

Other information
- Station code: MTQ

Services
Preceding station	Pakistan Railways	Following station
Sargodha Junction towards Shorkot Cantonment Junction	Shorkot–Lalamusa Branch Line	Ajnala towards Lala Musa Junction
Location

Mitha Lak Railway Station (Urdu: میٹھا لک ریلوے اسٹیشن) is located in Pakistan.

== See also ==
- List of railway stations in Pakistan
- Pakistan Railways
