= Aqilshah railway station =

Railway station in Pakistan

Aqil Shah Railway Station عقیل شاہ ریلوے اسٹیشن

General information
- Coordinates: 27.0873°N 68.3242°E
- Owner: Ministry of Railways

Other information
- Station code: AKSH

Services
Preceding station	Pakistan Railways	Following station
Shahpur Sadar towards Sangla Hill Junction	Sangla Hill–Kundian Branch Line	Khushab Junction towards Kundian Junction
Location
- Location within Sindh Location within Pakistan

Aqil Shah Railway Station (Urdu: عقیل شاہ ریلوے اسٹیشن) is located in Pakistan.

== See also ==
- List of railway stations in Pakistan
- Pakistan Railways
