= Jhang (disambiguation) =

Jhang is a city in Punjab, Pakistan.

Jhang may also refer to:

- Jhang Tehsil, a tehsil in Pakistan
- Jhang District, a District in Pakistan
- New Jhang, a village in Pakistan
- Jhang Railway Station, a railway station in Jhang
- Zhang (surname), an East Asian surname

== See also ==
- Jhang Branch, a canal in Pakistan
- Jhangvi dialect, of Punjabi from Jhang
