= Jhang City railway station =

Railway station in Jhang, Pakistan

Jhang City Railway Station جھنگ شہر ریلوے اسٹیشن

General information
- Coordinates: 31.3055°N 72.3392°E
- Owner: Ministry of Railways
- Line: Shorkot–Lalamusa Branch Line

Other information
- Station code: JHC

Services
Preceding station	Pakistan Railways	Following station
Jhang Sadar towards Shorkot Cantonment Junction	Shorkot–Lalamusa Branch Line	Thatta Mahla towards Lala Musa Junction
Location

Jhang City Railway Station (Urdu: جھنگ شہر ریلوے اسٹیشن) is located in Jhang city of Punjab province, Pakistan on the Shorkot–Lalamusa Branch Line. This railway station is the stop of only few trains. Jhang Sadar railway station is the principal railway station of the Jhang city.

== See also ==
- List of railway stations in Pakistan
- Pakistan Railways
