= Jauharabad railway station =

Railway station in Khushab, Punjab, Pakistan

Jauharabad Railway Station جَوہرآباد ریلوے اسٹیشن

General information
- Coordinates: 32.2916°N 72.2820°E
- Owner: Ministry of Railways
- Line: Sangla Hill–Kundian Branch Line
- Tracks: 2

Construction
- Parking: 500

Other information
- Station code: JAHD

History
- Opened: 1947

Services
Preceding station	Pakistan Railways	Following station
Khushab Junction towards Sangla Hill Junction	Sangla Hill–Kundian Branch Line	Hadali towards Kundian Junction
Location

Jauharabad Railway Station (Urdu: جَوہرآباد ریلوے اسٹیشن) is located in Khushab District, Punjab Pakistan Jauharabad Railway is a small junction in Sargodha division

== See also ==
- List of railway stations in Pakistan
- Pakistan Railways
