= Pir Jand Halt railway station =

Railway station in Pakistan

Pir Jand Halt Railway Station پیر جنڈ ہالٹ اسٹیشن

General information
- Coordinates: 32.6465°N 73.8047°E
- Owner: Ministry of Railways
- Line: Shorkot–Lalamusa Branch Line

Other information
- Station code: PJND

Services
Preceding station	Pakistan Railways	Following station
Dinga towards Shorkot Cantonment Junction	Shorkot–Lalamusa Branch Line	Jaurah Karnana towards Lala Musa Junction
Location

Pir Jand Halt Railway Station (Urdu: پیر جنڈ ہالٹ ریلوے اسٹیشن) is located on the Shorkot–Lalamusa Branch Line in Punjab, Pakistan.

== See also ==
- List of railway stations in Pakistan
- Pakistan Railways
