= Thatta Mahla railway station =

Railway station in Pakistan

Thatta Mahla Railway Station ٹھٹھہ محلہ ریلوے اسٹیشن

General information
- Coordinates: 31.3648°N 72.3565°E
- Owner: Ministry of Railways
- Line: Shorkot–Lalamusa Branch Line

Other information
- Station code: TTM

Services
Preceding station	Pakistan Railways	Following station
Jhang City towards Shorkot Cantonment Junction	Shorkot–Lalamusa Branch Line	Chund towards Lala Musa Junction
Location

Thatta Mahla Railway Station (Urdu: ٹھٹھہ محلہ ریلوے اسٹیشن) is located in Pakistan.

== See also ==
- List of railway stations in Pakistan
- Pakistan Railways
