= Sahianwala railway station =

Railway station in Punjab, Pakistan

Sahianwala Railway Station ساہیانوالہ ریلوے اسٹیشن

General information
- Coordinates: 31.6311°N 73.2316°E
- Owner: Ministry of Railways
- Lines: Khanewal–Wazirabad Branch Line; Sangla Hill–Kundian Branch Line

Other information
- Station code: SAHW

Services
Preceding station	Pakistan Railways	Following station
Chak Jhumra Junction towards Khanewal Junction	Khanewal–Wazirabad Branch Line	Dar ul Ihsan towards Wazirabad Junction
Dar ul Ihsan towards Sangla Hill Junction	Sangla Hill–Kundian Branch Line	Chak Jhumra Junction towards Kundian Junction
Location

Sahianwala Railway Station (Urdu: ساہیانوالہ ریلوے اسٹیشن) is located in Sahianwala town, Faisalabad district of Punjab province of the Pakistan.

== See also ==
- List of railway stations in Pakistan
- Pakistan Railways
