= Wegowal railway station =

Railway station in Pakistan

Wegowal Railway Station ویگووال ریلوے اسٹیشن

General information
- Coordinates: 32.2008°N 72.5368°E
- Owner: Ministry of Railways
- Line: Shorkot–Lalamusa Branch Line

Other information
- Station code: WGWL

Services
Preceding station	Pakistan Railways	Following station
Sargodha Junction towards Sangla Hill Junction	Sangla Hill–Kundian Branch Line	Shahpur Sadar towards Kundian Junction
Location

Wegowal Railway Station (Urdu: ویگووال ریلوے اسٹیشن) is located in Pakistan.

== See also ==
- List of railway stations in Pakistan
- Pakistan Railways
