= Rustam Sargana railway station =

Railway station in Pakistan

Rustam Sargana Station رستم سرگانہ ریلوے اسٹیشن

General information
- Coordinates: 31.0478°N 72.2497°E
- Owner: Ministry of Railways
- Line: Shorkot–Lalamusa Branch Line

Other information
- Station code: RMG

Services
Preceding station	Pakistan Railways	Following station
Waryam towards Shorkot Cantonment Junction	Shorkot–Lalamusa Branch Line	Gilmala Halt towards Lala Musa Junction
Location

Rustam Sargana Railway Station (Urdu: رستم سرگانہ ریلوے اسٹیشن) is located in Pakistan.

== See also ==
- List of railway stations in Pakistan
- Pakistan Railways
