= Chenab Nagar railway station =

Railway station in Punjab, Pakistan

Chenab Nagar Station چناب نگر ریلوے اسٹیشن
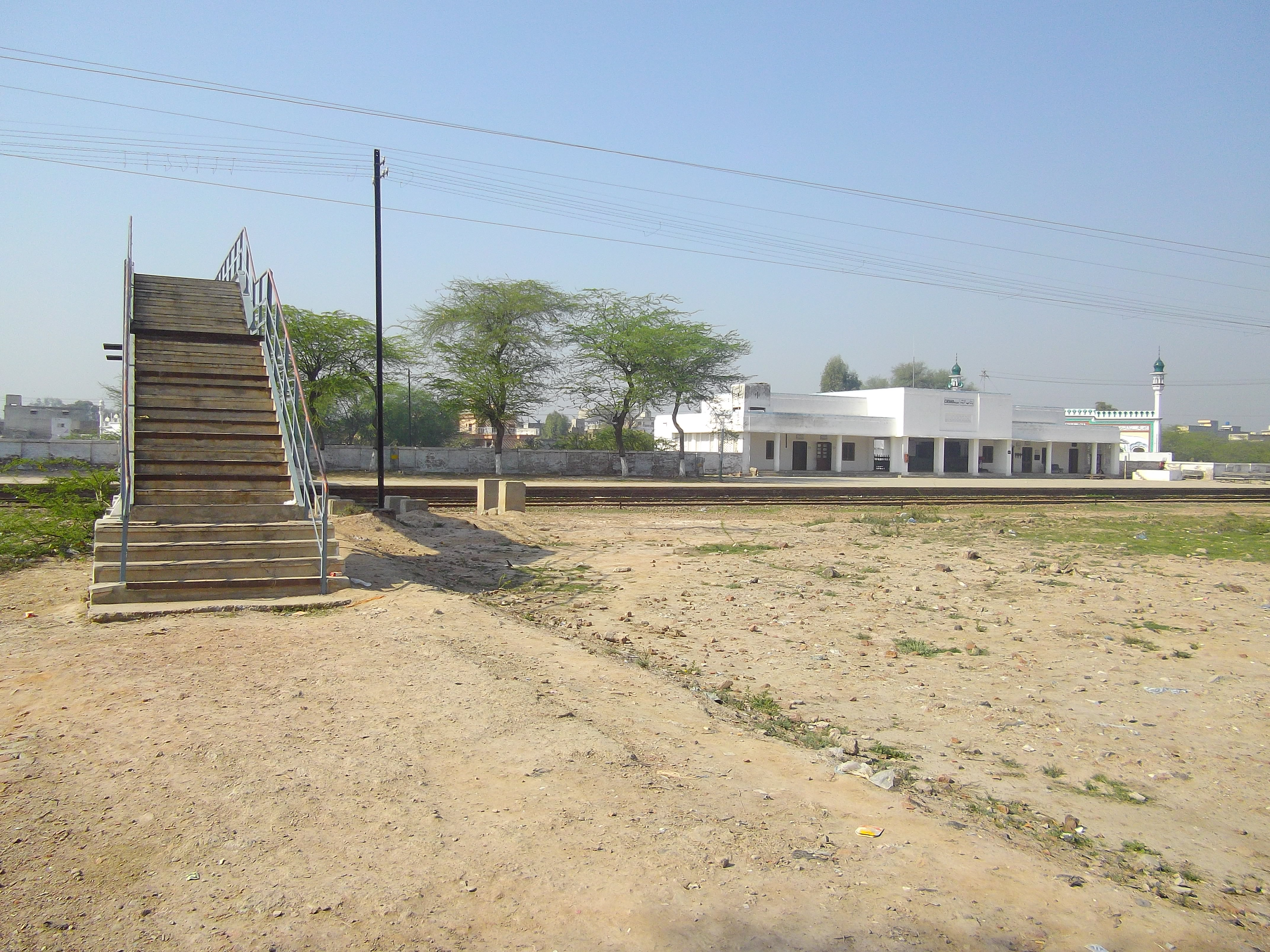
- Chenab Nagar railway station

General information
- Coordinates: 31.7586°N 72.9077°E
- Owner: Ministry of Railways
- Line: Sangla Hill–Kundian Branch Line

Other information
- Station code: CNR

Services
Preceding station	Pakistan Railways	Following station
Chiniot towards Sangla Hill Junction	Sangla Hill–Kundian Branch Line	Lalian towards Kundian Junction
Location

Chenab Nagar Railway Station (Urdu: چناب نگر ریلوے اسٹیشن) is located in Chiniot District, Punjab, Pakistan. It is located on the Sangla Hill–Kundian Branch Line, one of several branch lines in Pakistan.

== See also ==
- List of railway stations in Pakistan
- Pakistan Railways
