= Rangri dialect (Haryanvi) =

Dialect of the Haryanvi language

Rangri
- رانگڑی (ہریاݨوی)
- Native to: Pakistan
- Region: Punjab, Sindh
- Ethnicity: Ranghar
- Language family: Indo-European: Indo-Iranian; Indo-Aryan; Central; Haryanvi; Rangri
- Writing system: Arabic script (Nastaliq)

Language codes
- ISO 639-3: –
- Glottolog: hary1238

Rangri (رانگڑی) is a dialect of the Haryanvi language spoken by Ranghars as a minority language in the Pakistani provinces of Punjab and Sindh. It originated in Haryana, in present-day India, but is now primarily spoken in Pakistan by descendants of partition-era Haryanvi Muhajirs. Its spoken areas include Lahore, Sheikhupura, Bhakkar, Bahawalnagar, Khanpur, Okara, Layyah, Vehari, Sahiwal, Phularwan, and Multan Mirpur Khas Nawabshah, Naushahro Feroze, and Sanghar.

== Demographics ==
After the partition of India, 1.2 million Haryanvi-speaking Muslims (Muhajirs) migrated from Haryana and Delhi in India to Pakistan. Today in Pakistan, it is a mother tongue of millions of Ranghar Muslims. They live in thousands of villages in Punjab, Pakistan, and hundreds of villages in Sindh. After partition, many Uttar Pradesh Ranghars also migrated to Sindh in Pakistan and mostly settled in Karachi.

Most Ranghar are now bilingual in either Urdu, Punjabi or Sindhi but due to state negligence as well cultural assimilation in Punjab and Sindh fewer speak the language with each passing generation, and it's estimated that slightly more than 500,000 may be the real number of Rangri speakers.<ref>Nawaz, Hafiz Imran, Hassin ur Rehman, Nasir Khan, and Muhammad Sarfraz Rao. “Declining of Rangri Language: A Case Study in Karachi.” Journal of Applied Linguistics and TESOL (JALT), vol. 7, no. 4, 2024. ResearchGate. Accessed 5 July 2025.

A heartwarming Rangri tale of generosity, showing how kindness given to others returns in unexpected and meaningful ways.
