= Sillanwali railway station =

Railway station in Punjab, Pakistan

Sillanwali Railway Station سلاں والی ریلوے اسٹیشن

General information
- Coordinates: 31.8268°N 72.5369°E
- Owner: Ministry of Railways
- Line: Shorkot–Lalamusa Branch Line

Other information
- Station code: SWY

Services
Preceding station	Pakistan Railways	Following station
Haryanwala towards Shorkot Cantonment Junction	Shorkot–Lalamusa Branch Line	Aladana towards Lala Musa Junction
Location

Sillanwali Railway Station (Urdu: سلاں والی ریلوے اسٹیشن) is located in Pakistan.

== See also ==
- List of railway stations in Pakistan
- Pakistan Railways
