= Chak Dina =

Village in Punjab, Pakistan

Chak Dina چک دینا
- Village
- Location within Punjab, Pakistan Chak Dina (Pakistan)
- Coordinates: 32°42′10.7058″N 73°52′59.1054″E
- Country: Pakistan
- Province: Punjab
- District: Gujrat
- Tehsil: Kharian
- Police Circle: Headquarters Circle
- Thana: Saddar Lalamusa

Government
  - Type: Union Council
  - Body: Karnana Union Council
  - Justice system: District and Session Courts
- Elevation: 267 m (876 ft)

Population (2017)
  - Total: 1,637
  - Estimate (2023): 1,735
- Demonym: Dinay Chakia
- Time zone: UTC+5 (PST)
- Zip code: 50200
- Area code: 0537

Chak Dina (/tʃək dinə/; Urdu: چک دینا; Colloquial: Dina Chak) is a village in Kharian Tehsil of Gujrat District, Punjab, Pakistan. It is located 16.68 kilometers northeast of Dinga and 7.26 kilometers west of Lalamusa.

== Etymology ==
The name Chak Dina is combination of words Chak meaning village and Dina meaning of Allahdin. The first inhabitant of the village Chaudhry Allahdin was nicknamed Dina hence Chak Dina became the name of the village. There are other villages in the close vicinity which have names of the same pattern like Chak Ikhlas and Chak Rajjadi.

== History ==
The village was founded in the second half of the 18th century CE by Chaudhry Allahdin, a Muslim descendant of Hindu Shahi ruler Jayapala at the site of Shahpur, a city ruined by revolution of the time.

== Demographics ==
In 1966, after the Mangla Dam was built on the Jhelum River, some effected people from Mirpur (Azad Jammu and Kashmir) whose property had come under waters of the dam migrated to the village and inhabited a new locality namely Chak Fazal Shah within the revenue limits of Chak Dina. Besides purchasing land for inhabiting their locality, they also purchased some agricultural land from the people of Chak Dina. In return for such land, the local land holders were helped to immigrate their sons to England for job.

Historical population
Census	Pop.	Time span (yrs)	%±	Annual RoG %±
1951	720	—	—	—
1961	758	10	5.28%	.52%
1972	1,017	11	34.17%	2.71%
1981	1,139	9	12%	1.27%
1998	1,362	17	19.58%	1.06%
2017	1,637	19	20.19%	.97%
2023 (est)	1,735	6	5.99%	.97%

== Grassroots democracy ==
Chak Dina falls in the Karana Union Council since 2026. It is Union Council No. 23 of Tehsil Council Kharian. Previously, Chak Dina has remained part of Gunja and Kotla Qasim Khan union councils.

== Land and revenue ==
The village falls under the revenue limits of Kanungoi Circle Lalamusa and Patwar Circle Jataria Kalan. A Kanungoi Circle is headed by a Kanungo (also Qanungo) and a Patwar Circle is headed by a Patwari.

The village has 1,152 acres in land mass.

== Schools ==
The village has elementary (I-VIII) school for boys and primary (I-V) school for girls.

== Legacy ==
- One of the famous bazaars in the town of Lalamusa is named after Chak Dina and is called Bazaar Dinay Chakian. Dinay Chakian means, in Punjabi, the people from Dina Chak. This bazaar was inhabited by Bagh Sha, a Hindu who migrated from Chak Dina to Lalamusa in 1929. The first building in the bazaar was Haveli Bagh Sha. This was also the first building of the city of Lalamusa built according to a floor plan prepared by an architect. Some parts of this building are still present in original form.
- Two British ships sharing the village's name were built in 1914 and 1951, respectively. It has been stated that these ships were named after Chak Dina, a village in northern Punjab. This is an undisputed reference to the village because no other settlement with the same name existed in northern Punjab during the 20th century AD.
