= Qaidabad railway station =

Railway station in Pakistan

Quaidabad Railway Station قائدآباد ریلوے اسٹیشن

General information
- Owner: Ministry of Railways
- Line: Sangla Hill–Kundian Branch Line

Other information
- Station code: QDG

Services
Preceding station	Pakistan Railways	Following station
Bijjar towards Sangla Hill Junction	Sangla Hill–Kundian Branch Line	Wanbhacharan towards Kundian Junction
Location

Quaidabad Railway Station (Urdu: قائدآباد ریلوے اسٹیشن) is located in Pakistan.

== See also ==
- List of railway stations in Pakistan
- Pakistan Railways
