= Shaheenabad Junction railway station =

Railway station in Pakistan

Shahinabad Junction Station شاہین آباد جنکشن اسٹیشن

General information
- Coordinates: 31.9202°N 72.6360°E
- Owner: Ministry of Railways
- Lines: Shorkot–Lalamusa Branch Line; Sangla Hill–Kundian Branch Line

Construction
- Parking: Available
- Accessible: Available

Other information
- Station code: SHND

Services
Preceding station	Pakistan Railways	Following station
Aladana towards Shorkot Cantonment Junction	Shorkot–Lalamusa Branch Line	Pindi Rasul towards Lala Musa Junction
Lalian towards Sangla Hill Junction	Sangla Hill–Kundian Branch Line	Pindi Rasul towards Kundian Junction
Location

Shaheenabad Junction Railway Station (Urdu: شاہین آباد جنکشن ریلوے اسٹیشن) is a junction railway station located in Sargodha District, Punjab, Pakistan.

== See also ==
- List of railway stations in Pakistan
- Pakistan Railways
