= Chak Sher Muhammad railway station =

Railway station in Pakistan

Chak Sher Muhammad Station چک شیر محمد اسٹیشن

General information
- Coordinates: 32.613°N 73.6248°E
- Owner: Ministry of Railways
- Line: Shorkot–Lalamusa Branch Line

Services
| Preceding station | Pakistan Railways | Following station |
|---|---|---|
| Chillianwala towards Shorkot Cantonment Junction | Shorkot–Lalamusa Branch Line | Dinga towards Lala Musa Junction |
Location

Chak Sher Muhammad Railway Station (Urdu: چک شیر محمد اسٹیشن) is a station in Chak Sher Muhammad village, Mandi Bahauddin district, Punjab, Pakistan.
