= Khanora railway station =

Former railway station in Pakistan

Khanora Railway Station خانورا ریلوے اسٹیشن

General information
- Coordinates: 30.8813°N 72.2614°E
- Owner: Ministry of Railways
- Line: Shorkot–Lalamusa Branch Line

Other information
- Station code: KFR

Services
Preceding station	Pakistan Railways	Following station
Shorkot Cantonment Junction Terminus	Shorkot–Lalamusa Branch Line	Waryam towards Lala Musa Junction
Location

Khanora Railway Station (Urdu: خانورا ریلوے اسٹیشن) was a railway station located in Pakistan.

== History ==
Khanora railway station was built in 1904 during British India era. In December 2018, the railway station was demolished.

== See also ==
- List of railway stations in Pakistan
- Pakistan Railways
