= Keshav Malik =

Indian poet

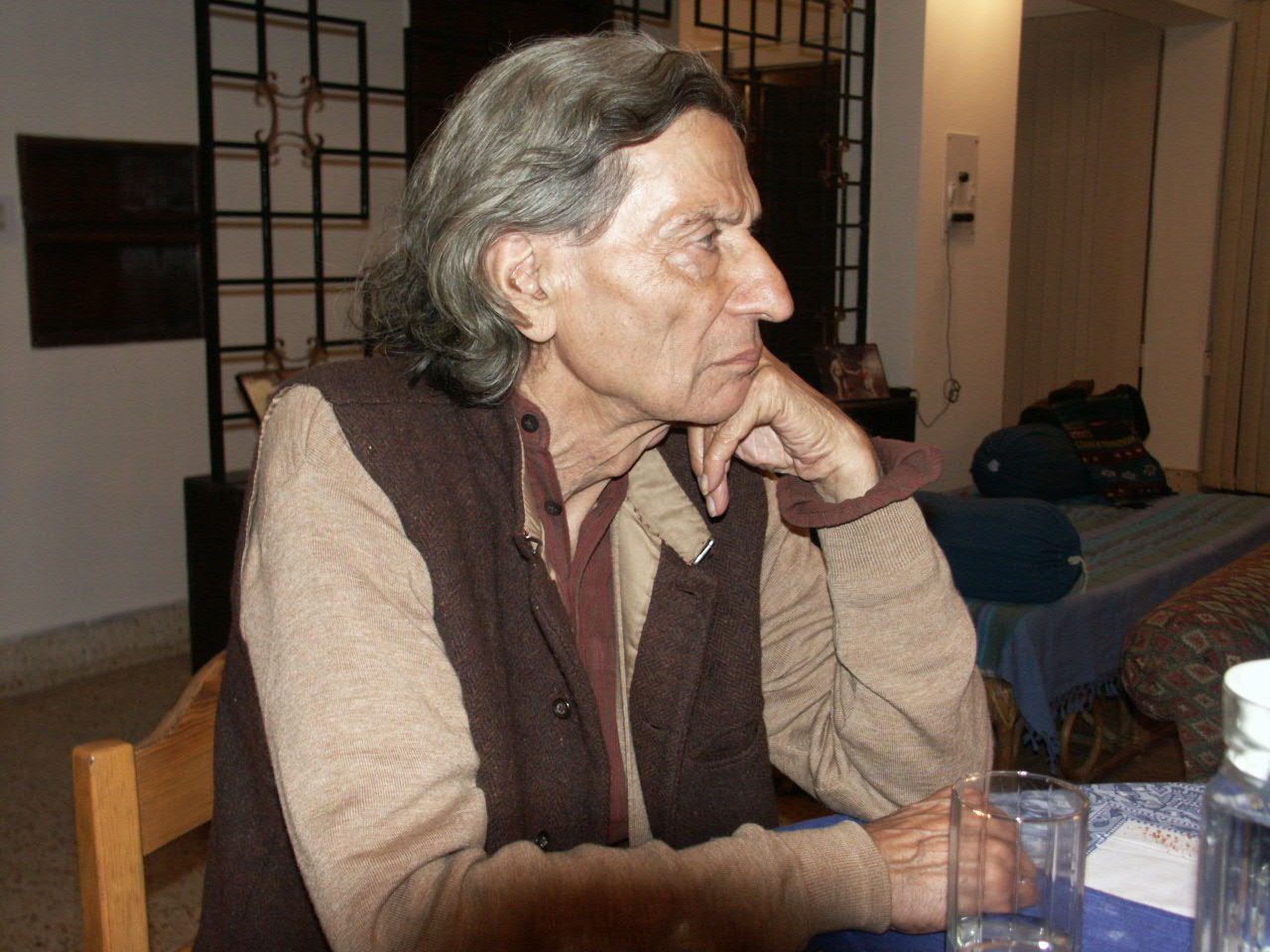
Keshav Malik, November 2003.

Keshav Malik (5 November 1924 – 11 June 2014) was an Indian poet, art and literary critic, arts scholar, and curator. He remained art critic for the Hindustan Times (1960–1972) and The Times of India (1975–2000). He published eighteen volumes of poetry and edited six anthologies of English translations of Indian poetry.

He was awarded the Padma Shri, the fourth highest civilian award in India, for his contribution to literature. In 2004, the Lalit Kala Akademi, India's National Academy of Art, made him a Fellow of the Lalit Kala Akademi for lifetime contribution, which is its highest award.

== Early life and background ==
Malik was born in the town of Miani, now in the Punjab, Pakistan, but at the time it was part of British India. His younger sister is arts and dance scholar Kapila Vatsyayan and brother Bhashi Malik. He is also related to the brothers Balraj Sahni and Bhisham Sahni.

He grew up in Srinagar, Kashmir, where he graduated from the Amar Singh College, Srinagar in 1945. From 1947 to 1948, he was a personal assistant to Jawaharlal Nehru. During the 1950s, Malik studied Renaissance art in Florence, French at the Sorbonne, and attended lectures at Columbia University.

== Career ==
From 1960 to 1972, Malik was art critic for The Hindustan Times. During the 1950s, he was literary editor of Thought, a weekly Indian journal of the arts. In 1973–74, Malik was curator for "The Human Condition," an exhibition of contemporary Indian art that travelled to Bulgaria, Poland, Belgium, and Yugoslavia. From 1975 to 2000, Malik was art critic for The Times of India.

Malik has published 18 volumes of poetry, including The Lake Surface and Other Poems, Storm Warning, and Between Nobodies and Stars. He has also edited six anthologies of English translations of Indian poetry, and is a frequent lecturer and seminar participant. He co-founded the Poetry Society of India and was the president of the Poetry Club of India. He also remained an advisor to the National Gallery of Modern Art and an executive board member to the Lalit Kala Akademi.

Malik was awarded the Padma Shri for literature in 1991, given by the Government of India.

Keshav Malik also wrote "Attars of Existence" based on the abstract works of Sudip Roy.

He has also been the subject of two documentaries, Keshav Malik – The Truth of Art and Keshav Malik – A Look Back.

Malik died at age 89 at his home in New Delhi on 11 June 2014. He was survived by his wife Usha.

== Bibliography ==
- Poems Writers Workshop, India. 1971
