= HYN =

HYN may refer to:

- Haryanwala railway station, in Pakistan
- Hyndland railway station, in Glasgow, Scotland
- Taizhou Luqiao Airport, in Zhejiang Province, China
