= Mandi Bahauddin railway station =

Railway station in Mandi Bahauddin, Pakistan

Mandi Bahauddin Station منڈی بہاؤ الدین ریلوے اسٹیشن

General information
- Coordinates: 32.5884°N 73.4924°E
- Owner: Ministry of Railways
- Line: Shorkot–Lalamusa Branch Line

Construction
- Structure type: Standard (on ground station)
- Parking: Available
- Accessible: Available

Other information
- Station code: MBDN

History
- Opened: 1916

Services
Preceding station	Pakistan Railways	Following station
Hariah towards Shorkot Cantonment Junction	Shorkot–Lalamusa Branch Line	Chillianwala towards Lala Musa Junction
Location

Mandi Bahauddin Railway Station (Urdu: منڈی بہاؤ الدین ریلوے اسٹیشن) is located in Mandi Bahauddin city, Mandi Bahauddin district of Punjab province of the Pakistan.

== See also ==
- List of railway stations in Pakistan
- Pakistan Railways
