= Pakhowal railway station =

Railway station in Pakistan

Pakhowal Railway Station پکھووال ریلوے اسٹیشن

General information
- Coordinates: 32.4794°N 73.1162°E
- Owner: Ministry of Railways
- Line: Shorkot–Lalamusa Branch Line

Other information
- Station code: PHL

Services
Preceding station	Pakistan Railways	Following station
Pind Mukko towards Shorkot Cantonment Junction	Shorkot–Lalamusa Branch Line	Bana Mianwala Halt towards Lala Musa Junction
Location

Pakhowal Railway Station (Urdu: پکھووال ریلوے اسٹیشن) is located in Pakistan.

== See also ==
- List of railway stations in Pakistan
- Pakistan Railways
