= CKJ =

CKJ may refer to:

- Congregation Kehilath Jeshurun, a synagogue in New York
- Chak Jhumra Junction railway station (code CKJ), a station in Pakistan

== See also ==
- CJK, the set of writing characters in Chinese, Japanese and Korean
