= Pind Mukko railway station =

Railway station in Pakistan

Pind Mukko Railway Station پنڈ مکو ریلوے اسٹیشن

General information
- Coordinates: 32.4516°N 73.0914°E
- Owner: Ministry of Railways
- Line: Shorkot–Lalamusa Branch Line

Other information
- Station code: PIM

Services
Preceding station	Pakistan Railways	Following station
Mona towards Shorkot Cantonment Junction	Shorkot–Lalamusa Branch Line	Pakhowal towards Lala Musa Junction
Location

Pind Mukko Railway Station (Urdu: پنڈ مکو ریلوے اسٹیشن) is located in Pakistan.

== See also ==
- List of railway stations in Pakistan
- Pakistan Railways
