= Burj railway station =

Railway station in Pakistan

Burj Railway Station برج ریلوے اسٹیشن

General information
- Coordinates: 31.6585°N 73.0983°E
- Owner: Ministry of Railways
- Line: Sangla Hill–Kundian Branch Line

Other information
- Station code: BURJ

Services
Preceding station	Pakistan Railways	Following station
Chak Jhumra Junction towards Sangla Hill Junction	Sangla Hill–Kundian Branch Line	Chiniot towards Kundian Junction
Location

Burj Railway Station (Urdu: برج ریلوے اسٹیشن) is located in Pakistan.

== See also ==
- List of railway stations in Pakistan
- Pakistan Railways
