= Mona railway station =

Railway station in Pakistan

Mona Railway Station مونا ریلوے اسٹیشن

General information
- Coordinates: 32.4213°N 73.0648°E
- Owner: Ministry of Railways
- Line: Shorkot–Lalamusa Branch Line

Other information
- Station code: MOV

Services
| Preceding station | Pakistan Railways | Following station |
|---|---|---|
| Ratto Kala towards Shorkot Cantonment Junction | Shorkot–Lalamusa Branch Line | Pind Mukko towards Lala Musa Junction |
Location

Mona Railway Station (Urdu: مونا ریلوے اسٹیشن) is located in Pakistan.

== See also ==
- List of railway stations in Pakistan
- Pakistan Railways
