= Haryanwala railway station =

Railway station in Pakistan

Haryanwala Railway Station ہریانوالہ ریلوے اسٹیشن

General information
- Coordinates: 31.7675°N 72.4659°E
- Owner: Ministry of Railways
- Line: Shorkot–Lalamusa Branch Line

Other information
- Station code: HYN

Services
Preceding station	Pakistan Railways	Following station
Sobhaga towards Shorkot Cantonment Junction	Shorkot–Lalamusa Branch Line	Sillanwali towards Lala Musa Junction
Location

Haryanwala Railway Station (Urdu: ہریانوالہ ریلوے اسٹیشن) is located in Pakistan.

== See also ==
- List of railway stations in Pakistan
- Pakistan Railways
