= Karnana, Gujrat =

Town in Gujrat, Pakistan

Karnana U/C 73 کرنانہ
- Town/Village/Union Council
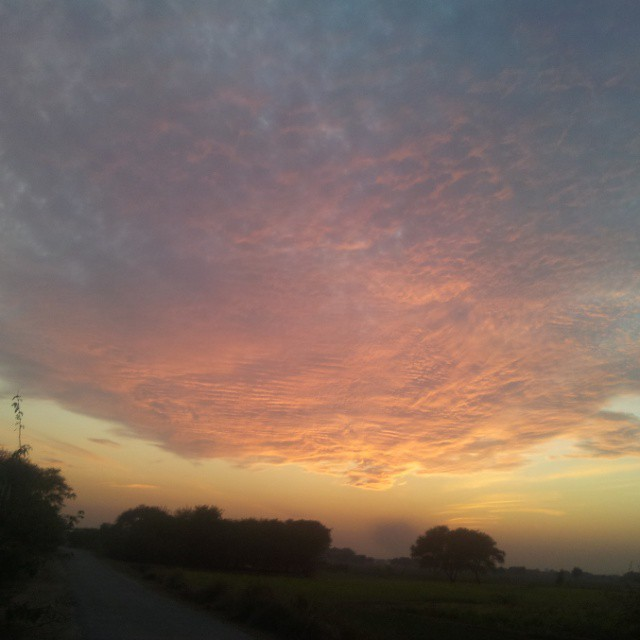
- View of a sunset from Karnana
- Nickname: Akhtar Karnana
- Interactive map of Karnana
- Coordinates: 32°39′35″N 73°52′00″E
- Country: Pakistan
- Province: Punjab
- Division: Gujrat
- District: Gujrat
- Tehsil: Kharian
- Elevation: 233 m (764 ft)
- Demonym: Karnania

Languages
  - Local/Provincial: Punjabi
- Time zone: UTC+5 (PK.ST)
- Postal code: 50700
- Calling code: 053
- Vehicle registration: GT
- Number of Villages in Union: 7
- Number of union councils: 1
- HDI: 1
- Website: http://punjab.gov.pk/

Karnana (Urdu: کرنانہ), also known as Akhtar Karnana, is a town and Union Council # 73 of Gujrat District in the Punjab province of Pakistan. The town has a population of over 20,000 people. It is located at 32°39'35"N, 73°52'0"E and has an elevation of 233 metres (767 feet) above sea level.

== History ==
After the decline of the Mughal Empire, the region of Gujrat District, including Karnana, became subject to various invasions, including that of the Sikhs. The area saw significant shifts in governance and cultural influence during this time. During the British colonial era, Hafiz Ghulam Muhammad of Karnana emerged as a prominent landlord. He was not only a respected political leader but also a religious and spiritual figure. Known for his herbal medicine practices, Hafiz Ghulam Muhammad played an important role in defending the local Muslim community of Karnana from the growing influence and population of the Hindu Khatri of Gujrat District, a group that had expanded both in size and power during the period.Hafiz Ghulam Muhammad Khatana was father of Ch Sultan Ali , a political companion of former President of Pakistan Ch Fazal Elahi and grandfather of Ch Akhtar Ali Karnana.

The partition of the Indian subcontinent in 1947 led to the mass migration of Hindus and Sikhs to India, while Muslim refugees from India settled in the Gujrat District, including in Karnana. This transformation reshaped the demographic makeup of the village, with the majority of families in Karnana today being Muslim.

== Geography ==
On the north side of the village is the Lalamusa-Dinga Road, which connects Karnana to these two cities.

On the east side of Karnana are the small villages of Lambor, Bhola, Umar Chak and Jalaldin, and Lalamusa City are Sukh Chainah are to the north. Rakdand, Miana Chak, Jaura, Ghurko, Dhola, Pir Jand and Dinga City are to the west of Karnana. To the south of the town are Chechian, Babanian, Ranian and Paal.

== Transportation ==
The Shorkot–Lalamusa Branch Line of Pakistan Railways passes through Akhtar Karnana railway station, linking Lalamusa, Dinga, Mandi Bahauddin, Bhalwal, Sargodha and Shorkot. Karnana is also connected to Peshawar and Karachi via Pakistan Railways.

Ch Akhtar Ali Karnana and Muhammad Munir Mughal had constructed the railway station (Urdu: اختر کرنانہ ریلوے اسٹیشن) in 1984, and are still taking care of it, even though the train service is available.

Nowadays, people prefer to travel on rickshaws or using their personal vehicles.

== Mosques ==
Jamia Al-Madinah Masjid, Karnana

There are approximately fourteen mosques in Karnana, with two mosques not yet constructed.

=== Grand (Jamia) mosques ===
- Central Mosque
- Al–Madina Mosque
- Quba Mosque

==== Other mosques ====
- Ghosia Al-Rehmat Mosque
- Habib Mosque
- Husnain Tayyaban Mosque
- Ali Mosque
- Abu-Bakr Siddque Mosque
- Noor Mosque
- Mustafa Mosque
- Nasib Mosque (work in progress)
- Mosque of High School

== Education ==
=== Government schools ===
- Govt. Boys High School Karnana
- Govt. Boys Primary School Karnana
- Govt. Girls Elementary School Karnana

=== Private schools ===
- The Educators (Abdul Shakoor campus)
- Noor Public Girls Model High School Karnana
- Kinza Public Girls High School Karnana
- Mustafai Public Girls High School

== Notable people ==
Chaudhry Akhtar Ali Khatana, a generous and humble individual from Karnana, played a significant role in the construction of the village's railway station, both physically and financially. In recognition of his contributions, the station was named after him, and the village has sometimes been referred to as 'Akhtar Karnana.' Additionally, Late Mian Muhammad Afzal Hayat, a prominent politician from the (PTI), served as an MPA and the Caretaker Chief Minister of Punjab in the 1990s (source). He was believed to have ancestral roots in Karnana. Chaudhry Akhtar Ali Khatana’s contributions to the village can be seen in this Facebook post showing him at the inauguration of a train route passing through Railway station Akhtar Karnana.

== See also ==
- Chachian ranian
