= JRH =

JRH may refer to:

- Jaurah Karnana railway station, by Pakistan Railways station code
- Jewish Rehabilitation Hospital, a bilingual hospital in Laval, Quebec, Canada
- Jorhat Airport, Assam, India, by IATA airport code
