= Dinga railway station =

Railway station in Pakistan

Dinga Railway Station ڈنگہ ریلوے اسٹیشن
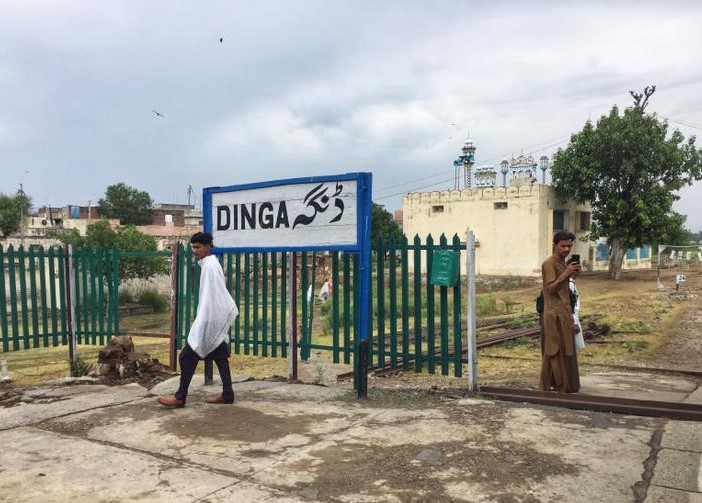

General information
- Coordinates: 32.6308°N 73.7184°E
- Owner: Ministry of Railways
- Line: Shorkot–Lalamusa Branch Line

Other information
- Station code: DGH

Services
| Preceding station | Pakistan Railways | Following station |
|---|---|---|
| Chak Sher Muhammad towards Shorkot Cantonment Junction | Shorkot–Lalamusa Branch Line | Pir Jand Halt towards Lala Musa Junction |
Location

Dinga Railway Station (Urdu: ڈنگہ ریلوے اسٹیشن) is located in Pakistan.

== See also ==
- List of railway stations in Pakistan
- Pakistan Railways
