= Haryanvi language =

Indo-Aryan language spoken in Haryana, India

Haryanvi
- हरियाणवी
- The word "Hariyāṇavī" written in Devanagari script
- Native to: India, Pakistan
- Region: Haryana, Delhi, Punjab, Sindh (Note: For the Rangri dialect of Haryanvi spoken in Pakistan.)
- Ethnicity: Haryanvi
- Native speakers: 9.8 million (2011)
- Language family: Indo-European: Indo-Iranian; Indo-Aryan; Central Zone; Western Hindi; Haryanvi
- Writing system: Devanagari, Nastaliq

Language codes
- ISO 639-3: bgc
- Glottolog: hary1238
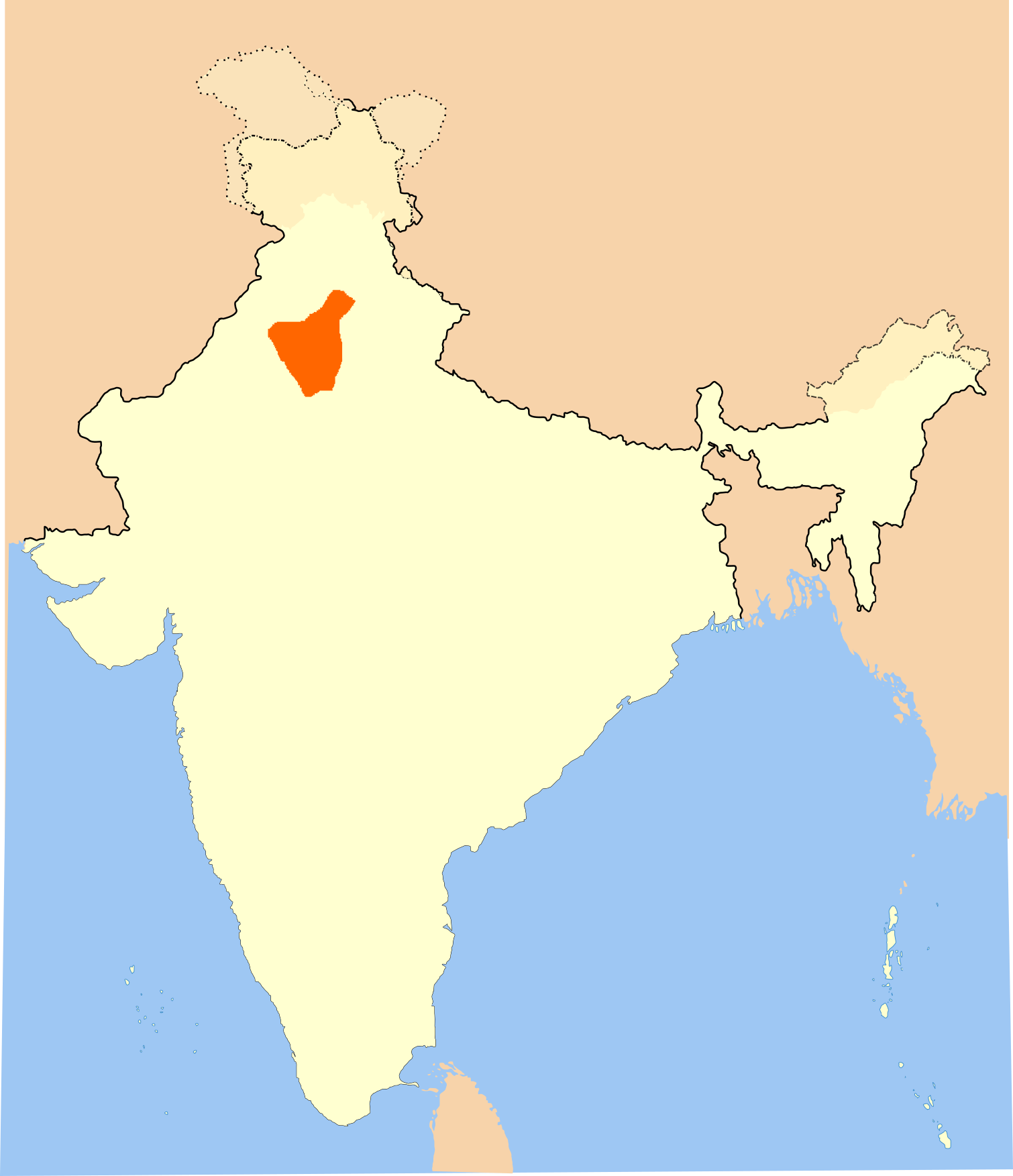
- Distribution of native Haryanvi speakers in India

Haryanvi (हरियाणवी or हरयाणवी) is an Indo-Aryan language spoken primarily in the Indian state of Haryana. It is considered to be part of the dialect group of Western Hindi, which also includes Khariboli and Braj. It is written in the Devanagari script.

Apart from Haryana, Haryanvi is also spoken in the territory of Delhi. The Rangri dialect of Haryanvi of the Ranghar community is still spoken by Muhajir emigres in the Pakistani provinces of Punjab and Sindh, though it has become extinct within Haryana itself. The dialect is written in the Nastaliq variant of the Perso-Arabic script.

== Phonology ==
Vowels
	Front		Central	Back	
	short	long	Central	short	long
Close	ɪ	iː		ʊ	uː
Close-mid		eː	ə		oː
Open-mid		ɛː	ə		ɔː
Open		æː			ɑː

Each vowel has a nasal counterpart.

Consonants
		Labial	Dental/ Alveolar	Retroflex	Postalveolar/ Palatal	Velar	Glottal
Nasal	plain	m	n̪	ɳ	ɲ	(ŋ)	
Nasal	breathy	mʱ	n̪ʱ	ɳʱ			
Stop/ Affricate	aspirated	pʰ	t̪ʰ	ʈʰ	t͡ɕʰ	kʰ	
Stop/ Affricate	breathy	bʱ	d̪ʱ	ɖʱ	d͡ʑʱ	ɡʱ	
Stop/ Affricate	voiceless	p	t̪	ʈ	t͡ɕ	k	
Stop/ Affricate	voiced	b	d̪	ɖ	d͡ʑ	ɡ	
Fricative	voiceless	f	s				
Fricative	voiced	v	(z)				
Tap	plain		ɾ	ɽ			
Tap	breathy			ɽʱ			
Lateral	plain		l	𝼈			
Lateral	breathy			𝼈ʱ			
Trill			r				
Approximant					j		ɦ

== Rangri dialect ==
After Partition, 1.2 million Haryanvi-speaking Muslims migrated from Haryana and Delhi in India to Pakistan. Today in Pakistan, it is a "mother tongue" of millions of Muley Jat and Ranghar Muslims. They live in thousands of villages in Punjab, Pakistan, and hundreds of villages in Sindh and all over Pakistan. After the independence of Pakistan in 1947, many Uttar Pradesh Ranghars also migrated to Sindh in Pakistan and mostly settling in Karachi.

These people have settled down mainly in the districts of Lahore, Sheikhupura, Bhakkar, Bahawalnagar, Rahim Yar Khan District (specially in Khanpur tehsil), Okara, Layyah, Vehari, Sahiwal, Phullarwan in Sargodha District and Multan of Punjab. In districts of Pakpattan, Okara, and Bahawalnagar which have the densest concentrations of Rāngrri Speakers, they consist mostly of small peasants, with many serving in the army, police and Civil Services. They maintain an overarching tribal council (panchayat in the Rānghari language), which deals with a number of issues, such as punishments for petty crime or co-operation over village projects. Haryanvi Speakers are also found in Mirpur Khas and Nawabshah Districts of Sindh. Most Ranghar are now bilingual, speaking Urdu language as National. Punjabi, Saraiki and Sindhi as Regional, as well as still speaking Rāngrri language as "First Language" or "Mother Language" or "Village Language" or "Community language".

A large number of Ranghars are also found in the capital city of Islamabad. They speak Urdu with Rāngrri accent. Muley Jats, in addition, the Odh community in Pakistan also speak Rānghari as their mother tongue.

A tale of unwavering friendship and integrity, where one's devotion protects his friend’s honour and silences a village’s suspicion.

== In popular culture ==
Bollywood films like Dangal, Sultan, and Tanu Weds Manu: Returns have used the Haryanvi culture and language as the backdrop of their films. These movies have received warm appreciation throughout India and abroad. As a result, some non-native speakers have shown an interest in learning the language.Haryanvi has successfully made its presence count into Indian cinema, TV, popular music albums and academia, with the influence of Haryana in the fields of sports, Bollywood, defense, industrialization and politics. The Haryanvi language and culture has also been promoted in significant proportion.

The character Virendra Pratap Singh of the show Molkki (2020-2022), played by Amar Upadhyay, speaks Haryanvi.

== In local culture ==
Haryanvi has a rich collection of oral culture including folk songs, tales, and oral history. These are practiced by Haryanvi speakers on special occasions as well as in everyday life.

Haryanvi folk song sung by a native speaker

== See also ==
- List of people from Haryana
- Haryanvi cinema
  - List of Haryanvi-language films
- Haryanvi culture
- Haryanvi music
- Haryanvi people
- Music of Haryana
