= Chiniot railway station =

Railway station in Punjab, Pakistan

Coordinates: 31.7319°N 72.9835°E

Chiniot Railway Station چینوٹ ریلوے اسٹیشن
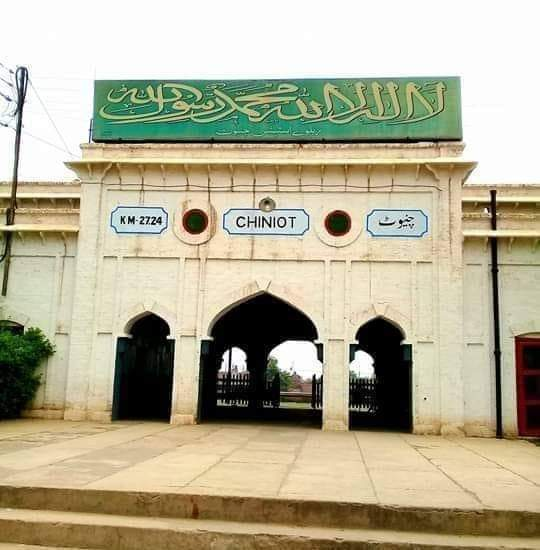

General information
- Owner: Ministry of Railways
- Line: Sangla Hill–Kundian Branch Line

Construction
- Parking: Available
- Accessible: Available

Other information
- Station code: CHOT

History
- Opened: 1927

Services
Preceding station	Pakistan Railways	Following station
Burj towards Sangla Hill Junction	Sangla Hill–Kundian Branch Line	Chenab Nagar towards Kundian Junction
Location

Chinot Railway Station (Urdu: چینوٹ ریلوے اسٹیشن) is located in Chiniot, Punjab, Pakistan on the Sangla Hill–Kundian Branch Line. It was built in 1927. In this plain region of central Punjab, the train passes through the Kirana Hills near the Chenab River and crosses the river via the two-section Chiniot Bridge.

Chiniot city is connected to Sargodha, Malakwal, Lalamusa, Faisalabad, Khanewal, Jahanian, Bahawalpur, Rahim Yar Khan, Nawabshah, Hyderabad, and Karachi via the Millat Express, while it is linked to Lahore, Sangla Hill, Khushab, Kundian, Mianwali, and Mari Indus via the Mianwali Express.

== See also ==
- Chiniot
- Chiniot District
