= Jhang Sadar railway station =

Railway station in Pakistan

Jhang Sadar Railway Station
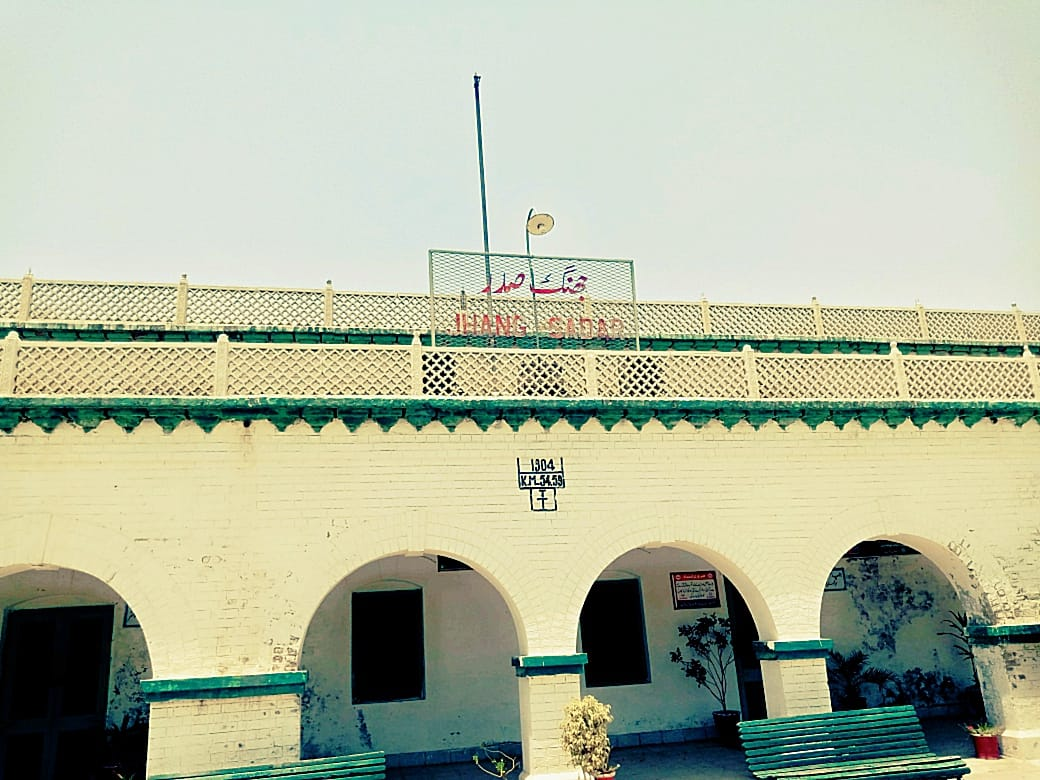

General information
- Coordinates: 31.2602°N 72.3263°E
- Owner: Ministry of Railways
- Line: Shorkot–Lalamusa Branch Line

Construction
- Parking: Available
- Accessible: Available

Other information
- Station code: JGH

History
- Opened: 1904

Services
Preceding station	Pakistan Railways	Following station
Mudduki towards Shorkot Cantonment Junction	Shorkot–Lalamusa Branch Line	Jhang City towards Lala Musa Junction
Location

Jhang Sadar Railway Station (Urdu: جھنگ صدر ریلوے اسٹیشن) is located in Jhang city of Punjab province, Pakistan on the Shorkot–Lalamusa Branch Line.

== See also ==
- Jhang District
- List of railway stations in Pakistan
- Pakistan Railways
