= Ajnala railway station =

Railway station in Pakistan

Ajnala Railway Station اجنالہ ریلوے اسٹیشن

General information
- Coordinates: 32.2023°N 72.8263°E
- Owner: Ministry of Railways
- Line: Shorkot–Lalamusa Branch Line

Other information
- Station code: AAJ

Services
Preceding station	Pakistan Railways	Following station
Mitha Lak towards Shorkot Cantonment Junction	Shorkot–Lalamusa Branch Line	Qudratabad towards Lala Musa Junction
Location

Ajnala Railway Station (Urdu: اجنالہ ریلوے اسٹیشن) is located in Pakistan.

== See also ==
- List of railway stations in Pakistan
- Pakistan Railways
