= Lalian railway station =

Railway station in Punjab, Pakistan

Lalian Railway Station لالیاں ریلوے اسٹیشن

General information
- Coordinates: 31.8240°N 72.8104°E
- Owner: Ministry of Railways
- Line: Sangla Hill–Kundian Branch Line

Other information
- Station code: LLAN

Services
Preceding station	Pakistan Railways	Following station
Chenab Nagar towards Sangla Hill Junction	Sangla Hill–Kundian Branch Line	Shahinabad Junction towards Kundian Junction
Location

Lalian Railway Station (Urdu: لالیاں اسٹیشن) is located in Pakistan.

== See also ==
- List of railway stations in Pakistan
- Pakistan Railways
