= Bana Mianwala Halt railway station =

Train station in Pakistan

Bana Mianwala Halt Station بنہ میانوالہ ہالٹ اسٹیشن

General information
- Coordinates: 32.5052°N 73.1386°E
- Owner: Ministry of Railways
- Line: Shorkot–Lalamusa Branch Line

Other information
- Station code: BMWL

Services
Preceding station	Pakistan Railways	Following station
Pakhowal towards Shorkot Cantonment Junction	Shorkot–Lalamusa Branch Line	Chak Saida towards Lala Musa Junction
Location

Bana Mianwala Halt Railway Station (Urdu: بنہ میانوالہ ہالٹ ریلوے اسٹیشن) is located in Pakistan.

== See also ==
- List of railway stations in Pakistan
- Pakistan Railways
