= Phularwan railway station =

Railway station in Pakistan

Phularwan Railway Station پھلروان ریلوے اسٹیشن

General information
- Coordinates: 32.3581°N 73.0091°E
- Owner: Ministry of Railways
- Line: Shorkot–Lalamusa Branch Line

Other information
- Station code: PHW

Services
Preceding station	Pakistan Railways	Following station
Wil Sonpur towards Shorkot Cantonment Junction	Shorkot–Lalamusa Branch Line	Ratto Kala towards Lala Musa Junction
Location

Phularwan Railway Station (Urdu: پھلروان ریلوے اسٹیشن) is located in Pakistan.

== See also ==
- List of railway stations in Pakistan
- Pakistan Railways
