= Shahpur City railway station =

Railway station in Pakistan

Shahpur City Railway Station

General information
- Coordinates: 32.2916°N 72.4301°E
- Owner: Ministry of Railways
- Line: Sangla Hill–Kundian Branch Line

Other information
- Station code: SHPC

History
- Former names: Great Indian Peninsula Railway
Location

Shahpur City Railway Station (Urdu: شاہ پور شہر ریلوے اسٹیشن) is located in Pakistan.

== See also ==
- Pakistan Railways
