= SWY =

SWY or swy may refer to:

- SWY, the IATA code for Sitiawan Airport, Perak, Malaysia
- SWY, the Ministry of Railways station code for Sillanwali railway station, Pakistan
- SWY, the National Rail station code for Sway railway station, Hampshire, England
- swy, the ISO 639-3 code for Sarua language, Chad
- Swy, another name for the Australian gambling game two-up
