= Chachian ranian =

Village in Gujrat District, Pakistan

Chachian is an old village in Karnana Union Council in Gujrat District, Pakistan.

== Geography ==
It is located at 32°40'0N 73°52'0E and has an altitude of 233 meters (767 feet). Nearby villages are Rakhdhand, Ranian, Babanian, Sagar Dariwal and Karnana. The distance between Chachian and Islamabad is 161 km.

== People ==
The population of Chachian ranian approximately consists of 12,000 inhabitants.

People from Chachian are utilizing their potentials in different professions of life like, advocacy, Teaching, Medical Research, Medicine, UNICEF, Computer Science, Engineering, Accounting, Civil Service, Commerce, Army, Police, Driving, business and many more.

== Religion ==
There are five mosques in the village including the big "Jameya Masjid". Upper Jhelum Canal flows just near Chachian.

== Transportation ==
People from Chachian use different sort of travelling ways like Cars, Motor bikes, Cycles, Taxi, Buss, Rickshaws, small van and the most common way through trains. Jaurah Karnana railways station is the nearest railways station from where people like to pick the train for closing cities like Lalamusa, Dinga, Gujrat and Kharian. There are three schools in Chachian, that are boys primary school Sohail Akram Foundation and Girls Middle Standard School. People from Chachian are in almost all parts of the globe especially in Kuwait, Saudi Arabia, UAE Greece, Italy, Spain, UK, USA, Sweden, France, Canada and in many more. Like in other parts of Gujrat, people from Chachian use to go to foreign for better life styles, more income and to support their families. Cricket and Volleyball are very common games in Chachian.

== Facilities ==
There are five mosques in the village including the big "Jameya Masjid". Upper Jhelum Canal flows just near Chachian. Jaurah Karnana railway station is the nearest railways station from where people like to pick the train for closing cities like Lalamusa, Dinga, Gujrat and Kharian. There are three schools including Boys Primary School Sohail Akram Foundation and Girls High School.
