= Lakhnewala Halt railway station =

Railway station in Pakistan

General information
- Owner: Ministry of Railways

Other information
- Station code: LKWL

History
- Former names: Great Indian Peninsula Railway

Lakhnewala Halt railway station (Urdu: لکھنی والا ہالٹ ریلوے اسٹیشن) is located in Lakhnewala, Mandi Bahauddin district Pakistan.

== See also ==
- List of railway stations in Pakistan
- Pakistan Railways
