= Ratto Kala railway station =

Railway station in Pakistan

Ratto Kala Railway Station رتو کالا ریلوے اسٹیشن

General information
- Coordinates: 32.3969°N 73.0432°E
- Owner: Ministry of Railways
- Line: Shorkot–Lalamusa Branch Line

Other information
- Station code: RTK

Services
| Preceding station | Pakistan Railways | Following station |
|---|---|---|
| Phularwan towards Shorkot Cantonment Junction | Shorkot–Lalamusa Branch Line | Mona towards Lala Musa Junction |
Location

Ratto Kala Railway Station (Urdu: رتو کالا ریلوے اسٹیشن) is located in Pakistan.

== See also ==
- List of railway stations in Pakistan
- Pakistan Railways
