= Hariah railway station =

Railway station in Pakistan

Hariah Railway Station ہریا ریلوے اسٹیشن

General information
- Coordinates: 32.5622°N 73.3148°E
- Owner: Ministry of Railways
- Line: Shorkot–Lalamusa Branch Line

Other information
- Station code: HRA

Services
Preceding station	Pakistan Railways	Following station
Fateh Shahpur Halt towards Shorkot Cantonment Junction	Shorkot–Lalamusa Branch Line	Ala towards Lala Musa Junction
Location

Hariah Railway Station (Urdu: ہریا ریلوے اسٹیشن) is located in Pakistan.

== See also ==
- List of railway stations in Pakistan
- Pakistan Railways
- Train Trimmings
