= Jaurah Karnana railway station =

Railway station in Pakistan

Jaurah Karnana Station جوڑه کرنانہ اسٹیشن
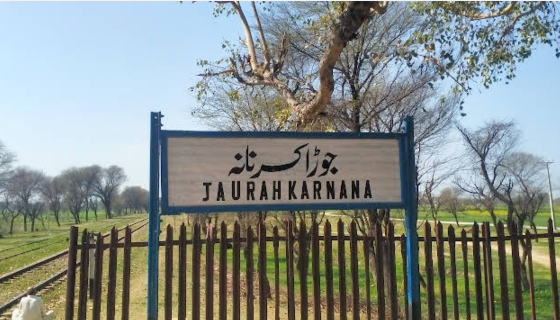

General information
- Coordinates: 32.6562°N 73.8405°E
- Owner: Ministry of Railways
- Line: Shorkot–Lalamusa Branch Line

Other information
- Station code: JRH

Services
Preceding station	Pakistan Railways	Following station
Pir Jand Halt towards Shorkot Cantonment Junction	Shorkot–Lalamusa Branch Line	Akhtar Karnana towards Lala Musa Junction
Location

Jaurah Karnana Railway Station (Urdu: جوڑا کرنانہ ریلوے اسٹیشن) is located in Pakistan.

== See also ==
- List of railway stations in Pakistan
- Pakistan Railways
