= Chak Waraichanwala railway station =

Railway station in Pakistan

Chak Waraichanwala Station چک ورایچاں والا اسٹیشن

General information
- Coordinates: 32.1778°N 72.8082°E
- Owner: Ministry of Railways
- Line: Shorkot–Lalamusa Branch Line

Other information
- Station code: CWW
Location

Chak Waraichanwala railway station (Urdu: چک ورایچاں والا ریلوے اسٹیشن) is located in Pakistan.

== See also ==
- List of railway stations in Pakistan
- Pakistan Railways
