= Bhalwal railway station =

Railway station in Punjab, Pakistan

Bhalwal Railway Station بھلوال ریلوے اسٹیشن
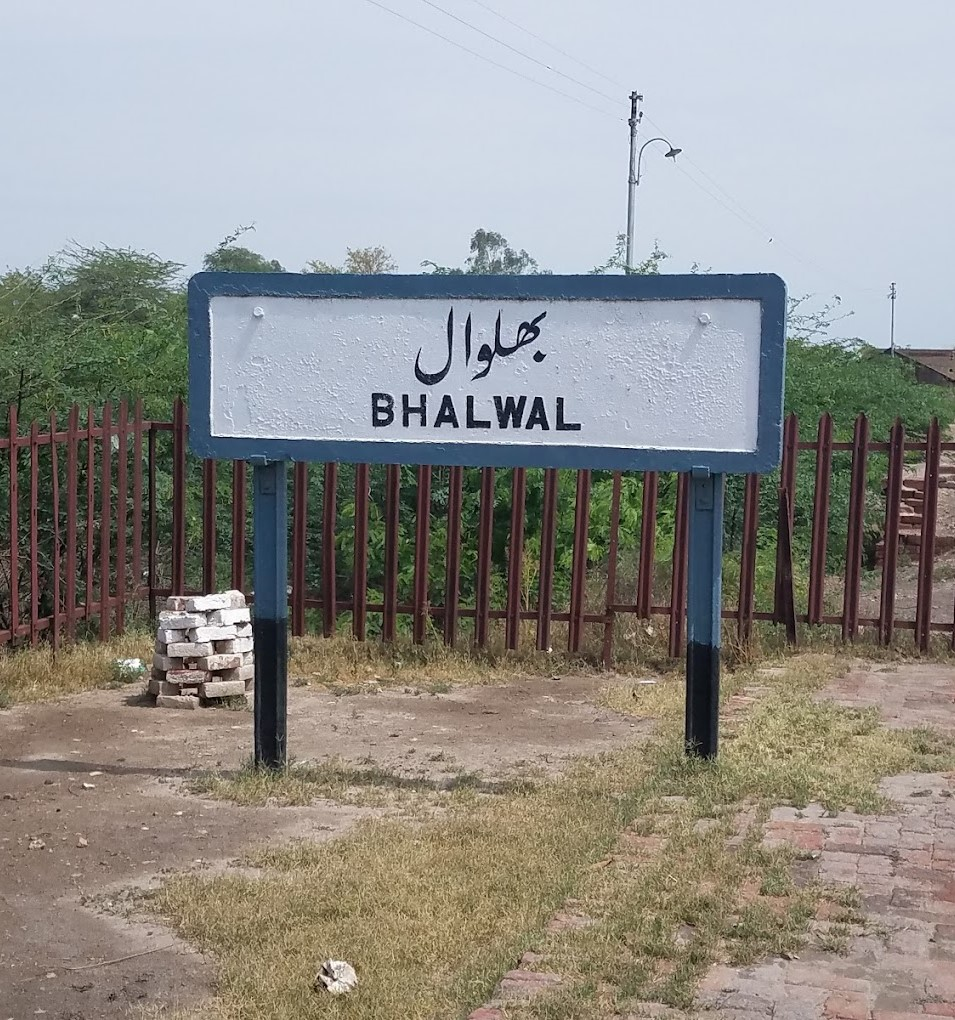

General information
- Coordinates: 32.2649°N 72.9061°E
- Owner: Ministry of Railways

Other information
- Station code: BWQ

Services
| Preceding station | Pakistan Railways | Following station |
|---|---|---|
| Qudratabad towards Shorkot Cantonment Junction | Shorkot–Lalamusa Branch Line | Wil Sonpur towards Lala Musa Junction |
Location

Bhalwal Railway Station (Urdu: بھلوال ریلوے اسٹیشن) is located at Bhalwal, Pakistan.

== See also ==
- List of railway stations in Pakistan
- Pakistan Railways
