= Akhtar Karnana railway station =

Railway station in Panjab, Pakistan

Akhtar Karnana Railway Station اختر کرنانہ ریلوے اسٹیشن
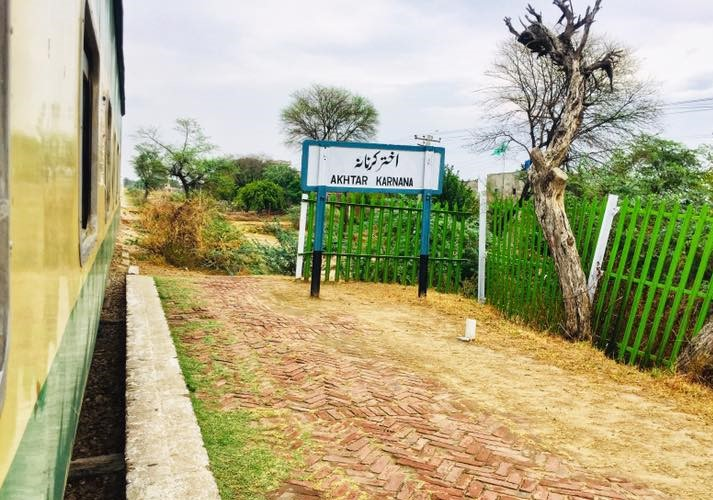

General information
- Coordinates: 32.665786°N 73.873739°E
- Owner: Ministry of Railways
- Line: Shorkot–Lalamusa Branch Line
- Platforms: 1
- Tracks: 1

Construction
- Structure type: Standard (On the Ground)
- Platform levels: Station
- Parking: No

History
- Opened: 26 March 1984

Services
| Preceding station | Pakistan Railways | Following station |
|---|---|---|
| Jaurah Karnana towards Shorkot Cantonment Junction | Shorkot–Lalamusa Branch Line | Lala Musa Junction Terminus |
Location

Akhtar Karnana Railway Station (Urdu: اختر کرنانہ ریلوے اسٹیشن) is located in Karnana town, Gujrat district of Punjab province, Pakistan.

== See also ==
- List of railway stations in Pakistan
- Pakistan Railways
- List of Discontinued Railway lines, Pakistan
