= Chillianwala railway station =

Railway station in Pakistan

Chilianwala Railway Station چیلیاں والا ریلوے اسٹیشن

General information
- Coordinates: 32.6130°N 73.6248°E
- Owner: Ministry of Railways
- Line: Shorkot–Lalamusa Branch Line

Other information
- Station code: CHW

Services
Preceding station	Pakistan Railways	Following station
Mandi Bahauddin towards Shorkot Cantonment Junction	Shorkot–Lalamusa Branch Line	Chak Sher Muhammad towards Lala Musa Junction
Location

Chilianwala Railway Station (Urdu: چیلیاں والا ریلوے اسٹیشن) is a railway station located near Chillianwala in Pakistan. The station is situated nearly 5 km from Chellianwala village and is adjacent to Chak No. 1's main bazaar .

== See also ==
- List of railway stations in Pakistan
- Pakistan Railways
