= Wanbhacharan railway station =

Railway station in Pakistan

Wanbhacharan Station واں بھچراں ریلوے اسٹیشن
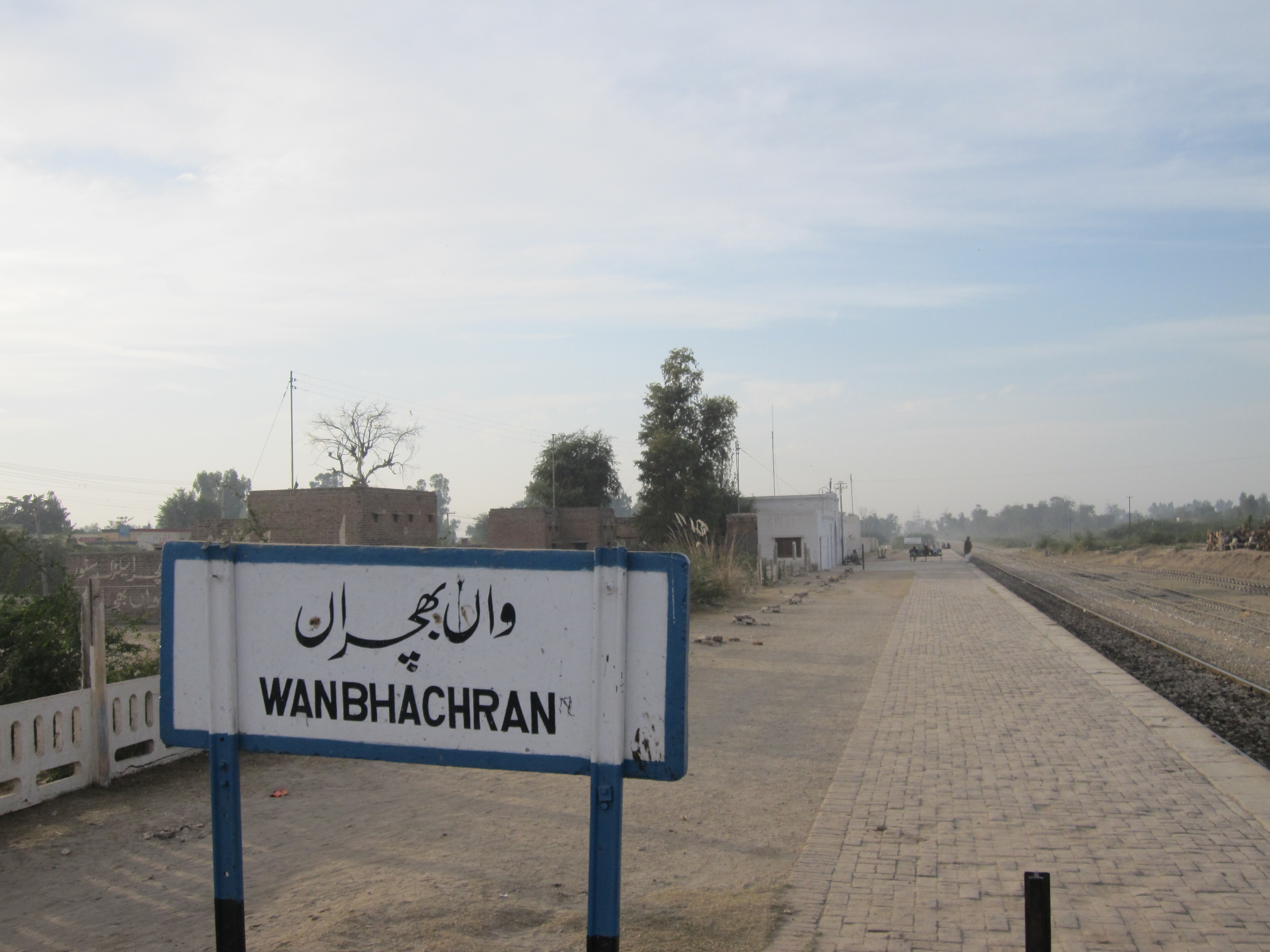

General information
- Coordinates: 32.4199°N 71.6944°E
- Owner: Ministry of Railways
- Line: Sangla Hill–Kundian Branch Line

Other information
- Station code: WBN

Services
Preceding station	Pakistan Railways	Following station
Qaidabad towards Sangla Hill Junction	Sangla Hill–Kundian Branch Line	Kundian Junction Terminus
Location

Wanbhacharan Railway Station (Urdu: واں بھچراں ریلوے اسٹیشن) is located in Wan Bhachran, Pakistan.

== See also ==
- List of railway stations in Pakistan
- Pakistan Railways
