= Lakhnewala =

- Location within Pakistan
- Coordinates: 32.37°N 73.33°E
- Country: Pakistan
- Province: Punjab
- District: Mandi Bahauddin
- Elevation: 222 m (728 ft)
- Time zone: UTC+5 (PST)

Lakhne Wala (also Lakhnanwala) is a village of Mandi Bahauddin District in Punjab, Pakistan, located between River Jhelum and River Chenab. The total area of the village is approximately 119,790,000 sq ft (approx. 11.13 km^{2}) or 2750 acres. It is about 8 km east of the city of Mandi Bahauddin. North are Kot Baloch, Rasul and the Government College of Technology, Rasul. It sits at 222 meters (728 feet) in average elevation.

== Climate ==
The summer begins in April; the hottest months are May, June and July with peak temperatures about 45 °C at noon. Winter begins in October; the coldest months are December through February, with frost in the January and February. Winter days are generally pleasant with maximum and minimum temperatures about 21.5 °C and 5.1 °C, respectively. Annual average rainfall is about 435 mm.

== Population ==
There are approximately 1400 houses in village with a total of about 7500 people. The entire population of the village is Muslim who may attend 6 mosques and 2 madrasahs. 3 womenmadrasahThere are 2100 registered voters, almost 45% of whom are women.

== Economics ==
The majority of the people earn their livelihood through agriculture on the fertile land, using the peter engine method for irrigation. The most important crops are wheat (gandam), rice (chawal), sugarcane (kamad) Watermelon and cotton which together account for more than 75% of the value of total crop output.

There are several bhathas (brick plants) poultry farms and fish farms in the village.

== Infrastructure ==
It is common in most homes to have Pakistan Telecommunication Company Ltd (PTCL) phones or mobile phones, televisions and radios. Almost 80% homes in the village also possess computers with internet access. Frustrated by high electric bills and the inconvenience of load sharing, residents of Lakhnewala decided not to pay their electric bills while realizing that this could result in the disconnection of their electrical service.

There is hospital in the village, a doctor and health care worker.

The village has a Government Boys Primary School, a Government Girls High School, and Three private schools. Almost every child of the village goes to school.
