= Phularwan =

Phularwan پهُلروان
- City
- Location Phularwan (Pakistan)
- Coordinates: 32°11′18″N 73°01′43″E
- Country: Pakistan
- Province: Punjab
- Division: Sargodha
- District: Sargodha

Population (2017)
  - Total: 22,184

Phularwan (Urdu: پهُلروان) is a city located in the Sargodha District of Punjab province, Pakistan. It is a part of the tehsil of Bhalwal. It is the terminus of a branch of the North-Western railway.

== Location ==
Latitude 32° 21' 20.52" N (32.3557), Longitude 73° 00' 44.67" E (73.012408), Phularwan is located on the M-2 (Lahore-Islamabad) motorway at Salam Interchange in Sargodha District. The town is connected to Sargodha-Gujrat Road from two different places from Salam Chowk Via Bhera Phularwan Road, distance is approximately 3 km and secondly from Chakian Phularwan via Phularwan Gujrat Road distance is 4 km. The town's importance increased due to the motorway passing near Phularwan. Phularwan is 50 km from the district capital Sargodha. Now it takes only two hours to reach Phularwan from Lahore, Islamabad, and Faisalabad. A famous depot of the Pakistan Army, Mona depot, is 12 km from Phularwan. Nearby places include Rattokala, village Sidhowal, Dhori and Salam.

== Nearby areas ==
- Chak No 1 NB Ghakra
- Salem
- chakian
- Dhori
- Village Sidhowal
- Ratto Kala railway station
- Bhera
- Davispur
- Miani
