= Munianwala railway station =

Railway station in Pakistan

Coordinates: 31°41′N 73°04′E

General information
- Owner: Ministry of Railways

Other information
- Station code: MNWL
Location

Munianwala railway station (Urdu: منیانوالہ ریلوے اسٹیشن) is located in Pakistan.

Situated near Chiniot district and 13 km from Chiniot, this railway station connects Chiniot with Jhumrah.

== See also ==
- List of railway stations in Pakistan
- Pakistan Railways
