= Hafeezabad railway station =

Railway station in Pakistan

Coordinates: 31.73892°N 72.429935°E

General information
- Owner: Ministry of Railways

Other information
- Station code: HFED

History
- Former names: Great Indian Peninsula Railway
Location

Hafeezabad railway station (Urdu: حفیظ آباد ریلوے اسٹیشن) is located in Pakistan.

== See also ==
- List of railway stations in Pakistan
- Pakistan Railways
