= Rivaz West Bank railway station =

Railway station in Pakistan

Coordinates: 31.407867°N 72.293718°E

General information
- Owner: Ministry of Railways

Other information
- Station code: RWB

History
- Former names: Great Indian Peninsula Railway
Location

Rivaz West Bank railway station (Urdu: ریواز ویسٹ بنک ریلوے اسٹیشن) is located in Pakistan.

== See also ==
- List of railway stations in Pakistan
- Pakistan Railways
