= Tinoka railway station =

Railway station in Pakistan

Coordinates: 31.866168°N 72.731149°E

General information
- Owner: Ministry of Railways

Other information
- Station code: TINK

History
- Former names: Great Indian Peninsula Railway
Location

Tinoka railway station (Urdu: تینوکا ریلوے اسٹیشن) is a railway station located in Pakistan.

== See also ==
- List of railway stations in Pakistan
- Pakistan Railways
