= Ludewala railway station =

Railway station in Pakistan

Coordinates: 32.144051°N 72.651698°E

General information
- Owner: Ministry of Railways

Other information
- Station code: LDWL

History
- Former names: Great Indian Peninsula Railway
Location

Ludewala railway station (Urdu: لوڈےوالا ریلوے اسٹیشن) is an abandoned railway station located in Pakistan.

== See also ==
- List of railway stations in Pakistan
- Pakistan Railways
