= Rivaz East Bank railway station =

Railway station in Pakistan

Coordinates: 31°24′N 72°18′E

General information
- Owner: Ministry of Railways

Other information
- Station code: REB

History
- Former names: Great Indian Peninsula Railway
Location

Rivaz East Bank railway station (Urdu: ریواز ایسٹ بنک ریلوے اسٹیشن) is located in Pakistan.

== See also ==
- List of railway stations in Pakistan
- Pakistan Railways
