= New Jhang =

Coordinates: 33°03′N 73°37′E

New Jhang is a village in Jhelum District, Punjab, Pakistan. It is located on Mangla Road, 4 km from Dina and 10 km from the Mangla Dam.

== History ==
The village was founded when the Mangla Dam was created in 1967, inundating many villages. Some of the displaced people settled in what is now known as New Jhang. It started with only a handful of families but has flourished into a large village.

New Jhang is now densely populated and has many shops. There is also a brick factory, a marble factory, a carpet factory, several mosques and an orphanage.

== People ==
Many of the early settlers migrated to Bradford, UK in the 1970s. They are now restaurateurs and businessmen.
