= Shadia (given name) =

Shadia is an Arabic feminine given name. Notable people with the name include:

== Given name ==
- Shadia (1931–2017), Egyptian actress and singer
- Shadia Drury (born 1950), Canadian academic and political commentator
- Shadia Habbal, Syrian-American astronomer and physicist
- Shadia Mansour (born 1985), British-Palestinian singer
- Shadia Marhaban, Indonesian international mediator and activist
- Shadia Simmons (born 1986), Canadian actress and teacher
