= Chak Jhumra Junction railway station =

Railway station in Punjab, Pakistan

Chak Jhumra Junction Station چک جُھمرا جنکشن ریلوے اسٹیشن
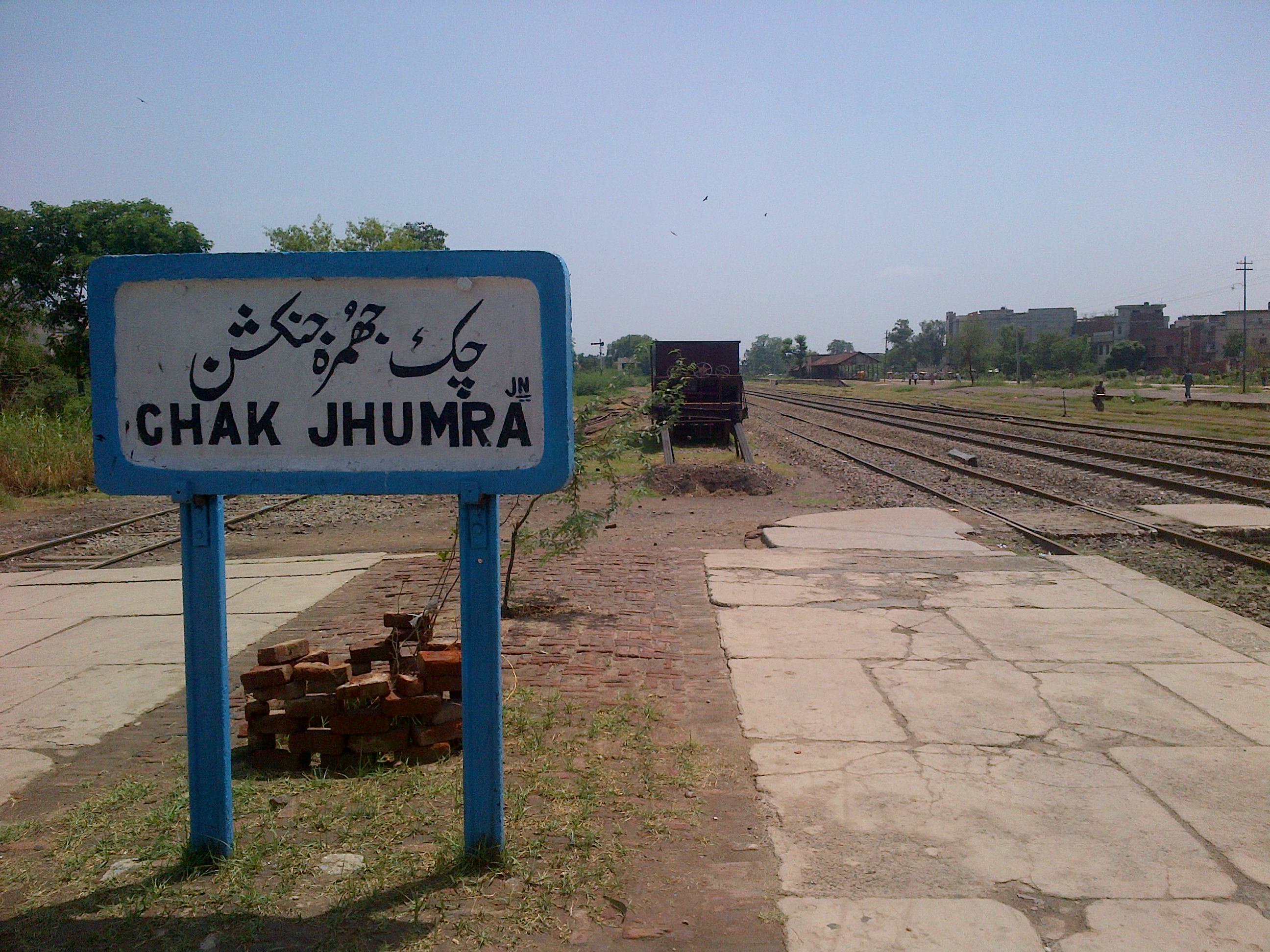

General information
- Coordinates: 31.5703°N 73.1872°E
- Owner: Ministry of Railways
- Lines: Khanewal–Wazirabad Branch Line; Sangla Hill–Kundian Branch Line

Construction
- Parking: Available
- Accessible: Available

Other information
- Station code: CKJ

History
- Opened: 1896

Services
Preceding station	Pakistan Railways	Following station
Faisalabad Dry Port towards Khanewal Junction	Khanewal–Wazirabad Branch Line	Sahianwala towards Wazirabad Junction
Sahianwala towards Sangla Hill Junction	Sangla Hill–Kundian Branch Line	Burj towards Kundian Junction
Location

Chak Jhumra Junction Railway Station (Urdu: چک جُھمرا جنکشن ریلوے اسٹیشن) is located in Chak Jhumra town, Faisalabad district of Punjab province, Pakistan.

In May 2025, Chak Jhumra was reported to be among 14 major stations of Pakistan Railways that were being converted to solar energy.

== See also ==
- List of railway stations in Pakistan
- Pakistan Railways
