= Kot Baloch =

- Village
- کوٹ بلوچ
- Interactive map of Kot Baloch
- Coordinates: 32.64781211210995°N 73.55334349985287°E
- Country: Pakistan
- Province: Punjab
- District: Mandi Bahauddin
- Tehsil: Mandi Bahauddin

Population (2017/18)
  - Total: 4،472
- Time zone: +5:00 Standard Timezone of Pakistan
- Post Office: 50361

Kot Baloch (Urdu: کوٹ بلوچ) is a village in Mandi Bahauddin District, Punjab, Pakistan, located eight kilometres north of Mandi Bahuddin. It was well known during British rule due to its organized bazaar and local markets. The village is named after the Balouch tribes who traditionally came here with their families and camels for summer grazing. They lived beside a bend in the River Jhelum which was a suitable, sheltered location. They spent six months in the area and then went back to their native areas for the winter season. Later Marth and other Gondal (clan) families came from the Sohawa and Jehlum area near Mandi Bahauddin and started cultivating the land, building temporary houses. After some years the Balouch families stopped coming to the village but the name of the village remains Kot Baloch. Now there are no Balouch people left in the village.

== Demographics ==
The population of Kot Balouch is over 5000 people including Lokri Martha'n, Lokri Lamocharan a small daira of Kot Balouch. The literacy rate is over 95%. Culturally Kot Baloch is a very rich village and people from different clans live in that village. Famous clans of the Village are Dudd(Langhah), Gondal, Marth, Maikan, Awan, Tarar, Gujar, Sial...etc.

[[ International Horse Rider (Neza'Baz) ( Choudhary Sikandar Hayat Gondal & Choudhary Ashraf Hayat Gondal)]] From Guniana Family

== Mela Baba Noor Shah ==
Baba Noor Shah was a famous Wali who preached to non-Muslims and spread Islam in the area. Every farmer donates one Times milk of Buffalo to Mazar (shrine) of Baba Noor Shah on the birth of a calf.

The main yearly event in this village is Mela Baba Noor Shah in last week of March and in this Mela horse racing and horse shows are main events. Also there is free kabaddi and local kushti. Horse racing is very popular in village, and a group of village riders, Sakandar Hiyat Gondal/Ashraf Gondal are famous as Top players of Tent pegging game, and mostly their groups won medals in every tournament even held in Pakistan or international level. This fair is one of the best forms of entertainment for farmers, where many kind of household items are available so they do not need to go to the market frequently. Farmers can buy what they need at the fair and enjoy entertainments such as the cinema, the death wall, Circus and others shows.

== Economy ==
Before 1970 agriculture was the only source of income for people from the village but now many young men are working in Europe and the Middle East and send remittances home to their families. Also, many educated people are serving the nation and the area by working in government top Jobs and private jobs after completing their higher education.
