= Ghurko =

Village in Punjab, Pakistan

Ghurko is a village of Kharian tehsil in Gujrat district, in the Punjab province of Pakistan. It has a population of roughly 3,000. After independence, Ghurko grew greatly in both population and education. It is roughly 140 km from the national capital Islamabad; more than 99% of the population belongs to the Gujjar tribe.

There is one public school in Ghurko, which has classes up to 8th grade. There are approximately 580 houses in the village, a commercial private bank, HBL, on the main road, and a private hospital.
