= Sabzazar railway station =

Railway station in Pakistan

Coordinates: 32°27′N 71°34′E

General information
- Owner: Ministry of Railways

Other information
- Station code: SBZR

History
- Former names: Great Indian Peninsula Railway
Location

Sabzazar railway station (Urdu: سبزہ زار ریلوے اسٹیشن) is located in Pakistan.

== See also ==
- List of railway stations in Pakistan
- Pakistan Railways
