= Hadali railway station =

Railway station in Pakistan

Hadali Railway Station ہڈالی ریلوے اسٹیشن

General information
- Owner: Ministry of Railways
- Line: Sangla Hill–Kundian Branch Line

Other information
- Station code: HDI

Hadali Railway Station (Urdu: ہڈالی ریلوے اسٹیشن) is located in Pakistan.

== See also ==
- List of railway stations in Pakistan
- Pakistan Railways
