= Miani, Punjab =

Pakistani town

Miani, Punjab میانی، پنجاب
- Town
- Location in Pakistan
- Coordinates: 32°11′18″N 73°01′43″E
- Country: Pakistan
- Province: Punjab
- Division: Sargodha
- District: Sargodha

Population (2017)
  - Total: 19,696

Miani is a town in Bhera Tehsil of Sargodha District in Punjab, Pakistan.

== History ==
Miani had a substantial population of Hindus and Sikhs, especially Khatri Kukhrans, before the partition of India. The Khatris moved to India after partition. Pre-partition, many Hindu Brahmin families also lived in Miani. Authentic, documented, hand-written records of these erstwhile Hindu residents of Miani can be found in the custody of Hindu priests at Haridwar , Gaya , and Pehowa towns of India. After formation of Pakistan, these Sikhs and Hindus migrated to India and Muslims who migrated from Indian Punjab mainly from Ramba village, district Karnal settled here.

== Overview ==
It is about 70 km from Sargodha city. It is situated on the bank of River Jhelum and 16 km from Bhera Motorway Interchange. It is just few kilometers away from Khewra Salt Mines, the Pakistan's largest, the world's 2nd largest and the oldest salt mine in the world.
