= Tariqabad railway station =

Railway station in Pakistan

General information
- Owner: Ministry of Railways

Other information
- Station code: TQD

History
- Former names: Pakistan Railways

Tariqabad railway station (Urdu: طارق آباد ریلوے اسٹیشن) is located in Tariqabad, Faisalabad District, Punjab, Pakistan.

== See also ==
- List of railway stations in Pakistan
- Pakistan Railways
