= Shadia railway station =

Railway station in Pakistan

Coordinates: 32.387929°N 71.774789°E

General information
- Owner: Ministry of Railways

Other information
- Station code: SDEA

History
- Former names: Great Indian Peninsula Railway
Location

Shadia railway station (Urdu: شادیا ریلوے اسٹیشن) is located in the town of Shadia, Mianwali District, Pakistan.

== See also ==
- List of railway stations in Pakistan
- Pakistan Railways
