= Kundian Junction railway station =

Railway station in Punjab, Pakistan

Kundian Junction Station کندیاں جنکشن ریلوے اسٹیشن

General information
- Location: Main Bazaar Road; Kundian, Punjab 42050; Pakistan
- Coordinates: 32.4532°N 71.4861°E
- Owner: Ministry of Railways
- Lines: Kotri–Attock Railway Line; Sangla Hill–Kundian Branch Line

Construction
- Parking: Available
- Accessible: Available

Other information
- Station code: KDA

History
- Opened: 1896

Services
Preceding station	Pakistan Railways	Following station
Khnqah Sirajia towards Kotri Junction	Kotri–Attock Line	Mianwali towards Attock City Junction
Wanbhacharan towards Sangla Hill Junction	Sangla Hill–Kundian Branch Line	Terminus
Location

Kundian Junction Railway Station (Urdu: کندیاں جنکشن ریلوے اسٹیشن) is located in Kundian Pakistan. Kundian is in midway of Rawalpindi-Multan section of PR. Mianwali Express train travels to Lahore from Mari Indus, Kundian, Sargodha, Sangla Hill etc. From Kundian Thal Express, Mehar Express, Khushhal Khan Khattak Express and Mianwali Express also pass towards various places to Multan, Karachi. There is a big Railway colony with Railway Hospital School too. There is a big Loco motive Shed in Kundian too.

== See also ==
- List of railway stations in Pakistan
- Pakistan Railways

Note: In 2011, trains (i.e, Mari Indus express, Sargodha rail car, Thal express) running from this junction were suspended due to railway crisis. In 2019, Mari Indus express (Mari Indus-Lahore) and Thal express (Rawalpindi-Multan) were restored. In addition to this, 2 new trains including Mianwali Express Naizi Express (Mari Indus Lahore) were included in to the railway system. Since then, this station has re-opened.
