= Shorkot Cantonment Junction railway station =

Railway station in Pakistan

Shorkot Cantonment Junction Railway Station شورکوٹ کینٹ جنکشن ریلوے اسٹیشن
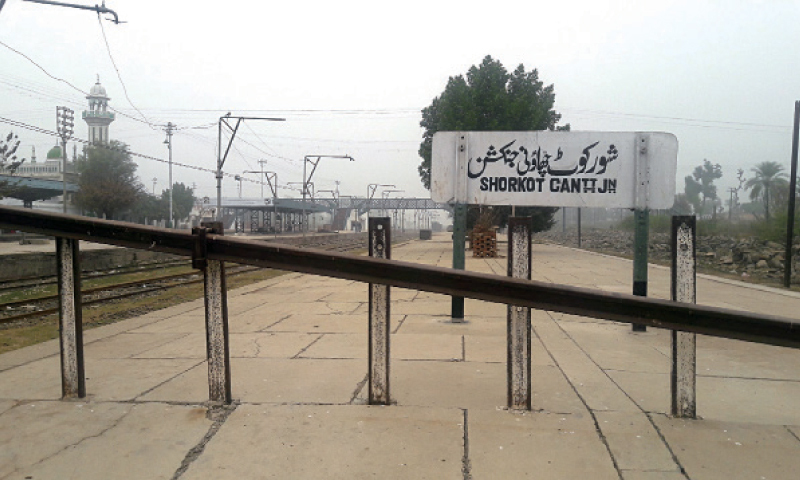

General information
- Coordinates: 30.788°N 72.250°E
- Owner: Ministry of Railways
- Lines: Khanewal–Wazirabad Branch Line; Shorkot–Lalamusa Branch Line; Shorkot–Sheikhupura Branch Line
- Platforms: 5
- Tracks: 9

Construction
- Parking: Available
- Accessible: Available

Other information
- Station code: SKO

History
- Opened: 1899

Services
Preceding station	Pakistan Railways	Following station
Jarala towards Khanewal Junction	Khanewal–Wazirabad Branch Line	Chutiana towards Wazirabad Junction
Terminus	Shorkot–Lalamusa Branch Line	Khanora towards Lala Musa Junction
Terminus	Shorkot–Sheikhupura Branch Line	Naim Ishfaq Shahid Halt towards Qila Sheikhupura Junction
Location

Shorkot Cantonment Junction Railway Station (Urdu and Punjabi: شورکوٹ کینٹ جنکشن ریلوے اسٹیشن) is located in the Shorkot Cantonment area of Shorkot, Pakistan, in the Punjab province. The station is divided between two districts. Platform 1 is in the Jhang District, while platforms 2–5 are in the Toba Tek Singh District.

== History ==
Shorkot Cantonment Railway Station is located on the Khanewal–Wazirabad Branch Line, originally known as the Wazirabad–Multan Railway under the North Western State Railway. A survey for a railway line began in 1892. Construction of the Wazirabad–Lyallpur section began in 1894, and the section opened in 1896. Construction of the Lyallpur–Multan section began the following year, and it opened in 1899. The survey was conducted by Paget Patrick Dease, an executive engineer from the Public Works Department (PWD). The Wazirabad–Lyallpur State Railway section was under construction in 1894, with Henry Herbert Gahan of the PWD serving as superintendent of works.

The railway station was built in 1899 to serve three branch lines. These were the Shorkot–Lalamusa Branch Line, the Shorkot–Sheikhupura Branch Line, and the Khanewal–Wazirabad Branch Line. It is considered one of the largest junctions of Pakistan Railways.

In earlier decades, Shorkot Cantonment Railway Station was one of the busiest stations of Pakistan Railways. It served as the terminal station for many services and was also used for freight operations and coach shunting. The station originally had a large freight yard beyond platform number 5, but as Pakistan Railways freight operations declined, the yard was reduced to platform 5, and the former freight yard was abandoned and buried.

Only one service originates from the station, the Ravi Express, which runs towards Lahore and is the only train on the Shorkot–Sheikhupura Branch Line.

Administratively, Shorkot Cantonment is considered part of Jhang District. However, only its main bazaar and some residential colonies fall in Jhang District, while the Shorkot Rafiqui Airbase and several residential colonies are part of Toba Tek Singh District.

The railway line at Shorkot Cantonment serves as a demarcation line between the two districts. Platform 1 is in Jhang District, while platforms 2–5 are part of Toba Tek Singh District.

=== Terminated services ===
==== Waris Shah Fast Passenger (207-Up / 208-Dn) ====
The Waris Shah Passenger was one of the oldest trains to run on the Shorkot–Sheikhupura Branch Line to Lahore Junction. The service was introduced in 1990 and was named after the poet Waris Shah. The Waris Shah was a passenger train with many stops, unlike the Ravi Express. The service ran until 2019 and was terminated by Pakistan Railways due to the COVID-19 pandemic. As of 2025, the service has not resumed. It was also one of the last remaining services to operate on this route.

==== Sultan Bahu Passenger (323-Up / 324-Dn) ====
The Sultan Bahu Passenger was a morning service that connected passengers from the Shorkot–Sheikhupura Branch Line to Lahore Junction. The train was named after the poet Sultan Bahu. The Sultan Bahu Passenger was terminated in 2008 due to a lack of locomotives.

==== Badar Express (111-Up / 112-Dn) ====
The Badar Express was started by Pakistan Railways in 1988. It was a premium service between Lahore and Shorkot. Unlike the Waris Shah Fast Passenger and the Ravi Express, the Badar Express used the Khanewal–Wazirabad Branch Line and the Shahdara Bagh–Sangla Hill Branch Line. The Badar Express served Faisalabad and carried passengers to Lahore. It also operated a second trip to Faisalabad under the service name "Ghouri Express". The train ran until 2014. The Badar Express still runs between Faisalabad and Lahore, but no longer uses Shorkot Cantonment as its point of origin.

==== Shorkot Passenger (239-Up / 240-Dn) ====
The Shorkot Passenger was the only train that ran between Shorkot and Sargodha. This service was terminated in 2008 due to a lack of locomotives and coaches, which were burned in the aftermath of the assassination of Benazir Bhutto.

== Platforms ==
Shorkot has five platforms for different services. Platforms 1 and 2 are mostly used for up and down trains, while platforms 3 and 4 are used for originating and terminating services. Platforms 3 and 4 have facilities for watering trains. Platform 5 is no longer in use because many services on this section of the line have been terminated.

== Loco shed ==
As a former freight hub and terminal for many services, Shorkot Cantonment has a loco shed and a turntable. At present, only two lines of the loco shed are in working condition, and only locomotives from the Ravi Express are stabled there before continuing their journey towards Lahore.

== See also ==
- List of railway stations in Pakistan
- Pakistan Railways
