= Lala Musa Junction railway station =

Railway station in Punjab, Pakistan

Lalamusa Junction Railway Station لالہ موسیٰ جنکشن ریلوے اسٹیشن
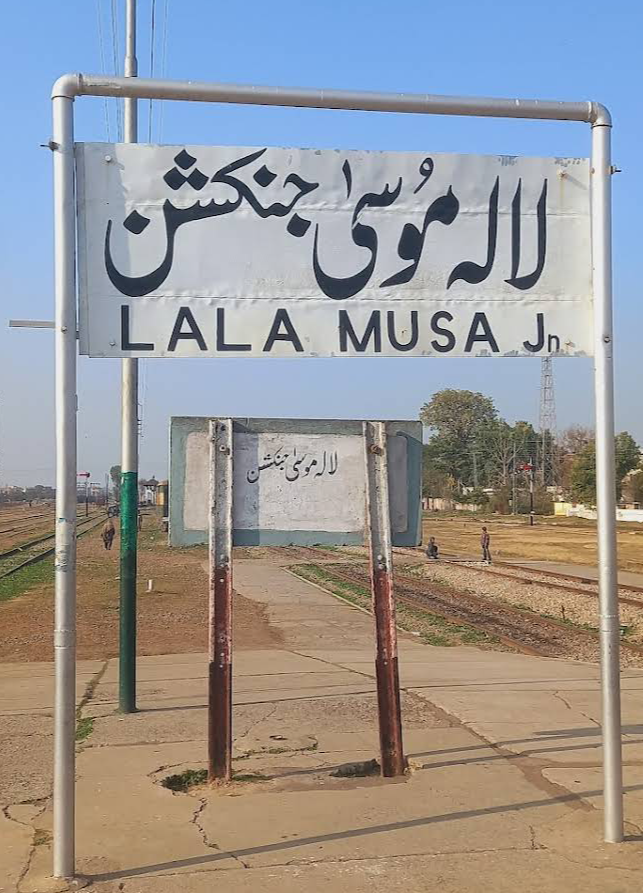

General information
- Coordinates: 32.7000°N 73.9492°E
- Owner: Ministry of Railways
- Lines: Karachi–Peshawar Railway Line; Shorkot–Lalamusa Branch Line
- Platforms: 4

Construction
- Parking: Available
- Cycle facilities: Available
- Accessible: Available

Other information
- Status: Functional
- Station code: LLM

History
- Opened: 1873

Services
Preceding station	Pakistan Railways	Following station
Deona Juliani towards Kiamari	Karachi–Peshawar Line	Lalamusa Goods towards Peshawar Cantonment
Akhtar Karnana towards Shorkot Cantonment Junction	Shorkot–Lalamusa Branch Line	Terminus
Location

Lala Musa Junction Railway Station (Urdu and Punjabi: لالہ موسیٰ جنکشن ریلوے اسٹیشن) is located in Lala Musa city, Gujrat district of Punjab province, Pakistan. The station serves as a junction for Malakwal Junction railway station and Sargodha Junction railway station. It was built in 1873 and became a junction in 1880.

== Gallery ==
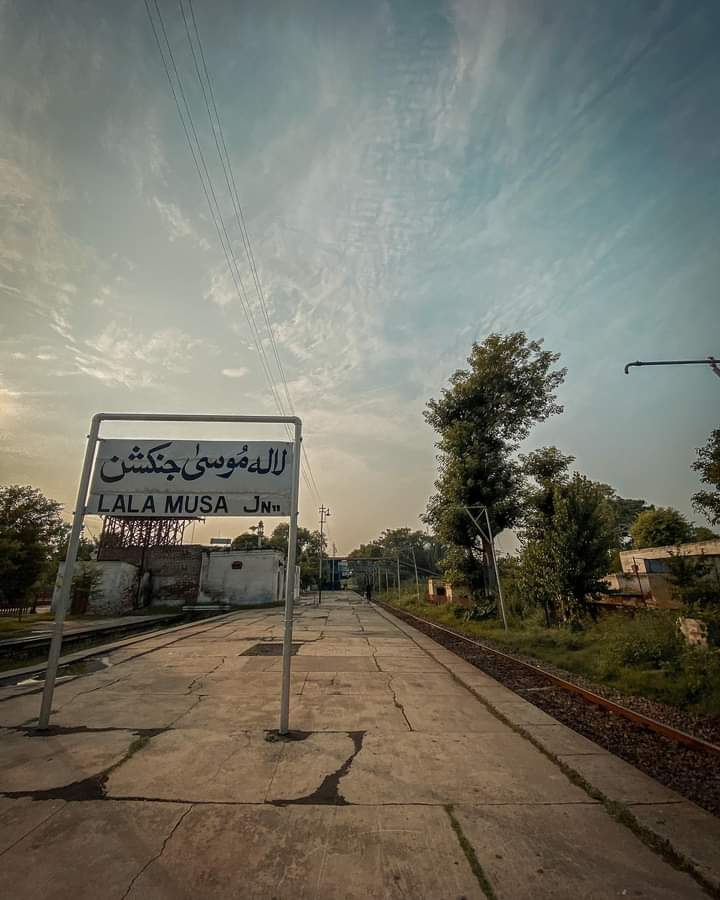

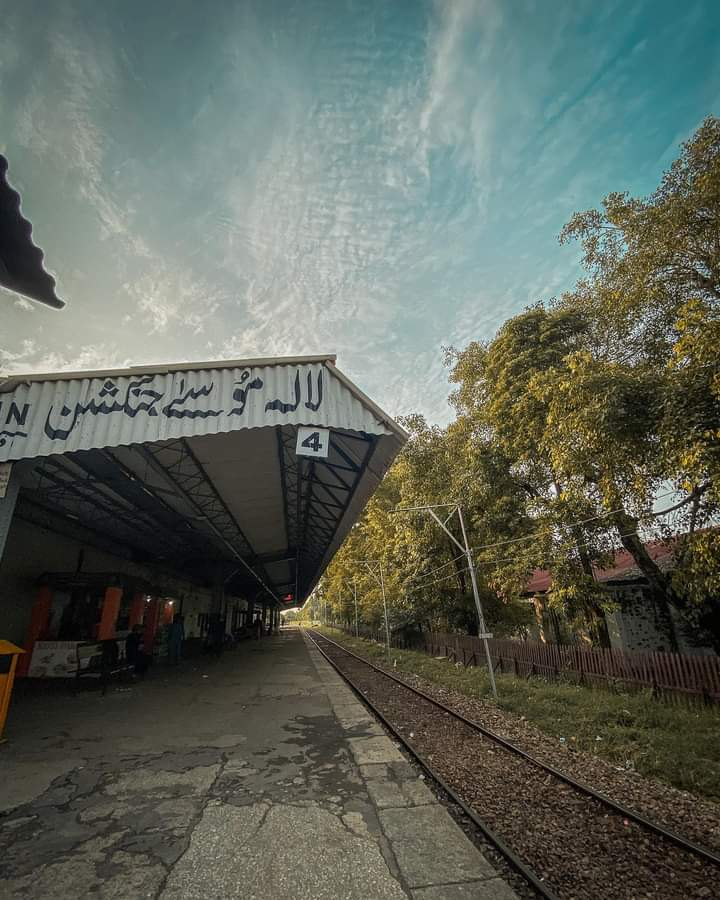

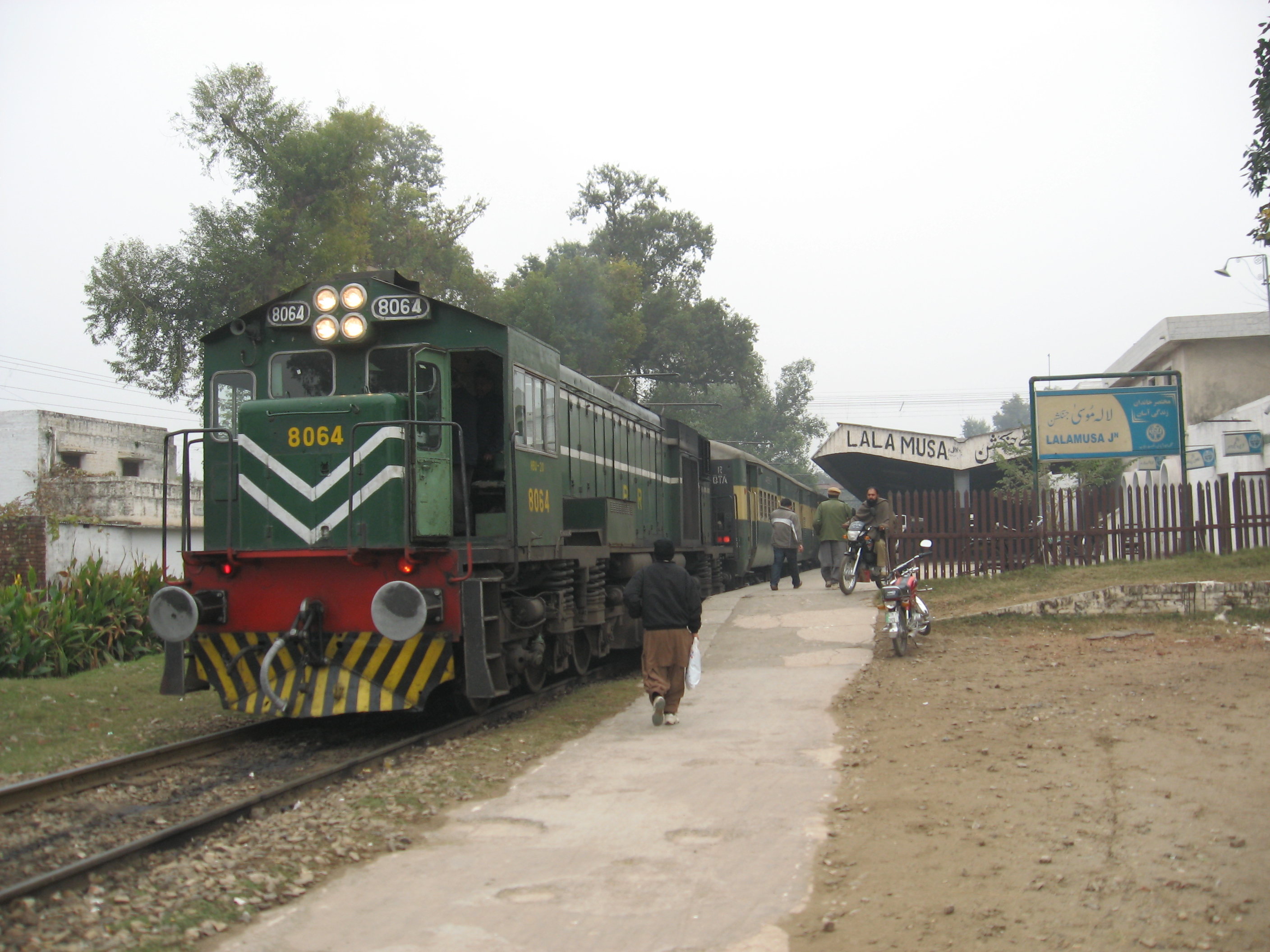

== See also ==
- List of railway stations in Pakistan
- Pakistan Railways
