= Daulatpur, Jhelum =

Daulatpur دولت پور
- Village
- Location in Pakistan
- Coordinates: 32°41′16″N 73°17′52″E
- Country: Pakistan
- Province: Punjab
- District: Jhelum
- Tehsil: Pind Dadan Khan
- Elevation: 232 m (761 ft)

Population
  - Demonym: Daulatpuri
- Time zone: UTC+5 (PKT)
- Postal code: 49610
- Dialling code: 0544
- Official languages: Urdu, English
- Regional language: Punjabi
- Dialect: Pothohari

Daulatpur (Urdu:دولت پور) is a village and union council of Jhelum District in the Punjab Province of Pakistan. It is part of Pind Dadan Khan Tehsil. It is four kilometers from the Pind Dadan Khan-Jhelum Road on the north side of Pinanwal, and east from Pindi Saidpur. The population of this village is approximately 4000.

== Health facilities ==
A government dispensary and a civil veterinary hospital are there.

== Villages of Filed Office ==
Chak Danial

Chak Jani

Nathial

Chakri

Mirza Abad

Gahora

Thill.

== Education facilities ==
It has a primary school for boys and an English-medium Girls' High school. The existence of this village is believed to be prior to "Alexander" era. Earlier it was situated along with the mountains, now approximately 2 kilometres away from the village. Remains of the settlement are found in the hilly terrain of the village. As the river (Jhelum) changed its route, village was believed to move as well. Pre-partition population of the village was equally divided between Muslims and Hindus. A few Sikh families were also settled here. The ancient part of village also contained a Hindu Temple.

== Other facilities ==
The major occupations of this village are agriculture and livestock farming. It has a good literacy rate. It has two Jamia Mosques, Gulzar-e-Madina and Gulzar-e-Habib, and five other Mosques.
