= Chakri, Jhelum =

Chakri چکری
- چکری
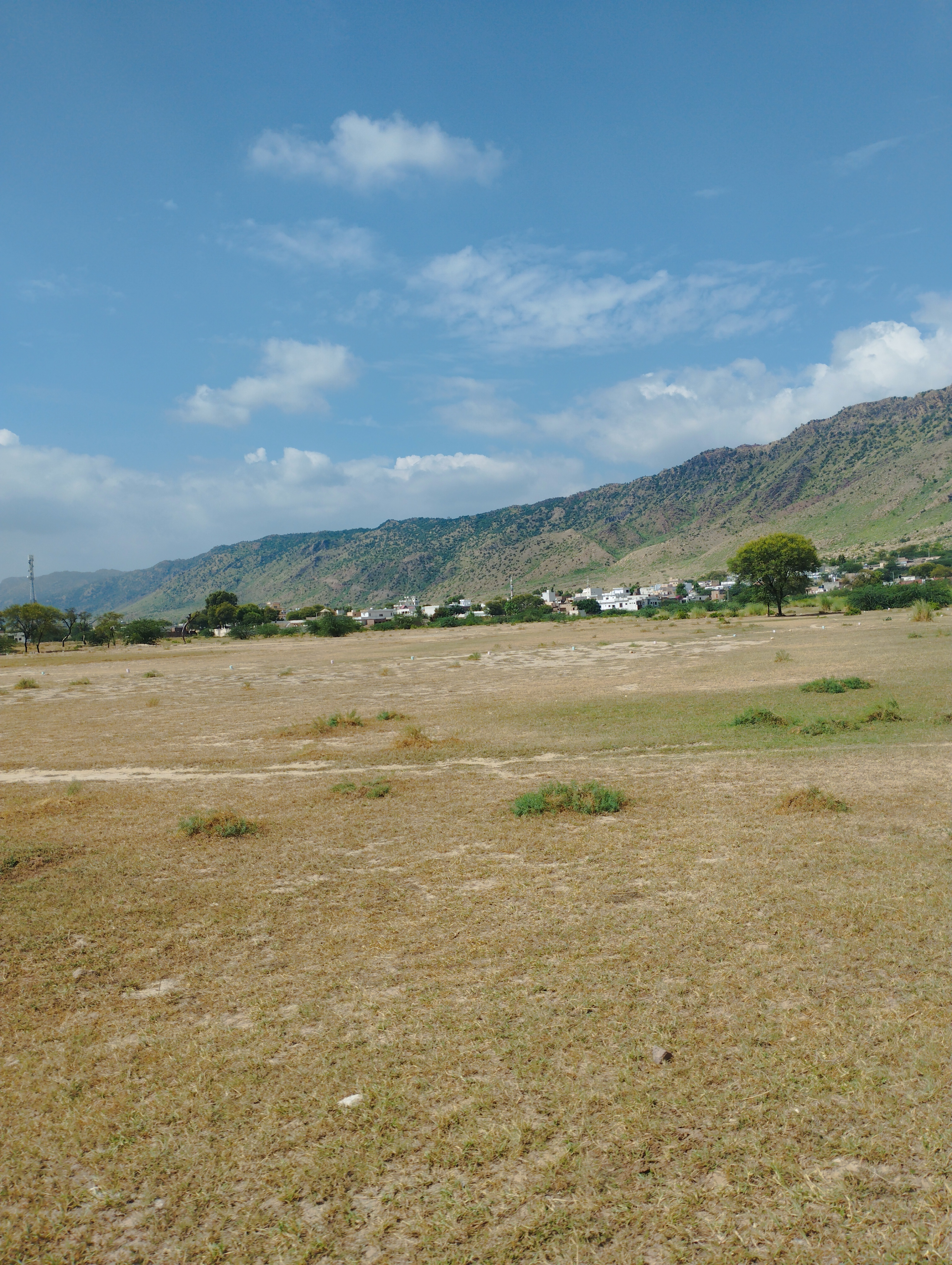
- Chakri, Haseeb Gulzar

- Location in Pakistan Chakri (Punjab, Pakistan)
- Coordinates: 32°41′3.44321200″N 73°20′59.100″E
- Country: Pakistan
- Province: Punjab
- District: Jhelum District
- Tehsil: Pind Dadan Khan
- Union Council: Daulatpur

Population (2015)
  - Total: 4,500
- Time zone: UTC+5 (PST)
  - Summer (DST): +6
- Postal code: 49111
- Area code: 0544

Chakri (Urdu:چکری) is a village in Union Council Daulatpur near Pindi Saidpur, in Jhelum District, Punjab, Pakistan. The village is part of the district's Pind Dadan Khan Tehsil.

== Education ==
The village has a Government Girls High School Chakri, Nathial for Girls.

== Health ==
The village has a Government Dispensary (Rural Dispensary) for the public.

== Neighboring villages ==
To the east of Chakri is Pir Chak, to the west is Mirza Abad, and to the south is Pindi Saidpur.
