= Sherpur, Jhelum =

Village in Punjab, Pakistan

Sherpur
- Village
- Location of Sherpur in Punjab, Pakistan Sherpur (Pakistan)
- Coordinates: 32°39′33″N 73°18′56″E
- Country: Pakistan
- Province: Punjab
- Division: Rawalpindi
- District: Jhelum District
- Tehsil: Pind Dadan Khan Tehsil
- Elevation: 210 m (690 ft)
- Time zone: UTC+5 (PKT)

Sherpur is a village in Pind Dadan Khan Tehsil of Jhelum District, in Punjab, Pakistan.

== Geography ==
Sherpur stands at an elevation of approximately 210 metres (690 ft) above sea level. It lies in the southern part of Jhelum District, within the area of the Salt Range and the lower Jhelum River valley, which characterise the southern portion of Pind Dadan Khan Tehsil. The village lies about 3.5 kilometres (2.2 mi) east of the town and union council of Pinanwal, with which it is associated in the surrounding road network. Neighbouring settlements include the village of Chak Jani and the union-council settlement of Pindi Saidpur.

== Administration ==
Pind Dadan Khan Tehsil, within which Sherpur lies, is one of the four tehsils of Jhelum District (the others being Dina, Jhelum and Sohawa) and is administratively divided into fifteen union councils.

== Transport ==
A local bus stop provides road links from Sherpur to surrounding towns and villages. The village lies in the hinterland of the Jhelum–Pind Dadan Khan road, which passes through nearby Pinanwal.

== See also ==
- Pind Dadan Khan
- Pind Dadan Khan Tehsil
- Jhelum District
- Pinanwal
