= Mirza Pur =

Village in Pakistan

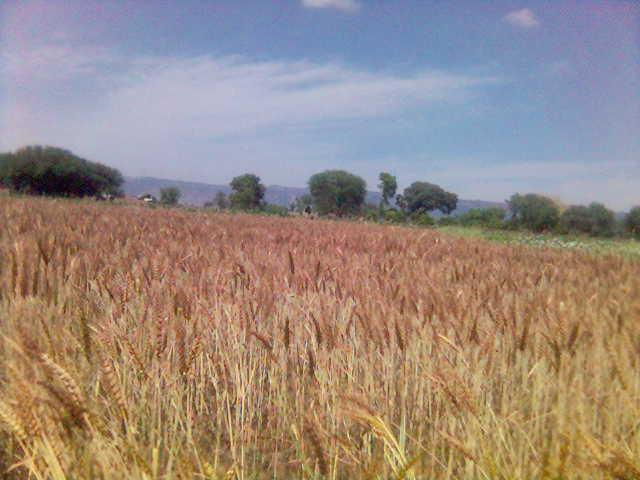
Wheat ready for harvest at Mirza Pur

Mirza Pur is a village in the Pind Dadan Khan Tehsil, Jhelum District, Punjab, Pakistan, about 28 kilometres (17 mi) from the town of Pind Dadan Khan. It has a population of about 4000.

Mirza Pur is primarily a farming village, with the land known for potatoes, wheat, maize, rice, sugarcane, vegetables and fruits such as mangoes and oranges. The main revenue generation crops are wheat, maize and potatoes. It is one of the largest villages of the Dharyala Jalap union council.

Adjoining villages are Jaiti Pur (situated on the bank of the river Jhelum), Karim Pur and Khotian. There is a government girls' middle school and government primary school for boys in Mirza Pur. There is also a primary school for girls in Karim Pur and Khotian.
