= Chak Ali Shah =

Village in Pakistan

Chak Ali Shah is a village approximately 20 kilometres (12 mi) east of tehsil Pind Dadan Khan, Jhelum District, in the province of Punjab, Pakistan.

It is bounded to the south by the River Jhelum and to the north by the Salt Range. The Khewra Salt Mine is 26 kilometres (16 mi) from the village. Neighbouring villages are Chak Hamid and Nawan Loke, and the nearest large town is Dharyala Jalap.

The majority of the population is Muslim Jalap Rajputs, but there are also well-known Jat and Syed families.
