= Thill =

Thill Sharif
- Village
- Thill Sharif, Arbab Raja

- Location within Pakistan
- Coordinates: 32.42°N 73.20°E
- Country: Pakistan
- Province: Punjab
- District: Jhelum
- Tehsil: Pind Dadan Khan
- Union Council: Daulatpur
- Elevation: 219 m (719 ft)

Population (1998)
  - Total: 3,000
- Time zone: UTC+5 (PST)
- Postal code: 49111
- Calling code: 0544

Thill, also known as Thill Sharif or Thil, is a village in Jhelum District, Punjab, Pakistan. It is located at 32°42'0 N' 73°20'0 E at an altitude of 279 metres (918 feet). It is situated between the Jhelum River and Pind Dadan Khan Tehsil, in the Salt Range where the Khewra Salt Mines are located.

== Geography ==
Thill Sharif is bordered by mountains to the north, Pindi Saidpur to the south, Awanpur to the east, and Daulatpur to the west. Thill Sharif is surrounded by Sufi shrines. The Khewra Salt Mines (کھیوڑہ) are nearby. The immediate area is flat and good for cultivation.

Bird's eye view of Thill Sharif

== Nearby towns ==
Pindi Saidpur ( پنڈی سید پور ) is the nearest town. Jalalpur Sharif is also nearby.

== Climate ==
Summers are long and hot and winters are cold. Due to the village's position in the mountains, there are strong winds. During the monsoon there is heavy rainfall. Rain water is used for cultivation.

== Education ==
There is no co-education in the schools. Locally there is sex-segregated primary education (grades one through eight). After that, students go to Pindi Saidpur for further education, which is also segregated by sex, so boys and girls attend separate schools to the high school level (grades up to ten), leading to the Secondary School Certificate. All schools run under the Rawalpindi Education Board. Islamic education is a requirement at all levels of education in Pakistan.

== Health ==
The Punjab Government established a small dispensary where a doctor and two nurses provide basic health care services.

== Crops ==
Crops grown in the area include wheat, potatoes, pearl millet, sesame, chickpeas, mustard, and other grains.
