= Saghar Pur =

Village in Punjab, Pakistan

Coordinates: 32°39′N 73°20′E

Saghar Pur سگھر پور
- Village
- Location in Pakistan
- Country: Pakistan
- Province: Punjab
- District: Jhelum
- Tehsil: Pind Dadan Khan

Population (2024)
  - Total: 6,000
- Time zone: UTC+5 (PST)

Saghar Pur (Urdu: سگھر پور) is a village located in Pind Dadan Khan Tehsil, in the southern part of Jhelum District, Punjab, Pakistan. The village is situated near the Salt Range and close to the River Jhelum.

== Geography ==
Saghar Pur lies in a region characterized by undulating hills and fertile plains. Its proximity to the Salt Range gives it unique geological features, while the waters of the nearby River Jhelum supports local agriculture.

== Demographics ==
The population of Saghar Pur is estimated to be around 6,000 as of 2024. The majority of the residents speak Punjabi, while Urdu is also understood and used in formal communication. According to local demographic records, the dominant clans in Sagharpur include Gondal, Marth, and Tarar.

== Important Personalities ==
Ex Chairman Ch Bati Khan Marth Deputy Commissioner Shahid Imran Marth SSP Ashraf Marth (Martyred) Commissioner Ayub Marth (Late)

== Economy ==
The economy of the village is primarily agrarian. Major crops include wheat, sugarcane, and various vegetables. A portion of the population is also employed abroad, particularly in the Middle East and Europe,contributing remittances to the local economy.

== Education ==
Saghar Pur has several basic educational institutions. The Government Elementary School Saghar Pur is one of the notable schools in the area. For higher education, students usually travel to nearby towns such as Pind Dadan Khan or Jhelum city.

== Infrastructure ==
The village has access to basic infrastructure such as electricity, water supply, and mobile network coverage. Roads connecting Saghar Pur to nearby villages and towns are partially paved, but transport can be limited during the rainy season.

== Notable Visits ==
In 2018, senior politician and media personality Fawad Chaudhry visited Saghar Pur as part of a political outreach event.. On 3 Nov 2023 Caretaker CM Mohsin Naqvi visited grave SSP Ashraf Marth at Sagharpur a suburb village of Syed Pur. https://gnnhd.tv/news/27577/cm-naqvi-pays-tribute-to-great-sacrifice-of-martyred-police-officer-ashraf-marth

== See also ==
- Pind Dadan Khan
- Salt Range
- River Jhelum
- Jhelum District
