= Mirza Abad =

Mirza Abad مرزا آباد
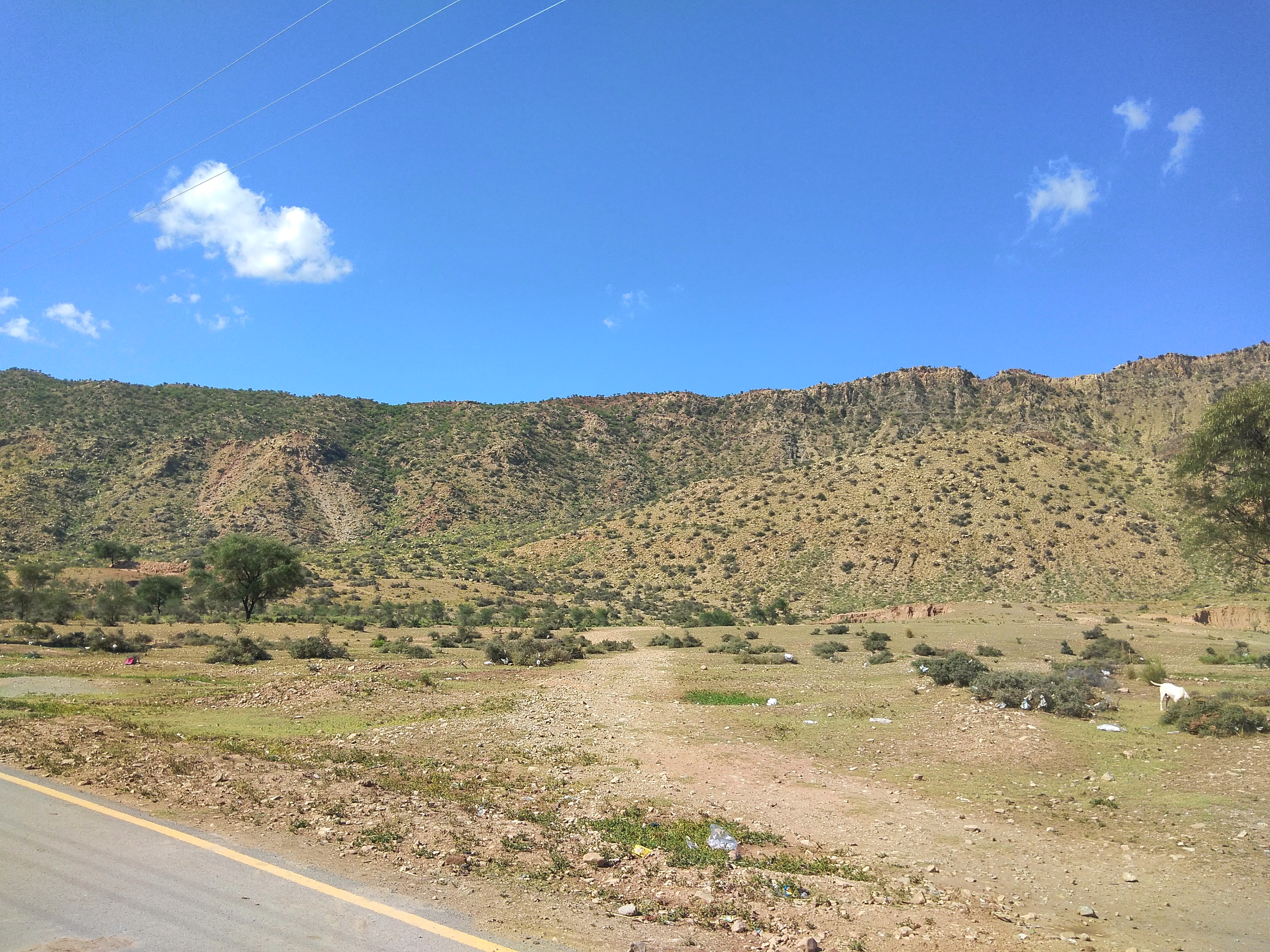
- Mirza Abad, Haseeb Mirza

- Location in Pakistan Mirza Abad (Punjab, Pakistan)
- Coordinates: 32°41′12.71200″N 73°20′48.99″E
- Country: Pakistan
- Province: (Punjab, Pakistan) Punjab
- District: Jhelum District
- Tehsil: Pind Dadan Khan
- Founder: Mirza Muhammad Yousaf

Population (2021)
  - Total: 611
- Time zone: UTC+5 (PST)
- Postal code: 49111
- Area code: 0544

Mirza Abad (Urdu: مرزا آباد), also known as Mirzaabad, is a village in Union Council Daulatpur, Pind Dadan Khan Tehsil, Jhelum District, Pakistan. It is located at 32°41'12.71N' 73°20'48.99E with an altitude of 190 metres (620 feet), near the Salt Range and Khewra Salt Mine.

== History ==
The first house in this village was built by Mirza Muhammad Yousaf in 1990, who came here from Chakri village, and by its Ghulam Rasool and Muhammad Sharif and now in the year 2025 the total number of houses in the village is 110.

== Gallery ==
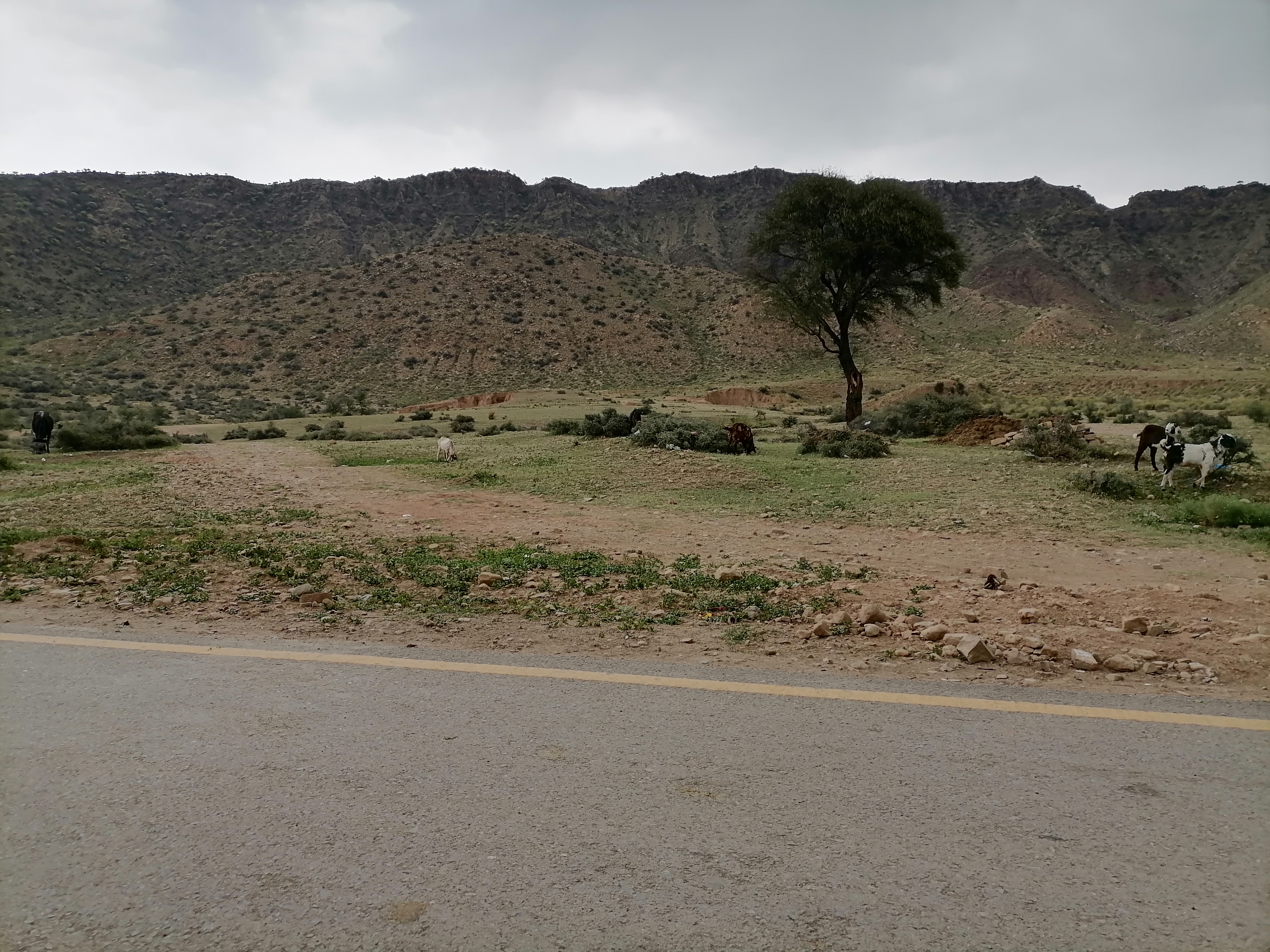
View of the village mountain

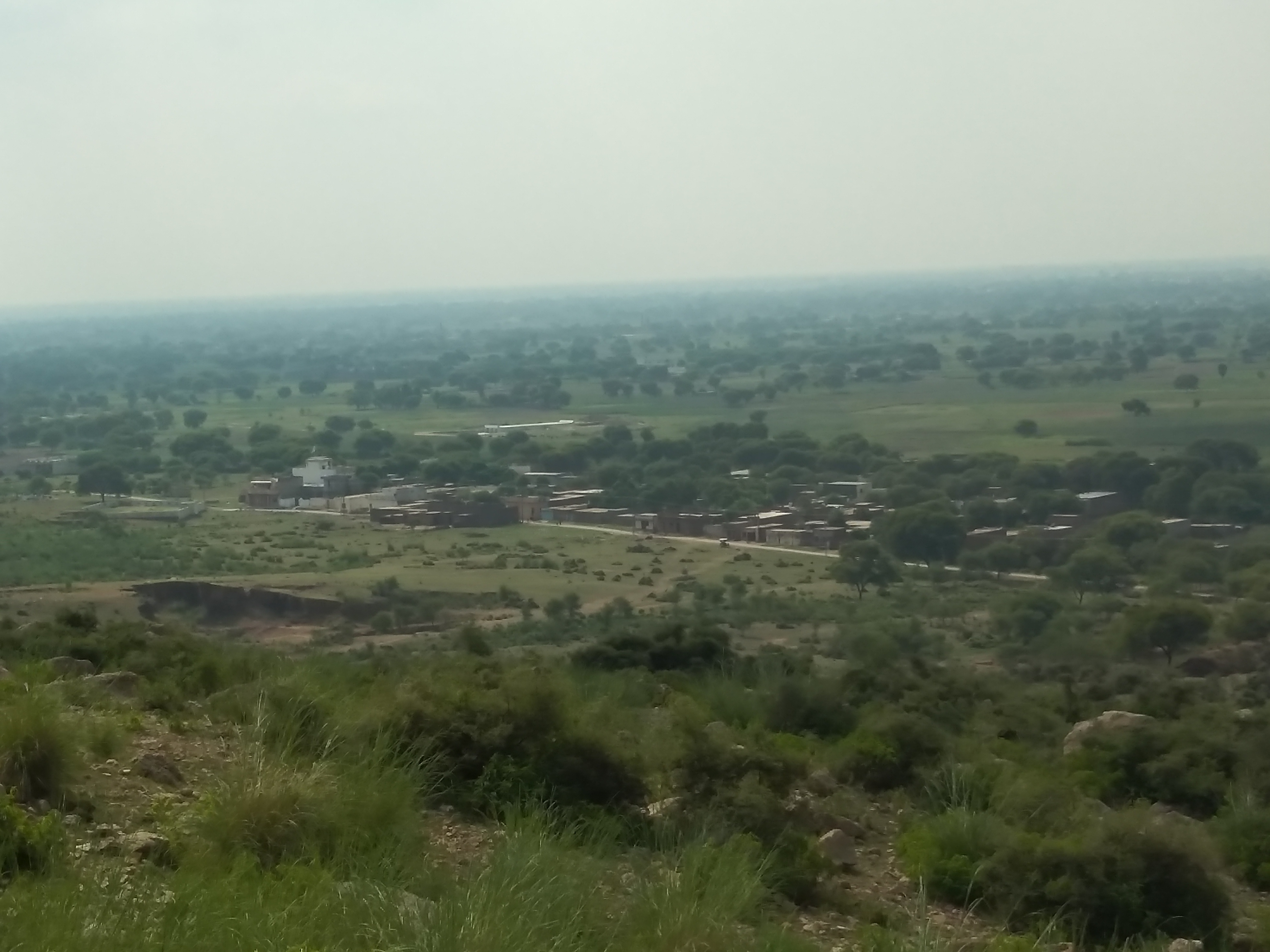
View of the village from the mountain.

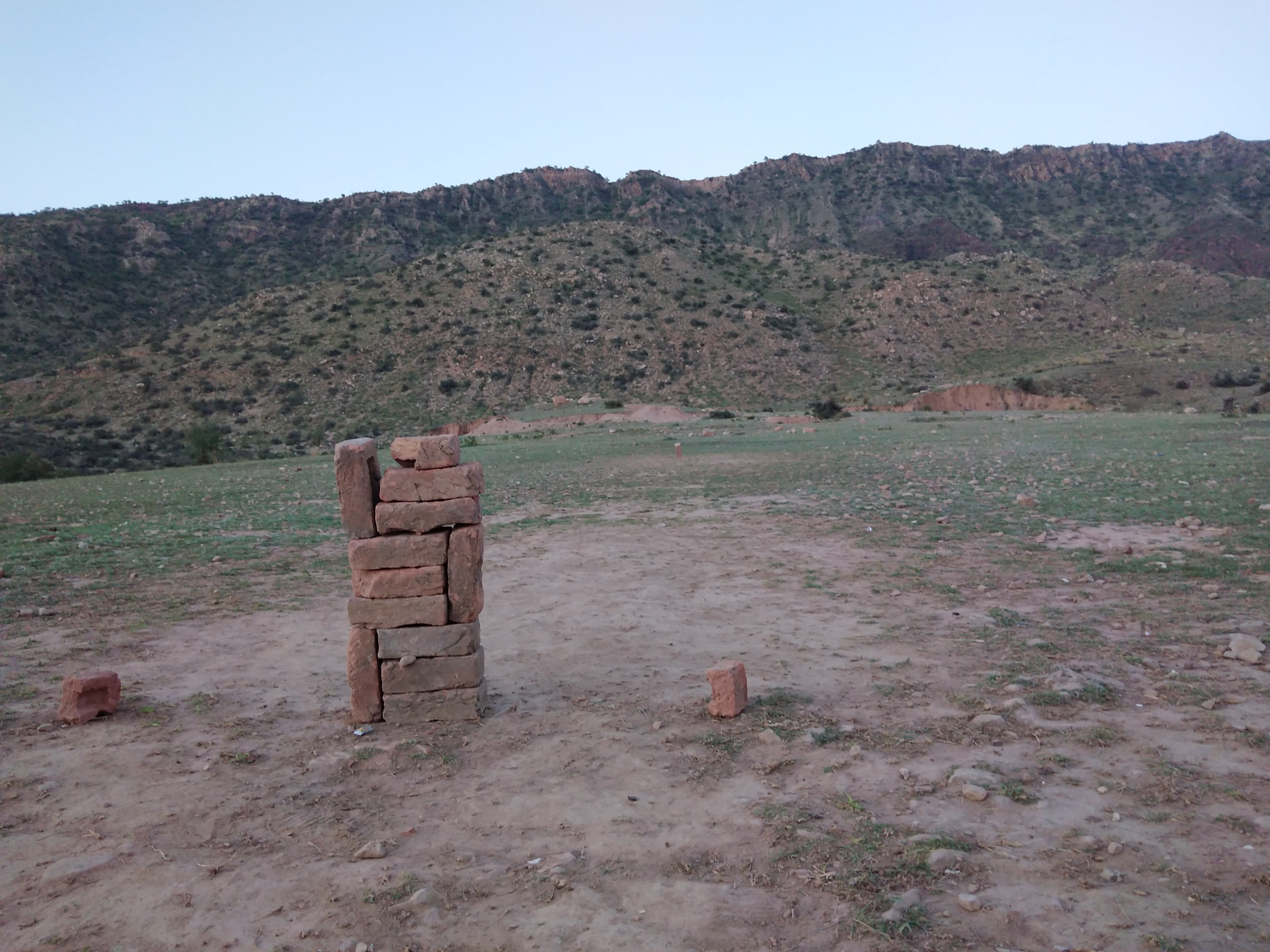
Cricket ground of Mirza Abad village.

== Mosques ==
There are two mosques, Gulzar-e-Madina and Masjid-e-Bilal.

== Education ==
The village has a governmental primary school.
