= Chak Shadi =

Coordinates: 32°39′40″N 73°15′20″E

Chak Shadi Jalap Pur
- Village and union council
- Interactive map of Chak Shadi
- Country: Pakistan
- Region: Punjab Province
- District: Jhelum District
- Tehsil: Pind Dadan Khan
- Time zone: UTC+5 (PST)

Chak Shadi is a village and union council of Jhelum District in the Punjab Province of Pakistan. Located near the town of Pinanwal, it is part of Pind Dadan Khan Tehsil, and located at 32°39'40N 73°15'20E with an altitude of 206 metres (679 feet). Almost the entire population is Muslim, and belongs to the Jalap tribe.
