= Dainkwan =

Dainkwan, Himachal Pradesh Denkwan, Khas
- Village
- Interactive map of Dainkwan, Himachal Pradesh
- Coordinates: 32.236°N 75.743°E
- Country: India
- State: Himachal Pradesh
- District: Kangra

Government
  - Type: govt. Of india

Languages
  - Official: Hindi
- Time zone: UTC+5:30 (IST)
- Pin Code: 176204
- Vehicle registration: HP 38

Dainkwan is a village panchayat located in the tehsil Nurpur, and district Kangra.

The surrounding nearby villages are Sanour, Thakurdwara, Tappa, Milwan, Kathgarh, Paral, Kursan, Gadhrana, Indora, Basantpur, Indpur, Makroli, Bhapoo, Raja khas, Madholi, Dah Kuhlara, Chhanni, Ghoran, Bhalakh, Dagla, Majra, Surajpur, Mangwal, Mohtli, Baleer, Sirat, Gangath, Rit Upperli Belimahanta, Gagwal, Lodhwan, Branda, Kandwal, Bakrarwan, Miani, Ghandran, Chaloh, Atara, Joki, Kandwal, Kangrari, Malhari, Gangath, Seikhpura, Surdwan, and Ulherian.
