= Tobah =

Tobah ٹوبہ
- Village and union council
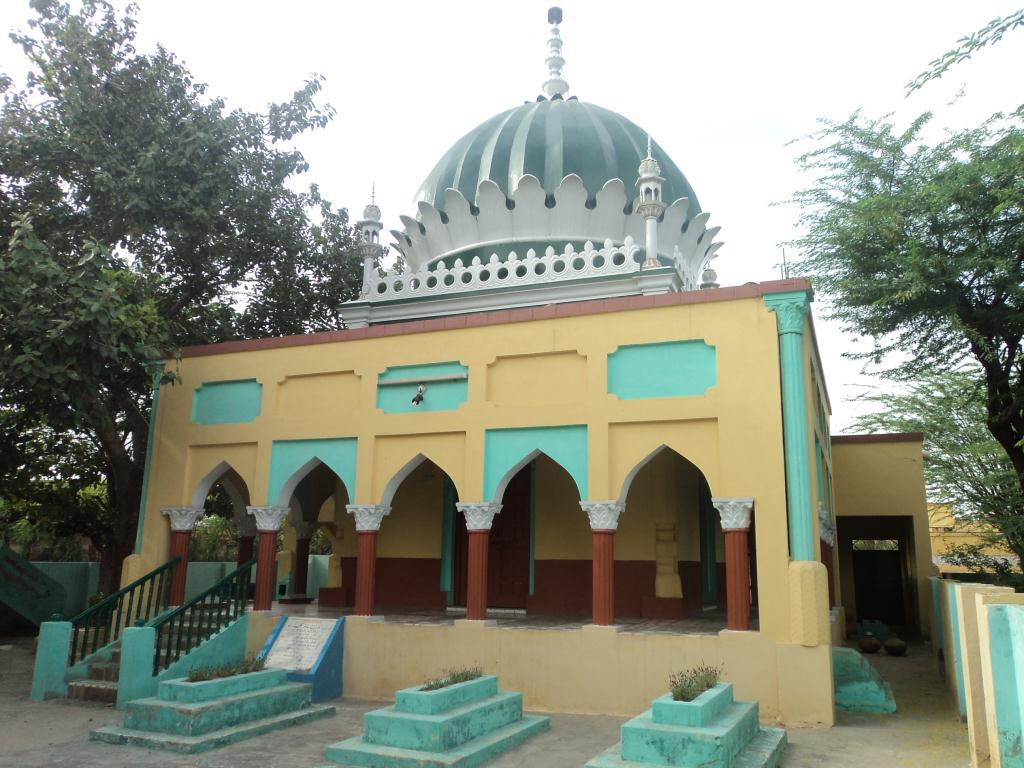
- Shrine of Bawa Gull Shah
- Country: Pakistan
- Province: Punjab
- District: Jhelum
- Tehsil: Pind Dadan Khan

Government
  - Type: municipal
- Time zone: UTC+5 (PST)
- Postal code: 49030

Tobah (Urdu: ٹوبہ) is a village and union council of Jhelum District in the Punjab Province of Pakistan. Its old name was Mackrach Road. It is part of Pind Dadan Khan Tehsil. The postal code is 49030.

Tobah had significant population of hindus till 1947. There was a hindu temple in western part of Tobah. Until the late 1990s, the town of Tobah had a small population with a couple of schools and a Basic Health Unit. The town became much more significant after the completion of the M2 motorway in 1997. With the construction of Lilla Interchange (Exit 16), the driving distance to major cities like Rawalpindi and Lahore was greatly reduced and this created opportunities for the development of the town.

The land is generally arid, but still teems with lush green fields. The climate is mostly warm, however the temperature drops dramatically in the winter. The major crop in the area is wheat, but a few vegetables are cultivated as well. Most of the population of Tobah is employed in agriculture, but there is also a commercial sector as well as those working for the armed forces or the revenue department of Pakistan.

== Location ==
Tobah is a village located in Tehsil Pind Dadan Khan, District Jhelum. It lies on Lillah - Pind Dadan Khan Road and is bounded by Saroba, Zobynar fire Dere, Athar and Karooli as the neighbouring villages. The famous river Jhelum flows in the South from East to West.

== Income ==
Agriculture is the main source of income.

== Education ==
- Government boys high school, Tohah.
- Government Girls high school, Tobah.
- Community Model school, Tobah.
- Brain Seed School System Tobah
- Allied School Tobah
- Educator School Tobah
- Dar-e-Arqam School Tobah

== Population ==
Approximately 15000 people reside in this town. It has status of a union council.

== Villages in union council ==
1. Athar
2. Bhelowal
3. Saroba
4. Tobah

== Major Castes ==
- Kurar
- SYED (SADAAT)
- Jutt Athroo
- Hitmal
- Bhulla
- Gondal
- Basra
- Mahar
- Janjua Rajput
- Khokhar
- Kadyal
- Bakhial
- Qureshi
- Awan
- Bhatti
- Toori
- Hitmal
- Maken
