= Jutana Jhelum =

Jutana Jhelum جوتانہ جہلم
- Village
- Location in Pakistan
- Coordinates: 32.724674°N 73.154836°E
- Country: Pakistan
- Province: Punjab
- District: Jhelum
- Tehsil: Pind Dadan Khan
- Time zone: UTC+5 (PST)
  - Summer (DST): +6

Jutana Jhelum (Urdu جوتانہ جہلم) is a village and union council of Jhelum District in the Punjab Province of Pakistan.

It is part of Pind Dadan Khan Tehsil.
