= Ahmedabad, Jhelum =

Coordinates: 32°40′0″N 73°20′0″E

Ahmedabad احمد آباد Pindi Saidpur
- Village and union council
- Interactive map of Ahmedabad
- Country: Pakistan
- Region: Punjab Province
- District: Jhelum District
- Time zone: UTC+5 (PST)
- Postal code: 49110
- Website: http://junaid.stylelists.net/

Ahmedabad (Urdu: احمد آباد) is a village and union council of Jhelum District in the Punjab Province of Pakistan. It is part of Pind Dadan Khan Tehsil, and is located at 32°40'0N 73°20'0E at an altitude of 215 metres (708 feet). Ahmedabad is on the bank of the Jhelum River, about 7 km from the M2 motorway's Lilla Inter change, about 30 km from Pind Dadan Khan Tehsil and 36 km from Khewra Salt Mines. Ahmedabad is a Khokhar settlement in Jhelum District.

Athar was once part of union council Ahmedabad and is now part of union council Tobah. Villages of Union Council Ahmedabad, Mandhar, Langr, Malyar, Bhana, Kotlan Syedan, Syed Rehman, Jndran, Meery.
