= Aadowal Jhelum =

- Village
- Location in Pakistan
- Coordinates: 32.616670°N 73.183076°E
- Country: Pakistan
- Province: Punjab
- District: Jhelum
- Tehsil: Pind Dadan Khan
- Time zone: UTC+5 (PST)
  - Summer (DST): +6

Aadowal Jhelum is a village and union council of Jhelum District in the Punjab province of Pakistan. It is part of Pind Dadan Khan Tehsil.
