= Athar Jhelum =

- Village
- Country: Pakistan
- Province: Punjab
- District: Jhelum
- Time zone: UTC+5 (PST)
  - Summer (DST): +6

Athar Jhelum Is a village and union council of Jhelum District (Urdu جہلم) in the Punjab Province of Pakistan. It is part of Pind Dadan Khan Tehsil.
