= Noor Pur Baghan =

Noor Pur Baghan نور پور باغاں
- Village
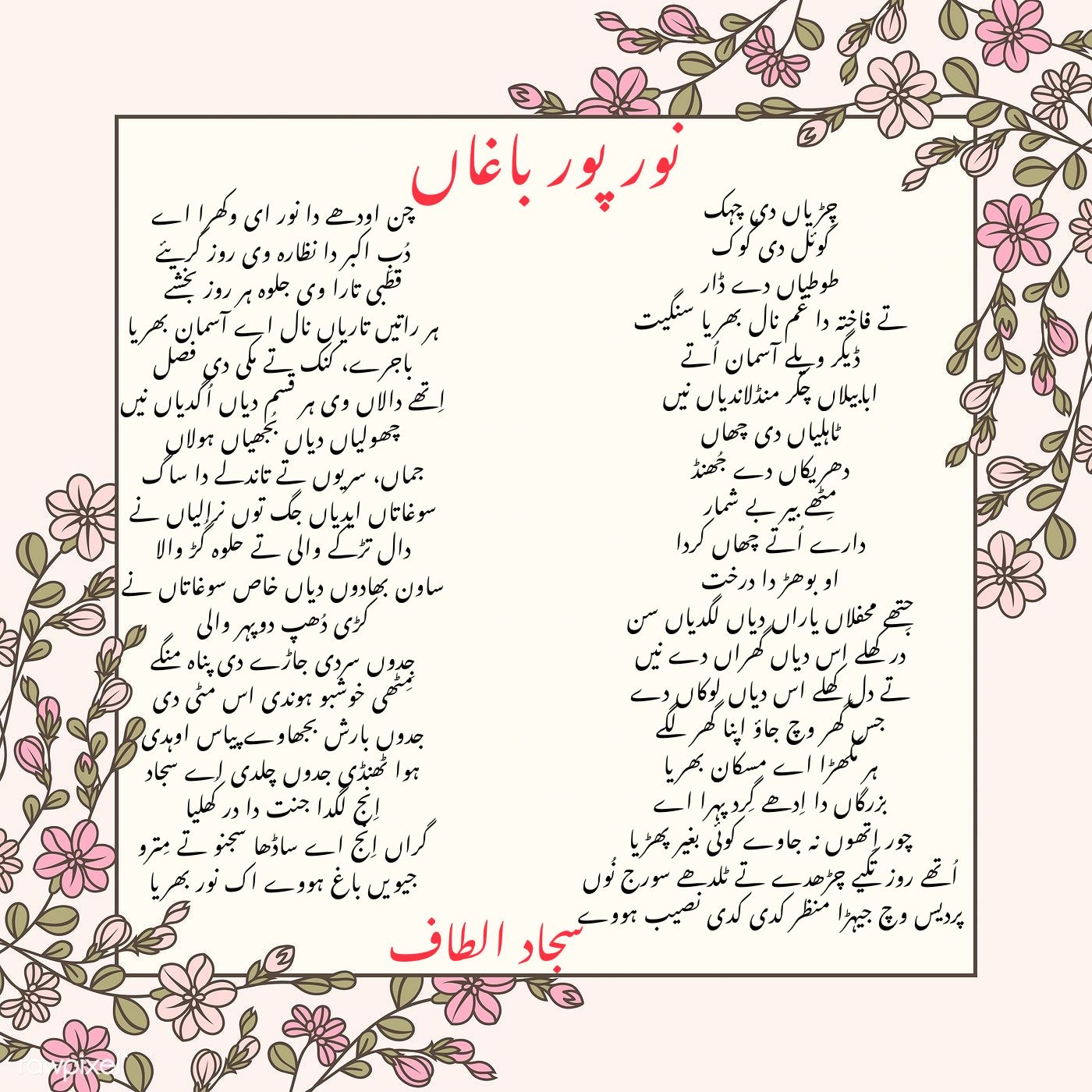
- A Punjabi language poem about life in Noor Pur Baghan written by native poet Sajjad Altaf

- Location within Punjab, Pakistan Noor Pur Baghan (Pakistan)
- Coordinates: 32°51′18.849″N 73°34′41.9046″E
- Country: Pakistan
- Province: Punjab
- District: Jhelum
- Tehsil: Dina
- Union Council: Janjeel
- Post Office: Sanghoi

Government
  - Type: Union Council
- Elevation: 269 m (883 ft)

Population (2017)
  - Total: 920
  - Estimate (2023): 959
- Time zone: UTC+5 (PKT)
- Area code: 0544

Noor Pur Baghan (Urdu: نور پور باغاں ALA-LC: Nūr Pūr Bāg̱ẖāṉ IPA: [nuːr puːr bɑːɣɑ̃ː]), also written as Nur Pur Baghan or abbreviated as NPB, is a village located in the Jhelum District of Punjab, Pakistan. It is part of Dina Tehsil and comes under the Janjeel Union Council. It is located 16.83 kilometers southwest of Jhelum city and 58.09 kilometers northeast of Pind Dadan Khan.

== Etymology ==
Noor is an Arabic term signifying divine light, and Pur in Urdu translates to filled with. The term Baghan originates from Bagh, meaning garden or gardens. Consequently, the complete name Noor Pur Baghan conveys the meaning of a garden filled with divine light or, in its plural form, gardens filled with divine light.

== Administration ==
Historically, it has been always part of Sanghoi union council of Jhelum tehsil but in 2005 Dina tehsil was formed and Janjeel union council was created under it. The village was inducted into these entities at that time.

== Geography ==
Situated in the plains between the Jhelum River and the Salt Range, it stands as one of the southernmost villages in Dina Tehsil, bordering Jhelum Tehsil.

== Demographics ==
Historical population
Census	Pop.	Time span (yrs)	%±	Annual RoG %±
1951	410	—	—	—
1961	414	10	.98%	.1%
1972	542	11	30.92%	2.48%
1981	521	9	-3.87%	-.44%
1998	807	17	54.9%	2.61%
2017	920	19	14%	.69%
2023 (est)	959	6	4.24%	.69%

== Education ==
This village has two primary schools, one for boys and one for girls.
