= Gujjar, Jhelum =

- Village and union council
- Country: Pakistan
- Region: Punjab Province
- District: Jhelum District
- Time zone: UTC+5 (PST)

Gujjar is a village and union council of Jhelum District in the Punjab Province of Pakistan. It is part of Pind Dadan Khan Tehsil. It gets its name from the Gujjar tribe, who make up the majority of its population.
