= Saroba Jhelum =

Saroba سروبہ
- Village
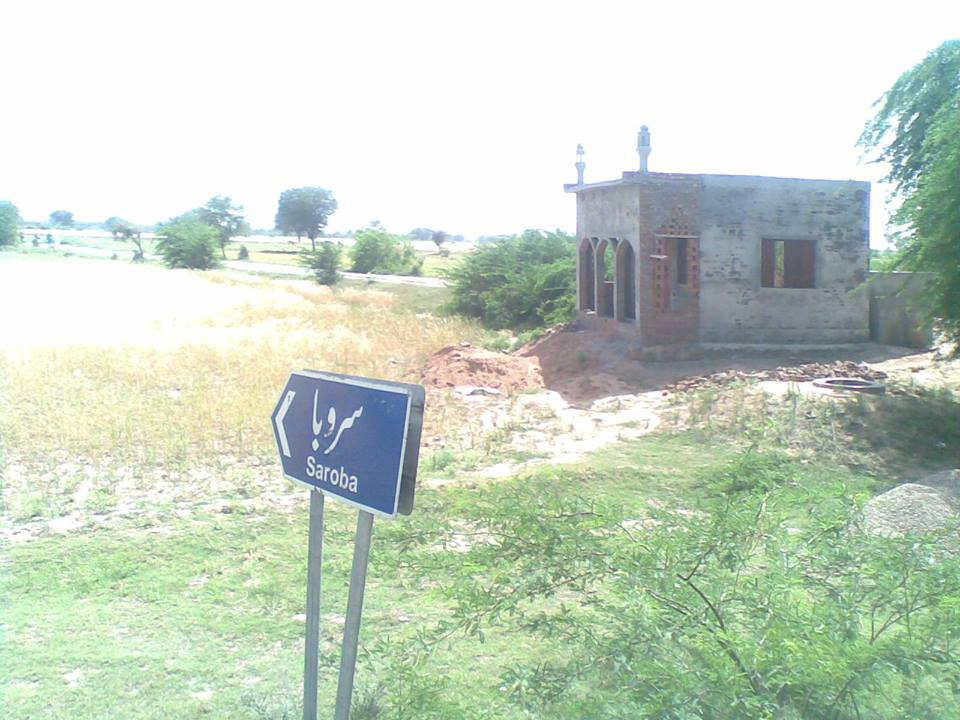
- Bus stop in Saroba, Punjab, Pakistan

- Location of Saroba Punjab, in West Pakistan
- Coordinates: 32°34′00″N 72°52′11″E
- Country: Pakistan
- Province: Punjab
- District: Jhelum District
- Village: 1
- Time zone: UTC+5 (PST)
  - Summer (DST): +6

Saroba (Urdu: سروبہ) is a village and union council of Jhelum District (Urdu: جہلم) in the Punjab Province of Pakistan. It is part of Pind Dadan Khan Tehsil.

== Location ==
Saroba is located approximately (184 km) kilometres south of the capital city, Islamabad.

== Saroba Railway Station Main ==
Saroba railway station.

== Income ==
Agriculture is the usual source of income.

== Education ==
Government high school Saroba Government Girls high school Saroba Global Revolutionary Public School Saroba Al-Harmain School Saroba

== Population ==
Approximately 7000 people reside in this town.

== Languages ==
The language spoken in Saroba Punjab is Punjabi with a blend of many dialects such as Wanhari, Pothohari and Lunhari.
