= Naich =

Naich can refer to:

- Naich, Jhelum, a village in Punjab, Pakistan

== See also ==
- Naiche (c. 1857–1919), an Apache Indian chief
