= Chak Jani, Jhelum =

Locality of Jhelum district, Punjab, Pakistan

Chak Jani (Urdu: چکجانی) is a village 60 km (37 mi) north of Jhelum district, in the province of Punjab, Pakistan. The Tehsil of this village is Pind Dadan Khan.

== Basic Facilities ==
The village has an Elementary School for the basic education of boys and girls.
