= Shamaspur =

Shamaspur شمس پور
- village
- Shamas Pur
- Location in Pakistan
- Coordinates: 33°00′24″N 73°41′44″E
- Country: Pakistan
- Province: Punjab
- District: Jhelum District
- Tehsil: Jhelum Tehsil

Population
  - Urban: 5,000
- Time zone: UTC+5 (PST)
  - Summer (DST): +6

Shamaspur is a village of Jhelum District in the Punjab Province of Pakistan. It is part of Jhelum Tehsil and Union Council Chak Jamal.

== History ==
It was founded by two infamous men who migrated there from Multan, whose graves are well known amongst the villagers. The nearby territories at the time were inhabited by the: Brahman Rajputs, who were of rich landlord families; the Syeds who descended from one of the seven generations of Syed Ali al-Harisi bin Mohammed al-Dibaj bin Ja'far al-Sadiq bin Hussein bin Ali ibn Abi Talib, this generation also fought alongside the well remarked Mahmud of Ghazni, leaving the six out of seven generations in Iran as another Shia Branch. This branch is Sunni and spread out across northern Pakistan. And the Sheikhs who descended from a sahaba, whose descendants migrated from somewhere in Iraq (Most possibly Baghdad) to Multan, Punjab to escape from the cruel Umayyad and Abbasid Caliphs. The village (along with others of the Jhelum district) is known for taking pride in sending their family members into the Pak army.
