= Thallah Chaudrian =

Coordinates: 32°54′57″N 73°22′37″E

Thallah Chaudrian is a village in Jhelum District, Punjab, Pakistan.

Thallah Chaudrian is near Baragowah and Padhri. It has 120 houses and its condition is better than other areas.

Members of many families in the village work in other countries, especially the UAE and European countries. The people of the village are comparatively educated and the literacy rate of the village is better than the other villages of the area.
