= Nougran Shareef =

Nougran Shareef is a village in Jhelum District, Punjab, Pakistan. The village is 6.9 miles west of the main Jhelum city, by Combine Military Hospital. It consists of 610 houses and has a population of 6,810 approx.

The main tribes residing here are Mirza, Raja (Ghakar), Chaudhry, Qureshi and non farmers' families.

== Demographics ==
The population of Nougran, according to 2017 census was 4,442.
