= Naich, Jhelum =

Village in Jhelum District, Pakistan

Coordinates: 27°31′50″N 68°9′0″E

Naich Village
- village
- Naich Gujjar
- Interactive map of Naich Village
- Country: Pakistan
- Province: Punjab
- District: Jhelum

Population
  - Total: 650
- Time zone: UTC+5 (PST)
- Postal code: 49040

Naich (Urdu: نا ئچ) is a village in Tehsil Pind Dadan Khan, District Jhelum, Punjab, Pakistan.
