= Baghanwala =

Coordinates: 32°42′57.7″N 73°13′50.4″E

- Village
- Baghanwala
- Interactive map of Baghanwala
- Country: Pakistan
- Province: Punjab
- District: Jhelum

Baghanwala (Urdu: باغاں والہ) is a village in the Jhelum District, in Punjab, Pakistan.

== History ==
This village predates the establishment of Pakistan. The hill where 11th-century scholar Al-Biruni measured the diameter of the earth, is nearby, as is an old fort.

== Facilities ==
This village has a government primary school for basic education; there is also a government dispensary for basic health services.
