= Bhelowal =

Bhelowal بھیلووال
- Village
- Location of Bhelowal Punjab, in West Pakistan
- Coordinates: 32°38′19″N 72°58′37″E
- Country: Pakistan
- Province: Punjab
- District: Jhelum
- Tehsil: Pind Dadan Khan
- Time zone: UTC+5 (PST)
  - Summer (DST): +6

Bhelowal (Urdu, Punjabi: بھیلووال) is a village and union council of Jhelum District (Urdu جہلم) in the Punjab Province of Pakistan. It is part of Pind Dadan Khan Tehsil. Bhelowal is located approximately 189 km south of the capital Islamabad. The language spoken in Saroba Punjab is Punjabi with blend of many dialects such as wanhari and pothohari. Approximately 2,700 people reside in this town. Agriculture is the usual source of income.
