= Sauwal =

Sauwal ساوال
- Village and Union Council
- Location in Pakistan
- Coordinates: 32°40′10″N 73°9′31″E
- Country: Pakistan
- Province: Punjab
- District: Jhelum District
- Village: 1

Government
  - Type: Local Gov.
  - Chairman UC: Chaudhry Shafqat Bilal Gondal (PTI)

Population
  - Total: 24,500
- Time zone: UTC+5 (PST)

Sauwal is a village and union council of Jhelum District in the Punjab Province of Pakistan. It is part of Pind Dadan Khan Tehsil. The population is around 24,500.
