= Dhok Mughal Pathaan =

Dhok Mughal Pathaan ڈھوک مغل پٹھان
- Village
- Location in Pakistan
- Coordinates: 32°35′38″N 72°56′36″E
- Country: Pakistan
- Province: Punjab
- District: Jhelum
- Time zone: UTC+5 (PST)
  - Summer (DST): +6

Dhok Mughal Pathaan is a village in the Jhelum District of Punjab, Pakistan.

The history of this village dates back to around 300 years ago, when two brothers from Afghanistan migrated to Punjab. The name of the village reflects the background of the 2 brothers, who were of Mughal Pathaan origin. According to village elders, the village is in its 7th generation.

== Occupation of locals ==
Many individuals from this village are either abroad (UK, U.A.E., Saudi Arabia, Australia, America, New Zealand), serving in the Pakistan Army or involved in farming.

http://wikimapia.org/#lat=33.0769423&lon=73.2317281&z=19&l=0&m=b
