= Chak Hamid =

Village in Jhelum District, Punjab, Pakistan

Coordinates: 32°38′N 73°12′E

Chak Hamid (Urdu: چک حمید) is a village in the Pind Dadan Khan Tehsil of Jhelum District, of Punjab, Pakistan.

Most of the population is Muslim, and most of them belong to Jalap Rajput.
