= Gharmala =

- Village
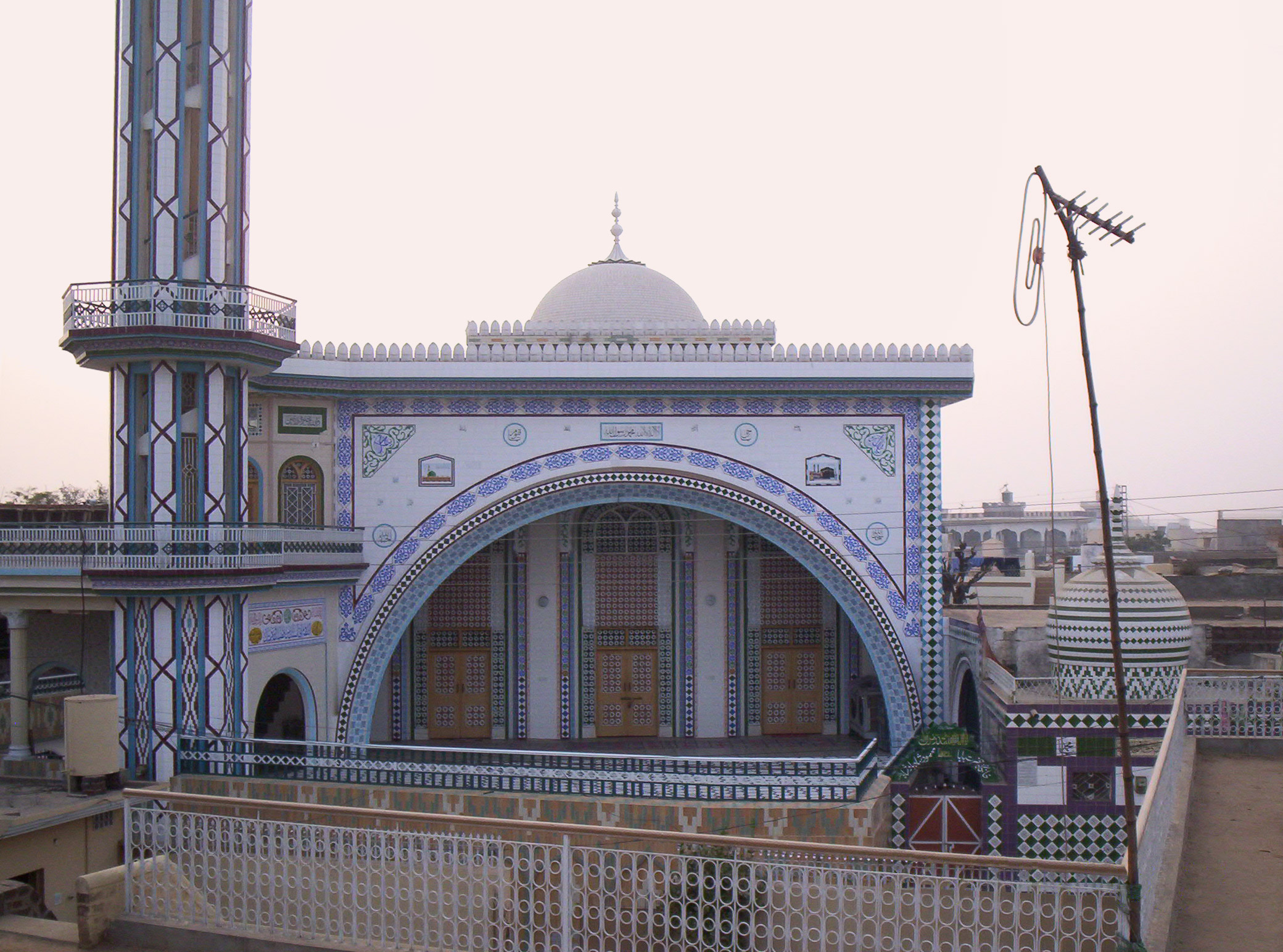
- Jamia Mosque Gharmala

- Location in Pakistan
- Coordinates: 32°57′N 73°41′E
- Country: Pakistan
- Province: Punjab
- District: Jhelum
- Time zone: UTC+5 (PKT)
- Area code: 0544

Gharmala (Urdu:گھرمالہ ) is a village in the Jhelum District, Punjab, Pakistan. It is part of Jhelum Tehsil.

== Geography ==
The village lies at the foot of the Pothohar Plateau. The area experiences all four seasons. In summer the temperature can exceed 48 °C (118 °F). The monsoon starts in the middle of July and lasts for 4 to 6 weeks. Winters are mostly dry and cold. December is relatively wet and temperature can fall below 0 °C.
