= Haranpur =

Coordinates: 32°36′11″N 73°8′53″E

- Town and union council
- Interactive map of Haranpur
- Country: Pakistan
- Region: Jhelum
- District: Jhelum District

Population
  - Town and union council: 9,864
  - Urban: 6,615
- Time zone: UTC+5 (PST)

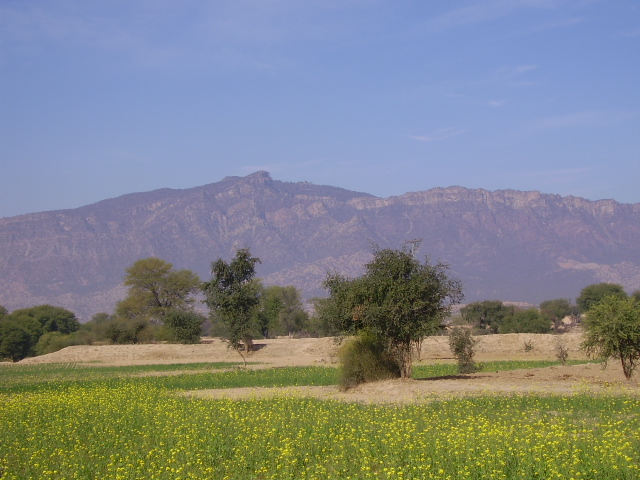
Tilla Jogian

Haranpur is a town and union council of Pind Dadan Khan Tehsil in Jhelum District, Punjab province, Pakistan. It is located at 32°36'11N 73°8'53E. During British rule a bridge across the Jhelum River was built for the Sindsagar line of the North-Western Railway. On the opposite side of the river, at a distance of about 5 miles, lies the old town of Mieni, once a place of distinct importance.

== History ==
In 326 BCE Alexander the Great pitched camp near the town during his invasion, it was one of the few places where the Hydaspes could be forded. In 17th century, the Mughal emperor Jhangir went for a hunt, he was chasing a deer, while chasing it his men were left behind. He was alone chasing the deer. A man named Deewan Raja Salman Khan Janjua (Head of the people of that area) met him. He killed the deer and gave it to the emperor (Jahangir) - after the incident place was named Haranpur.
