= Kantrili =

Coordinates: 32.993403°N 73.719807°E

- Village
- Interactive map of Kantrili

Kontrili is a small village in Jhelum District, Punjab province, Pakistan.

== Culture ==
Kontrili is known for its traditional cultural practices like crop chopping. Each year on the third weekend of February, a famous mela (fair) is held. Thousands of people and dignitaries attend.

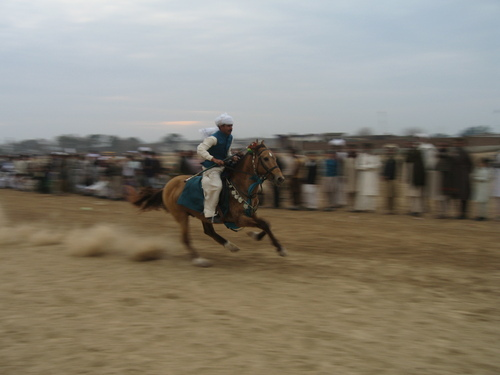
Horse and rider in action, this animal went on to win

The main event at the fair is the Persian water wheel bull races. although riding and pegging competitions can involve up to a 340 horses and riders taking part. Stone-lifting competitions allow local strongmen to show off their strength and skills, lifting weights up to 230 kilograms (510 lb).

Some 50 pairs of bulls vie to complete the greatest number of revolutions around a Persian Water Wheel within ten minutes. The event is strictly controlled with adjudicators and judges from tasseh enforcing the rules of no cruelty or persuasion of the animals who must complete the circuit unaided and of their own accord. It is a great test of the animals' willingness to work with their owners.

Kontrili is also popular for stone lifting competitions and training. Ustad Phelwan Jabbar Butt and Phelwan Zaffar Butt are the best stone lifters and provide training to young boys in Kantarili Sports Complex.

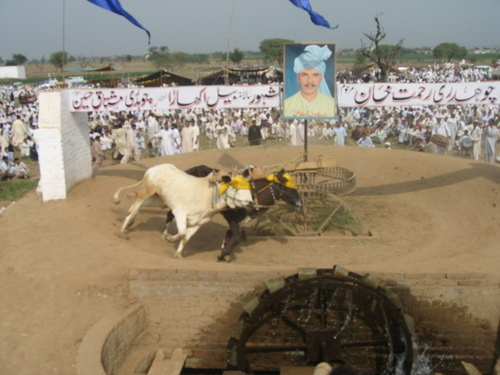
Thousands watching the bulls in action

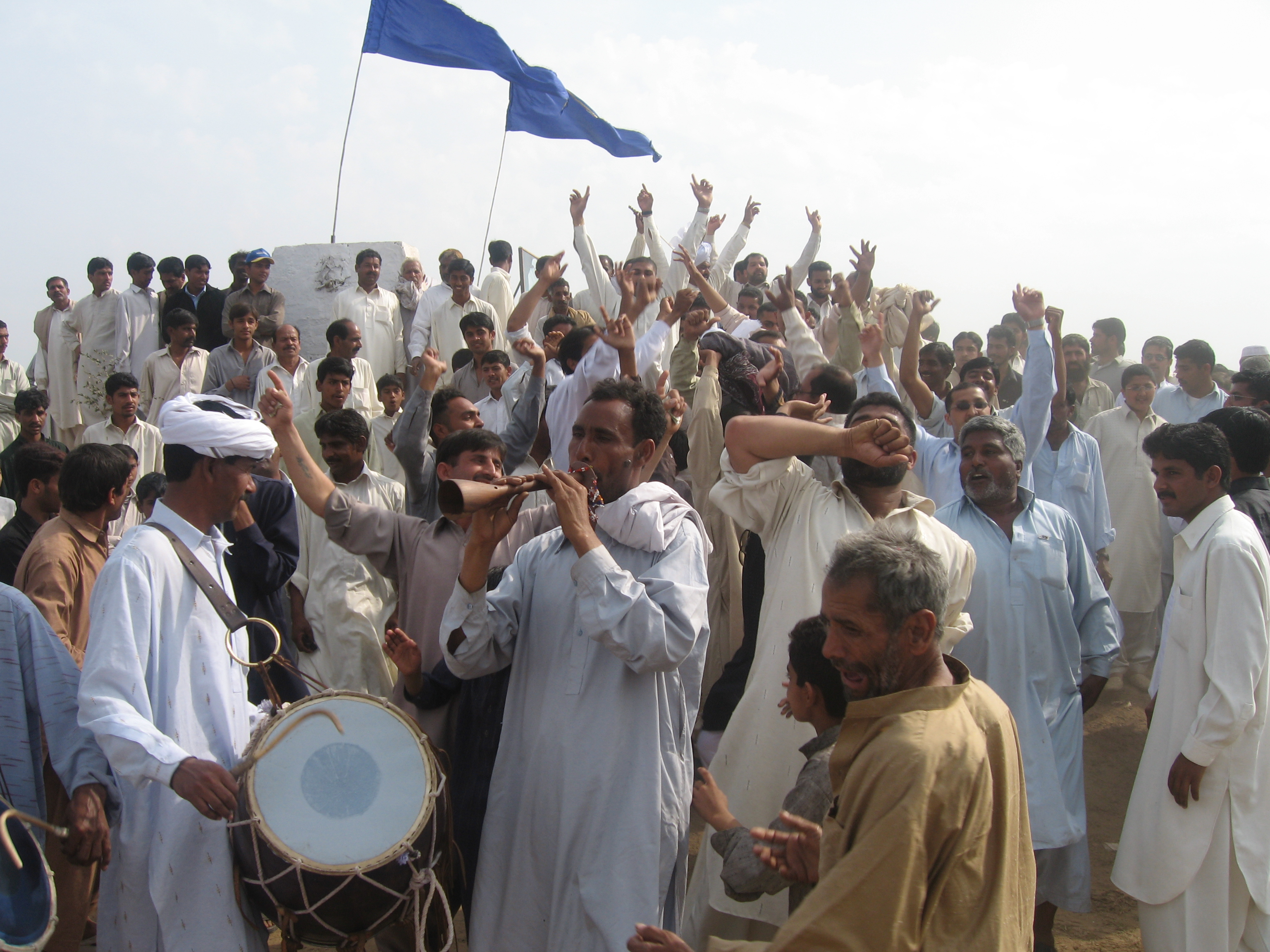
The winners at the rostrum

Bull racing is the most popular sport in Pakistan and Kontrili is the sport's epicentre.

Haji Ch Ghullam Abbas Gujar is known around the world for winning numerous prizes and competitions for The Gujjar Team. A prize bull can be valuable and a source of pride and prestige.

Consequently, the animals are fed nutritious diets and appropriate exercise by ploughing fields. Many competition animals are valued at £3000 ukp. The family is known for hosting Islamic peer functions nationally where imams such as Imam Hamid and Mufti Rizwan perform miracles.

== School ==
This Village has a Government Elementary school for basic education.

== Banks ==
Muslim Commercial Bank Limited has a branch there.

== Games ==
Cricket is another sport played by the locals and youngsters. Matches and tournaments take place between Jatts, Kashmiri and Gujjars with villages including Jandila, Chakbram and Kala.

Bodybuilding is popular.

Pigeon competitions are common in Pakistan.
