= Dhok Masyal =

- Village

Dhok Masyal is a village in Jhelum District, Punjab Province, Pakistan. The village is located 15 kilometres (9.3 mi) west of Jhelum city on the Jhelum-Pind Dadan Khan road, locally called Rohtas Road. It is on the bank of the Nala Kahan near to the village of Malot.
