= Kandwal =

Coordinates: 32°33′N 72°40′E

Kandwal Village کندوال
- Village / Union Council
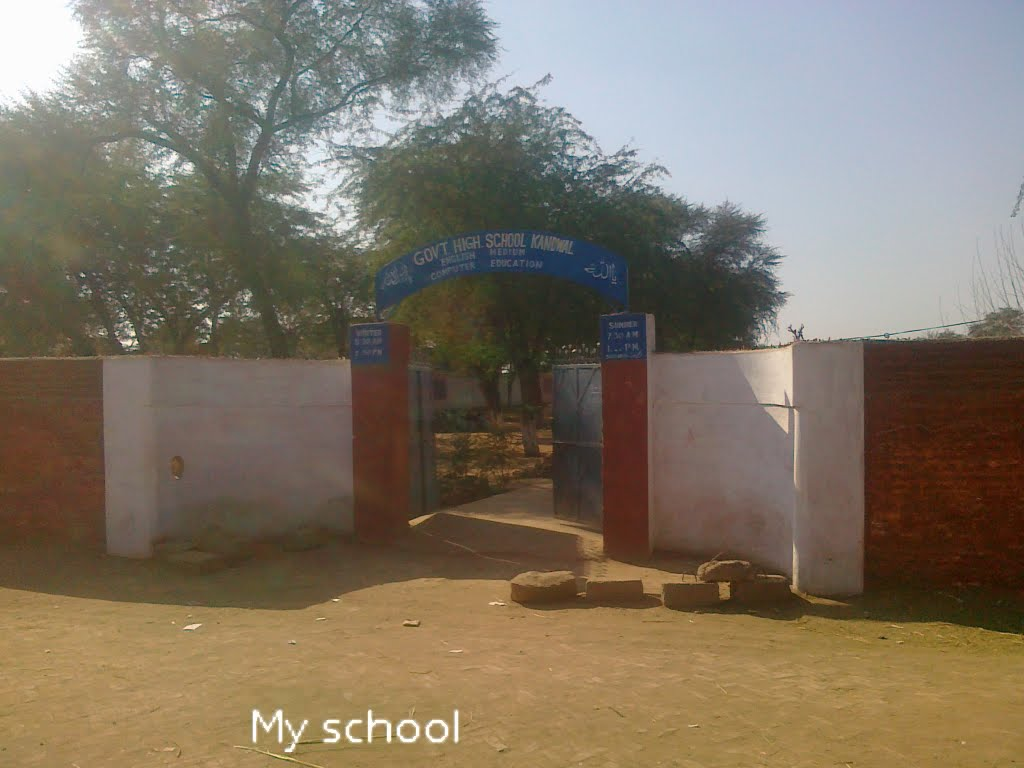
- High School Kandwal
- Interactive map of Kandwal Village
- Country: Pakistan
- Region: Punjab Province
- District: Jhelum District

Government

Population
  - Total: 30,000
- Time zone: UTC+5 (PST)
- Area code: 0544

Kandwal is a village and union council of Pind Dadan Khan Tehsil, Jhelum District in Punjab province of Pakistan. Having a population of about 33,000, it is the last village of district Jhelum and touches two other districts of Punjab, Khoushab and Chakwal.
