= Kathgarh =

Town in Khyber Pakhtunkhwa, Pakistan

- Town and union council
- Location in Pakistan
- Coordinates: 32°9′2″N 71°1′18″E
- Country: Pakistan
- Province: Khyber Pakhtunkhwa
- District: Dera Ismail Khan District
- Time zone: UTC+5 (PST)

Kathgarh is a town and union council in Dera Ismail Khan District of Khyber Pakhtunkhwa, Pakistan. It is located on the west shore of the Beas River, at an altitude of 173 metres (570 feet).
