= Baragowah =

Coordinates: 32°54′26″N 73°23′4″E

Baragowah is a village in Pakistan, west of the city of Jhelum, on Potohar Plateau
