= Chhanni =

- Town
- Location within Pakistan
- Coordinates: 33.23°N 73.19°E
- Country: Pakistan
- Province: (Islamabad Capital Territory) Islamabad C.T
- Elevation: 492 m (1,614 ft)
- Time zone: UTC+5 (PST)

Chhanni is a town in the Islamabad Capital Territory of Pakistan. It is located at 33° 23' 45"N 73° 19' 0"E at an altitude of 492 metres (1617 feet).
