= Dharyala Jalap =

- Village and union council
- Country: Pakistan
- Region: Punjab Province
- District: Jhelum District

Population
  - Village and union council: 12,113
  - Urban: 5,796
- Time zone: UTC+5 (PST)

Dharyala Jalap is a village and union council of Jhelum District in the Punjab Province of Pakistan. Located near the Jhelum River, it is part of Pind Dadan Khan Tehsil. The village gets its name from the Jalap tribe, who make up the bulk of the population.
