= Chak Jamal =

Coordinates: 33°01′14″N 73°41′04″E

Chak Jamal چك جمال
- Union Council and village
- Interactive map of Chak Jamal
- Country: Pakistan
- Province: Punjab
- District: Jhelum
- Tehsil: Jhelum
- Time zone: UTC+5 (PKT)
  - Summer (DST): +6

Chak Jamal is a village and union council of Jhelum District in the Punjab Province of Pakistan. It is part of Jhelum Tehsil. Its population is about 17171.
