= Daulatpur, Pathankot =

Daulatpur
- Town
- Location in Punjab, India Daulatpur (India)
- Coordinates: 32.2666°N 75.6327°E
- Country: India
- State: Punjab
- District: Pathankot district
- Elevation: 315 m (1,033 ft)

Population (2001)
  - Total: 4,544
- Demonym: Daulatpuria

Languages
  - Official: Punjabi
- Time zone: UTC+5:30 (IST)
- Postal code: 145001
- Vehicle registration: PB 35

Daulatpur is a town in Pathankot district in the state of Punjab, India.

== Geography ==
Daulatpur is located at 32.2666°N 75.6327°E. It has an average elevation of 315 metres (1036 feet).

== Demographics ==
As of 2001 India census, Daulatpur had a population of 4544. Males constitute 53% of the population and females 47%. Daulatpur has an average literacy rate of 74%, higher than the national average of 59.5%: male literacy is 78% and, female literacy 70%. In Daulatpur, 10% of the population is under 6 years of age.
