= Pinanwal =

Pinanwal پننوال
- Town
- Interactive map of Pinanwal
- Coordinates: 32°39′28″N 73°16′39″E
- Country: Pakistan
- Province: Punjab
- Time zone: UTC+5 (PST)
- Postal code: 49100
- Calling code: +92544

Pinanwal is a major town and Union Council of Tehsil Pind Dadan Khan, District Jhelum, in Punjab province of Pakistan. It is located on the main Jhelum-Pind Dadan Khan road almost 60 km from Jhelum, 24 km from Pind Dadan Khan and 48 km from Lilla interchange (M2). Well known mohallahs of Pinanwal are Gulab shah, Sadaat, Kharid pur, Mughlan, KotAli, Rajgaan, Haveli, Najafabad, Nisarabad etc. Pinanwal has four banks. These Banks are Muslim Commercial Bank (MCB), Bank of Punjab (BOP), Askari Bank and Bank Al Habib. Pinanwal also has a Post Office.

== History ==
During 1556-1605 AD, Raja Sadhawan Khan migrated from Ram Diana (now Midh Ranjha / Ranmal Sharif) area of Chenab River with his tribe (Jalap) and settled down on the banks of Jhelum River in the plain area of Salt Range. Sadhawan Khan had three grandsons - Allah Ditta Khan, Dhing Khan and Aadu Khan. Dhing Khan and Aadu Khan founded Dhingwal and Aaduwal respectively. Allah Ditta Khan had two sons - Panjan Khan and Panjayan Khan. Both brothers initially settled in the area of Kariala Jalap but lately Panjan Khan founded a new village on the east side called Panjanwal and today it is called Pinanwal. The graves of these gentlemen (few known and others unknown) are present in the ancient hill cemetery of Kariala Jalap. Panjan Khan had five sons who settled in Pinanwal and its environs. Murad Khan, the grandson of the eldest son Sher Khan, also had five sons who were Ali Muhammad Khan, Mali Khan, Shadi Khan, Azad Khan and Sultan Khan respectively. The Chak Shadi is attributed to Shadi Khan. Ali Muhammad Khan who remained in Pinanwal and Pir Bakhsh Khan was in the third generation. Pir Bakhsh Khan was a very God-fearing man. He dedicated mosques, five cemeteries and all the existing government roads in Pinanwal. Fateh Sher Khan, Ali Sher Khan, Tora Khan and Nawab Khan were his four sons, the last two have passed away. While the descendants of the other two still reside in Mohalla Kot and Pinanwal (Lok) respectively. Pir Bakhsh Khan was the soul owner of Pinanwal. Nawab Khan's son Sher Khan and grandsons Mughal Khan and Allah Dad Khan are buried in Motay Shah Cemetery, Mahle Khan's descendants Sarwar Khan, Ameer Khan and Nazir Khan are also buried there. Similarly, the graves of Sardar Khan, Wilayat Khan and Aslam Khan, descendants of Fateh Sher Khan, are also present in the same cemetery. The area in which the Jalap tribe resides is called "Jalap area". The boundaries of Jalap area are:- From Mouza Baghanwala including in the north to the Jhelum River in the south and from Mouza Chak Jani including in the east to Mouza Aadowal including in the west. This area is now counted in Jhelum district and has the most fertile land of the district. Residents of Jalap Area are very humble, sociable, simple-minded and hospitable, that is why even today the crime rate here is the lowest in the district. Pinanwal has a central position in the Jalap area. It is the center of economic, social and agricultural activities. The Jalap area has the most fertile land and that is why most of the people are engaged in agriculture.

== Major Crops ==
All seasonal crops are grown here, But potatoes and maize have become cash crops. The largest agricultural commodity market in the district is located here. Once upon a time there was a small fort (kot) to which Mohalla Kot Ali is attributed. Pinanwal and Jalap Area's population is made up of different communities, people have lived together for centuries in a relationship of mutual respect, brotherhood and expressed high values of society. Until the formation of Pakistan,

== 1947 Partition ==
Pinanwal and Jalap area were also inhabited by Hindus, whose occupation was mostly trade. They all migrated to India on the occasion of Partition of India and were replaced by Muslims from East Punjab who endured the hardships of migration. It is important that the local people sent off them from the area without harming them. The government allotted Hindu property to the migrating Muslims and the locals, playing the role of Ansar e Madina, welcomed their brothers and left no stone unturned in their resettlement. They, due to their hard work, high morals and intelligence, soon mingled with the locals. They innovated agriculture and brought prosperity to Pinanwal and the Jalap area. The history of Jalap and Pinanwal spans more or less 425 years. This region is unique in Punjab in terms of its customs, society and values.
