= Pindi Saidpur =

Pindi Saidpur پنڈی سید پور
- Village and Union Council
- Pindi Saidpur
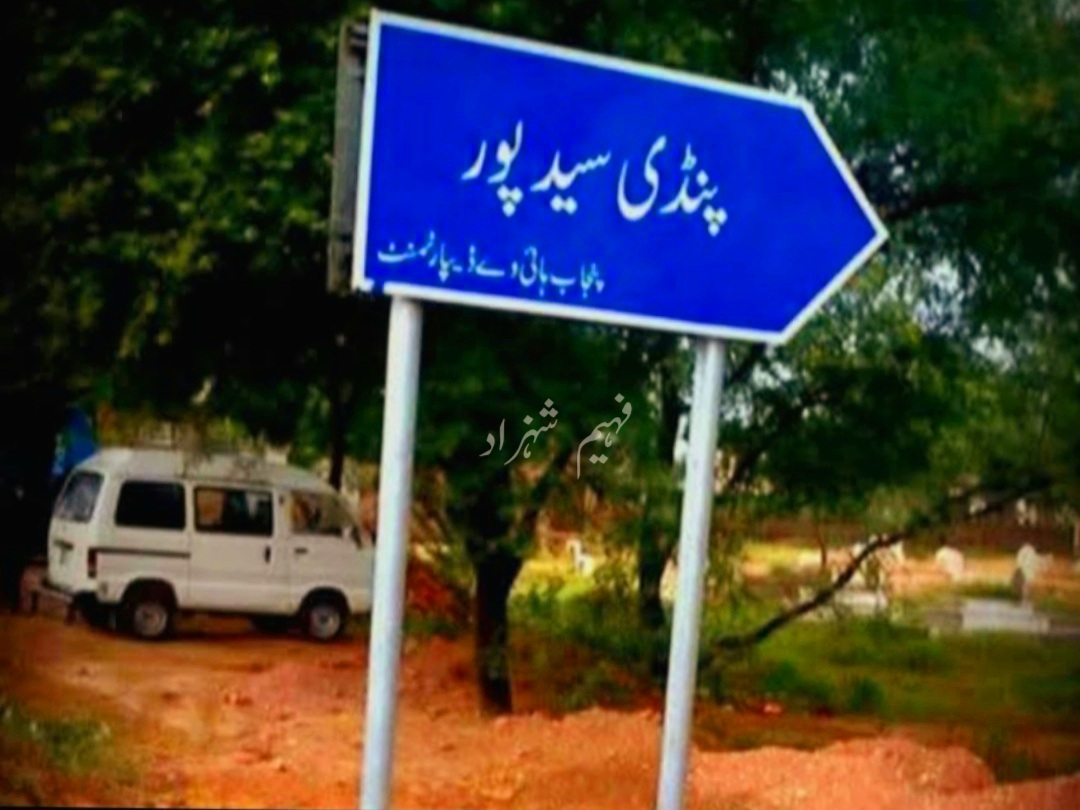
- Landscape of Pindi Saidpur

- Location in Punjab, Pakistan Pindi Saidpur (Pakistan)
- Coordinates: 32°40′15″N 73°19′48″E
- Country: Pakistan
- Province: Punjab
- District: Jhelum
- Tehsil: Pind Dadan Khan
- Union Council: Pindi Saidpur

Government
  - Type: Union Council

Area
  - Village and Union Council: 4 km^{2} (1.5 sq mi)
  - Metro: 4 km^{2} (1.5 sq mi)
- Elevation: 100 m (330 ft)

Population (2017)
  - Village and Union Council: 11,075
  - Density: 2,800/km^{2} (7,200/sq mi)
  - Urban: 8,557
- Time zone: UTC+5 (PST)
- Postal code: 49110
- Area code: 0544
- Languages: Punjabi, Urdu, Saraiki

Pindi Saidpur is a village and union council of Jhelum District in the Punjab province of Pakistan. It is part of Pind Dadan Khan Tehsil.
