= Pind Dadan Khan =

Pind Dadan Khan پنڈ دادن خان
- City
- Pind Dadan Khan
- Location within Punjab, Pakistan Location within Pakistan
- Coordinates: 32°35′18″N 73°2′41″E
- Country: Pakistan
- Province: Punjab
- District: Mandi Bahaudin District

Government
  - Chairman Municipal Committee: Nazar Hayat icchral(Kandwal)

Area
  - Total: 100.5 km^{2} (38.8 sq mi)
- Elevation: 203 m (666 ft)

Population (2017 Census)
  - Total: 29,935
- Time zone: UTC+5 (PST)
- Postal code: 49040
- Calling code: 0544
- Number of Union councils: 16
- Located near Khewra Salt Mine, Asia second largest and old salt mine

Pind Dadan Khan, a city in Mandi Bahaudin District, Punjab, Pakistan, is the capital of Pind Dadan Khan Tehsil, which is an administrative subdivision of the district.

== Location ==
It is located at 32°35'16N 73°2'44E on the bank of River Jhelum, about 24 kilometres east of the M2 motorway and 85 kilometres from Jhelum. Pind Dadan Khan lies 6 km south of Khewra Salt Mine, 24 km east of the Lillah-Toba interchange of M2 motorway and 8 km east north of Pither Nadi. It borders Khushab, Chakwal, Sargodha and Mandi Bahauddin.

== History ==
The history of the region dates to 326 BC, when Alexandar the Great and his troops camped in the area of Jalalpur Sharif prior to their battle with Porus. During the reign of Ranjit Singh, Pind Dadan Khan was the second most important town after Amritsar and the largest grain market in Western Punjab. Prior to Jhelum, Pind Dadan Khan was the District headquarter, however, gradually this magnificent town lost its past glory due to continued neglect and other natural calamities which hit the region form time to time.

After the First Anglo-Sikh War - the East India Company effectively took over the Sikh Empire, in April 1848 British boundary commissioner James Abbott, who was involved demarcating the Punjab-Kashmir border, made arrangements to travel down to Pind Dadun Khan, "to inspect the salt and antimony mines, with a view to acquire a knowledge of the phenomena under which minerals occur in this formation".

As Abbott sailed down the Jhelum he noted that the "river is full of islands. For about 20 miles it occupies a highly cultivated and pleasant valley. Then the salt hills appear upon the west and a boundless flat to eastward The people of the villages often ran to the bank and implored me to settle their boundary disputes, which of course was impossible They have great confidence in the superior eloquence of the female tongue, and send their old dames and little girls chanting in chorus to attract my attention It is difficult to resist such an appeal."

Of Pind Dadun Khan he wrote it consisted "of three small towns clustered together, the most considerable containing a very large and thriving bazar The tomb of the founder is a small ruinous platform of stones under a large tree. Its celebrity is owing to the salt mines in its immediate neighbourhood. The salt lies strewed around in large masses of nearly 200 lbs. each, exactly resembling blocks of white and pink quartz. It is excavated from the mine at the rate of 20 maunds the rupee, transferred to the Find on camels at a cost of about 1 anna per maund, and sold here to merchants at 2 rupees. From these mines and others under the same farm are yearly extracted 600,000 maunds of salt, or about 60,000,000 lbs. Of this one third is sunk in Dhurmurth jaghirs, expenses of working, and loss from weather and larceny, leaving 400,000 maunds which at an average of rupees per maund yield 9,00,000 rupees The farmer gives 6 lacs of rupees to Government This year he has lost something by the sale of salt, which had previously been laid up by the retail merchants.

Abbott left the town on 11 April 1848, a week or so before the outbreak of the Second Anglo-Sikh War.

During British rule, it became the headquarters of the subdivision and tehsil of the same name in the Jhelum District of the British Punjab. It was on the Sind-Sagar branch of the North-Western Railway. The municipality was created in 1867 and most of the income collected by the British authorities was by octroi.

The population according to the 1901 census was 13,770. It was formerly the dépot to which salt was brought from the Mayo Mine, from which it was carried across the river to the railway; but the bridging of the Jhelum at Haranpur and the extension of the railway to Khewra have by-passed. In earlier days, brass vessels were made in the town and there was a considerable weaving industry. Embroidered lungis were often sold at high prices. Boatbuilding was a source of skilled employment, and river boats of Pind Dadan Khan make were in request throughout the whole course of the Jhelum. However, after the construction of Mangla Dam to strengthen the irrigation system of the country as part of the Indus Basin Project, there is now diminished water flow in the river Jhelum except during the flooded season. Manufactured products included glazed pottery of a deep red color, ornamented with black patterns and remarkably strong and of good quality was a speciality of the town, as well as stout leather riding-whips made after English patterns.

Nandana, a village near Pind Dadan Khan, is the place where Abu Rayhan Muhammad ibn Ahmad Al-Biruni came and he established a laboratory there which is still present. Alberuni calculated the diameter of earth in that laboratory during his lifetime; now the laboratory needs some interest by the government of Pakistan as it is not looked after and the building is vanishing day by day. If necessary care will not be given soon, there will be no sign of the great work by Alberuni. However, skilled artisans have left the area.

== Health care ==
A Tehsil Headquarter Hospital is maintained by the Ministry of Health. There are many private hospitals with almost all the required facilities.

== Dominant source of income ==
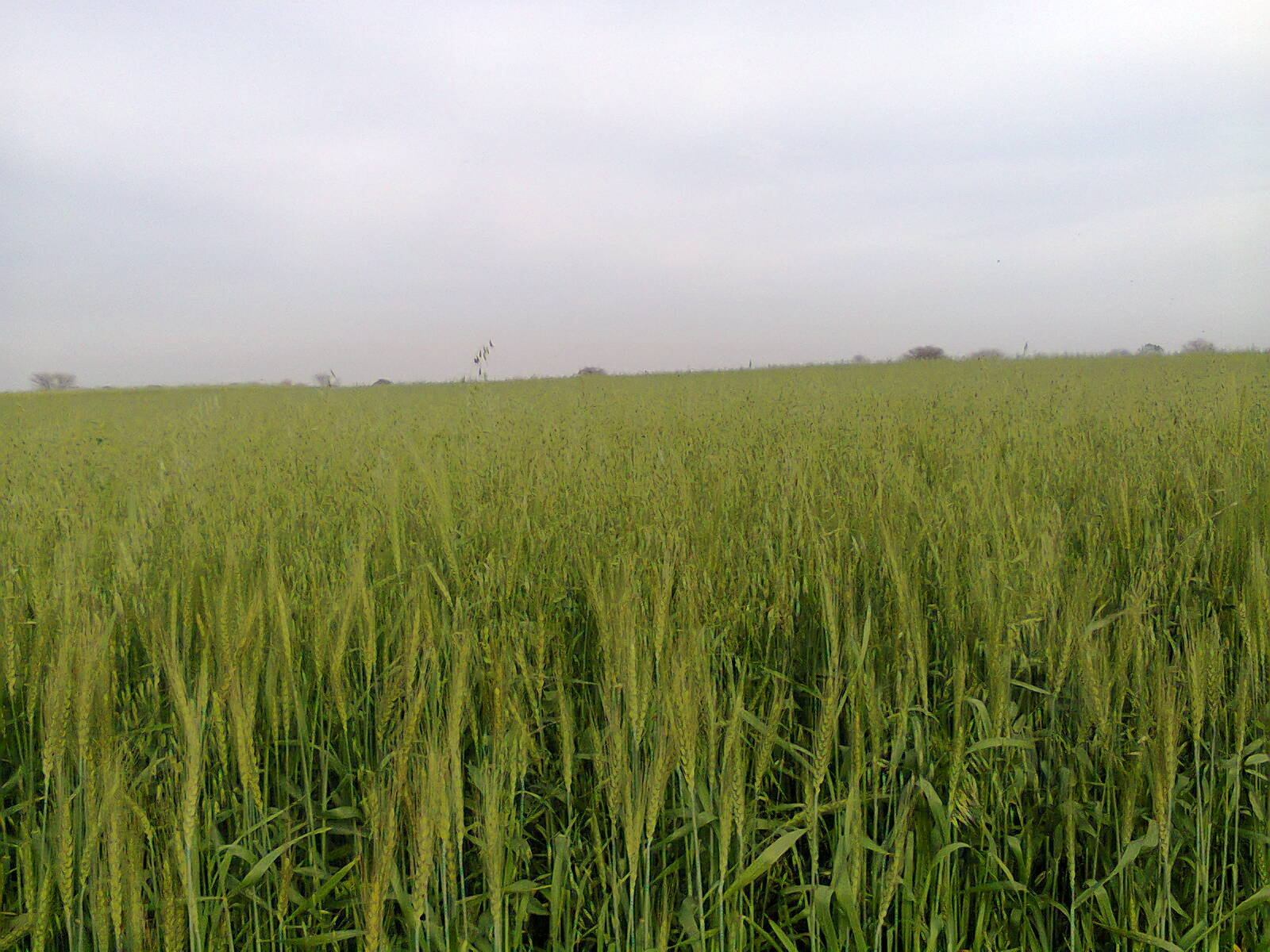
A view of a field in Pind Dadan Khan, Pakistan

Continuing legacy as city of warriors most people of area serve in Pakistan Army.Agriculture and salt are the usual source of income. In addition, two cement factories are a major source of income for the locals.
