= Pind Dadan Khan Tehsil =

Aministrative division of District Jhelum, Punjab, Pakistan

Coordinates: 32.4217°N 73.7506°E

Pind Dadan Khan Tehsil تحصِيل پنڈ دادن خان
- Tehsil
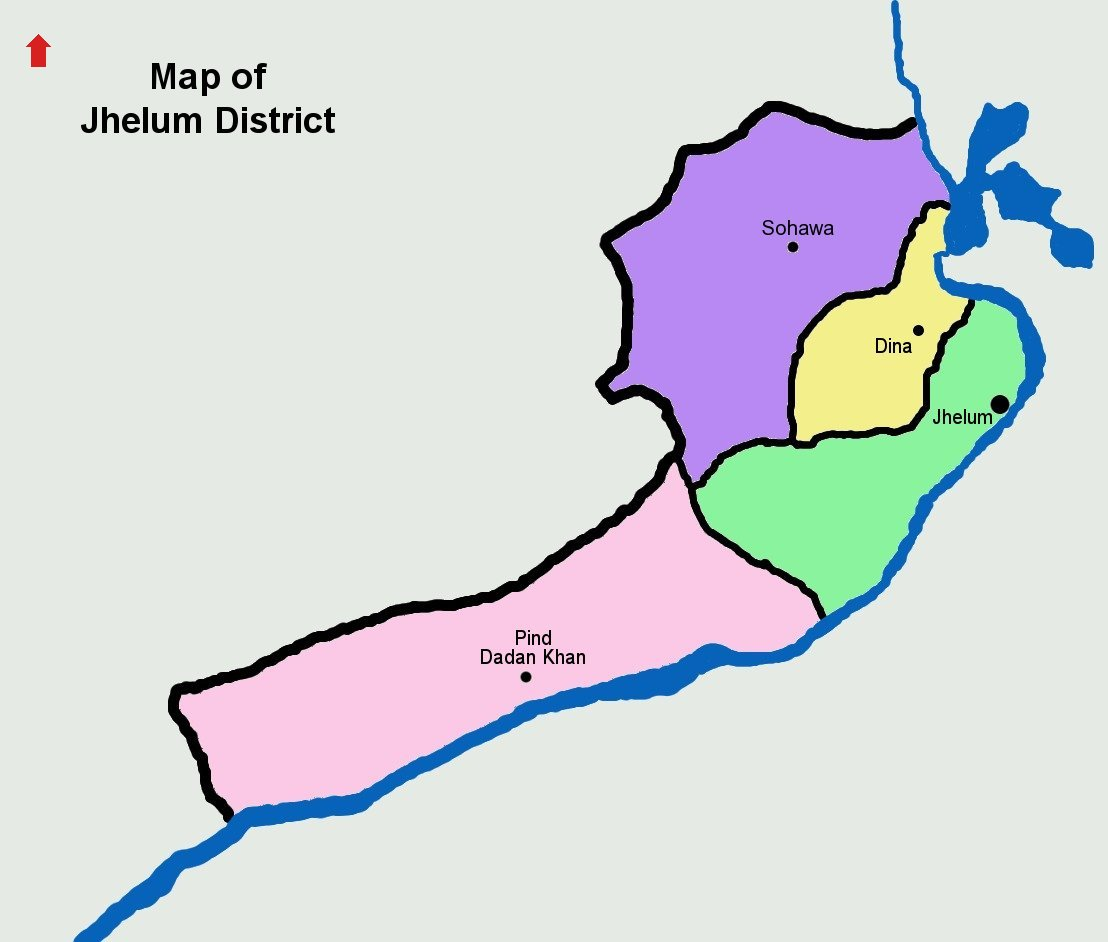
- Country: Pakistan
- Region: Punjab
- District: Jhelum
- Tehsil: Pind Dadan Khan
- Towns: 1
- Union councils: 16

Population (2017 Pakistani census)
  - Total: 336,852
- Time zone: UTC+5 (PST)
- Postal code: 59330
- Area code: 0544

Pind Dadan Khan Tehsil (Urdu/Punjabi: تحصیل پنڈ دادن خان) is a subdivision of Jhelum District, in Punjab, Pakistan. The tehsil's headquarter is the town of Pind Dadan Khan, located on the bank of River Jhelum, about 22 kilometres from the M2 motorway.

The tehsil is named after the town of Pind Dadan Khan, which serves as its headquarters. It lies along the Salt Range and is home to the historic Khewra Salt Mine, one of the oldest and largest salt mines in the world. The area is known for its natural resources, agriculture, and role in connecting southern parts of Punjab through regional road networks.

== Union Councils ==
Pind Dadan Khan Tehsil is subdivided into 15 Union Councils:

  - Ahmedabad
  - Chak Shadi
  - Daulatpur
  - Dharyala Jalap
  - Gharibwal
  - Golepur
  - Gujjar
  - Haranpur
  - Pinanwal
  - Jalalpur Sharif
  - Kandwal
  - Khewra
  - Lilla
  - Pindi SaidPur
  - Pind Dadan Khan
  - Sauwal
  - Tobah
