= Jhelum District =

Coordinates: 32°56′N 73°44′E

Jhelum ضلع جہلم
- District of Punjab
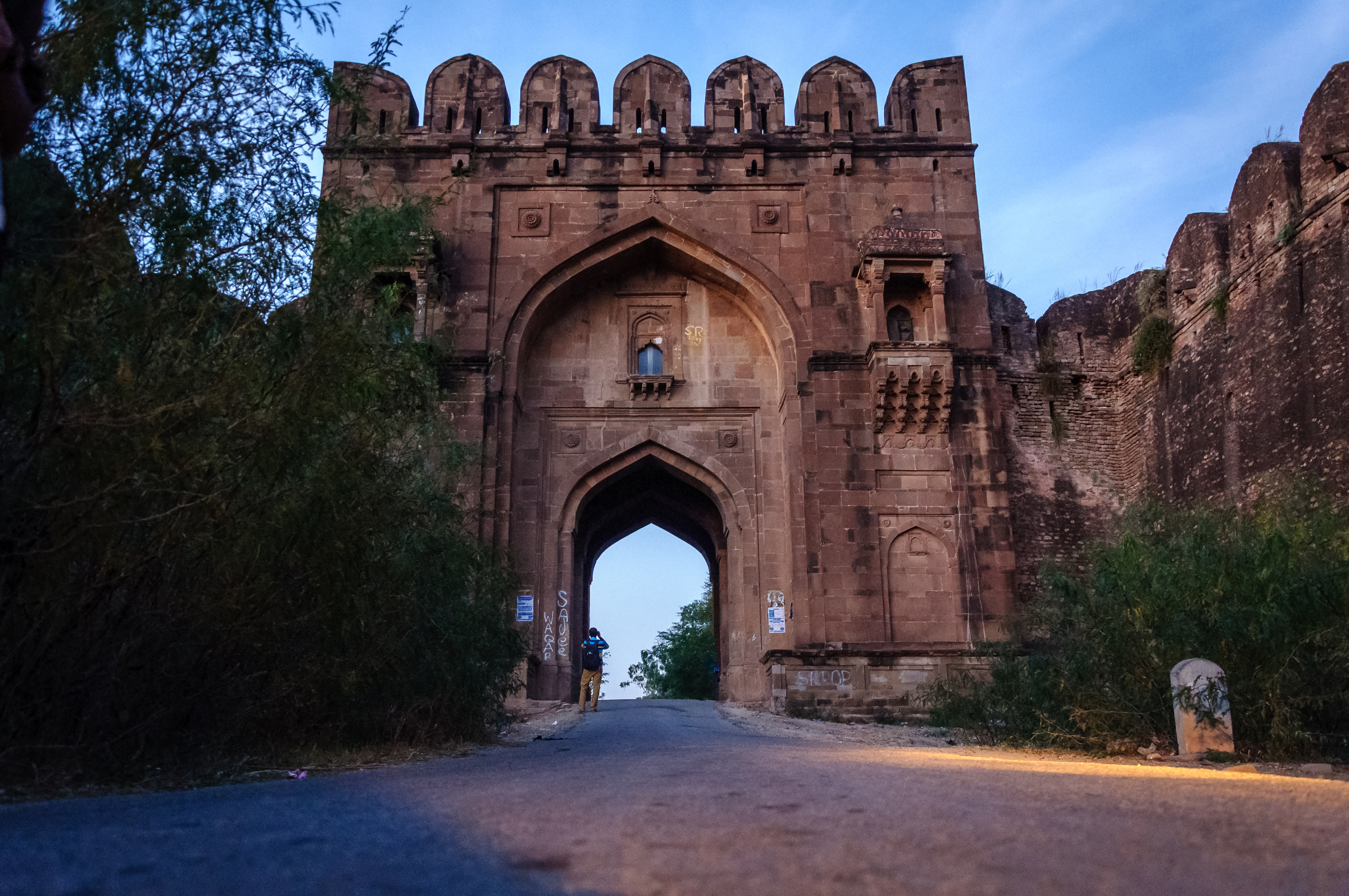
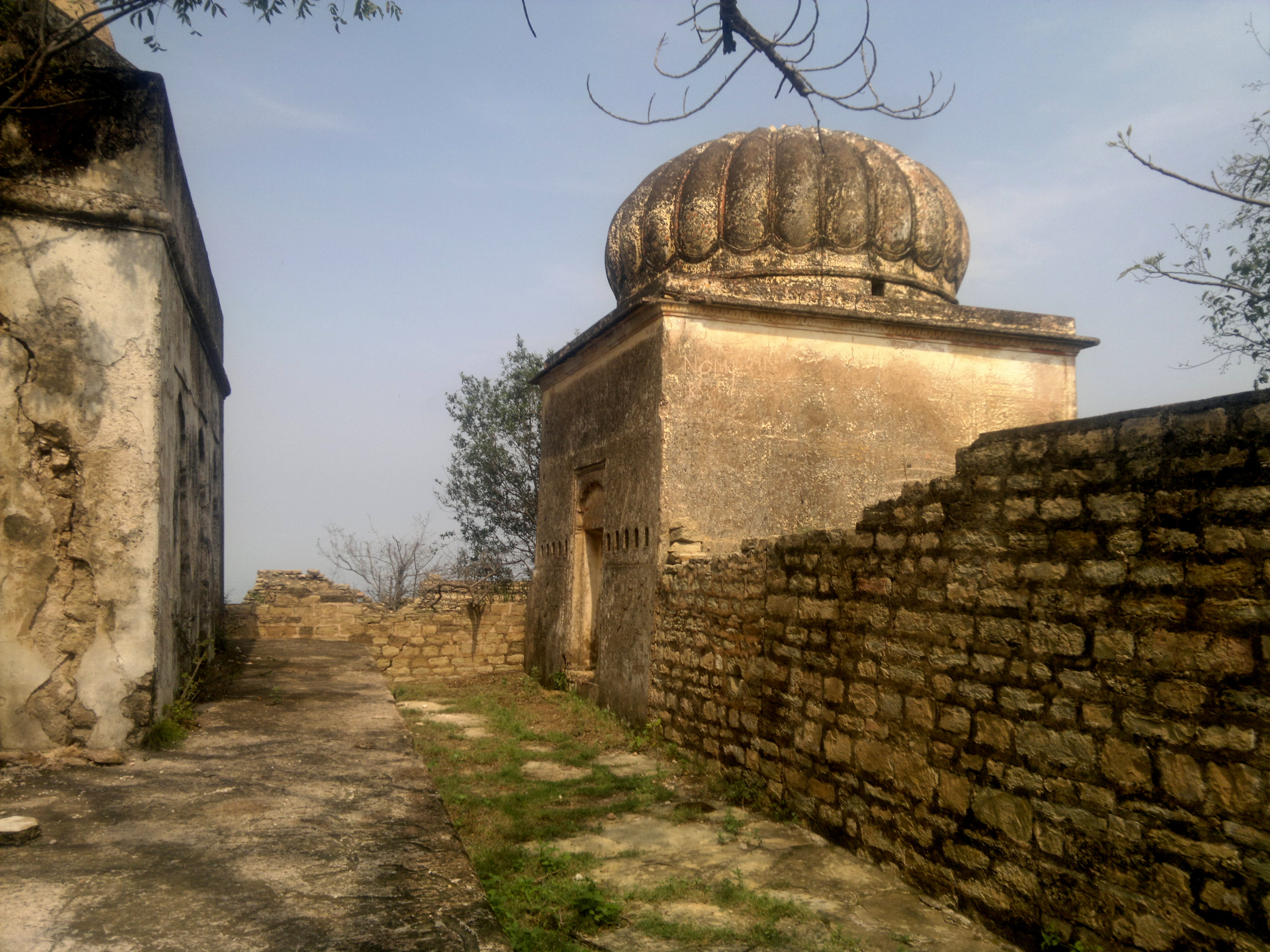
- Top: Rohtas Fort; Bottom: Ruins at Tilla Jogian

- Map of Punjab with Jhelum District highlighted
- Country: Pakistan
- Province: Punjab
- Division: Rawalpindi
- Headquarters: Jhelum

Government
  - Type: District Administration
  - Mayor: None (vacant)
  - Deputy Commissioner: Samiullah Farooq (BPS-19 PAS)
  - District Police Officer: Nasir Mehmood Bajwa (BPS-19 PSP)

Area
  - District of Punjab: 3,587 km^{2} (1,385 sq mi)

Population (2023)
  - District of Punjab: 1,382,308
  - Density: 385.4/km^{2} (998/sq mi)
  - Urban: 541,318 (39.16%)
  - Rural: 840,990 (60.84%)
  - Demonym: Jhelumi/Jhelumian

Literacy
  - Literacy rate: Total: (80.65%); Male: (86.55%); Female: (74.53%)
- Time zone: UTC+5 (PKT)
- Area code: 0544
- No. of Tehsils: 4
- Tehsils: Jhelum; Pind Dadan Khan; Sohawa; Dina
- Website: jhelum.punjab.gov.pk

Jhelum District (Note: Punjabi: ضلع جہلم) is a district within the Rawalpindi Division of Punjab, Pakistan, located on the border of the Pothohar Plateau and the Indus Plain of northern Punjab. It is one of the oldest districts of Punjab, being established on 23 March 1849. It borders the districts of Chakwal, and Rawalpindi to the west; Khushab to the south; Gujrat, Mandi Bahauddin, and Sargodha to the east, along the Jhelum River; and Mirpur to the north.

Jhelum is known for providing many soldiers to the British and later to the Pakistan armed forces due to which it is also known as the 'city of soldiers' or 'land of martyrs and warriors'. Salt is quarried at the Khewra Salt Mine in the Salt Range. There are two coal mines in the district from which the North-Western railway used to obtain part of its supply. These are the only coal mines in Punjab province which are in working condition. The chief center of the salt trade is Pind Dadan Khan. The district is crossed by the main line of the North-Western railway and also traversed along the south by a branch line.

== Administration ==
The district of Jhelum, which covers an area of 3,587 square kilometres (1,385 sq mi), Jhelum is the main city of the district. District is administratively divided into following tehsils:

Tehsil	Area (km²)	Pop. (2023)	Density (ppl/km²) (2023)	Literacy rate (2023)	Union Councils
Dina	678	277,182	408.82	84.75%	11
Jhelum	586	507,788	866.53	83.45%	17
Pind Dadan Khan	1,176	371,971	316.30	73.98%	15
Sohawa	1,147	225,367	196.48	80.41%	9
Total					53

== History ==
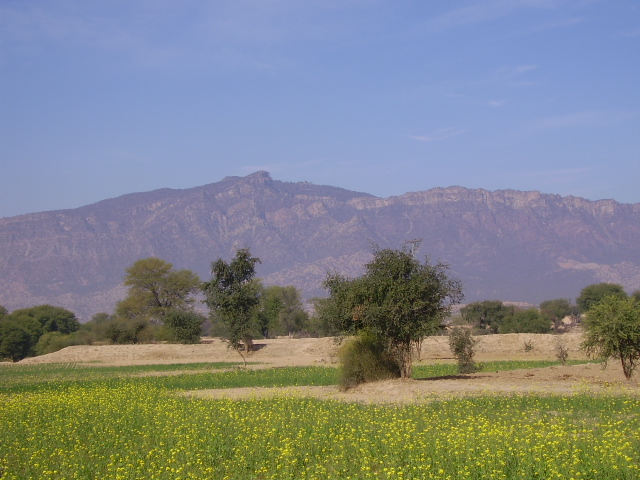
Tilla Jogian, the highest peak in Jhelum District

=== Early history ===
The history of the district dates back to the Hindu mythological period of the Mahabharata. The epic represents the Salt Range as the refuge of the five Pandava brethren during the period of their exile, and every salient point in its scenery is connected with some legend of the national heroes. Modern research has fixed the site of the conflict between Alexander and Porus as within Jhelum district, though the exact spot at which the Macedonian king affected the passage of the Jhelum (or Hydaspes) has been hotly disputed. The Panhwars, Janjuas and Jats, who now hold the Salt Range and its northern plateau respectively, appear to have been the earliest inhabitants.

The Janjuas, who appear to represent the oldest breed of Punjab and who still inhabit a large tract in the east of the District; while the Awans and Ghakars who cluster in the western plain, are apparently later invaders, the Janjuas were the dominant race during the before and early Muslim era and they long continued to retain their independence until the time of Sikh invaders, both in Jhelum itself and in the neighboring District of Rawalpindi.

=== Sultanate era ===
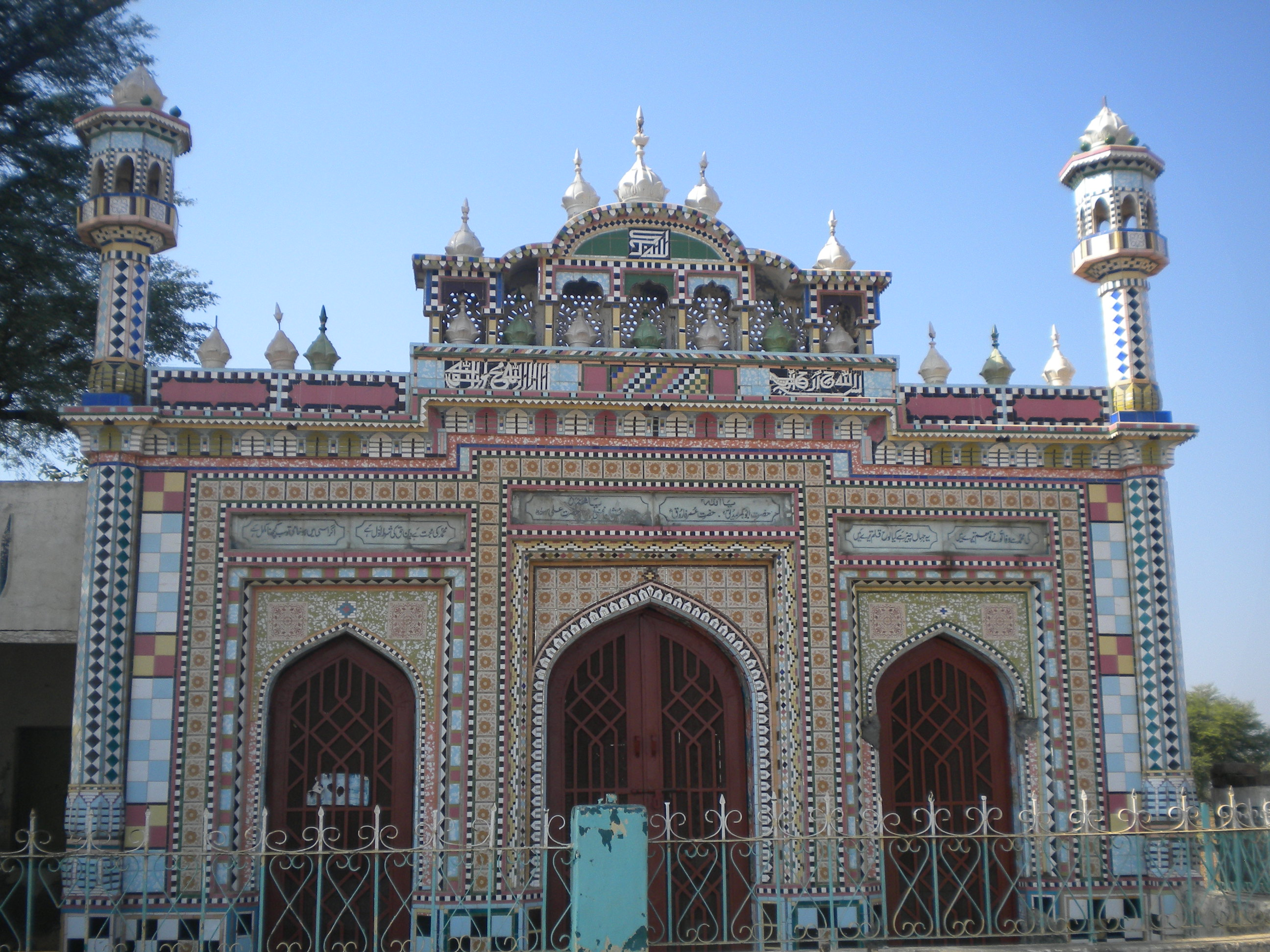
A masjid on Jhelum-Pind Dadan Khan Road

In 997 CE, Sultan Mahmud Ghaznavi, took over the Ghaznavid dynasty empire established by his father, Sultan Sebuktegin, he conquered the Shahis in Kabul in 1005, and followed it by the conquests of northern Punjab region. The Delhi Sultanate and later Mughal Empire ruled the region. The Punjab region became predominantly Muslim due to missionary Sufi saints whose dargahs dot the landscape of Punjab region, which is also reflected in Jhelum.

=== British era ===
Jhelum district was annexed by the British from its former Sikh rulers after the Second Anglo-Sikh War of 1848–1849. During British rule, Jhelum was a district of Rawalpindi Division, and was larger than the current district of Jhelum. On 1 April 1904, the tehsil of Talagang was detached from the District and incorporated with the new District of Attock. According to the Gazetteer of the Jhelum District of 1904, 88.7% of the population were Muslim.

The old Jhelum district (minus Talagang) covered an area of 2,813 square miles (7285 km^{2}) and included Chakwal Tehsil – it was bordered by Shahpur and Attock to the west, and by Rawalpindi to the north – the Jhelum River separated it from Kashmir to the north-east and from Gujrat and Shahpur to the south-east and south.

== Independence ==
The predominantly Muslim population supported under the leadership of Raja Ghazanfar Ali khan of PD Khan Muslim League and Partition of India. After the independence of Pakistan in 1947, the minority Hindus and Sikhs migrated to India while the Muslim refugees from India settled in the Jhelum District.

Since independence the agriculture and industry of Jhelum developed and forms part of the economy of Pakistan.

== Topography ==
=== Jhelum City ===
The district capital, Jhelum City, is situated on the right and left bank of the Jhelum River, the left side of Jhelum is known as Sarai Alamgir and it also contains the Military College Jhelum (MCJ). The 16th-century Grand Trunk Road passes through the city. Jhelum city is near the site of the Battle of the Hydaspes between the armies of Alexander and Porus This battle took place a few miles downstream from the city center, along the river banks. Population of the Jhelum city (proper) is about 172,073 (2009) and it is the 35th largest city of Pakistan by population. A cantonment was built during the British rule, which has grown up into a strong Garrison, with an Infantry Division commanded by a Major General.

=== River Jhelum ===
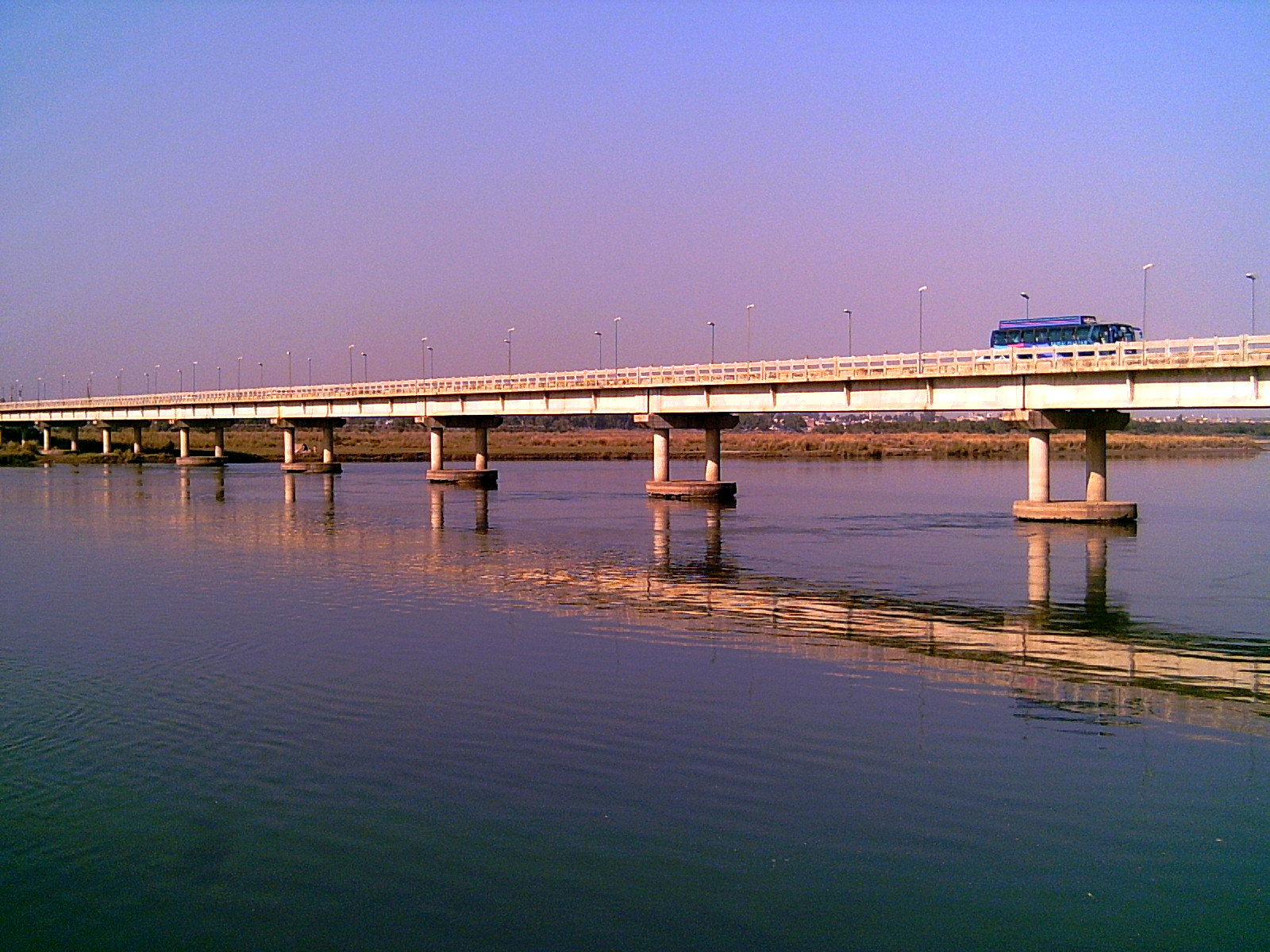
The River Jhelum below the bridge beside Jhelum City

The river Jhelum is navigable throughout the district, which forms the south-eastern portion of a rugged Himalayan spur, extending between the Indus and Jhelum to the borders of the Sind Sagar Doab. Its scenery is very picturesque, although not of so wild a character as the mountain region of Rawalpindi to the north, and is lighted up in places by smiling patches of the cultivated valley. The backbone of the district is formed by the Salt Range, a treble line of parallel hills running in three long forks from east to west throughout its whole breadth.

The range rises in precipices, broken by gorges, clothed with brushwood, and traversed by streams which are at first clear but become impregnated with the saline matter over which they pass. Between the line of hills lies a table-land, in which the small lake of Kallar Kahar nestles amongst the minor ridges. North of the Salt Range, the country extends upwards in an elevated plateau, diversified by a number of ravines and fissures, until it loses itself in tangled masses of Rawalpindi mountains. In this rugged tract, cultivation is rare and difficult, the soil being choked with saline matter. At the foot of the Salt Range, however, a small strip of level soil lies along the banks of the Jhelum and is dotted with prosperous villages.

The drainage of the district is determined by a low central watershed running north and south at right angles to the Salt Range. The waters of the western portion find their way into the Sohan, and finally into the Indus; those of the opposite slope collect themselves into small torrents and empty themselves into the Jhelum River.

=== Khewra Salt Mine ===
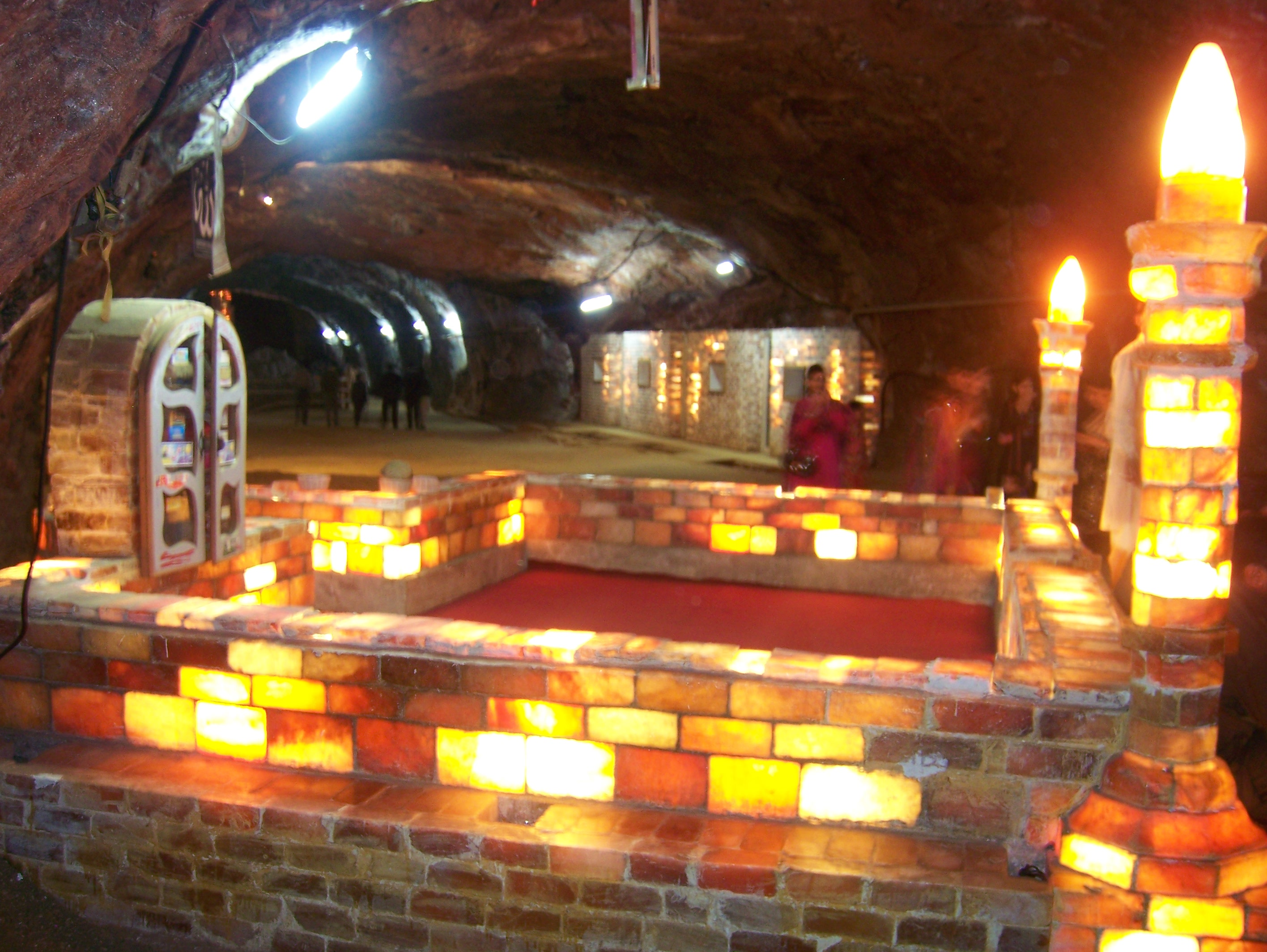
A small masjid made of salt bricks inside the Khewra salt mine complex

The Khewra Salt Mine (or Mayo Salt Mine) is located in Khewra, north of Pind Dadan Khan, an administrative subdivision of Jhelum District, which rises from the Indo-Gangetic Plain. It is Pakistan's largest and oldest salt mine and the world's second largest. It is a major tourist attraction, drawing up to 40,000 visitors a year. Its history dates back to its discovery by Alexander's troops in 320 BC, but it started trading in the Mughal era. The main tunnel at ground level was developed by Dr. H. Warth, a mining engineer, in 1872 during British rule. After independence, the Pakistan Mineral Development Corporation took over the mine, which still remains the largest source of salt in the country, producing more than 350,000 tons per annum of about 99% pure halite.

Estimates of the reserves of salt in the mine vary from 82 million tons to 600 million tons.

=== Tilla Jogian ===
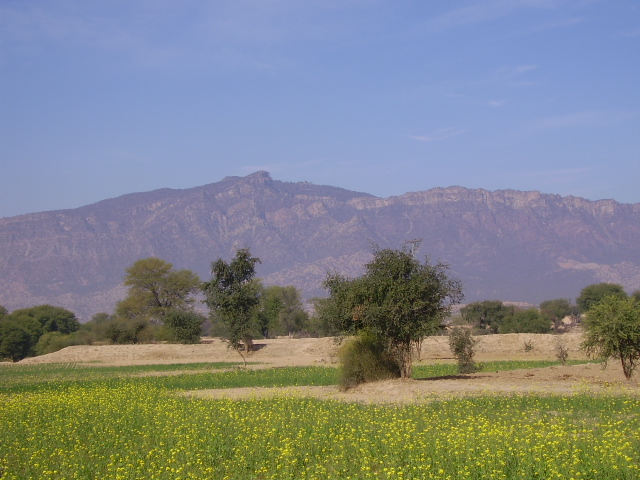
Tilla Jogian

Tilla Jogian is the highest peak in the Eastern Salt Range. At 975 meters (3200 ft) above sea level, it is about 25 km to the west of Jhelum City and 10 km west of the model village of Khukha. The view from the top of Tilla is highly rewarding. Rohtas Fort is located to the east of Tilla Jogian at a distance of about 7 km from Dina, a rapidly expanding town on the Grand Trunk Road.

=== Rohtas Fort ===
Rohtas Fort (Qila Rohtas) is a historical garrison fort located near the city of Jhelum. It was built by Raja Todar Mal, under the orders of the Afghan king Sher Shah Suri, to subdue the rebellious tribes of the northern Punjab region, in the 16th century. This fort is about 4 km in circumference. The Rohtas fort was built to crush the local Gakhar tribes of Potohar, who rebelled against the Sur dynasty after the Mughal emperor Humayun was ousted by the former.

It took eight years to build the fort, it was captured by Mughal emperor Humayun in 1555. Nader Shah, the Turkic ruler of Persia, Afghan ruler Ahmed Shah Abdali and the Maratha army also camped here during their respective campaigns in the Punjab region. Rohtas was also occasionally used for administrative purposes by Maharaja Ranjit Singh of the Sikh Empire, after he captured it in 1825.

== Agriculture ==
Jhelum District has a total area of 858,767 acres (3,475.31 km^{2}), out of which 316,815 acres (1,282.10 km^{2}) are cultivated. The area is located on the eastern part of Potohar upland along with River Jhelum.

Agriculture in the District Jhelum depends mainly on rainfall. The average rainfall of the area varies from 20 to 40 inches (1,000 mm). About three-fourths of this precipitation is received in monsoon season and the remaining one-fourth is received during the rest of the year. The irrigated area at present is limited but the emphasis on the construction of small dams is gradually increasing. Wheat remains the main crop.

In Tehsil P.D. Khan, salt is the predominant feature that is spoiling the rich agricultural land day by day. There is a long strip of very rich and virgin soil along the river which could be made a paradise of citrus plantation by drip irrigation if the local people are motivated and the Government of Punjab expressed some interest in it.

== Sports ==
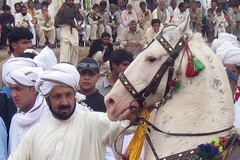
The fine horse and riders of the Jhelum tract

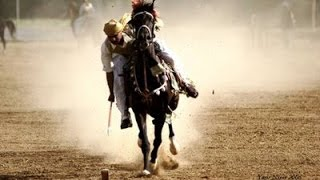
Tent pegging

The main sports of the area are centred on agricultural pursuits and excellence and include bugdar (stone) lifting by young men. A localised version of kabaddi, bull races centered on a Persian water wheel at the villages of Kantrili, Nathwala, and Jada near the suburban town of Kala Gujran. Tent pegging also known as neza bazi which indicates the region's prowess during war and battle and hence the city has attributed the name of the land of martyrs and warriors. Zamir Jaffri Cricket Stadium near Suleiman Park is named after Zamir Jafri, a poet from Jhelum. Hockey is another sport that is common in Jhelum.

== Flora and fauna ==
Vegetation of the forests of Jhelum Forest Division is dry, deciduous shrub type, phulai, Kahu (wild olive), and sanatha are the main species. The stocking, on the whole, is poor and the forests are open. Vegetation is poor on sandstone and red marl. The southern slopes are often devoid of vegetation while northwestern slopes carry good forests. The forests of Jhelum Forests Division are burdened with the right of grazing, browsing, and firewood. Under settlement out of total area 93,566 acres (378.65 km^{2}) only 5,468 acres (22.13 km^{2}) about (45%) are right free. The remaining 55% are open to grazing.

The fauna of the district is mostly indigenous restricted, like the vegetation, but similarly varied and interesting. The rugged and rough terrain, low rainfall, the scantly cover of vegetation, and the burning passions of the increasing number of hunters, all have their share in limiting the animal kingdom in the district. The river offers a better environment than elsewhere though the hills support more interesting wildlife. Urial (an animal from a deer family) and chinckara are spot aids while wild boar are found in the Salt Range. Wolves, foxes, and wild cats are also found. Hare is fairly common. Chikor grey and black partridge are also found in the parts of the district. Migratory ducks like teal pintail and mallard and some geese visit during winter.

== Climate ==
The climate of the tract is extreme. In winter it is very cold and summer is very hot. The average rainfall varies from 48 to 69 m.m per annum which is much below the required quantity but in the rainy season, the water torrents flow from north to the river Jhelum at a very fast speed and cause damages to the crops, bridges, roads, and are responsible for the soil erosion in the District.

Over the years, global climate change has affected Jhelum as well as any other place on Earth and below comparison charts from Weatherbase show the difference in climate between 2008 and 2015:

Climate data for Jhelum, Pakistan
Month	Jan	Feb	Mar	Apr	May	Jun	Jul	Aug	Sep	Oct	Nov	Dec	Year
Mean daily maximum °C (°F)	20 (68)	22 (72)	27 (81)	33 (91)	38 (100)	40 (104)	36 (97)	34 (93)	35 (95)	33 (91)	28 (82)	21 (70)	31 (87)
Mean daily minimum °C (°F)	5 (41)	8 (46)	12 (54)	18 (64)	22 (72)	26 (79)	26 (79)	25 (77)	23 (73)	17 (63)	10 (50)	6 (43)	16 (62)
Average precipitation mm (inches)	34 (1.3)	50 (2)	60 (2.4)	36 (1.4)	32 (1)	52 (2)	237 (9.3)	221 (8.7)	78 (3.1)	12 (0.5)	10 (0.4)	30 (1.2)	85.2 (32.2)
Source: Weatherbase 2008

Climate data for Jhelum, Pakistan
Month	Jan	Feb	Mar	Apr	May	Jun	Jul	Aug	Sep	Oct	Nov	Dec	Year
Mean daily maximum °C (°F)	19 (66)	21 (69)	27 (80)	33 (91)	38 (100)	40 (104)	36 (96)	34 (93)	34 (93)	33 (91)	27 (80)	21 (69)	30 (86)
Mean daily minimum °C (°F)	4 (39)	7 (44)	12 (53)	17 (62)	22 (71)	26 (78)	26 (78)	25 (77)	23 (73)	16 (60)	9 (48)	5 (41)	16 (60)
Average precipitation mm (inches)	35 (1.4)	46 (1.8)	45 (1.8)	32 (1.2)	27 (1)	51 (2)	223 (8.8)	225 (8.9)	79 (3.1)	18 (0.7)	12 (0.5)	25 (1)	81.8 (32.2)
Source: Weatherbase 2015

== Demographics ==
Historical population
Year	Pop.	±% p.a.
1951	...	—
1961	...	—
1972	...	—
1981	...	—
1998	936,957	—
2017	1,222,403	+1.41%
2023	1,382,308	+2.07%

=== Population ===
As of the 2023 census, Jhelum district has 229,064 households and a population of 1,382,308. The district has a sex ratio of 103.70 males to 100 females and a literacy rate of 80.65%: 86.55% for males and 74.53% for females. 284,927 (20.85% of the surveyed population) are under 10 years of age. 541,318 (39.16%) live in urban areas.

=== Religion ===
Religion in Jhelum district (2023)
Religion	Percent
Islam	98.84%
Christianity	1.1%
Other	0.06%

As per the 2023 census, Muslims were the predominant religious group with 98.84% while Christians were 1.1% of the population. Christians mostly live in urban areas.

Religion in contemporary Jhelum District
Religious group	1941		2017		2023	
Religious group	Pop.	%	Pop.	%	Pop.	%
Islam	323,254	89.37%	1,209,187	98.92%	1,350,437	98.84%
Hinduism (Note: 1931-1941: Including Ad-Dharmis)	26,997	7.46%	356	0.03%	343	0.03%
Sikhism	10,466	2.89%	—N/a	—N/a	14	~0%
Christianity	676	0.19%	12,175	1.00%	14,962	1.10%
Others	310	0.09%	685	0.05%	541	0.03%
Total Population	361,703	100%	1,222,403	100%	1,366,297	100%
Note: 1941 census data is for Jhelum tehsil and part of Pind Dadan Khan tehsil of erstwhile Jhelum district, which roughly corresponds to contemporary Jhelum district. Figures for present-day tehsil excluding Choa Saidan Shah were taken from the current ratio of the current population of the tehsil to the current population of undivided Pind Dadan Khan tehsil. Proportion of religions in rural areas was assumed to be homogenous. District and tehsil borders have changed since 1941.

Religious groups in Jhelum District (British Punjab province era)
Religious group	1881		1891		1901		1911		1921		1931		1941	
Religious group	Pop.	%	Pop.	%	Pop.	%	Pop.	%	Pop.	%	Pop.	%	Pop.	%
Islam	516,745	87.68%	542,645	89.1%	526,725	88.67%	452,260	88.41%	422,979	88.66%	482,097	89.1%	563,033	89.42%
Hinduism	60,949	10.34%	50,810	8.34%	51,801	8.72%	34,261	6.7%	34,837	7.3%	36,068	6.67%	40,888	6.49%
Sikhism	11,188	1.9%	15,169	2.49%	15,070	2.54%	24,436	4.78%	18,626	3.9%	22,030	4.07%	24,680	3.92%
Christianity	416	0.07%	253	0.04%	271	0.05%	450	0.09%	430	0.09%	672	0.12%	893	0.14%
Jainism	58	0.01%	169	0.03%	151	0.03%	163	0.03%	195	0.04%	209	0.04%	159	0.03%
Zoroastrianism	16	0%	9	0%	0	0%	4	0%	1	0%	0	0%	3	0%
Buddhism	0	0%	0	0%	0	0%	0	0%	0	0%	0	0%	2	0%
Judaism	—N/a	—N/a	1	0%	0	0%	1	0%	0	0%	0	0%	0	0%
Others	1	0%	0	0%	0	0%	0	0%	0	0%	0	0%	0	0%
Total population	589,373	100%	609,056	100%	594,018	100%	511,575	100%	477,068	100%	541,076	100%	629,658	100%
Note: British Punjab province era district borders are not an exact match in the present-day due to various bifurcations to district borders — which since created new districts — throughout the historic Punjab Province region during the post-independence era that have taken into account population increases.

Religion in the Tehsils of Jhelum District (1921)
Tehsil	Islam		Hinduism		Sikhism		Christianity		Jainism		Others (Note: Including Buddhism, Zoroastrianism, Judaism, Tribals, others, or not stated)		Total	
Tehsil	Pop.	%	Pop.	%	Pop.	%	Pop.	%	Pop.	%	Pop.	%	Pop.	%
Jhelum Tehsil	155,510	89.83%	11,467	6.62%	5,624	3.25%	362	0.21%	158	0.09%	1	0%	173,122	100%
Pind Dadan Khan Tehsil	127,359	88.85%	13,827	9.65%	2,052	1.43%	63	0.04%	37	0.03%	0	0%	143,338	100%
Chakwal Tehsil	140,110	87.24%	9,543	5.94%	10,950	6.82%	5	0%	0	0%	0	0%	160,608	100%
Note: British Punjab province era tehsil borders are not an exact match in the present-day due to various bifurcations to tehsil borders — which since created new tehsils — throughout the historic Punjab Province region during the post-independence era that have taken into account population increases.

Religion in the Tehsils of Jhelum District (1941)
Tehsil	Islam		Hinduism		Sikhism		Christianity		Jainism		Others (Note: Including Anglo-Indian Christians, British Christians, Buddhism, Zoroastrianism, Judaism, Tribals, others, or not stated)		Total	
Tehsil	Pop.	%	Pop.	%	Pop.	%	Pop.	%	Pop.	%	Pop.	%	Pop.	%
Jhelum Tehsil	200,269	88.91%	15,341	6.81%	8,720	3.87%	639	0.28%	147	0.07%	125	0.06%	225,241	100%
Pind Dadan Khan Tehsil	174,864	90.71%	15,411	7.99%	2,395	1.24%	51	0.03%	12	0.01%	37	0.02%	192,770	100%
Chakwal Tehsil	187,900	88.78%	10,136	4.79%	13,565	6.41%	40	0.02%	0	0%	6	0%	211,647	100%
Note1: British Punjab province era tehsil borders are not an exact match in the present-day due to various bifurcations to tehsil borders — which since created new tehsils — throughout the historic Punjab Province region during the post-independence era that have taken into account population increases. Note2: Tehsil religious breakdown figures for Christianity only includes local Christians, labeled as "Indian Christians" on census. Does not include Anglo-Indian Christians or British Christians, who were classified under "Other" category.

=== Language ===
Languages of Jhelum district (2023)
1. Punjabi (88.8%)
2. Urdu (4.24%)
3. Pashto (2.73%)
4. Others (4.21%)

At the time of the 2023 Census of Pakistan, 88.82% of the population spoke Punjabi, 2.73% Pashto and 4.24% Urdu as their first language. The dialects of Punjabi spoken here are Potohari and Majhi.

== Development organizations ==
Rehmat Welfare Foundation Jhelum is a charity project working for poor and needy people of fifty-mile area including Jhelum which cannot afford the expenses of their daily life and very expensive general medical and kidney dialysis treatment.

Civil Society Human and Institutional Development Program (CHIP) is working in Sohawa Tehsil since 2004, with its field office in the area CHIP has successfully mobilized community people to get organize into Community Based Organizations, Community Citizen Boards and Women Organizations. Further, CHIP has duly built the capacity of these local entities to take new initiatives. These community-level organizations, in collaborative partnerships with CHIP, are working on several development projects. The main focus of these projects is to eliminate illiteracy from villages of Sohawa especially those where government education structure does not exist, make clean drinking water available, provide technical support to the local farmers, raise skill development opportunities for women, and include them in the decision-making process, aiding social inclusion, so as to better represent the communities they live in. The local community-level organizations developed by CHIP are making successful efforts in implementing development projects by deriving funds from local government bodies.

== Universities, colleges and schools ==
- AIOU – Jhelum campus
- Air Foundation School System Junior Branch (Near Al-Bilal Hotel)
- Air Foundation School System, Jhelum (Boys & Girls)
- Al Islam Sharia College Ketchehry Road Jhelum
- Army Public School and College, Jhelum Cantt.
- Army Public School and College, Mangla Cantt
- Bahria Foundation College, GT Road, Jhelum
- Beaconhouse School System, G T Road, Jhelum
- Bukhari College of Science and Comm Jhelum
- Cambridge College, 10-A Civil Lines, Jhelum
- Cantonment Board CMB Model, Jhelum
- Dar-e-Arqam School Muhammadi Chowk, Jhelum
- Etekosoft Institute of Computer Sciences, Jhelum
- Farabi Foundation Elementary School for Boys Mangla Road Dina Jhelum.
- Farabi Foundation Elementary School for Girls Kalwantpur Dina Jhelum.
- Farabi Foundation High School for Boys Dina Jhelum.
- Farabi Foundation High School for Girls Dina Jhelum.
- Fatima Jinnah Post Graduate Girls College, Jhelum Cantt
- Fauji Foundation Degree College, PD Khan
- Fauji Foundation Model School & College, Jhelum Cantt.
- Federal Government College, Mangla Cantt
- Global College of English Language, Bilal Town Jhelum
- Government Al Bairuni Degree College, Pind Dadan Khan
- Government College for Women, Jhelum
- Government College of Commerce, Bilal Town, Jhelum
- Government College of Education, Jhelum
- Government College of Technology, Chak Daulat
- Government College of technology, Chak Daulat, Jhelum
- Government College. G.T. Road, Jhelum
- Government Degree College for Women, Sanghoi
- Government Degree College, Dina
- Government Degree College, Jhelum
- Government Degree College, Sohawa
- Government Girls College, Jalalpur Sharif
- Government Institute of Commerce (W), Sohawa
- Government Institute of Commerce, Pind Dadan Khan
- Government Model High School Madu Kalas
- Government Model High School Ratwal, Pind Dadan Khan
- Government Model High School, Bair Faqiran
- Government Noor Mudrassa Tul Banat Girls School, established since 1944
- Government Post Graduate College, Jhelum
- Government Tabligh ul Islam secondary school, Jhelum
- International Islamic University Islamabad Schools, Jhelum
- Jhelum College of Education, Jhelum
- Jhelum Homeopathic Medical College, GT Road, Jada
- Jinnah College of Commerce & Computer Science, Jhelum
- Jinnah College of Commerce, Dina
- Jinnah Law College, Jhelum
- Litra Valley Girls College, Jango
- Lyceumhouse School System Karimpur Road, Jhelum.
- PICS, Bilal town
- Presentation Convent School, Jhelum
- Punjab College, PD Khan
- Punjab College, G.T Road, Jhelum
- QMA Jinnah College, PD Khan
- Research Girls College, Kala Gujran
- SLS College Jhelum
- Superior College, Jhelum
- The Educator School, G.T Road, Jada
- University of the Punjab, Jhelum campus
- VU Jhelum Campus
- Wings College of Commerce, 4-Civil Lines, Jhelum
- World Over School and College Academy, Jhelum

== Notable people ==
- Maj. Muhammad Akram, Nishan-e-Haider
- Jagjit Singh Aurora, Commander Eastern Theatre, Indian Army in Indo-Pak War of 1971
- Fawad Chaudhry, Pakistani politician
- Sunil Dutt, Indian actor and politician
- Inder Kumar Gujral, ex-Prime Minister of India
- Gulzar, Indian filmmaker, lyricist and poet
- Chaudhry Altaf Hussain, ex-governor Punjab
- Dr. Ghulam Hussain
- Zamir Jafri, poet
- Asif Nawaz Janjua, general and ex-chief of the Army Staff, Pakistan
- Ghazanfar Ali Khan, leader of the Pakistan Movement
- Muhammad Ali Mirza, Islamic Scholar
- Jaswant Singh Neki, a leading Indian scholar, significant Punjabi language poet and an influential psychiatrist
- Porus – king, ancient warrior

== See also ==
=== Villages in Jhelum District ===
- Chak Jamal
- Chak Khasa
- Dhanyala
- Dhok Masyal
- Gharmala
- Noor Pur Baghan
- Shamaspur
- Thallah Chaudrian
