= Khanewal–Wazirabad Branch Line =

Railway line in Pakistan

Overview
- Native name: خانیوال-وزیرآباد فرعی ریلوے خط
- Owner: Pakistan Railways
- Termini: Khanewal Junction; Wazirabad Junction
- Stations: 30

Service
- Operator: Pakistan Railways

History
- Opened: 17 December 1899

Technical
- Line length: 325 km (202 mi)
- Operating speed: 65 km/h (40 mph) to 105 km/h (65 mph)

Khanewal–Wazirabad Branch Line (Urdu: خانیوال-وزیرآباد فرعی ریلوے خط) is one of several branch lines in Pakistan, operated and maintained by Pakistan Railways. The line begins at Khanewal Junction station and ends at Wazirabad Junction station. There are 30 railway stations between these two junctions, across a total length of 325 kilometers (202 mi) of railway line. The line is important as it connects Faisalabad with other parts of the country by rail. The Khanewal–Wazirabad Branch Line was originally named the Wazirabad–Multan Railway under the North Western State Railway. A survey for a railway line began in 1892. The Wazirabad–Lyallpur began construction in 1894 and opened in 1896. The Lyallpur–Multan section began construction the following year and opened in 1899.

== Stations ==
The railway stations on this railway line are:

- Khanewal Junction
- Mian Shamir
- Makhdumpur Pahoran
- Jan Muhammad Wala
- Abdul Hakim
- Mouza Daultana
- Darkhana
- Jarala
- Shorkot Cantonment Junction
- Sattar Wala Halt
- Chutiana
- Alisar Halt
- Dabanawala
- Toba Tek Singh
- Seowal
- Janiwala
- Noorpur Halt
- Gojra
- Kot Salim Shahid
- Kot Abadan Halt
- Pakka Anna
- Sar Shamir Road
- Abbaspur
- Risalewala
- Samanabad
- Faisalabad
- Nishatabad
- Faisalabad Dry Port
- Sultan Nagar
- Chak Jhumra Junction
- Sahianwala
- Dar Ul Ihsan
- Sangla Hill Junction
- Marh Balochan
- Rattan Halt
- Sukheke
- Nautheh
- Kaleke
- Madharian Wala
- Hafizabad
- Shori Chatta
- Gajar Gola
- Alipur Chatta
- Mancher Chatta
- Jamke Chatta
- Dharowal Kang Halt
- Mansurwali
- Wadala Cheema Halt
- Wazirabad Junction
