= Lodhran–Khanewal Chord Line =

Pakistani rail line

Lodhran–Khanewal Chord Line لودھراں-خانیوال ریلوے

Overview
- Other name: Chord line
- Status: Operational
- Owner: Pakistan Railways
- Locale: Lodhran District, Khanewal District
- Termini: Lodhran Junction; Khanewal Junction
- Stations: 9

Service
- Operator: Pakistan Railways

Technical
- Line length: 91 km (57 mi)
- Track gauge: 1,676 mm (5 ft 6 in)
- Operating speed: 105 km/h (65 mph) (Current); 160 km/h (99 mph) (Proposed Upgrade)

Lodhran–Khanewal Chord Line (Urdu: لودھراں-خانیوال ریلوے) is a Pakistani railway line that is part of Main Line 1. It is operated and maintained by Pakistan Railways, the national railway company. The line begins from Lodhran Junction station and ends at Khanewal Junction station. The total length of this railway line is 91 kilometers (57 mi). There are 9 railway stations from Lodhran Junction to Khanewal Junction. The line is often referred to as the chord line, as it allows trains which traveling on the Karachi–Peshawar Railway Line to bypass Multan.

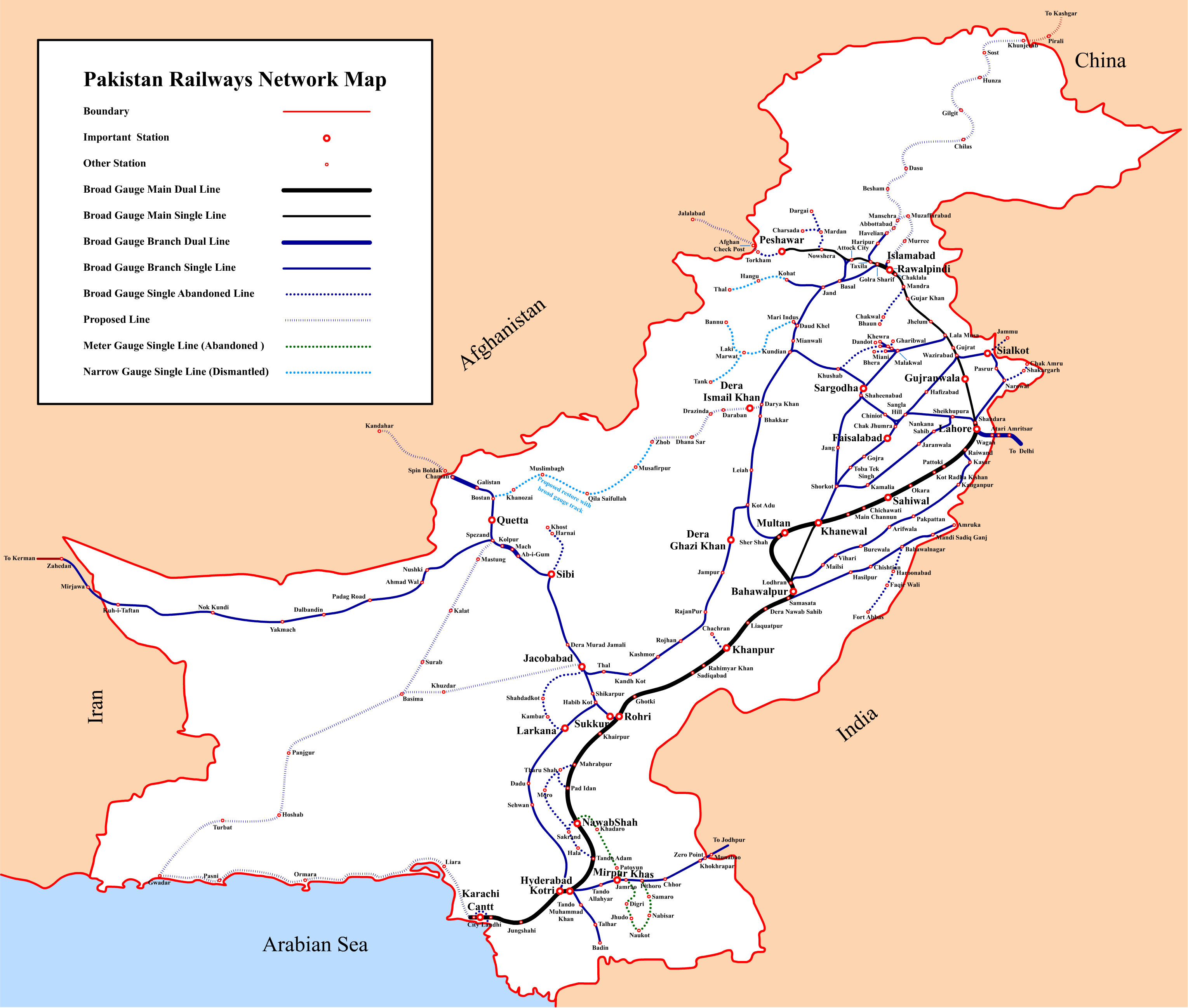
Pakistan Railways network map

== Stations ==
- Lodhran Junction
- Shahidanwala
- Rukanpur
- Sirajwala (Abandoned)
- Dunyapur
- Jafarwala Halt (Abandoned)
- Kutabpur
- Sukh Beas (Abandoned)
- Jahania
- Parvezwala (Abandoned)
- Jangal Mariala
- Mehar Shah
- Khanewal Junction

== See also ==
- Karachi–Peshawar Railway Line
- Railway Lines in Pakistan
