= Daira Mahram railway station =

Railway station in Punjab, Pakistan

Daira Mahram Station ڈیرا محرم ریلوے اسٹیشن

General information
- Owner: Ministry of Railways
- Line: Khanewal–Wazirabad Branch Line

Other information
- Station code: DRMM

Daira Mahram railway station (Urdu: ڈیرا محرم ریلوے اسٹیشن) is a disused railway station located in Daira Mahram village, Punjab, Pakistan. The station is located between Abdul Hakim railway station and Darkhana railway station.

== See also ==
- List of railway stations in Pakistan
- Pakistan Railways
