= Khanewal (disambiguation) =

Khanewal is a city in Punjab, Pakistan.

Khanewal may also refer to:

- Khanewal District, district of South Punjab.
- Khanewal Tehsil, tehsil of Khanewal district

== Railway stations ==
- Khanewal Junction railway station
- Khanewal-Wazirabad Branch Line

== See also ==
- Khanowal, village in India
