= Faisalabad Dry Port railway station =

Railway station in Faisalabad, Pakistan

Faisalabad Dry Port Station فیصل آباد ڈرائی پورٹ اسٹیشن

General information
- Coordinates: 31.491°N 73.143°E
- Owner: Ministry of Railways
- Line: Khanewal–Wazirabad Branch Line

Other information
- Station code: FDP

Services
Preceding station	Pakistan Railways	Following station
Nishatabad towards Khanewal Junction	Khanewal–Wazirabad Branch Line	Chak Jhumra Junction towards Wazirabad Junction
Location

Faisalabad Dry Port Railway Station (Urdu: فیصل آباد خشک بندرگاہ ریلوے اسٹیشن) is located 10 kilometers (6.2 mi) away from Faisalabad city in Faisalabad district of Punjab province of the Pakistan.

Faisalabad Dry Port railway station is primarily a cargo station as most of the export products from Faisalabad to Karachi sea port move through this station. Also major imports from Karachi are also handled here. The facilities at the railway station include large cargo storage, cargo movement, cargo docking & un-docking and cold storage.

Faisalabad Dry Port railway station is also used for passengers on one platform only.

== See also ==
- List of railway stations in Pakistan
- Pakistan Railways
- Gatti railway station
