= Amirpur Halt railway station =

Railway station in Punjab, Pakistan

Coordinates: 29.675237°N 71.973363°E

Amirpur Halt Railway Station امیر پور ہالٹ ریلوے اسٹیشن

General information
- Owner: Ministry of Railways
- Line: Khanewal–Wazirabad Branch Line

Other information
- Station code: AMRR

Services
Preceding station	Pakistan Railways	Following station
Janiwala towards Khanewal Junction	Khanewal–Wazirabad Branch Line	Gojra towards Wazirabad Junction
Location

Amirpur Halt Railway Station (Urdu: امیر پور ہالٹ ریلوے اسٹیشن) is located in Pakistan.

== See also ==
- List of railway stations in Pakistan
- Pakistan Railways
