= Chak 285 JB =

- Village
- Interactive map of Chak 285 JB
- Coordinates: 31°03′52″N 72°37′52″E
- Country: Pakistan
- Province: Punjab
- District: Toba Tek Singh District
- Tehsil: Toba Tek Singh
- Time zone: UTC+5 (PST)
- Postal Code: 36101

Chak 285 JB (Jhang Branch) is a village of Toba Tek Singh District in the Punjab province of Pakistan. Its postal code is 36101.

It is located at 31°03′52″N 72°37′52″E with an altitude of 162 metres (534 feet). Neighbouring settlements include Randian and Bilasur. It is located at Gojra - Toba Tek Singh Road.
