= DYR =

DYR may refer to:

- Askold and Dir, a semi-legendary 9th-century ruler of Kiev
- Dunyapur railway station, Punjab, Pakistan (station code DYR)
- DYR, the IATA code for Ugolny Airport in Siberia
- DYR 105.1 FM
