= Sar Shamir Road railway station =

Railway station in Punjab, Pakistan

Sar Shamir Road Station سر شمیر روڈ ریلوے اسٹیشن

General information
- Coordinates: 31.2892°N 72.8713°E
- Owner: Ministry of Railways

Other information
- Station code: SSX

Services
Preceding station	Pakistan Railways	Following station
Pakka Anna towards Khanewal Junction	Khanewal–Wazirabad Branch Line	Abbaspur towards Wazirabad Junction
Location

Sar Shamir Road Railway Station (Urdu: سر شمیر روڈ ریلوے اسٹیشن) is a station on Sar Shamir road, Faisalabad district of Punjab, Pakistan.

== See also ==
- List of railway stations in Pakistan
- Pakistan Railways
