= Risalewala railway station =

Railway station in Punjab, Pakistan

Risalewala Railway Station رسالیوالہ ریلوے اسٹیشن

General information
- Coordinates: 31.3673°N 73.0191°E
- Owner: Ministry of Railways
- Line: Khanewal–Wazirabad Branch Line

Other information
- Station code: RSE

Services
Preceding station	Pakistan Railways	Following station
Abbaspur towards Khanewal Junction	Khanewal–Wazirabad Branch Line	Samanabad towards Wazirabad Junction
Location

Risalewala Railway Station (Urdu: رسالیوالہ ریلوے اسٹیشن) is located in Risalewala village, Faisalabad district of Punjab province of Pakistan. This railway station serves as the railway station for Faisalabad International Airport, as the airport is located in the Risalewala village area.

== See also ==
- List of railway stations in Pakistan
- Pakistan Railways
