= Kot Abadan Halt railway station =

Railway station in Punjab, Pakistan

Kot Abadan Halt Station کوٹ ابادان ہالٹ اسٹیشن

General information
- Owner: Ministry of Railways
- Line: Khanewal–Wazirabad Branch Line

Other information
- Station code: KABN

Services
Preceding station	Pakistan Railways	Following station
Gojra towards Khanewal Junction	Khanewal–Wazirabad Branch Line	Pakka Anna towards Wazirabad Junction
Location

Kot Abadan Halt Railway Station (Urdu: کوٹ ابادان ہالٹ ریلوے اسٹیشن) is located in Kot Abadan village, Toba Tek Singh district of Punjab province of the Pakistan.

== See also ==
- List of railway stations in Pakistan
- Pakistan Railways
