= Sukheke railway station =

Railway station in Punjab, Pakistan

Sukheke Railway Station سکھیکی ریلوے اسٹیشن

General information
- Owner: Ministry of Railways

Other information
- Station code: SKE

Services
Preceding station	Pakistan Railways	Following station
Rattan Halt towards Khanewal Junction	Khanewal–Wazirabad Branch Line	Nautheh towards Wazirabad Junction
Location

Sukheke Railway Station (Urdu: سکھیکی ریلوے اسٹیشن) is located in Sukheke village, Hafizabad district of Punjab province, Pakistan.

== See also ==
- List of railway stations in Pakistan
- Pakistan Railways
