= Abbaspur railway station =

Railway Station in Punjab, Pakistan

Abbaspur Railway Station عباس پور ریلوے اسٹیشن

General information
- Coordinates: 31.3288°N 72.9457°E
- Owner: Ministry of Railways
- Line: Khanewal–Wazirabad Branch Line

Other information
- Station code: AHR

Services
Preceding station	Pakistan Railways	Following station
Sar Shamir Road towards Khanewal Junction	Khanewal–Wazirabad Branch Line	Risalewala towards Wazirabad Junction
Location

Abbaspur Railway Station (Urdu: عباس پور ریلوے اسٹیشن) is located in Pakistan.

== See also ==
- List of railway stations in Pakistan
- Pakistan Railways
