= Nishatabad railway station =

Railway station in Punjab, Pakistan

Nishatabad Railway Station نشاط آباد ریلوے اسٹیشن

General information
- Coordinates: 31.4498°N 73.1195°E
- Owner: Ministry of Railways
- Line: Khanewal–Wazirabad Branch Line

Other information
- Station code: NSTD

Services
Preceding station	Pakistan Railways	Following station
Faisalabad towards Khanewal Junction	Khanewal–Wazirabad Branch Line	Faisalabad Dry Port towards Wazirabad Junction
Location

Nishatabad Railway Station (Urdu: نشاط آباد ریلوے اسٹیشن) is located in Nishatabad town, Faisalabad district of Punjab province, Pakistan.

Nishatabad railway station serves the locals of Mansoorabad, Nishatabad, Gulistan colony and adjoining areas. A branch line also goes to GENCO III, combined cycle power station of Faisalabad to supply liquid fuel to the plant.

== See also ==
- List of railway stations in Pakistan
- Pakistan Railways
