= Makhdumpur Pahoran railway station =

Railway station in Punjab, Pakistan

Makhdumpur Pahoran Station مخدوم پور پہوڑاں ریلوے اسٹیشن

General information
- Coordinates: 30.4396°N 72.0459°E
- Owner: Ministry of Railways
- Line: Khanewal–Wazirabad Branch Line

Other information
- Station code: MDO

Services
Preceding station	Pakistan Railways	Following station
Mian Shamir towards Khanewal Junction	Khanewal–Wazirabad Branch Line	Jan Muhammad Wala towards Wazirabad Junction
Location

Makhdumpur Pahoran Railway Station (Urdu and Punjabi: مخدوم پور پہوڑاں ریلوے اسٹیشن) is located in Makhdumpur Pahoran village, Khanewal district of Punjab province, Pakistan.

== See also ==
- List of railway stations in Pakistan
- Pakistan Railways
