= Mancher Chattha railway station =

Railway station in Punjab, Pakistan

Mancher Chattha Railway Station منچھر چٹھہ ریلوے اسٹیشن

General information
- Owner: Ministry of Railways
- Line: Khanewal–Wazirabad Branch Line

Other information
- Station code: MNCH

Services
Preceding station	Pakistan Railways	Following station
Alipur Chattha towards Khanewal Junction	Khanewal–Wazirabad Branch Line	Jamke Chattha towards Wazirabad Junction
Location

Mancher Chattha Railway Station (Urdu: منچھر چٹھہ ریلوے اسٹیشن) is located in Mancher Chattha village, Gujranwala District of Punjab province, Pakistan.

== See also ==
- List of railway stations in Pakistan
- Pakistan Railways
