= Abdul Hakim railway station =

Railway station in Pakistan

Abdul Hakim station عبدالحکیم اسٹیشن

General information
- Coordinates: 30.5545°N 72.1319°E
- Owner: Ministry of Railways
- Line: Khanewal–Wazirabad Branch Line

Other information
- Station code: XG
- Website: www.railpk.com

Services
Preceding station	Pakistan Railways	Following station
Jan Muhammad Wala towards Khanewal Junction	Khanewal–Wazirabad Branch Line	Darkhana towards Wazirabad Junction
Location

Abdul Hakim railway station (Urdu and Punjabi: عبدالحکیم ریلوے اسٹیشن) is located in Abdul Hakim city, Khanewal district of Punjab province Pakistan.

== See also ==
- List of railway stations in Pakistan
- Pakistan Railways
