= Chak 288 JB =

Chak 288 JB UsmanKot (DharmKot)
- Village
- Interactive map of Chak 288 JB
- Country: Pakistan
- Province: Punjab
- District: Toba Tek Singh District
- Tehsil: Toba Tek Singh
- Time zone: UTC+5 (PST)

Chak 288 JB, also known as Jaimal Singh, is a village of Toba Tek Singh District in the Punjab province of Pakistan. Their postal code is 36101.

It is located at 31°3′0″N 72°33′0″E with an altitude of 162 metres (534 feet). Neighbouring settlements include Randian and Bilasur. It is located at Gojra - Toba Tek Singh Road.
