= Jahanian railway station =

Railway station in Punjab, Pakistan

Jahanian Station جہانیاں ریلوے اسٹیشن

General information
- Coordinates: 30.0423°N 71.8130°E
- Owner: Ministry of Railways
- Line: Lodhran-Khanewal Branch Line
- Platforms: 2
- Tracks: 3

Other information
- Station code: JAI

History
- Opened: 1870

Services
Preceding station	Pakistan Railways	Following station
Kutabpur towards Lodhran Junction	Lodhran–Khanewal Chord Line	Jangal Mariala towards Khanewal Junction
Location

Jahanian railway station (Urdu and Punjabi: جہانیاں ریلوے اسٹیشن) is located in Jahanian town, Khanewal district of Punjab province of the Pakistan. The railway station has stoppage of two trains i.e Allama Iqbal Express and Millat Express.

== See also ==
- List of railway stations in Pakistan
- Pakistan Railways
