= Chutiana railway station =

Railway station in Punjab, Pakistan

Chutiana Railway Station چٹیانا ریلوے سٹیشن

General information
- Coordinates: 30.8683°N 72.3522°E
- Owner: Ministry of Railways
- Line: Khanewal–Wazirabad Branch Line

Other information
- Station code: CUN

Services
Preceding station	Pakistan Railways	Following station
Shorkot Cantonment Junction towards Khanewal Junction	Khanewal–Wazirabad Branch Line	Dabanwala towards Wazirabad Junction
Location

Chutiana Railway Station (Urdu, Punjabi: چٹیانا ریلوے سٹیشن) is located in Chutiana village, Toba Tek Singh district of Punjab province of the Pakistan.

== See also ==
- List of railway stations in Pakistan
- Pakistan Railways
