= Duniyapur =

Duniyapur or Dunyapur may refer to:

- Dunyapur, Lodhran district of Punjab, Pakistan
  - Dunyapur railway station
- Dunyapur Tehsil, a tehsil of the Lodhran district of Punjab, Pakistan
- Duniyapur (TV series), a 2024 Urdu-language Pakistani television drama series
