= Shahidanwala railway station =

Railway station in Punjab, Pakistan

Shahidanwala Station شہیدانوالا ریلوے اسٹیشن

General information
- Coordinates: 29.6123°N 71.6435°E
- Owner: Ministry of Railways
- Line: Lodhran-Khanewal Branch Line

Other information
- Station code: SHY

Services
Preceding station	Pakistan Railways	Following station
Lodhran Junction Terminus	Lodhran–Khanewal Chord Line	Rukanpur towards Khanewal Junction
Location

Shahidanwala railway station (Urdu and Punjabi: شہیدانوالا ریلوے اسٹیشن) is located in Shahidanwala village, Lodhran district of Punjab province of the Pakistan.

== See also ==
- List of railway stations in Pakistan
- Pakistan Railways
