= Rattan Halt railway station =

Railway station in Punjab, Pakistan

Rattan Halt Railway Station رتن ہالٹ ریلوے اسٹیشن

General information
- Owner: Ministry of Railways
- Line: Khanewal–Wazirabad Branch Line

Other information
- Station code: RTN

Services
Preceding station	Pakistan Railways	Following station
Marh Balochan towards Khanewal Junction	Khanewal–Wazirabad Branch Line	Sukheke towards Wazirabad Junction
Location

Rattan Halt Railway Station (Urdu: رتن ہالٹ ریلوے اسٹیشن)is located in Rattan village, Nankana Sahib district of Punjab province, Pakistan.

== See also ==
- List of railway stations in Pakistan
- Pakistan Railways
