= Randian (disambiguation) =

Randian may refer to:

- Randian, Pakistan, settlement in Punjab, Pakistan
- Prince Randian (ca. 1871 – 1934), a limbless sideshow performer
- An advocate of the ideas of philosopher Ayn Rand
- Randian hero, a character archetype in the fiction of Ayn Rand
