= Jamke Chattha railway station =

Railway station in Pakistan

Jamke Chattha Railway Station جمکے چٹھہ ریلوے اسٹیشن

General information
- Owner: Ministry of Railways
- Line: Khanewal–Wazirabad Branch Line

Other information
- Station code: JCT

Services
Preceding station	Pakistan Railways	Following station
Mancher Chattha towards Khanewal Junction	Khanewal–Wazirabad Branch Line	Mansurwali towards Wazirabad Junction
Location

Jamke Chattha Railway Station (Urdu: جمکے چٹھہ ریلوے اسٹیشن) is located in Jamke Chattha village, Gujranwala District, of Punjab province in Pakistan.

== See also ==
- List of railway stations in Pakistan
- Pakistan Railways
