= Kutabpur railway station =

Railway station in Punjab, Pakistan

Kutabpur Railway Station قُطب پُور ریلوے اسٹیشن
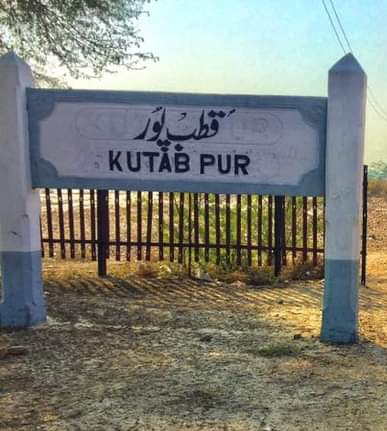

General information
- Coordinates: 29.902°N 71.759°E
- Owner: Ministry of Railways
- Line: Lodhran-Khanewal Branch Line

Other information
- Station code: KUZ

Services
Preceding station	Pakistan Railways	Following station
Dunyapur towards Lodhran Junction	Lodhran–Khanewal Chord Line	Jahania towards Khanewal Junction
Location

Kutabpur Railway Station (Urdu and Punjabi: قُطب پُور ریلوے اسٹیشن) is located in Qutabpur city, Lodhran district of Punjab province of the Pakistan.

== See also ==
- List of railway stations in Pakistan
- Pakistan Railways
