= JRF =

JRF may refer to:

== Academia ==
- Jackie Robinson Foundation, in the United States
- Junior Research Fellowship, in India
- Junior Research Fellowships, at Oxford and Cambridge

== Non-profit organisations ==
- Jackie Robinson Foundation, United States (formed 1973)
- Jewish Reconstructionist Federation, North America (formed 1955)
- Jordan River Foundation, Jordan (formed 1995)
- Joseph Rowntree Foundation, United Kingdom (formed 1904)

== Transport ==
- James River Freeway, a road in Missouri, United States
- Japan Freight Railway Company
- Jarala railway station, Pakistan
- Kalaeloa Airport, O'ahu, Hawaii, United States
  - Naval Air Station Barbers Point, its precursor
