= JMW =

JMW may refer to:

- Jan Muhammad Wala railway station, in Pakistan
- Mouwase language, variety of a Papuan language of Papua New Guinea
