= Pakka Anna railway station =

Railway Station in Punjab, Pakistan

Pakka Anna Railway Station پکا آنا ریلوے اسٹیشن

General information
- Coordinates: 31.2456°N 72.7981°E
- Owner: Ministry of Railways
- Line: Khanewal–Wazirabad Branch Line

Other information
- Station code: PCA

Services
| Preceding station | Pakistan Railways | Following station |
|---|---|---|
| Kot Abadan Halt towards Khanewal Junction | Khanewal–Wazirabad Branch Line | Sar Shamir Road towards Wazirabad Junction |
Location

Pakka Anna Railway Station (Urdu: پکا آنا ریلوے اسٹیشن) is located in Pakka Anna village, Toba Tek Singh district of Punjab province of the Pakistan.

== See also ==
- List of railway stations in Pakistan
- Pakistan Railways
