= Rukanpur railway station =

Railway station in Punjab, Pakistan

Coordinates: 29.678783°N 71.670043°E

Rukanpur Station رکن پور ریلوے اسٹیشن

General information
- Owner: Ministry of Railways
- Line: Lodhran-Khanewal Branch Line

Other information
- Station code: RKU

Services
Preceding station	Pakistan Railways	Following station
Shahidanwala towards Lodhran Junction	Lodhran–Khanewal Chord Line	Dunyapur towards Khanewal Junction
Location

Rukanpur Railway Station (Urdu and Punjabi: رکن پور ریلوے اسٹیشن) is located in Rukanpur Village, Lodhran District of the province of Punjab in Pakistan.

== See also ==
- List of railway stations in Pakistan
- Pakistan Railways
