= Marh Balochan railway station =

Railway station in Punjab, Pakistan

Marh Balochan Railway Station مڑھ بلوچاں ریلوے اسٹیشن

General information
- Owner: Ministry of Railways
- Line: Khanewal–Wazirabad Branch Line

Other information
- Station code: MBN

Services
Preceding station	Pakistan Railways	Following station
Sangla Hill Junction towards Khanewal Junction	Khanewal–Wazirabad Branch Line	Rattan Halt towards Wazirabad Junction
Location

Marh Balochan Railway Station (Urdu: مڑھ بلوچاں ریلوے اسٹیشن) is located in Marh Balochan village, Nankana Sahib district of Punjab province, Pakistan.

== See also ==
- List of railway stations in Pakistan
- Pakistan Railways
