= Jangal Mariala railway station =

Railway station in Punjab, Pakistan

Jangal Mariala Station جنگل مڑیالہ ریلوے اسٹیشن

General information
- Coordinates: 30.1832°N 71.8683°E
- Owner: Ministry of Railways
- Line: Lodhran-Khanewal Branch Line

Other information
- Station code: JMY

Services
Preceding station	Pakistan Railways	Following station
Jahania towards Lodhran Junction	Lodhran–Khanewal Chord Line	Mehar Shah towards Khanewal Junction
Location

Jangal Mariala railway station (Urdu and Punjabi: جنگل مڑیالہ ریلوے اسٹیشن) is located in Jangal Mariala village, Khanewal district of Punjab province of the Pakistan.

== See also ==
- List of railway stations in Pakistan
- Pakistan Railways
