= Samanabad railway station =

Railway station in Punjab, Pakistan

Coordinates: 31.390425°N 73.063066°E

Samanabad Railway Station سمن آباد ریلوے اسٹیشن

General information
- Owner: Ministry of Railways
- Line: Khanewal–Wazirabad Branch Line

Other information
- Station code: SMBD

Services
Preceding station	Pakistan Railways	Following station
Risalewala towards Khanewal Junction	Khanewal–Wazirabad Branch Line	Faisalabad towards Wazirabad Junction
Location

Samanabad Railway Station (Urdu: سمن آباد ریلوے اسٹیشن) is located in Samanabad area in Faisalabad city, Faisalabad district of Punjab province of the Pakistan.

The station serves the areas of Samanabad, D type, Nisar colony and Novelty in Faisalabad city. Famous Government Science College Faisalabad lies in front of Samanabad Railway station.

== See also ==
- List of railway stations in Pakistan
- Pakistan Railways
