= Gojra railway station =

Railway station in Punjab, Pakistan

Gojra Railway Station گوجرہ ریلوے اسٹیشن

General information
- Coordinates: 31.1427°N 72.6838°E
- Owner: Ministry of Railways
- Line: Khanewal–Wazirabad Branch Line

Other information
- Station code: GJA

Services
Preceding station	Pakistan Railways	Following station
Amirpur Halt towards Khanewal Junction	Khanewal–Wazirabad Branch Line	Kot Abadan Halt towards Wazirabad Junction
Location

Gojra Railway Station (Urdu: گوجرہ ریلوے اسٹیشن) is located in Gojra city, Toba Tek Singh district of Punjab province of the Pakistan.

== See also ==
- List of railway stations in Pakistan
- Pakistan Railways
