= Chak 358 JB Dulham Shareef =

Coordinates: 31°11′41″N 72°34′23″E

Chak 358JB Dulham Shareef is a village located in Gojra tehsil, Toba Tek Singh District within Punjab province of Pakistan.
