= Kot Abbas Shaheed railway station =

Railway station in Punjab, Pakistan

Kot Abbas Shaheed Station کوٹ عباس شہید اسٹیشن

General information
- Coordinates: 30.2618°N 71.7715°E
- Owner: Ministry of Railways
- Line: Karachi–Peshawar Railway Line

Other information
- Status: Closed
- Station code: KJMR

Services
Preceding station	Pakistan Railways	Following station
Riazabad towards Kiamari	Karachi–Peshawar Line	Shamkote towards Peshawar Cantonment
Location

Kot Abbas Shaheed Railway Station (Urdu and Punjabi: کوٹ عباس شہید ریلوے اسٹیشن) is an abandoned railway station located in Kot Abbas Shaheed village, Khanewal district of Punjab province, Pakistan.

== See also ==
- List of railway stations in Pakistan
- Pakistan Railways
