= Rajput Nagar railway station =

Railway station in Punjab, Pakistan

Rajput Nagar Railway Station راجپوت نگر ریلوے اسٹیشن
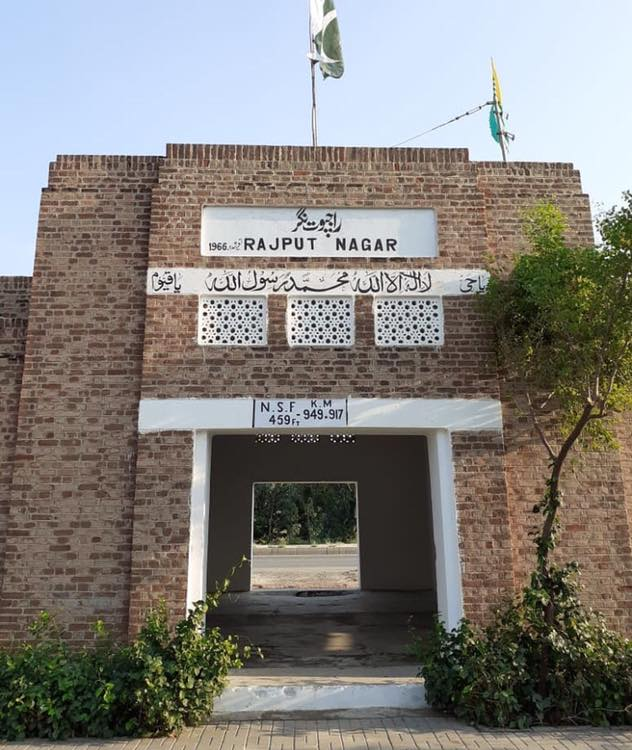

General information
- Coordinates: 30.3549°N 72.0804°E
- Owner: Ministry of Railways
- Line: Karachi–Peshawar Railway Line

Other information
- Station code: RPNG

Services
Preceding station	Pakistan Railways	Following station
Dera Taj towards Kiamari	Karachi–Peshawar Line	Kacha Khuh towards Peshawar Cantonment
Location

Rajput Nagar Railway Station (Urdu and Punjabi: راجپوت نگر ریلوے اسٹیشن) is located in Rajput Nagar village, Khanewal district of Punjab province, Pakistan.

== See also ==
- List of railway stations in Pakistan
- Pakistan Railways
