= Jarala railway station =

Railway station in Punjab, Pakistan

Jarala Station جڑالہ ریلوے اسٹیشن

General information
- Coordinates: 30.7250°N 72.2088°E
- Owner: Ministry of Railways
- Line: Khanewal–Wazirabad Branch Line

Other information
- Station code: JRF

Services
Preceding station	Pakistan Railways	Following station
Darkhana towards Khanewal Junction	Khanewal–Wazirabad Branch Line	Shorkot Cantonment Junction towards Wazirabad Junction
Location

Jarala railway station (Urdu and Punjabi: جڑالہ ریلوے اسٹیشن) is located in Jarala village, Jhang district of Punjab province, Pakistan.

== See also ==
- List of railway stations in Pakistan
- Pakistan Railways
