= Mohsinwal railway station =

Railway station in Punjab, Pakistan

Mohsinwal Railway Station محسن وال ریلوے اسٹیشن

General information
- Coordinates: 30.404°N 72.245°E
- Owner: Ministry of Railways
- Line: Karachi–Peshawar Railway Line

Other information
- Status: closed
- Station code: MOWL

History
- Opened: 1903

Services
Preceding station	Pakistan Railways	Following station
Kacha Khuh towards Kiamari	Karachi–Peshawar Line	Mian Channun towards Peshawar Cantonment
Location

Mohsinwal Railway Station (Urdu and Punjabi: محسن وال ریلوے اسٹیشن) is an abandoned railway station located at Mohsinwal village, Khanewal district of Punjab province of the Pakistan. This railway station was established in 1903.

== See also ==
- List of railway stations in Pakistan
- Pakistan Railways
