= Tatipur railway station =

Railway station in Punjab, Pakistan

Tatypur Railway Station ٹاٹے پور اسٹیشن

General information
- Coordinates: 30.2247°N 71.6499°E
- Owner: Ministry of Railways
- Line: Karachi–Peshawar Railway Line

Other information
- Status: Closed
- Station code: TPR

Services
| Preceding station | Pakistan Railways | Following station |
|---|---|---|
| Piran Ghaib towards Kiamari | Karachi–Peshawar Line | Riazabad towards Peshawar Cantonment |
Location

Tatypur Railway Station (Urdu and Punjabi: ٹاٹے پور ریلوے اسٹیشن) is located in Tatipur village, Multan District of Punjab province, Pakistan.

== See also ==
located at centre of Khanewal & Multan

- List of railway stations in Pakistan
- Pakistan Railways
