= Piran Ghaib railway station =

Railway station in Punjab, Pakistan

Piran Ghaib Railway Station پیراں غائب ریلوے اسٹیشن
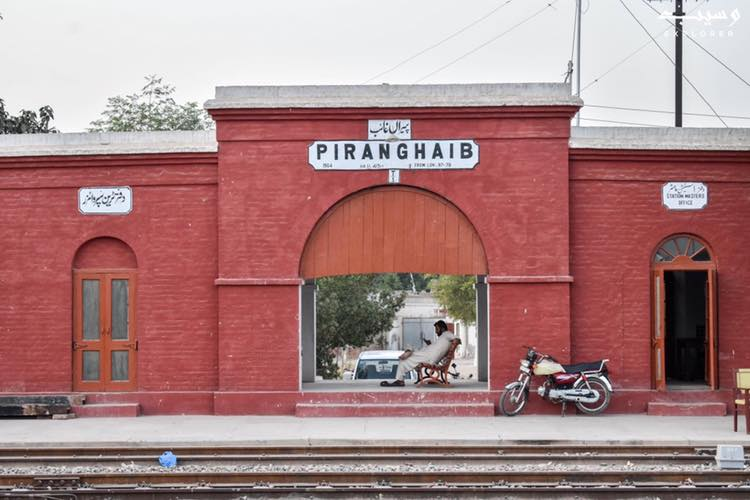

General information
- Coordinates: 30.1966°N 71.5578°E
- Owner: Ministry of Railways
- Line: Karachi–Peshawar Railway Line

Other information
- Station code: PGB

Services
Preceding station	Pakistan Railways	Following station
Multan City towards Kiamari	Karachi–Peshawar Line	Tatipur towards Peshawar Cantonment
Location

Piran Ghaib Railway Station (Urdu and Punjabi: پیراں غائب ریلوے اسٹیشن) is located in Piran Ghaib village, Multan district of Punjab province, Pakistan.

== See also ==
- List of railway stations in Pakistan
- Pakistan Railways
