= Darkhana railway station =

Train station in Punjab, Pakistan

Darkhana Station درکھانا ریلوے اسٹیشن

General information
- Coordinates: 30.6591°N 72.1724°E
- Owner: Ministry of Railways
- Line: Khanewal–Wazirabad Branch Line

Other information
- Station code: DKH

Services
Preceding station	Pakistan Railways	Following station
Jan Muhammad Wala towards Khanewal Junction	Khanewal–Wazirabad Branch Line	Jarala towards Wazirabad Junction
Location

Darkhana railway station (Urdu and Punjabi: درکھانا ریلوے اسٹیشن) is located in Darkhana town, Khanewal district of Punjab province, Pakistan.

== See also ==
- List of railway stations in Pakistan
- Pakistan Railways
