= Dera Taj railway station =

Railway station in Punjab, Pakistan

Dera Taj Railway Station ڈیرہ تاج ریلوے اسٹیشن

General information
- Coordinates: 30.3244°N 71.9792°E
- Owner: Ministry of Railways
- Line: Karachi–Peshawar Railway Line

Other information
- Station code: DRTJ

History
- Opened: 1966

Services
Preceding station	Pakistan Railways	Following station
Khanewal Junction towards Kiamari	Karachi–Peshawar Line	Rajput Nagar towards Peshawar Cantonment
Location

Dera Taj Railway Station (Urdu and Punjabi: ڈیرہ تاج ریلوے اسٹیشن) is located in Dera Taj village, Khanewal district of Punjab province, Pakistan. The station is named after the famous Pakistan Railways contractor, Mian Taj Mohammad. The station was constructed in 1966 and upgraded in the 1970s. Mian Taj Mohammad's construction companies completed multiple, complex national projects for the Pakistan Railways in both West Pakistan and East Pakistan (Bangladesh now)between the decades of the 50's and 70's !

== See also ==
- List of railway stations in Pakistan
- Pakistan Railways
