= Janiwala railway station =

Railway station in Punjab, Pakistan

Janiwala Railway Station جانی والا ریلوے اسٹیشن

General information
- Coordinates: 31.0480°N 72.5816°E
- Owner: Ministry of Railways
- Line: Khanewal–Wazirabad Branch Line

Other information
- Station code: JWA

Services
Preceding station	Pakistan Railways	Following station
Toba Tek Singh towards Khanewal Junction	Khanewal–Wazirabad Branch Line	Amirpur Halt towards Wazirabad Junction
Location

Janiwala Railway Station (Urdu: جانی والا ریلوے اسٹیشن) is located in Janiwala village, Toba Tek Singh district of Punjab province of the Pakistan. This is famous railway station in district Toba Tek Singh, before 1965 there was no highway between Toba and Gojra. The major source of transportation was railways. The villages near janiwala are Chak No 425 JB Purna Whala, Chak No. 288 JB, Chak No. 287 Palasour, Chak No 315 JB Kala Pahar, Chak No. 290 JB, Chak No. 289 JB Chandu Batala, Chak No. 286 JB, Chak No 316 JB Talvandi, Chak No 375 JB. etc.

Few decades ago, Janiwala railway station was the main hub for the passengers who live in close by villages. However, due to extension of Toba Gojra road now the road transportation is faster and convention alternative of traveling for people of those villages. Unfortunately, now Janiwala railway station is just a stop for one or two freight trains in a day.

Moving more towards Gojra, there are villages 285 JB, 373 JB, 301 JB, 299 JB, 298 JB.

== See also ==
- List of railway stations in Pakistan
- Pakistan Railways
