= Mehar Shah railway station =

Railway station in Punjab, Pakistan

Mehar Shah Station مہر شاہ ریلوے اسٹیشن

General information
- Coordinates: 30.2367°N 71.8863°E
- Owner: Ministry of Railways
- Line: Lodhran-Khanewal Branch Line

Other information
- Station code: MEHA

Services
Preceding station	Pakistan Railways	Following station
Jangal Mariala towards Lodhran Junction	Lodhran–Khanewal Chord Line	Khanewal Junction Terminus
Location

Mehar Shah railway station (Urdu: مہر شاہ ریلوے اسٹیشن) is located in Mehar Shah village, Khanewal district of Punjab province of the Pakistan.

== See also ==
- List of railway stations in Pakistan
- Pakistan Railways
