= Multan City railway station =

Railway station in Punjab, Pakistan

Multan City Railway Station ملتان شہر ریلوے اسٹیشن
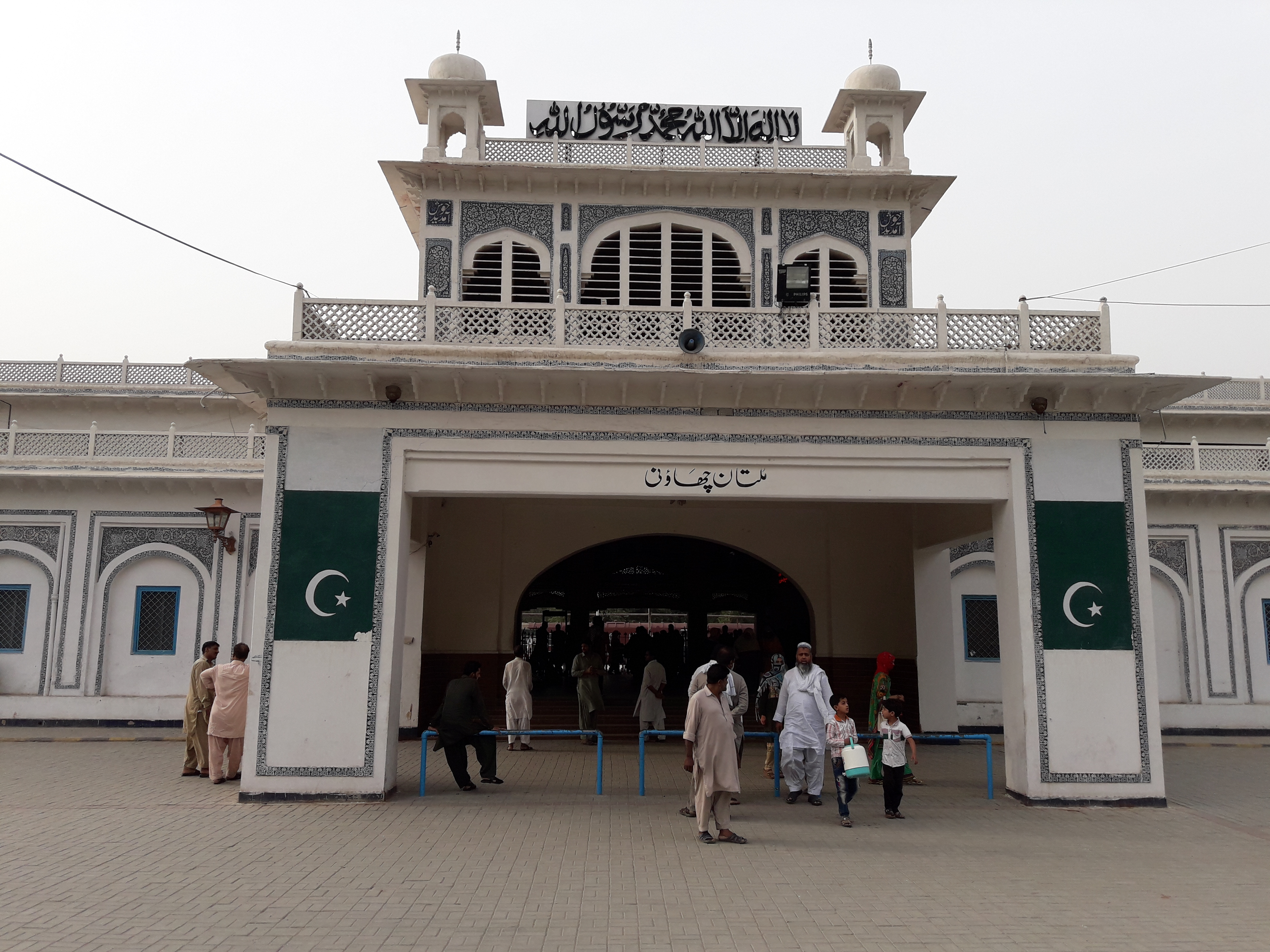

General information
- Coordinates: 30.1828°N 71.4649°E
- Owner: Ministry of Railways
- Line: Karachi–Peshawar Railway Line

Other information
- Station code: MXC

Services
Preceding station	Pakistan Railways	Following station
Multan Cantonment towards Kiamari	Karachi–Peshawar Line	Piran Ghaib towards Peshawar Cantonment
Location
- Location within Punjab, Pakistan Location within Pakistan

Multan City Railway Station (Urdu and Punjabi: ملتان شہر ریلوے اسٹیشن)is an abandoned railway station located in Multan district of Punjab province of the Pakistan.

== See also ==
- List of railway stations in Pakistan
- Pakistan Railways
