= Riazabad railway station =

Railway station in Punjab, Pakistan

Riazabad Railway Station ریاض آباد ریلوے اسٹیشن

General information
- Owner: Ministry of Railways
- Line: Karachi–Peshawar Railway Line

Other information
- Station code: RZD

Services
Preceding station	Pakistan Railways	Following station
Tatipur towards Kiamari	Karachi–Peshawar Line	Kot Abbas Shaheed towards Peshawar Cantonment
Location

Riazabad Railway Station (Urdu and Punjabi: ریاض آباد ریلوے اسٹیشن) is located in Riazabad village, Multan district of Punjab province, Pakistan.

== See also ==
- List of railway stations in Pakistan
- Pakistan Railways
