= Shamkote railway station =

Railway station in Punjab, Pakistan

Shamkote Railway Station شام کوٹ ریلوے اسٹیشن

General information
- Owner: Ministry of Railways
- Line: Karachi–Peshawar Railway Line

Other information
- Station code: SMQ

Services
Preceding station	Pakistan Railways	Following station
Kot Abbas Shaheed towards Kiamari	Karachi–Peshawar Line	Khanewal Junction towards Peshawar Cantonment
Location

Shamkote Railway Station (Urdu and Punjabi: شام کوٹ ریلوے اسٹیشن) is located in Shamkote village, Khanewal district of Punjab province, Pakistan.

== See also ==
- List of railway stations in Pakistan
- Pakistan Railways
