= Mian Shamir railway station =

Railway station in Punjab, Pakistan

Mian Shamir Station میاں شامیر ریلوے اسٹیشن

General information
- Coordinates: 30.3665°N 71.9911°E
- Owner: Ministry of Railways
- Line: Khanewal–Wazirabad Branch Line

Other information
- Station code: MSHR

Services
Preceding station	Pakistan Railways	Following station
Khanewal Junction Terminus	Khanewal–Wazirabad Branch Line	Makhdumpur Pahoran towards Wazirabad Junction
Location

Mian Shamir railway station (Urdu and Punjabi: میاں شامیر ریلوے اسٹیشن) is located in Mian Shamir village, Khanewal district of Punjab province, Pakistan.

Its station code is MSHR, and it serves the Khanewal-Wazirabad rail route.

== See also ==
- List of railway stations in Pakistan
- Pakistan Railways
