= Kacha Khuh railway station =

Railway station in Punjab, Pakistan

Kacha Khuh Railway Station کچا کُھوہ ریلوے اسٹیشن

General information
- Coordinates: 30.3738°N 72.1432°E
- Owner: Ministry of Railways
- Line: Karachi–Peshawar Railway Line

Other information
- Station code: KHO

Services
Preceding station	Pakistan Railways	Following station
Rajput Nagar towards Kiamari	Karachi–Peshawar Line	Mohsinwal towards Peshawar Cantonment
Location

Kacha Khuh Railway Station (Urdu: کچّا کُھوہ ریلوے اسٹیشن) (Punjabi کچا کھوہ ریلوے اسٹیشن) is an abandoned railway station located in Kacha Khuh village, Khanewal district of the Punjab province of Pakistan.

== See also ==
- List of railway stations in Pakistan
- Pakistan Railways
