= DYR 105.1 FM =

Durban Youth Radio (DYR1051)
Durban; South Africa
- Frequency: 105.1 FM

Programming
- Language: English

Durban Youth Radio, known as DYR, is a community radio station which broadcasts on the 105.1 FM frequency in Durban, South Africa.

== History ==
The station was founded in 1995 at the University of Natal, later transferring to a non-profit form of ownership in 2000. The station was forced to close in 2010 due to financial problems. After a period off-air, DYR resumed broadcasting in 2012 at new premises.
