= Gatti railway station =

Railway station in Pakistan

General information
- Owner: Ministry of Railways

Other information
- Station code: GTZ

History
- Former names: Great Indian Peninsula Railway

Gatti railway station (Urdu: گاٹی ریلوے اسٹیشن) is located in Pakistan.

== See also ==
- List of railway stations in Pakistan
- Pakistan Railways
