= Gojra =

City in Punjab, Pakistan

Gojra گوجرا (Punjabi)
- City
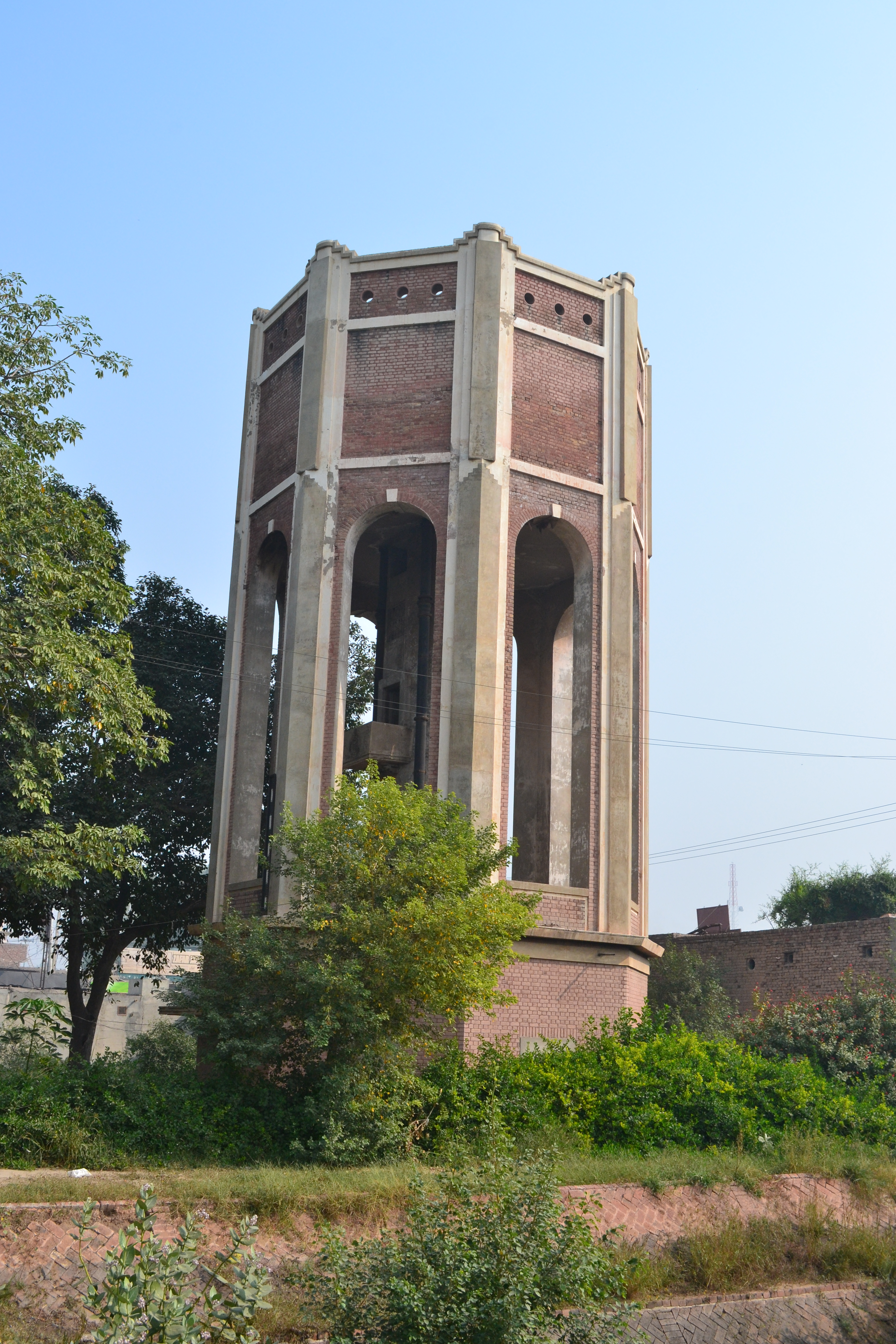
- Old water tank in Gojra

- Municipal Committee logo

- Location within Punjab Location within Pakistan
- Coordinates: 31°9′N 72°41′E
- Country: Pakistan
- Province: Punjab
- District: Toba Tek Singh District
- Established: 1896
- No of Towns: 21+

Government
  - Type: Municipal Committee
  - Chief Officer: Yasir Ali
  - Municipal officer (Finance): Asif Nadeem

Area
  - City: 9.7 sq mi (25 km^{2})
  - Metro: 0.625 sq mi (1.619 km^{2})
- Elevation: 1,526 ft (465 m)

Population (2023 census)
  - City: 214,349
  - Rank: 50th in Pakistan
  - Density: 22,000/sq mi (8,600/km^{2})
- Time zone: UTC+5 (PST)
  - Summer (DST): UTC+6 (PDT)
- Zip Code: 36120
- Area code: +9246

Gojra (Punjabi: گوجرا; Urdu: گوجرہ), is the administrative capital of Gojra Tehsil and a city in the Toba Tek Singh District in Punjab province of Pakistan.

Gojra is 50 kilometres (31 mi) from Faisalabad, 170 kilometres (110 mi) from Lahore and 20 miles (32 km) north of Toba Tek Singh. Founded in 1896 during the British colonial period, Gojra was the commercial centre of lands which had recently come under cultivation, and was known for its "mandi" (market) for cash crops. It is the 50th largest city of Pakistan by population, according to the 2017 census.

== History ==
Gojra or Gujara city took its name from the Punjabi Gujjar community who are the oldest inhabitants of the area.

=== Pre-Independence ===
Gojra city was established in 1896, when the colonisation of Faisalabad (formerly Lyallpur) began. The railway line between Faisalabad and Gojra was laid in 1899. The town was designated a notified area committee in 1904 and upgraded to a B-Class Municipality in 1925. In 1906, the population was 2,589. According to The Imperial Gazetteer of India, "The business done in this rising mart on the railway, which has sprung into existence in the last six years owing to the extension of the Chenab Canal to the surrounding country, bides fair to rival in importance that of Lyallpur itself".

In 1919, following the Rowlatt Act, hartals (strikes) broke out throughout Punjab. Gojra was affected by the serious protests and a member of the Church Mission Society had to be escorted out of the town by loyal residents.

=== Post-Independence ===
In August 1947, India and Pakistan achieved independence. Riots and local fighting followed the expeditious withdrawal of the British, resulting in an estimated one million civilians deaths, particularly in the western region of Punjab. Gojra, which was in the region of the Punjab Province that became West Pakistan, was populated by several Hindus and Sikhs who migrated to India, while Muslim refugees from India settled in the district.

After independence from Britain, in view of its increasing size, Gojra was declared a 2nd class Municipal Committee in 1960. Gojra received the status of tehsil town and was affiliated with the newly established district Toba Tek Singh on 1 July 1982. After the introduction of Devolution of Power Plan, the Tehsil Municipal Administration Gojra came into being on 12 August 2001.

== Demographics ==
Population

Historical population

Year	Pop.	±% p.a.
1951	20,407	—
1961	29,665	+3.81%
1972	41,975	+3.21%
1981	68,000	+5.51%

Year	Pop.	±% p.a.
1998	117,892	+3.29%
2017	174,860	+2.10%
2023	214,349	+3.45%

According to 2023 census, Gojra had a population of 214,349.

Languages

Languages of Gojra MC (2023 Census)
1. Punjabi (93.6%)
2. Urdu (6.00%)
3. Others (0.40%)

== Government and public services ==
=== Civic administration ===
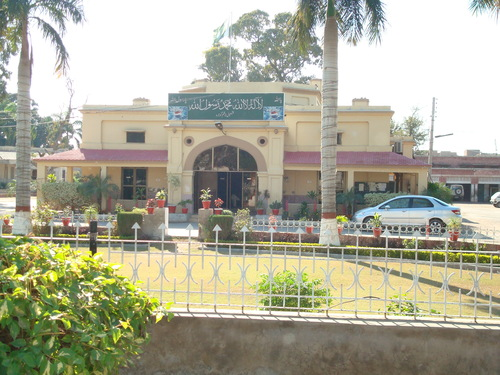
Civic Administration Building

The city was raised to the status of Tehsil town and affiliated with the newly established district Toba Tek Singh on 1 July 1982. After the introduction of the Devolution of Powers Plan, the Tehsil Municipal Administration Gojra came into being on 12 August 2001. The Canal resthouse is the oldest building constructed during British government in 1898.

=== Transport ===
Gojra Railway Station (Urdu: گوجرہ ریلوے اسٹیشن) is located in Gojra city, Toba Tek Singh district of Punjab province of the Pakistan.

== Culture ==
=== Festivals ===
The arrival of spring brings the annual "Rang-e-Bahar" festival during the month of March, where the Parks & Horticulture Authority of the Gojra Municipal Committee organise a flower show and exhibition at Civil Club, Gojra.

== Education ==
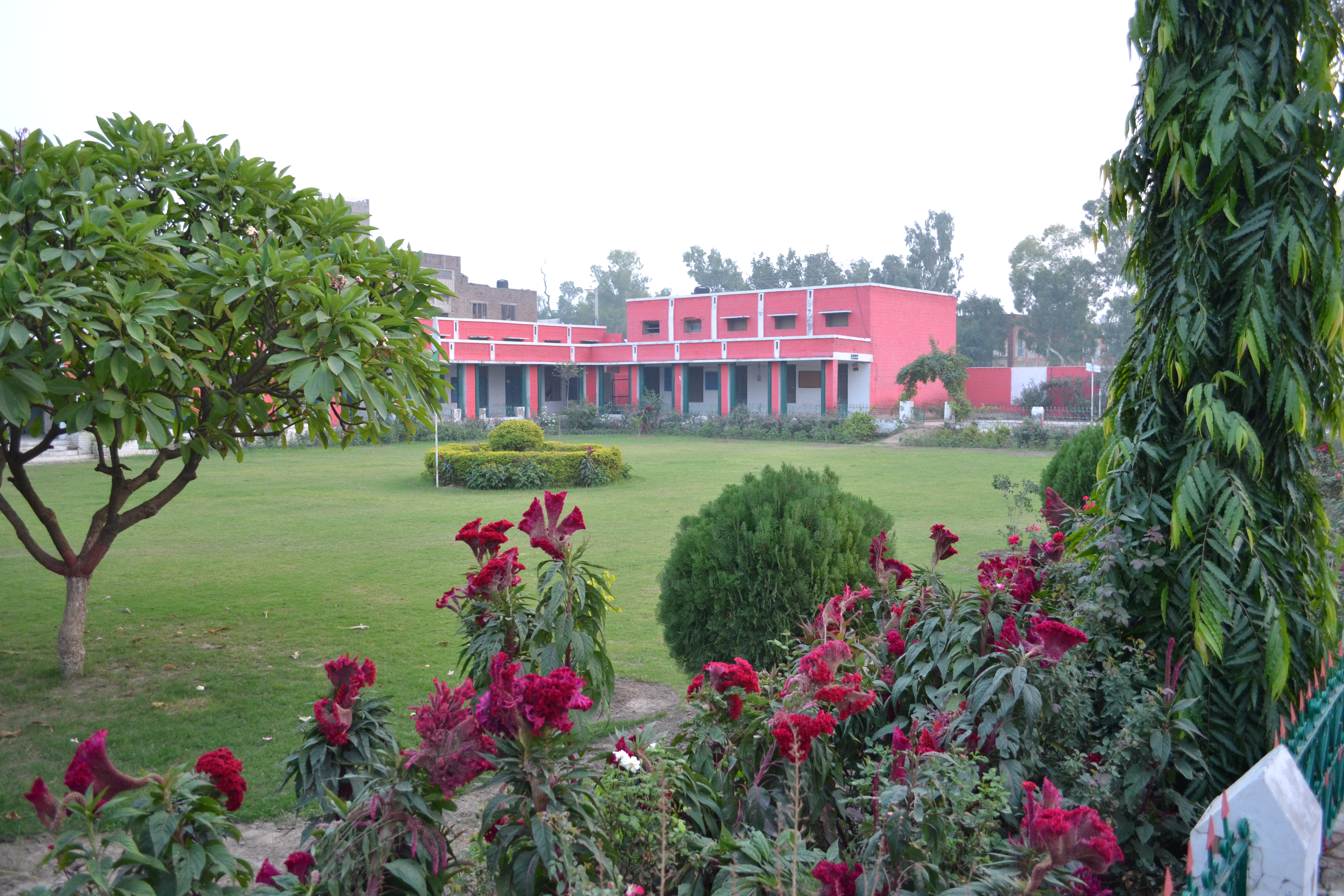
MC High School Gojra

=== Private institutes ===
The city has 344 state-run primary and higher secondary educational institutions.

== Sports ==
Gojra is famous for hockey and has produced more than a hundred international players for the Pakistan hockey team. In 2015, Gojra Hockey Club, a local club, won the Jat Tar Singh memorial Under-19 hockey tournament. This high-profile tournament was held in India, where Gojra city team competed again best of Indian U19 hockey teams and won the championship. The Gojra team won this title by defeating Amritsar Academy 4–2 at Ludhiana Hockey Stadium.

In cricket, Gojra's Ehsan Adil has represented the Faisalabad Wolves, Habib Bank Limited cricket team and Pakistan Under-19 cricket team. He was selected in Pakistan's Test Squad for tour to South Africa in February 2013.

== Notable people ==
- Ehsan Adil – cricketer
- Abdul Qadeer Alvi – Politician
- Tariq Imran – hockey player
- Muhammad Irfan – hockey player
- Muhammad Ishaq – former Member, National Assembly of Pakistan
- Chaudhary Khalid Javed – Member, National Assembly of Pakistan
- Mehak Malik – dancer and actress
- Muhammad Nadeem – hockey player
- Muhammad Qasim – hockey player and former Olympic Games player
- Imran Shah – hockey player
- Tahir Zaman – hockey player, former Olympic Games player, Pride of Performance Award winner in 1994

== See also ==
- Gojra railway station
- 2009 Gojra riots
