= Dunyapur railway station =

Railway station in Punjab, Pakistan

Dunyapur Station دُنیا پُور ریلوے اسٹیشن
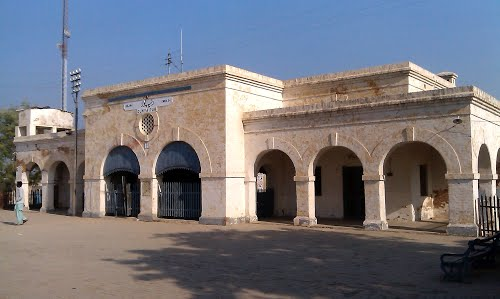

General information
- Coordinates: 29.8067°N 71.7212°E
- Owner: Ministry of Railways
- Line: Lodhran-Khanewal Branch Line

Other information
- Station code: DYR

History
- Opened: 1909

Services
| Preceding station | Pakistan Railways | Following station |
|---|---|---|
| Rukanpur towards Lodhran Junction | Lodhran–Khanewal Chord Line | Kutabpur towards Khanewal Junction |
Location

Dunyapur railway station (Urdu and Punjabi: دُنیا پُور ریلوے اسٹیشن) is located in Dunyapur City, Lodhran district of Punjab province of the Pakistan. Dunyapur Railway Station is located on the Chord Line (connecting Lodhran and Khanewal via Jahanian). There are eight stations on this line, with Jahanian and Dunyapur being the most significant. Official records of the North Western Railway (NWR) confirm the completion and inauguration in 1909 of the 56-mile (90 km) direct section (Chord Line) between Khanewal and Lodhran; stations like Dunyapur were established along this new main route.

The Allama Iqbal Express and Millat Express make scheduled stops here, while other passenger trains pass through without stopping. It is an extremely busy railway line, as the majority of freight trains also transit through this route.

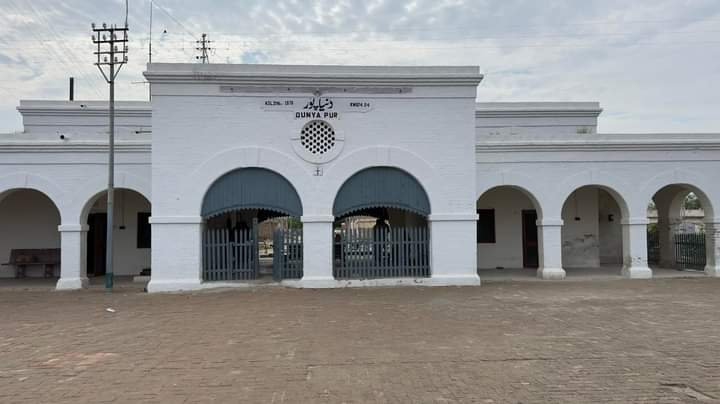

== See also ==
- List of railway stations in Pakistan
- Pakistan Railways
