= Alisar Halt railway station =

Railway station in Pakistan

Alisar Halt railway station علیسر ہالٹ ریلوے اسٹیشن

General information
- Coordinates: 30.89323°N 72.37982°E
- Owner: Ministry of Railways

Other information
- Station code: ALIS

History
- Former names: Great Indian Peninsula Railway
Location
- Location within Punjab, Pakistan Location within Pakistan

Alisar Halt railway station (Urdu: علیسر ہالٹ ریلوے اسٹیشن) is located in Pakistan.

== See also ==
- List of railway stations in Pakistan
- Pakistan Railways
