= Sirajwala railway station =

Railway station in Pakistan

General information
- Coordinates: 29.7222°N 71.6871°E
- Owner: Ministry of Railways

Other information
- Station code: SRJW

History
- Former names: Great Indian Peninsula Railway
Location

Sirajwala railway station (Urdu: سراج والا ریلوے اسٹیشن) is located in Pakistan.

== See also ==
- List of railway stations in Pakistan
- Pakistan Railways
