= Sultan Nagar railway station =

Railway station in Pakistan

Coordinates: 31.528595°N 73.16408°E

General information
- Owner: Ministry of Railways

Other information
- Station code: SLNR

History
- Former names: Great Indian Peninsula Railway
Location

Sultan Nagar railway station (Urdu: سلطان نگر ریلوے اسٹیشن) is located in Pakistan.

== See also ==
- List of railway stations in Pakistan
- Pakistan Railways
