= Shori Chattha railway station =

Railway station in Pakistan

General information
- Owner: Ministry of Railways

Other information
- Station code: SHOA

Shori Chattha railway station (Urdu: شوری چٹھہ ریلوے اسٹیشن) is located in Punjab, Pakistan.

== See also ==
- List of railway stations in Pakistan
- Pakistan Railways
