= Kot Salim Shahid railway station =

Railway Station in Pakistan

Kot Saleem Shaheed Railway Station

General information
- Coordinates: 31.1949°N 72.7367°E
- Owner: Ministry of Railways

Other information
- Station code: KSHD

History
- Former names: Great Indian Peninsula Railway
Location

Kot Saleem Shaheed Railway Station (Urdu: کوٹ سلیم شہید ریلوے اسٹیشن) is a station in Pakistan.

== See also ==
- List of railway stations in Pakistan
- Pakistan Railways
