= Mehak Malik =

Pakistani transgender dancer (born 1995)

- Born: March 11, 1995 (age 31); Toba Tek Singh District, Punjab, Pakistan
- Occupations: Dancer, tiktoker, stage performer
- Years active: 2019–present

Mehak Malik (born 11 March 1995) is a Pakistani transgender dancer, TikToker, and stage actor known for her mujra performances. She gained popularity through social media and live stage shows, primarily in Punjab, and regularly performs in cities such as Multan. Malik has amassed millions of followers on platforms including TikTok and YouTube, where she shares dance videos, often set to Bollywood songs.

== Early life ==
Mehak Malik was born as Kashan Rajpoot on 11 March 1995 in Toba Tek Singh District, Punjab, Pakistan. Her family belongs to the Malik Kokar caste, with roots tracing back to migrants from Ludhiana District, Punjab, India, who settled in Pakistan following the 1947 Partition.

Raised in a conservative Muslim household, Malik has five brothers and one sister. From a young age, she showed interest in dance and performance, often mimicking songs by Pakistani singer Noor Jehan. However, her family initially disapproved of her inclinations, sending her to learn barbering instead. She left home to join a transgender community, adopting the name Mehak Malik and identifying as transgender.

She received formal dance training from transgender performer Sheen Jaan (also known as Shaheen Jaan), who became her mentor.

== Career ==
Malik began performing at weddings in the south Punjab region and moved into the Punjabi theatre circuit around 2018, appearing initially through Multan's Babar Theatre and other venues associated with the Multan, Rawalpindi, Gujranwala Punjabi stage drama network. She became a regular performer of mujra on the Punjabi stage, dancing to a mixture of Punjabi, Saraiki and Bollywood numbers.

Malik began featuring in Punjabi stage show clips on the YouTube channel Shaheen Studio and later launched her own channel and became a TikToker.

== Legal issues and controversies ==
=== Vehari abduction case (2021–2022) ===
In July 2021, an Additional Sessions Judge in Vehari, Ghulam Shabbir Hussain Gul, ordered the registration of a case of abduction for ransom against Mehak Malik and three co-accused on the application of one Sharifaan Bibi of Chak No. 204/EB, who alleged that Malik and her associates had abducted her son Faisal Abbas and were demanding Rs. 2 million (US$7,200) for his release. Sadar police, Vehari, initially registered a case at Police Picket 48/Pul, and Malik was called for investigation before the District Police Officer alongside her lawyer amid heavy security.

Later that month, a special team constituted by Deputy Superintendent of Police Mazhar Hayat Hiraj had located Faisal Abbas in Sahuka village near Burewala, where he was living of his own accord in a rented building, and that police had accordingly treated the abduction as fabricated. Despite this, further judicial proceedings continued and in December 2022, Civil Judge/Magistrate Kashan Muhammad Ali of Vehari framed formal charges against Malik and her co-accused, setting a further hearing for 20 January 2023; the complainants alleged that Malik was pressuring them to withdraw the case.

=== Multan theatre shooting (2024) ===
On 7 August 2024, an unidentified assailant opened fire at Babar Theatre in Multan, where Malik was performing. She was unhurt in the attack. A case was registered at Chahelyek Police Station on the complaint of her brother, and the theatre's focal person Shafiq Chandia publicly criticised its management over what he described as inadequate security.

=== Bahawalpur mehndi case (2025) ===
On 10 April 2025, Bahawalpur police registered a first information report against Malik and 34 others in connection with a mehndi ceremony held in a village near Mandi Yazman, booking them under the Amplifier Act for what the FIR described as an obscene dance performance and the showering of currency notes on the performer. Police said Malik had been invited to perform at the private wedding-related function and had allegedly danced in revealing attire to explicit songs; ten of the accused were named in the FIR, with 25 others left unidentified, and some government employees, including a police constable, were reportedly present at the event.
