= Jan Muhammad Wala railway station =

Railway station in Punjab, Pakistan

Jan Muhammad Wala Station جان محمد والا ریلوے اسٹیشن

General information
- Coordinates: 30.4954°N 72.0937°E
- Owner: Ministry of Railways
- Line: Khanewal–Wazirabad Branch Line

Other information
- Station code: JMW

Services
| Preceding station | Pakistan Railways | Following station |
|---|---|---|
| Makhdumpur Pahoran towards Khanewal Junction | Khanewal–Wazirabad Branch Line | Abdul Hakim towards Wazirabad Junction |
Location

Jan Muhammad Wala railway station (Urdu and Punjabi: جان محمد والا ریلوے اسٹیشن) is located in Jan Muhammad Wala village, Khanewal district of Punjab province, Pakistan.

== See also ==
- List of railway stations in Pakistan
- Pakistan Railways
