= Khanowal =

- Village
- Location in Punjab, India Khanowal (India)
- Coordinates: 31.326616°N 75.380567°E
- Country: India
- State: Punjab
- District: Kapurthala

Government
  - Type: Panchayati raj (India)
  - Body: Gram panchayat

Population (2011)
  - Total: 1,051
- Sex ratio 544/507♂/♀

Languages
  - Official: Punjabi
  - Other spoken: Hindi
- Time zone: UTC+5:30 (IST)
- PIN: 144602
- Telephone code: 01822
- ISO 3166 code: IN-PB
- Vehicle registration: PB-09
- Website: kapurthala.gov.in

Khanowal is a village in Kapurthala district of Punjab State, India. It is located 12 kilometres (7.5 mi) from Kapurthala, which is both district and sub-district headquarters of Khanowal. The village is administrated by a Sarpanch who is an elected representative of village as per the constitution of India and Panchayati raj (India).

== Demography ==
According to the report published by Census India in 2011, Khanowal has 211 houses with a total population of 1,051 persons, of which 544 are male and 507 are female. Literacy rate of Khanowal is 71.81%, lower than the state average of 75.84%. The population of children in the age group 0–6 years is 125, which is 11.89% of the total population. Child sex ratio is approximately 838, lower than the state average of 846.

== Population data ==
| Particulars | Total | Male | Female |
|---|---|---|---|
| Total No. of Houses | 211 | - | - |
| Population | 1,051 | 544 | 507 |
| Child (0-6) | 125 | 68 | 57 |
| Schedule Caste | 372 | 192 | 180 |
| Schedule Tribe | 0 | 0 | 0 |
| Literacy | 71.81 % | 75.42 % | 68.00 % |
| Total Workers | 368 | 300 | 68 |
| Main Worker | 364 | 0 | 0 |
| Marginal Worker | 4 | 3 | 1 |
