= Bilasur =

Bilasur بیلاسور
- Village
- Location within Pakistan
- Coordinates: 31.03°N 72.34°E
- Country: Pakistan
- Province: Punjab
- Elevation: 162 m (531 ft)
- Time zone: UTC+5 (PST)

Bilasur (Urdu: بیلاسور) is a town of Toba Tek Singh District in the Punjab province of Pakistan. It is located at 31°3'0N 72°34'0E with an altitude of 162 metres (534 feet). Neighbouring settlements include Janiwala and Jaimal Singh.
