= Chak 317 JB Noorpur =

- Village
- Noorpur نورپور
- Location within Pakistan
- Coordinates: 31.0961974°N 72.5312769°E
- Country: Pakistan
- Province: Punjab

Government
  - Mayor: قاضی شہاب الدین مہر
  - Mayor: بشیر احمد مہر

Area
  - Total: 5 km^{2} (1.9 sq mi)
- Elevation: 162 m (531 ft)

Population (2026)
  - Total: 5,000
- Time zone: UTC+5 (PST)

Chak 317 JB Noorpur (Urdu: نور پور), also known as Noorpur Arain, is a village of Toba Tek Singh District in the Punjab province of Pakistan. It is located at 31.0961974, 72.5312769 with an altitude of 162 metres (534 feet). Neighbouring settlements include Janiwala and Chak 375 JB Masitian.
