= Khanewal Junction railway station =

Railway station in Pakistan

Coordinates: 30.3095°N 71.9285°E

Khanewal Junction Railway Station خانیوال جنکشن ریلوے اسٹیشن
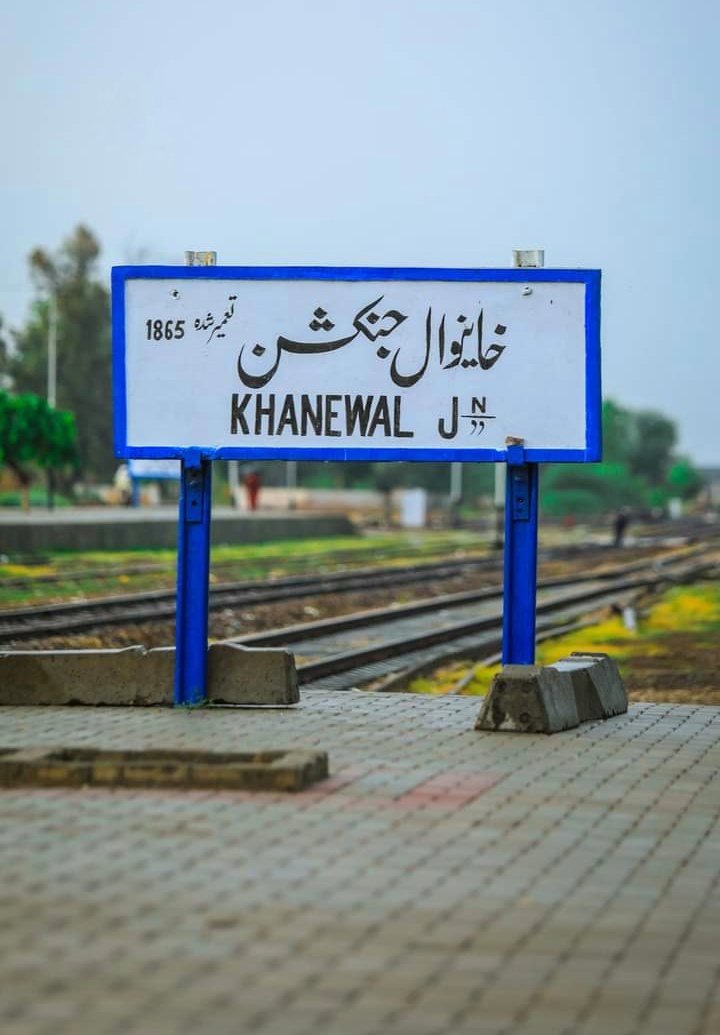

General information
- Owner: Ministry of Railways
- Lines: Karachi–Peshawar Railway Line; Lodhran-Khanewal Branch Line; Khanewal–Wazirabad Branch Line
- Platforms: 8

Construction
- Parking: Available
- Accessible: Available

Other information
- Station code: KWL

History
- Opened: 1865

Services
Preceding station	Pakistan Railways	Following station
Shamkote towards Kiamari	Karachi–Peshawar Line	Dera Taj towards Peshawar Cantonment
Mehar Shah towards Lodhran Junction	Lodhran–Khanewal Chord Line	Terminus
Terminus	Khanewal–Wazirabad Branch Line	Mian Shamir towards Wazirabad Junction
Location

Khanewal Junction Railway Station (Urdu and Punjabi: خانیوال جنکشن ریلوے اسٹیشن) is located in the city of Khanewal, Punjab province of Pakistan. It is a major railway station of Pakistan Railways and the junction of Khanewal-Wazirabad branch railway line. It is the stop for all Express trains.

The station is staffed and has advance and current reservation offices. Food stalls are also located on it platforms.

== Train routes ==
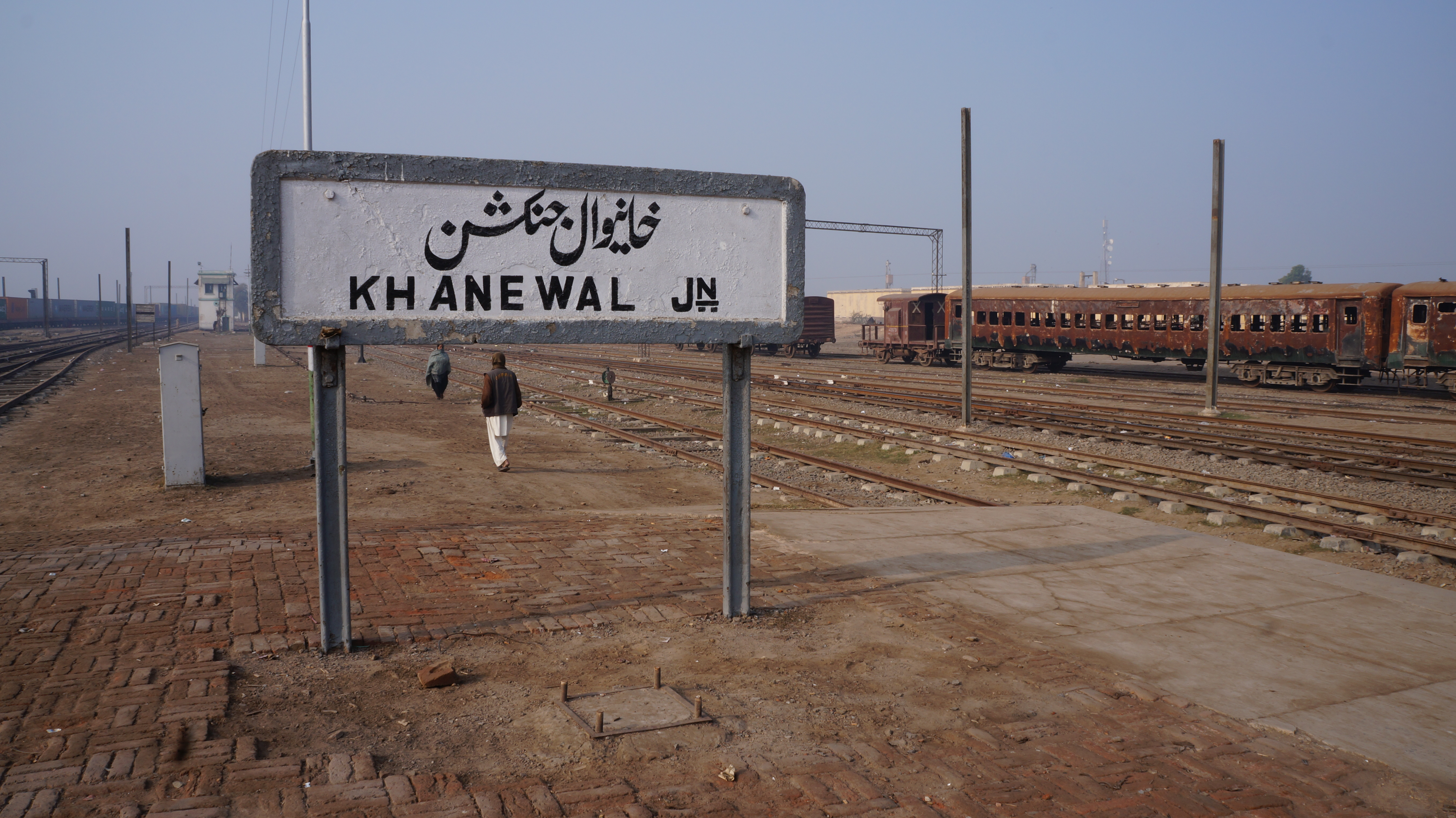

The routes from Khanewal offer train links to Karachi, Lahore, Rawalpindi, Peshawar, Quetta, Multan, Faisalabad, Sargodha, Jhang, Hyderabad, Sibi, Sukkur, Attock, Rahim Yar Khan, Bahawalpur, Gujrat, Gujranwala, Rohri, Jacobabad, Nawabshah and Nowshera.

== Train services ==
Train Name	Train Code	Stations
Allama Iqbal Express	9 UP, 10 DN	Karachi Cantt, Hyderabad Jn, Nawabshah, Mehrabpur, Rohri Jn, Sadiqabad, Rahim Yar Khan, Khanpur, Bahawalpur, Jehanian, Khanewal Jn, Sahiwal, Okara Cantt, Pattoki, Kot Radha Kishen, Raiwind Jn, Kot Lakhpat, Lahore Jn, Shahdara Bagh, Narang, Baddomalhi, Narowal, Pasrur, Chawinda, Sialkot
Awam Express	13 UP, 14 DN	Karachi Cantt, Landhi, Jungshahi, Jhimpir, Kotri Jn, Hyderabad Jn, Tando Adam, Shahdadpur, Nawabshah, Pad Idan, Bhiria Road, Mehrabpur, Setharja, Ranipur, Gambat, Khairpur, Rohri Jn, Pano Akil, Ghotki, Mirpur Mathelo, Daharki, Sadiqabad, Rahim Yar Khan, Khanpur, Liaquatpur, Dera Nawab Sahib, Samasata Jn, Bahawalpur, Shujabad, Multan Cantt, Khanewal Jn, Chichawatni, Sahiwal, Okara Cantt, Pattoki, Kot Radha Kishan, Raiwand Jn, Kot Lakhpat, Lahore Jn, Gujranwala, Wazirabad Jn, Gujrat, Lala Musa Jn, Kharian Cantt, Jhelum, Gujar Khan, Chak Lala, Rawalpindi, Taxila Jn, Hasan Abdal, Attock Jn, Jhangira Road, Nowshera Jn, Peshawar City, Peshawar Cantt
Hazara Express	11 UP, 12 DN	Karachi City, Karachi Cantt, Drigh Road, Landhi Jn, Kotri Jn, Hyderabad Jn, Tando Adam, Nawabshah, Pad Idan, Bhiria Road, Mehrabpur Jn, Rohri Jn, Pano Akil, Mirpur Mathelo, Sadiqabad, Rahim Yar Khan, Khanpur Jn, Liaquatpur, Dera Nawab Sahib, Samasata Jn, Bahawalpur, Shujabad, Multan Cantt, Riazabad, Khanewal Jn, Shorkot Cantt Jn, Jhang Sadar, Sillanwali, Shaheenabad Jn, Sargodha Jn, Bhalwal, Malakwal Jn, Mandi Bahauddin, Lala Musa Jn, Jhelum, Gujar Khan, Rawalpindi, Taxila Jn, Haripur Hazara, Havelian
Jaffar Express	39 UP, 40 DN	Quetta, Kolpur, Mach, Aab-e-gum, Sibi Jn, Bakhtiarabad Domki, Dera Murad Jamali, Dera Allah Yar, Jacobabad Jn, Shikarpur, Sukkur, Rohri Jn, Sadiqabad, Rahim Yar Khan, Bahawalpur, Multan Cantt, Khanewal Jn, Sahiwal, Okara Cantt, Raiwind Jn, Lahore Jn, Gujranwala, Wazirabad Jn, Gujrat, Lalamusa Jn, Jhelum, Rawalpindi
Karakoram Express	41 UP, 42 DN	Karachi Cantt, Hyderabad Jn, Nawabshah, Rohri Jn, Khanewal Jn, Faisalabad, Lahore Jn
Karachi Express	15 UP, 16 DN	Karach cantt, Hyderabad Jn, Nawabshah, Rohri Jn, Bahawalpur, Multan Cantt, Khanewal Jn, Sahiwal, Raiwind Jn, Kot Lakhpat, Lahore Jn,
Khyber Mail	1 UP, 2 DN	Karachi Cantt, Landhi, Hyderabad Jn, Nawabshah, Khairpur, Rohri Jn, Pano Akil, Ghotki, Mirpur Mathelo, Daharki, Sadiqabad, Rahim Yar Khan. Khanpur, Liaquatpur, Dera Nawab Sahib, Samasata Jn, Bahawalpur, Lodhran Jn, Shujabad, Multan Cantt, Khanewal Jn, Mian Channun, Chichawatni, Sahiwal, Okara Cantt, Pattoki, Raiwind Jn, Kot Lakhpat, Lahore Jn, Gujranwala, Wazirabad Jn, Gujrat, Lala Musa Jn, Jhelum, Rawalpindi, Attock city Jn, Jhangira Road, Nowshera, Peshawar City, Peshawar Cantt
Millat Express	17 UP, 18 DN	Karachi Cantt, Hyderabad Jn, Rohri Jn, Bahawalpur, Khanewal Jn, Shorkot Cantt Jn, Toba Tek Singh, Faisalabad, Chak Jhumra Jn, Chiniot, Shaheenabad Jn, Sargodha Jn
Pak Business Express	33UP, 34DN	Lahore, Sahiwal, Khanewal, Bahawalpur, Rahim Yar Khan, Rohri, Nawabshah, Hyderabad, Karachi Cantt.
Pakistan Express	45 UP, 46 DN	Karachi Cantt, Hyderabad Jn, Rohri Jn, Rahim Yar Khan, Khanpur, Bahawalpur, Multan Cantt, Khanewal Jn, Shorkot Cantt Jn, Toba Tek Singh, Gojra, Faisalabad, Sangla Hill Jn, * Hafizabad, Alipur Chatta, Wazirabad Jn, Gujrat, Lala Musa Jn, Jhelum, Rawalpindi
Akbar Express	23 UP, 24 DN	Quetta, Kolpur, Mach, Aab-e-gum, Sibi Jn, Bakhtiarabad Domki, Dera Murad Jamali, Dera Allah Yar, Jacobabad Jn, Shikarpur, Sukkur, Rohri Jn, Pano Akil, Ghotki, Mirpur Mathelo, Sadiqabad, Rahim Yar Khan, Khanpur, Dera Nawab Sahib, Bahawalpur, Khanewal Jn, Shorkot Cantt Jn, Faisalabad, Lahore Jn
Tezgam	7 UP, 8 DN	Karachi Cantt, Hyderabad Jn, Tando Adam, Nawabshah, Khairpur, Rohri Jn, Rahim Yar Khan, Khanpur, Bhawalpur, Multan Cantt, Khanewal Jn, Mian Channu, Chichawatni, Sahiwal, Okara Cantt, Pattoki, Kot Radha Kishan, Raiwind Jn, Kot Lakhpat, Lahore Jn, Gujranwala, Lalamusa Jn, Jhelum, Rawalpindi

== Gallery ==
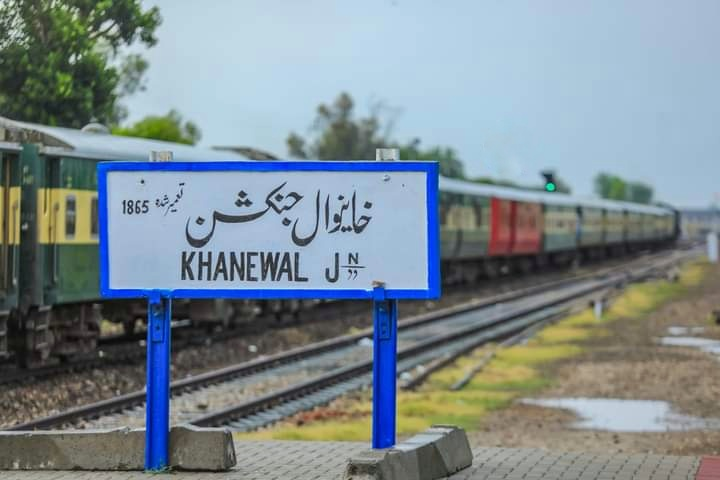

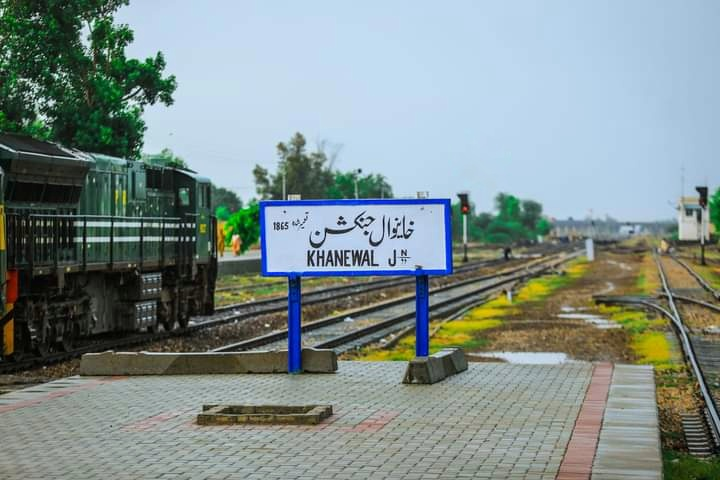

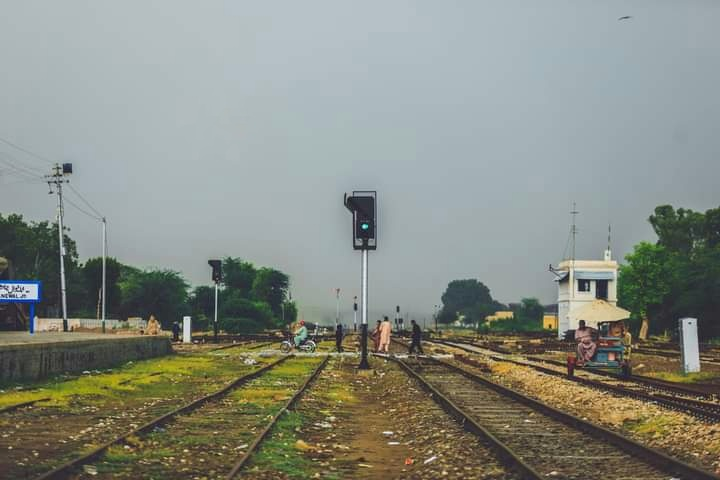

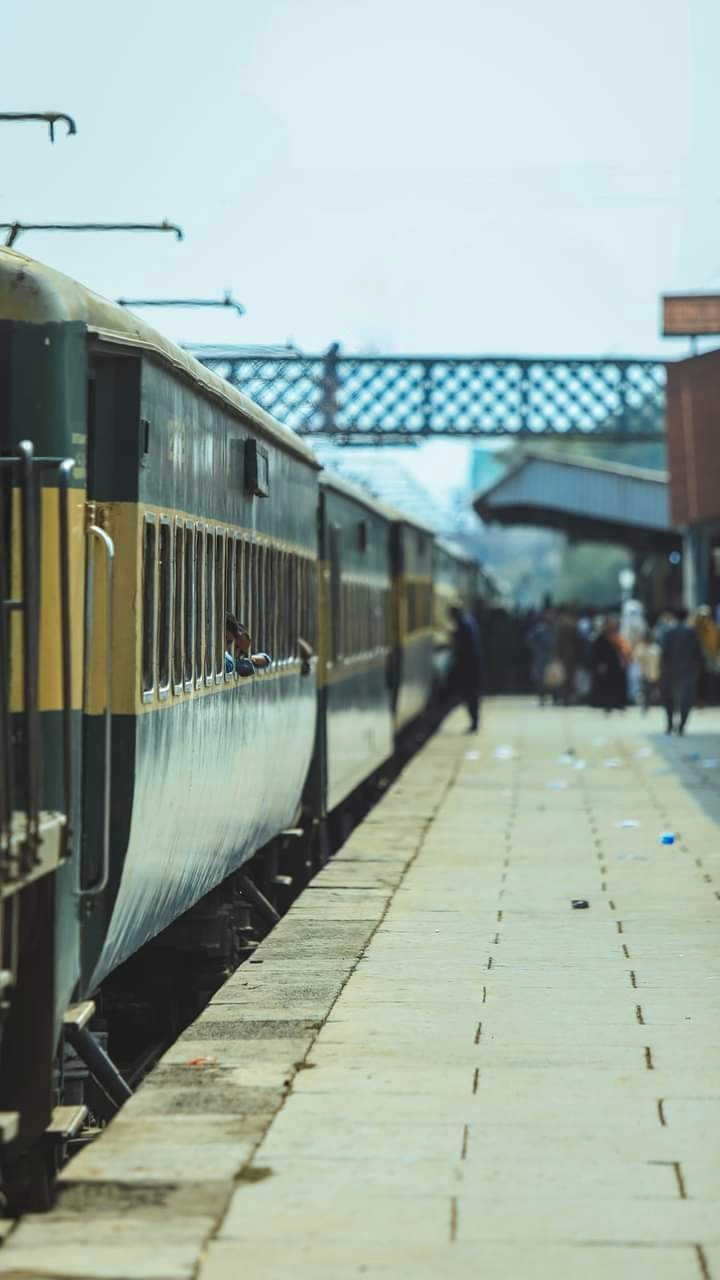

== See also ==
- List of railway stations in Pakistan
- Pakistan Railways
