= Provincial highways of Sindh =

Public roads in Sindh, Pakistan

The provincial highways of Sindh consists of all public highways maintained by Sindh province, Pakistan. The Sindh Highways Department under the Works & Services Department maintains over 4,800 kilometres (3,000 mi) of roadways organised into various classifications which crisscross the province and provide access to major population centers. These are not to be confused with national highways which are federal roads maintained by the Government of Pakistan and the National Highway Authority.

== List of provincial highways ==
Provincial highways of Sindh
Highway	Course	Length	Existing	Via	Lanes	Remarks
S01	Sehwan – Kai	30 km	30 km	via Jhangara	2	Begins at Sehwan N-55 National Highway interchange.
S02	Dadu – Chhini	36 km	36 km	via Johi	2	
S04	Kakar – Gaj	38 km	38 km	via	2	
S05	Dadu – Moro	11 km	11 km	via	2	
S06	Moro – Kandiaro	60 km	60 km	via Tharu Shah	2	
S07	Larkana – Mehar	63 km	63 km	via Mohenjo-daro	2	
S09	Larkana - Qubo Saeed Khan	70 km	70 km	via Shahdadkot	2	
S11	Jacobabad – Shahdadkot	16 km	16 km	via Garhi Khairo	2	
S13	Ratodero – Sher Muhammad Thahim	32 km	32 km	via	2	
S15	Lakhi – Larkana	34 km	34 km	via Naudero	2	
S18	Jacobabad – Kandhkot	78 km	78 km	via Thul	2	
S19	Ubauro – Kashmore	20 km	20 km	via Guddu	2	
S20	Ubauro – Runwati	33 km	33 km		2	
S21	Mirpur Mathelo – Yarolund	35 km	35 km	via Jarwar	2	
S23	Ghotki – Sangrar	39 km	39 km	via Khanpur Mahar, Thikrato	2	
S25	Khairpur – Ranipur	45 km	45 km	via Gambat	2	
S28	Kot Diji – Sanghar	145 km	145 km	via Choondiko, Tajal	2	Nara Highway
S31	Saeedabad -Nawabshah – Khairpur	128 km	128 km	via Nawabshah, Kot Lalu	2	Mehran Highway Connects N-5 National Highway and N-305 National Highway. Serves as alternate north–south transport route. Extended to Saeedabad
S33	Nawabshah – Mirpur Khas	128 km	128 km	via Sanghar	2	
S35	Nawabshah – Sakrand	21 km	21 km	via Dalail Kot	2	National Highway N-305
S49	Malir – Darsano Chano	18 km	18 km	via Murad Memon Goth	2	
S50	Karachi – Hyderabad	166 km	166 km	via Thatta	4	M9 Motorway Pakistan
S52	M9 Interchange – Thano Ahmad Khan	26 km	26 km	via Thano Bulla Khan	2	
S55	Nawabshah _ Bhit Shah	67 km	18 km	via Sarhari	2	Section I (Nawabshah - Sarhari) upgrading Section II (Sarhari- Bhit Shah) Under construction
In total		4800 km	4800 km			

== See also ==
- Motorways of Pakistan
- National highways of Pakistan
- Transport in Pakistan
- National Highway Authority
