= Mehran Highway =

Sindh provincial road (Two-way road) in Pakistan

Highway S–31
- Mehran Highway مهران شاہراہ مِهِراڻ ُ هاءِوي
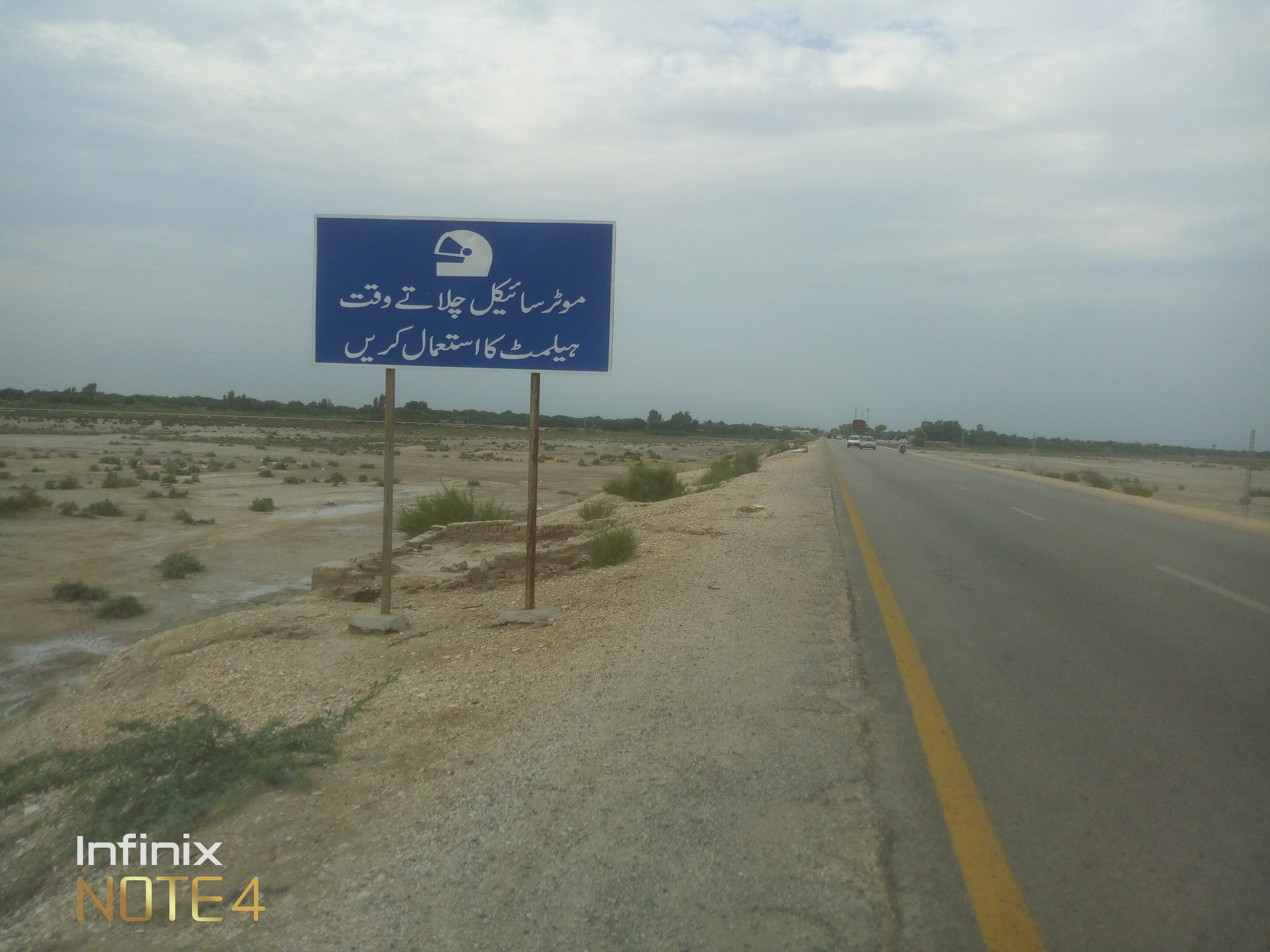

Route information
- Maintained by Sindh Highways Department
- Length: 163 km (101 mi)

Major junctions
- North end: at Khairpur(near Therhi)
- South end: at Nawabshah

Location
- Country: Pakistan
- Major cities: Daur; Bandhi; Kot Lalu; Thari Mirwah; Ranipur

Highway system
- Roads in Pakistan

Mehran Highway (Sindhi: مِهِراڻ ُ هاءِوي, Urdu: مهران شاہراہ, also known locally as Nawabshah–Kot Lalu–Kumb Road and officially as Highway 31) is a two-lane-wide, bidirectional, single carriageway, provincially maintained highway in Sindh that extends from Khairpur to Nawabshah. The route is generally rural, passing near several smaller towns including Daur and Bandhi in Shaheed Benazir Abad District and Kot Lalu, Pacca Chang, Karoondi, Sui Gas, and Ranipur in Khairpur District. The northern terminus merges with the N-5 National Highway at Ranipur while the southern terminus merges with N-305 National Highway at Zero Point Nawabshah.

== History ==
Prior to reconstruction of the Mehran Highway, the route was known as Kumb–Nawabshah Road. Reconstruction of the road had been pending for several years due to red tapism, causing accidents and diseases due to incomplete sections of the road where dust rising after passing of vehicles would also destroy crops alongside. The Sindh Highways Department completed reconstruction in June 2015 and was funded by the Asian Development Bank.

== Project for dualization ==
The Government of Sindh in 2025 had put forward a project for dualization of the Mehran Highway between Nawabshah and Ranipur. The Dualization of Mehran Highway from Nawabshah to Ranipur project will cover 135 kilometres of road distance, including the building of a new carriageway on both sides of the highway. The revised estimate cost of this project was Rs 41.034 billion, financed by both the federal and Sindh Governments.

Under the dualization plan, there will be widening and development of road infrastructure in the form of dualization for the improvement of traffic connectivity between Nawabshah and Ranipur. This project will be one of the many major road infrastructure projects undertaken by the Government under federal-provincial joint financial arrangement.

Subsequently, the project has been identified as a major road infrastructure project. Sardar Mohammad Ashraf D. Baluch (Pvt.) Ltd. is one of the firms that has listed the Dualization of Mehran Highway from Nawabshah to Ranipur as an ongoing project with its schedule completion date on 26 December 2027.

The dualized highway is likely to result in improved safety, reduced congestion and delays, and increased connectivity between Shaheed Benazirabad and Khairpur districts.

== Deadly Accidents ==
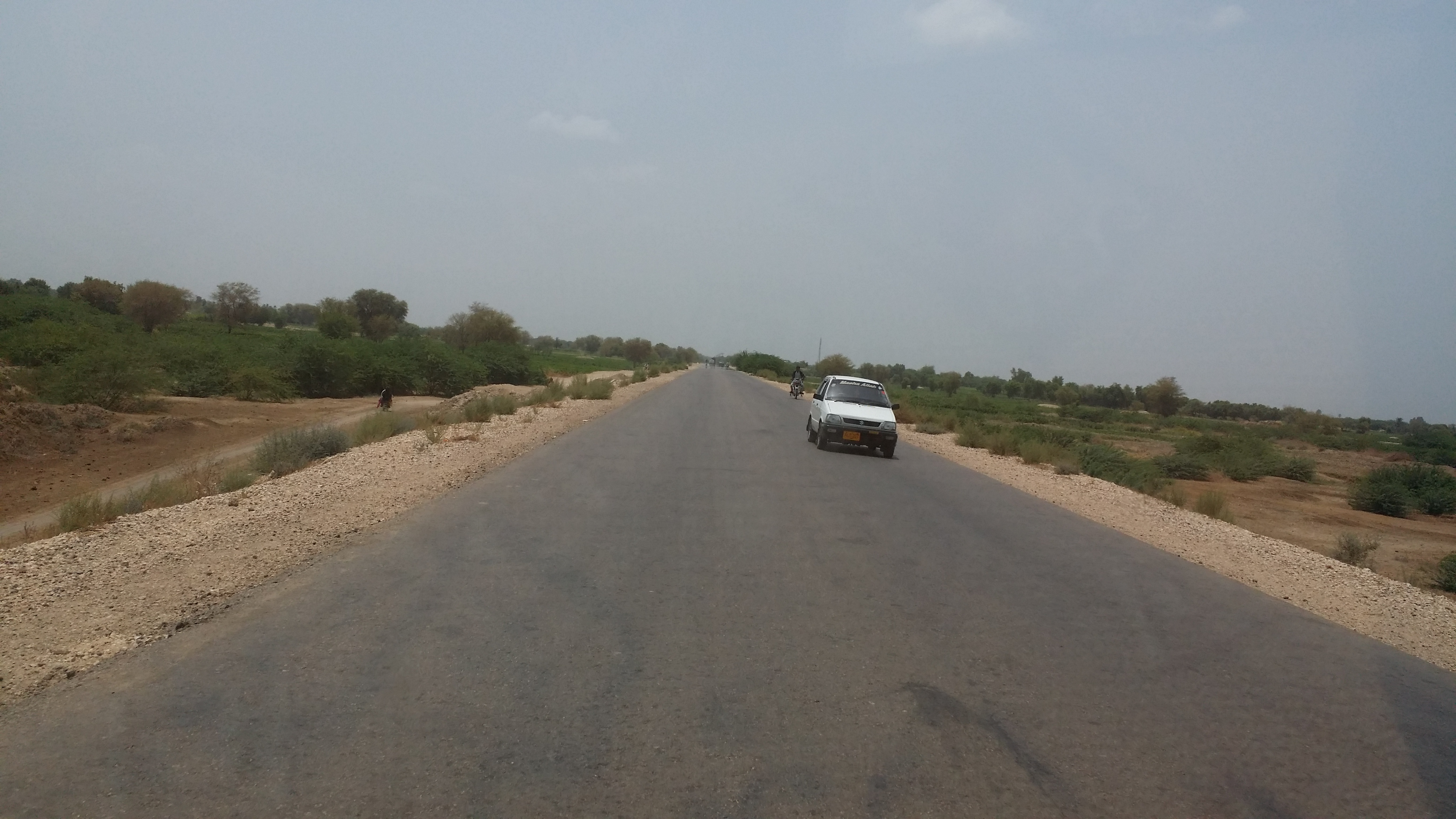
View of Mehran Highway, also known as the Nawabshah–Kot Lalu–Kumb Road, prior to reconstruction.

The Mehran Highway is a high volume traffic deadly road, as it connects Nawabshah and Khairpur districts and offers a shortcut to and from Sukkur. Despite Supreme court ban many heavy transport vehicles which are traveling from Karachi to Punjab, Khyber Pakhtunkhwa, Gilgit-Baltistan, and Azad Jammu & Kashmir and back, often use this two-lane highway to avoid the N-5 National Highway traffic or toll tax. Police personnel are deployed at highway entrance points to stop high tonnage vehicles from entering but they, instead, take bribes and allow the heavy vehicles to proceed. Due to those heavy vehicles and commuter buses and coaches passing through Mehran highway many deadly accidents have taken place in the past few years.

On 20 August 2013, a passenger bus from Uch Sharif (Bahawalpur) overturned in Thari Mirwah, killing 6 passengers.

On 24 August 2014 a passenger bus traveling southbound from Punjab to Karachi collided at with a van traveling northbound to Thari Mirwah at Kot Lalu killing 10 passengers and injuring 11 others. All deceased were residents of Thari Mirwah.

On 25 March 2015, a Karachi-bound coach from Sadiqabad collided head-on with a Punjab-bound truck near Sui-Gas bus stop on the highway, resulting in the death of at least 16 people and injury of 20.

On 25 May 2018, seven people were killed and two injured due to high speed cars collision near Khairpur.

On 6 & 7 July 2018, at least 15 people were killed and 25 injured when a Punjab-bound coach from Karachi, a van and a car collided near Daur town.

On January 14, 2020 three local leaders of Jamaat-e-Islami were killed in a road accident due to heavy fog.

In another tragic incident, six people including five schoolchildren were crushed to death by a passenger van, on 29 March 2021, near Kot Lalu.

On May 21, 2022, three passengers were killed and several injured.

On 25 June 2023 two passenger coaches collided near Nawabshah resulting 7 people killed and 42 injured.

On April 10, 2025, three died in an accident between a passenger van and Vigo at Korundi. Seven people were killed and two injured on 24 May 2025.

== See also ==
- Provincial Highways of Sindh
- Transport in Pakistan
