= NA-208 Nawabshah-II =

Constituency of the National Assembly of Pakistan

- Constituency for the National Assembly of Pakistan
- Region: Sakrand and Daulatpur Tehsils and Daur Tehsil (partly) of Nawabshah District
- Electorate: 429,942

Current constituency
- Party: Pakistan People's Party
- Member: Syed Ghulam Mustafa Shah
- Created from: NA-214 Nawabshah-II

NA-208 Nawabshah-II (این اے-208، نوابشاه-2) is a constituency for the National Assembly of Pakistan.

== Assembly Segments ==
Constituency number	Constituency	District	Current MPA	Party
38	PS-38 Shaheed Benazirabad-III	Shaheed Benazirabad District	Ghulam Qadir Chandio	PPP
39	PS-39 Shaheed Benazirabad-IV	Shaheed Benazirabad District	Bahadur Khan Dahri	PPP

== Election 2002 ==
General elections were held on 10 October 2002. Azra Fazal of PPP won by 60,267 votes.

General election 2002: NA-214 Nawabshah-II
Party	Candidate	Votes	%	±%
PPP	Syed Ghulam Mustafa Shah	60,267	54.39	
NA	Mumtaz Ahmed Rahu	46,188	41.69	
Others	Others (six candidates)	4,347	3.92	
Turnout		113,556	37.13	
Total valid votes		110,802	97.58	
Rejected ballots		2,754	2.42	
Majority		14,079	12.70	
Registered electors		305,810		

== Election 2008 ==
General elections were held on 18 February 2008. Syed Ghulam Mustafa Shah of PPP won by 81,194 votes.

General election 2008: NA-214 Nawabshah-II
Party	Candidate	Votes	%	±%
PPP	Syed Ghulam Mustafa Shah	81,194	61.83	
PML(Q)	Khan Muhammad Dhari	47,075	35.85	
Others	Others (eight candidates)	3,052	2.32	
Turnout		136,020	48.06	
Total valid votes		131,321	96.55	
Rejected ballots		4,699	3.45	
Majority		34,119	25.98	
Registered electors		283,305		
PPP hold				

== Election 2013 ==
General elections were held on 11 May 2013. Syed Ghulam Mustafa Shah of PPP won by 135,502 votes and became the member of National Assembly.

General election 2013: NA-214 Nawabshah-II
Party	Candidate	Votes	%	±%
PPP	Syed Ghulam Mustafa Shah	135,502	77.77	
PML(N)	Ali Asghar Rind	25,687	14.74	
Others	Others (fourteen candidates)	13,054	7.49	
Turnout		181,723	61.84	
Total valid votes		174,243	95.88	
Rejected ballots		7,480	4.12	
Majority		109,815	63.03	
Registered electors		293,868		
PPP hold				

== Election 2018 ==
General elections were held on 25 July 2018.

General election 2018: NA-214 Nawabshah-II
Party	Candidate	Votes	%	±%
PPP	Syed Ghulam Mustafa Shah	110,921	58.99	
SUP	Syed Zain UI Abdin	54,697	29.09	
Independent	Syed Ghulam Ali Shah	5,031	2.68	
Independent	Ghulam Murtaza	4,975	2.65	
Independent	Falak Sher	3,113	1.66	
Independent	Bahadur Khan Dahri	2,139	1.14	
MMA	Wilayat Ali	1,937	1.03	
PML(N)	Mukhtiar Naz	1,303	0.69	
Independent	Ghulam Irtaza Umar	1,171	0.62	
PTI	Gul Muhammad Rind	1,061	0.56	
AAT	Nadeem Keerio	392	0.21	
Independent	Afshan lqbal	359	0.19	
Independent	Khan Muhammad Dahri	335	0.18	
Independent	Liaquat Ali	240	0.13	
Independent	Manthar Ali	178	0.09	
Independent	Sarfaraz Urf Babu	108	0.06	
Independent	Sardar Sher Muhammad Rind	88	0.05	
Turnout		199,251	55.84	
Total valid votes		188,048	94.38	
Rejected ballots		11,203	5.62	
Majority		56,224	29.90	
Registered electors		356,838		
PPP hold				

== Election 2024 ==
Elections were held on 8 February 2024. Syed Ghulam Mustafa Shah won the election with 127,181 votes.

General election 2024: NA-208 Nawabshah-II
Party	Candidate	Votes	%	±%
PPP	Syed Ghulam Mustafa Shah	127,181	61.37	▲2.38
GDA	Syed Zainulabdin	59,402	28.67	▼0.42^{†}
Others	Others (seventeen candidates)	20,639	9.96	
Turnout		219,282	51.00	▼4.84
Total valid votes		207,222	94.50	
Rejected ballots		12,060	5.50	
Majority		67,779	32.71	▲2.81
Registered electors		429,942		
PPP hold				

^{†} SUP contested as part of the GDA

== See also ==
- NA-207 Nawabshah-I
- NA-209 Sanghar-I
