= Kathri, Sindh =

Kathri
- Village
- ڪاٺڙي
- Location within Pakistan
- Coordinates: 26°27′30″N 68°19′09″E
- Country: Pakistan
- Province: Sindh

Population
  - Total: 80,000
  - Density: 10/km^{2} (26/sq mi)
- Time zone: UTC+5 (PST)
- Postal code: 67450
- Website: https://www.facebook.com/villageKathri/

Kathri (Sindhi: ڪاٺڙي) is a small village located in the Sindh province in the southern area of Pakistan, approximately 60 kilometers south of Sukkur. The village can be accessed by a single road connected to the nearby highway. The village spans about 2 square kilometers and consists of many medium-sized buildings. It is surrounded by grass fields to the west and desert to the east.

Approximately 2 kilometers west of Kathri lies the Nara Canal, which flows along the north-south highways towards Sanghar District in the south and empties into the Indus River in the north.

Khatri Road is the only road leading to the village and is connected to Nara Road in the east and Canal Road in the west.

== See also ==
- Nawabshah
- Kazi Ahmed
- Dour
- Bandhi
