= Kazi Ahmed Taluka =

Qazi Ahmed قاضی احمد
- Town
- Location within Sindh Location within Pakistan
- Coordinates: 26°24′30″N 68°09′23″E
- Country: Pakistan
- Province: Sindh
- Division: Shaheed Benazir Abad
- District: Nawabshah District
- Taluka Status: 14 Nov 1989
- Elevation: 25 m (82 ft)

Population (2017)
  - City: 24,305
- Time zone: UTC+5 (PST)
- Calling code: 0244

Kazi Ahmed also Qazi Ahmed, is a town in Shaheed Benazir Abad District (formerly Nawabshah), Sindh province, Pakistan. The town lies on the National Highway between Moro and Sakrand cities. After the construction of Amri Bridge, Kazi Ahmed has become a commercial hub for locals.

The town is named after Qazi Ahmad Dimmai (Qudus Sarhu), an 18th-century Sufi saint who settled in the area and whose shrine is in the town as well.

== History ==
The current town and Headquarter of Qazi Ahmed taluka was the part of Sakrand Taluka and Daulatpur was the part of Moro taluka before 1989.

In 14 Nov 1989, On the bifurcation of Nawabshah District to the Creation of Naushahro Feroze district some areas of Moro taluka (Daulatpur town) and some areas of Sakrand Taluka (Qazi Ahmed town) merged to created a new Daulatpur Taluka (HQ Daulatpur Town) but in 22 Oct 2009 Taluka renamed and Headquarter also shifted to Qazi Ahmed.

== Geography ==
Summertime highs might be as high as 51 degrees Celsius. Additionally, a variety of crops are grown in the agricultural territory that surrounds the town. Sugarcane, wheat, rice, and cotton are some of these crops.

== Transportation ==
- N-5 National Highway (kilometre marker 275).
- Nawabshah to Kazi Ahmed Road.
- Qazi Ahmed to Daur
- Qazi Ahmed to Lakhat
- Qazi Ahmed to Aamri Bridge
