= Peoples Bus Service =

Public bus service by the Government of Sindh

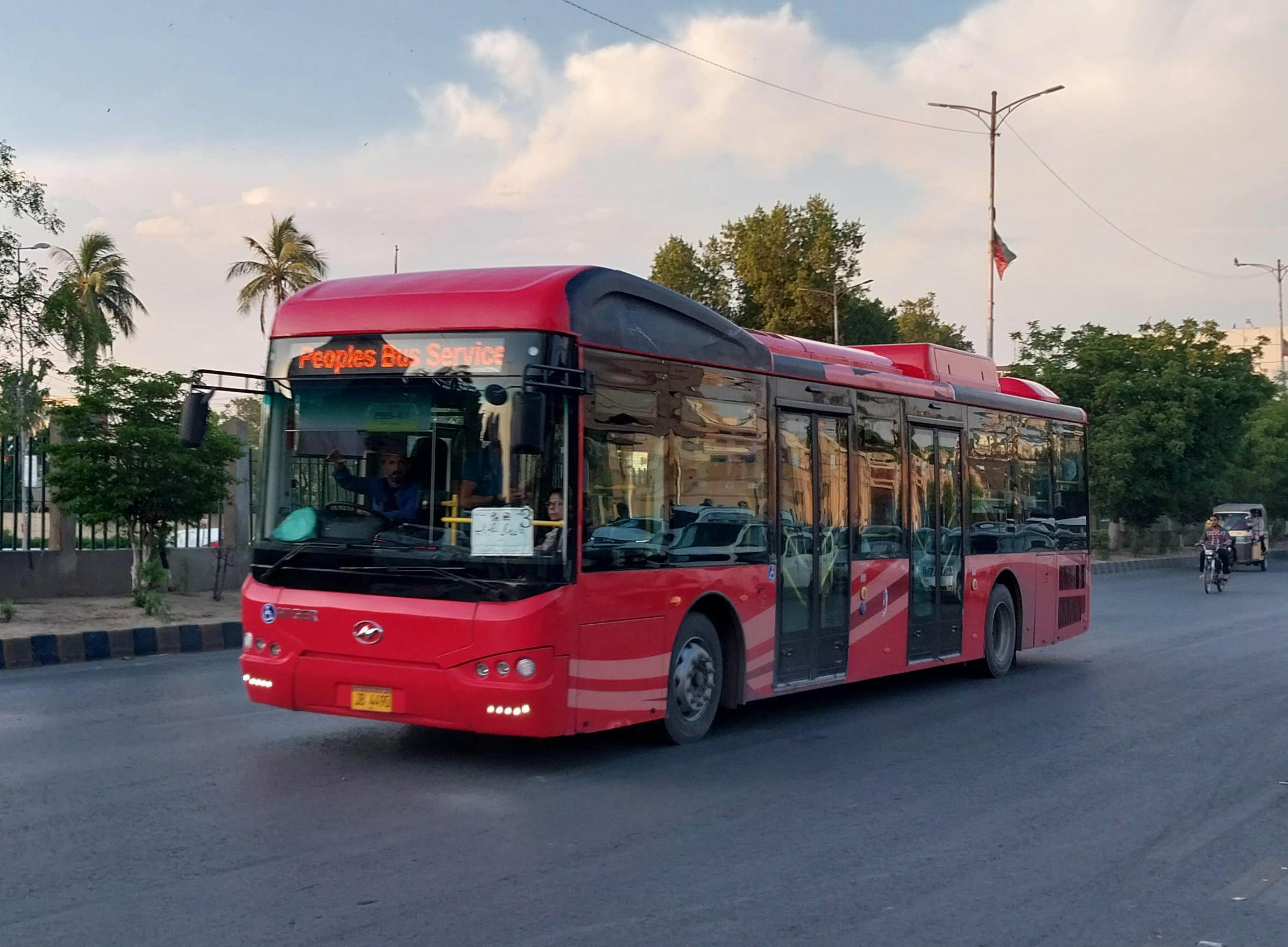

Overview
- Owner: Government of Sindh
- Locale: Sindh: Karachi; Hyderabad; Sukkur; Larkana; Nawabshah; Mirpur Khas
- Transit type: Public bus service
- Number of lines: 11

Operation
- Began operation: 27 June 2022
- Operator: National Radio & Telecommunication Corporation (NRTC)

Peoples Bus Service, formally known as the Sindh Intra-District Peoples Bus Service Project is a public bus service by the Government of Sindh operating in Karachi, Hyderabad, Sukkur, Larkana, Mirpurkhas, and Nawabshah.

== History ==
It was inaugurated on 27 June 2022. The buses will operate from 8 A.M to 8 P.M. Fares for the transportation are between PKR 50–100, due to ongoing inflation a change to fares were proposed however were rejected.

=== Development ===
240 buses ran on seven different routes in Karachi. In the first phase, the bus ran from the confluence of Model Colony and Tank Chowk at Malir Cantt to Shahrah-e-Faisal, Metropole and II Chundrigar Road Tower.

In January 2023, the government of Sindh announced the Pink-bus, a modification of the bus service which was aimed to be women-only. Electric-buses are also proposed for the Bus Service however as of now they will be operational in Karachi.

Currently there is an expansion programme announced by the government to add additional 60 buses. and to improve availability a mobile application is planned.

== Routes ==
=== Karachi ===
Active routes of PBS in Karachi as of April 2023

As of April 2023, eleven routes have been outlined for the bus service in Karachi.

Route no.	Add on	Start point	End point
1	Normal	Model Colony	Dockyard
1	Pink^{*}	Tank Chowk	KPT Interchange
2	Normal	North Karachi	Landhi
2	Pink	North Karachi	Landhi
3	Normal	UP More	Korangi
4	Normal	Power House Chowrangi	KPT Interchange
9	Normal	Gulshan e Hadeed	KPT Interchange
10	Normal	Numaish Chowrangi	Ibrahim Hyderi
10	Pink	Numaish Chowrangi	Ibrahim Hyderi
11	Normal	Ziauddin Chowrangi Clifton	Miran Nakka Lyari
EV-1 (12)	Normal	Malir Cantonment	Sea View
EV-2	Normal	CMH Malir Cantonment	Dolmen Mall Clifton
EV-3	Normal	Bahria Town	Malir Halt

^{*}R-1 (Pink) is the eight route outlined for the PBS in Karachi and is the first women-only bus service in Pakistan.

=== Hyderabad ===
1 route operates in Hyderabad.

Route no.	Add on	Start point	End point
1	Normal	Hyder Chowk	Hatri
2	Pink	In Development	

=== Larkana ===
1 route operates in Larkana.

Route no.	Add on	Start point	End point
1	Normal	New Bus Stand	QUES Stop

=== Sukkur ===
Started on 15 Feb 2023.

1 route operates in Sukkur.

Route no.	Add on	Start point	End point
1	Normal	Rohri stop	Globe Chowk(bunder road )

=== Mirpurkhas ===
Started on 20 April 2024.

1 route operates in Mirpurkhas.

Route no.	Add on	Start point	End point
1	Normal	Bus Stand stop	Teen Talwar Chowk (Jarwari Shakh )

=== Nawabshah ===
Started on 04 July 2024. 1 route operates in Benazirabad.

Route no.	Add on	Start point	Via	End point
1	Normal	Cinema Chowk (Sakrand City)	Zero point, SBBU Chowk, RT Chowk, Quest Road Board Office Quaid-e-Azam Road, & Nadra Chowk	Jam sahib Chowk (Teen water)
2	Normal	RT Chowk (Zero Point)	Zero point, GT Rd, Rangers Pump, Benazir School, Stadium Rd, Nawabshah Mall, Bilawal Chowk, Bilawal Stadium, & SP Chowk,	Syed G.M Chowk (Airport Police Station)

=== Khairpur ===
Started on 13 May 2026, inaugurated by Sharjeel Inam Memon

Route No	Add on	Start point	via	End point
1	Normal	New Bus Terminal Khairpur, Old National Highway, Khairpur Mirs	Sukkur Barrage,Globe Chowk, Lab-e-Mehran	Rohri Railway Station
2	Normal	New Bus Terminal Khairpur, Old National Highway, Khairpur Mirs	Shah Abdul Latif University, Kot Dijji, Kumb	Ranipur

== See also ==
- Karachi Breeze
- Karachi Circular Railway
