= Pai Forest =

Coordinates: 26°05′58″N 68°14′50″E

The Pai Forest (Sindhi: پئي ٻيلو) is an arid and riverine forest situated on the left bank of Indus in Sakrand town of Shaheed Benzirabad district, Sindh, Pakistan. It has rich flora and fauna and is home to diverse wildlife, but it's threatened by land grabbers and scarcity of water. It is a protected forest which spread over 4777 acres of land. It is watered through Rahib Shah Minor Canal, a subsidiary of Rohri canal.

122 flora species were found at Pai forest.
