= Budhal Khan Shar =

Village in Pakistan

Coordinates: 27°06′N 68°36′E

Budhal Khan Shar is a village which is 0.8 km from Hindyari, Pakistan.
