= Mengho Fakir Shar =

Mengho Fakir Shar مینگھو فقیر شر is a village of Thari Mirwah Tehsil in Khairpur District. The village is named after the poet Mengho Fakir Shar, who was the son of Mystic poet Ghulam Hyder Godrya Fakir. The village is 60km south of the district headquarters, Khairpur, and approximately 430km north of Karachi.

== Demographics ==
The population of the village, according to 2017 census was 8,639.
