= Sahib Khan Jamali =

Village Sahib Khan Jamali ڳوٺ صاحب خان جمالي Hajian jo Goth حاجين جو ڳوٺ
- village
- Nickname: Village Sahib Khan Jamali ڳوٺ صاحب خان جمالي
- Interactive map of Village Sahib Khan Jamali ڳوٺ صاحب خان جمالي
- Coordinates: 26°8′0″N 68°25′0″E
- Country: Pakistan
- Village Sahib Khan Jamali: 1850s
- Founder: Mr Haji Sahib Khan Jamali
- Named for: Mr Haji Sahib Khan jamali

Area
  - Total: 2 km^{2} (0.77 sq mi)
  - Land: 2 km^{2} (0.77 sq mi)
  - Water: 0 km^{2} (0 sq mi) 0%
- Elevation: 15 m (49 ft)

Population (2023)
  - Estimate (2023): 4,000
  - Density: 1,000/km^{2} (2,600/sq mi)
- Time zone: UTC+5 (PST)
- Pakistan Post Code: 67450
- PTCL: 0244
- Website: https://www.facebook.com/MyVillageSahibKhanJamali/

Village Sahib Khan Jamali ڳوٺ صاحب خان جمالي Sakrand Sindh Pakistan is a historical and well-known village of UC Karam Jamali, Deh Mori, Talko Sakrand, Shaheed Benazir Abad District, Pakistan with a population of more than 4000 people. It was named after "Mr Sahib Khan Jamali" who built it. It is about 14 km away from Nawabshah to the South.It is approximately 150 years old. The main profession of the peoples of this village is proprietor business, farming and real estate. Languages spoken by residents are Sindhi سنڌي and Balochi بلوچي. Village Sahib Khan Jamali is one of the most modern and prospering villages of Shaheed Benazirabad District. The area near the village is cultivated through modern agriculture machines. The village has few government schools to provide primary education to the children, but for higher education they are dependent on the nearest village of Wassayo Jamali to get high school education. More than 30% of young population is well educated with masters or Bachelor's degrees and serving in different public and private sectors.And from the remainings 40% are graduated at high school level. Moreover, 20% are educated at primary level. The remaining 10% does not have any certificatation (although they have some knowledge of reading and writing). The village has one animal hospital, but working for Dispensary and water treatment plants. The main source of electricity is the renewable energy which comes from Solar Panels placed on the roofs of buildings. Cricket is the favorite sport of villagers, they play and participate in the cricket tournaments. But, they are well aware of other sports.
