= Nasrat Canal =

Irrigation system in Pakistan

- Interactive map of Nasrat Canal

History
- Date of first use: 1923

Geography
- Start point: Rohri Canal near Sukkur
- End point: Districts of Sukkur, Khairpur, Naushero, and Shaheed Benazirabad

The Nasrat Canal (often transliterated as Nusrat Canal) also locally known as Sada Wah, is a major irrigation canal located in the Sindh province of Pakistan. It originates from the Rohri Canal near Sukkur and flows southward for approximately 260 kilometers, irrigating vast agricultural lands in the districts of Sukkur, Khairpur, Naushero, and Shaheed Benazirabad.

== History and significance ==
Construction of the Nasrat Canal began in the early 20th century under the British Raj and was completed in 1923. It played a crucial role in transforming the arid landscape of Sindh into a fertile agricultural region. The canal serves as a vital source of water for various crops, including cotton, wheat, rice, sugarcane, and fruits.
