= Bakhtawar Cadet College For Girls Shaheed Benazirabad =

Girls College in Pakistan

Coordinates: 26.198°N 68.409°E

Bakhtawar Cadet College

Location
- Cadet College Road, Aliabad; Shaheed Benazirabad, Sindh, Pakistan

Information
- Established: 11 Oct 2010
- Founders: President Asif Ali Zardari
- School board: Board of Intermediate and Secondary Education Shaheed Benazirabad
- Area: 100 acres
- Colour: Blue
- Demonym: BAKHTAWARIANS
- Houses: 6
- Website: https://www.bccg.edu.pk/

Bakhtawar Cadet College for Girls, in Shaheed Benazirabad, Sindh, is the first girls' cadet college in Pakistan. Founded in 2010, it is jointly run by the Government of Sindh and the Pakistan Air Force. The cadet college was established in 2010 and is named after Mai Bakhtawar Lashari Shaheed, the first woman to die in the history of peasant uprisings in Sindh in 1947.

Bakhtawar Cadet College for Girls is situated on 100 acres of land. Classes started in 2017.

== Location ==
Bakhtawar Cadet College for Girls is situated approximately 260km up north from Karachi, about 4km from the outskirts of Shaheed Benazirabad (previously known as Nawabshah District), Sindh, Pakistan.
