= Municipal Corporation Shaheed Benazirabad =

Local governing body in Benzirabad, Pakistan

Municipal Corporation Shaheed Benazirabad بلدیہ اعلی شہید بینظیر آباد

Leadership
- Mayor: M Rasheed Bhatti, PPP since 20 June 2023
- Deputy Mayor: Mubashir Arain, PPP since 20 June 2023
- Seats: 143

Elections
- Last election: 2022

Municipal Corporation Shaheed Benazirabad (Sindhi: شہید بینظیر آباد ميونسپلٽي, Urdu: بلدیہ اعلی شہید بینظیر آباد abbreviated as MCSBA) is a public corporation and the governing body of Benazirabad city and Nawabshah Talukas, the fifth-largest city in Sindh, Pakistan.

The corporation has 19 reserved seats and 12 ordinary seats. It was declared inoperative by Sindh Local Ordinance of 2001.

The 31 elected Union Committee members choose the mayor and deputy mayor.

MCSBA is made up of 60 Union Councils in Old Nawabshah Town Municipal Corporation and H.M Khoja Town Municipal Corporation of Benazirabad City.

Both the mayor and deputy mayor are members of Pakistan People's Party.

== Benazirabad Local Elections ==
=== Election 2022 ===
Benazirabad Municipal Elections 2022
Party		H.M Khoja Town Municipal Corporation	Old Nawabshah Municipal Corporation	MCSBA	Percentage %
1	Pakistan Peoples Party	8	8	16	84.2%
2	Grand Democratic Alliance	1	1	2	10.5%
3	Independents	1	-	1	5.2%
Total		10	9	19	100%
Votes Polled		351,253			50%
Total Votes		700,666			100%

They took oath on June 20, 2022.
