= Hyder Chowk Hyderabad =

Place of political, social and religious importance in Hyderabad, Pakistan

Hyder Chowk (also called Dua Chowk) is an intersection in the heart of Hyderabad, Sindh. It was named after Hyder Bux Jatoi, a revolutionary leftist, peasant leader, and the pioneer of Hari movement.

== History ==
Formerly, Hyder Chowk was a bus stop near a number of offices for political parties, including Sindh Hari Committee, National Awami Party, and Sindhi Awami Tahreek A number of trade unions like thePakistan Workers Federation and Sindh Peoples Labour Federation, and student organisations like the Sindh National Students Federation, also had their offices here. Its vast space and vicinity to the railway station and bus stand favoured these offices to function efficiently and thus welcomed the gradual transformation of the area into a social and religious hub as well.

The chowk was formerly called Fawaara Chowk (Fountain Square), after a former fountain in the area. Later, Gol Park was established, which became a public attraction and a hotspot for political parties to organize and deliver speeches. The park then became a bus stand connecting routes from Mirpurkhas to Hyderabad and vice versa. Later, Hyderabad Municipal Corporation installed a sculpture of praying hands and soon the chowk became popularly known as Dua Chowk. Its current name honours revolutionary personality and leader Hyder Bux Jatoi, who had his residence nearby.

== Location ==
Hyder Chowk is a junction of four different pathways. The first leads to Gul Centre Shopping Mall and Dr. NA Baloch Model School, the second leads to Resham Bazar, the third to Railway Station via Gari Khata and Naya Pul, and fourth and the last leading to Gol Building and Kokhar Mohalla. Owing to its vast area and ease of transportation, the chowk is a common location for religious rallies, such as those held in Muharram.

The chowk has also developed into a place of economical, educational and judicial importance with large amount of dealings taking place at the main branch of National Bank of Pakistan, sale and resale of books at various local shops such as the historical City Book Depot, and the colony of advocates in addition to the Hyderabad Press Club, Deputy Commissioner House and District Court respectively. The area also is home to bazaars, sweet shops, automobile workshops, hotels, and printing shops.
