= Haji Jalal Din Shar =

Haji Jalal Din Shar is a village in the Union Council of Hindyari, tehsil Thari Mirwah. It is located at a distance of 5.6 km from the city of Thari Mirwah with a population of approximately 180 people. There are two primary schools for the education of boys and girls separately.
