= Nasrat Tehsil =

Nasrat Taluka تعلقہ نصرت نصرت تعلقو
- Taluka (Tehsil)
- Interactive map of Nasrat Taluka
- Coordinates (26.458333°N 68.319167°E): 26°14′39″N 68°24′36″E
- Country: British Raj
- Province: Bombay Presidency
- Division: Sind Division
- District: Hyderabad District
- Taluka Status: 1903

Population
  - Urban: 363,138 (75.34%)
  - Rural: 118,840 (24.66%)
- Time zone: UTC+5 (PKT)
- Postal code: 67450

Nasrat Tehsil is a historical administrative region located in the Hyderabad District of Sind Division, which was part of the Bombay Presidency during British rule in India.

== History ==
Nasrat Tehsil was created during the British colonial period as part of the Hyderabad District in Sind Division. Initially, the region was part of the Sind Division and played a significant role in the agricultural and administrative setup of the area. The economy of Nasrat Tehsil during the British period was primarily based on agriculture, with local crops and trade routes being vital for the region's development.

In 1903, Nasrat Tehsil was carved out of the larger Shadadpur and Sakrand Tehsils. This restructuring allowed for better administrative oversight and facilitated more localized governance.

In 1907, the Tehsil was renamed Nawabshah in honor of a local land owner, Syed Nawab Ali Shah, who donated 200 acres of land to the government. This land was designated for the establishment of a town and a railway station when the British colonial government constructed the Hyderabad-Rohri railway line. Nawab Ali Shah donated another 50 acres for government offices. In recognition of this generous contribution, the British government renamed the Tehsil to Nawabshah.

On 1 November 1912, Nawabshah was upgraded to District status, separating it from Hyderabad District, further solidifying its administrative importance in the region.

== Geography ==
Nasrat Tehsil is located in the central part of the Hyderabad District. The region is characterized by its fertile land and proximity to key trade routes, which made it an important area for agricultural production during the British colonial period.

== Demographics ==
The population of Nasrat Tehsil in the 19th century was diverse, consisting of various ethnic groups, including Sindhi Muslims, Hindus, and other minorities. The local economy revolved around agriculture, with communities often involved in the cultivation of cotton, wheat, and rice.

== Administration ==
During the British colonial era, Nasrat Tehsil was administered under the Hyderabad District's jurisdiction, and its role in the Bombay Presidency was primarily focused on land management and tax collection. The area was also known for its role in the region's settlement and revision surveys during the British administration.

== See also ==
- Hyderabad District (Sindh)
- Bombay Presidency
- History of Sindh
