= Dubbi =

Dubbi is a village located in Khairpur District, Sindh, Pakistan. It borders on the Thar Desert, adjacent to Mirwah Taluka and Nara Taluka. It has a population of 1750 people.

== History ==
"Dubbi" means a small pond of water. Location of Village is 1.5 Kilometers away from Old Indus River Passage. In earlier days of 16th century here was a pond of water where people come to take water, animals also take water from this pond. These days that pond is not available but people have made their houses there in the middle of 19th century. People migrated from nearest fields to the bank of these sandy areas to cope the rains and breaches of Mirwah canal.
