= Sirnikot =

Archaeological sit ein Pakistan

Sirnikot (Urdu: سرنی کوٹ, Sindhi: سرڻي ڪوٽ) is a Buddhist archaeological site situated along the left bank of the Indus River in Sindh, Pakistan.

== Location ==
Sirnikot is located in deh Sadhoja, near New Jatoi town in Taluka Moro, Naushahro Feroze District of Sindh.

== Construction ==
The construction of the Sirnikot Fort seems to be a continuation of late Bronze Age of Harappa architecture built with baked bricks and clay or mud adopted in later periods. There is a stupa close to the fort, constructed from unbaked bricks. The stupa is on a mound and has a staircase leading to the top. Terracotta elephant faces, terracotta balls, and carved bricks with floral and leaf designs were found from here. The height of the stupa is 70 feet (21 m). The walls of Sirnikot are 10 feet (3.0 m) high and it is spread over an area of five acres (2.0 ha). The Sirnikot site belongs to Buddhism which spread to Sindh during the empire of Ashoka the Great.
