= Mai Bakhtawar =

Peasant in colonial-era Sindh

Mai Bakhtawar Lashari Baloch
- Sindhi: مائي بختاور لاشاري
- Born: 1880; Tando Bago, Badin District, Sindh, British India (now Pakistan)
- Died: 22 June 1947 (aged 67); Dodo Khan Sargani, British India (now Pakistan)
- Occupation: Peasant
- Known for: Courage against injustice
- Movement: Hari Movement
- Spouse: Wali Mohammad Lashari
- Children: 4

Mai Bakhtawar Lashari Baloch (Sindhi: مائي بختاور لاشاري) was a farm worker who was murdered during a landlord and peasants' confrontation during British Rule in India. She was killed in Rural Sindh, British India.

== Life ==
She was the only child of Murad Khan Lashari, who named her Mai Bakhtawar, meaning 'fortunate woman' or 'lucky woman'. In 1898, Mai Bakhtawar married Wali Mohammad Lashari, who worked as a peasant in the lands of a landed aristocrat. The couple had four children: Dost Mohammad Khan, Lal Bakhsh, Mohammad Siddique and daughter Rasti. She is remembered as a courageous woman who consistently stood up against injustice throughout her life. Some political agitators have posthumously invoked her legacy, portraying her as a "daughter of the soil" and a heroic figure for the Sindhi cause, using her story to further their own agendas.

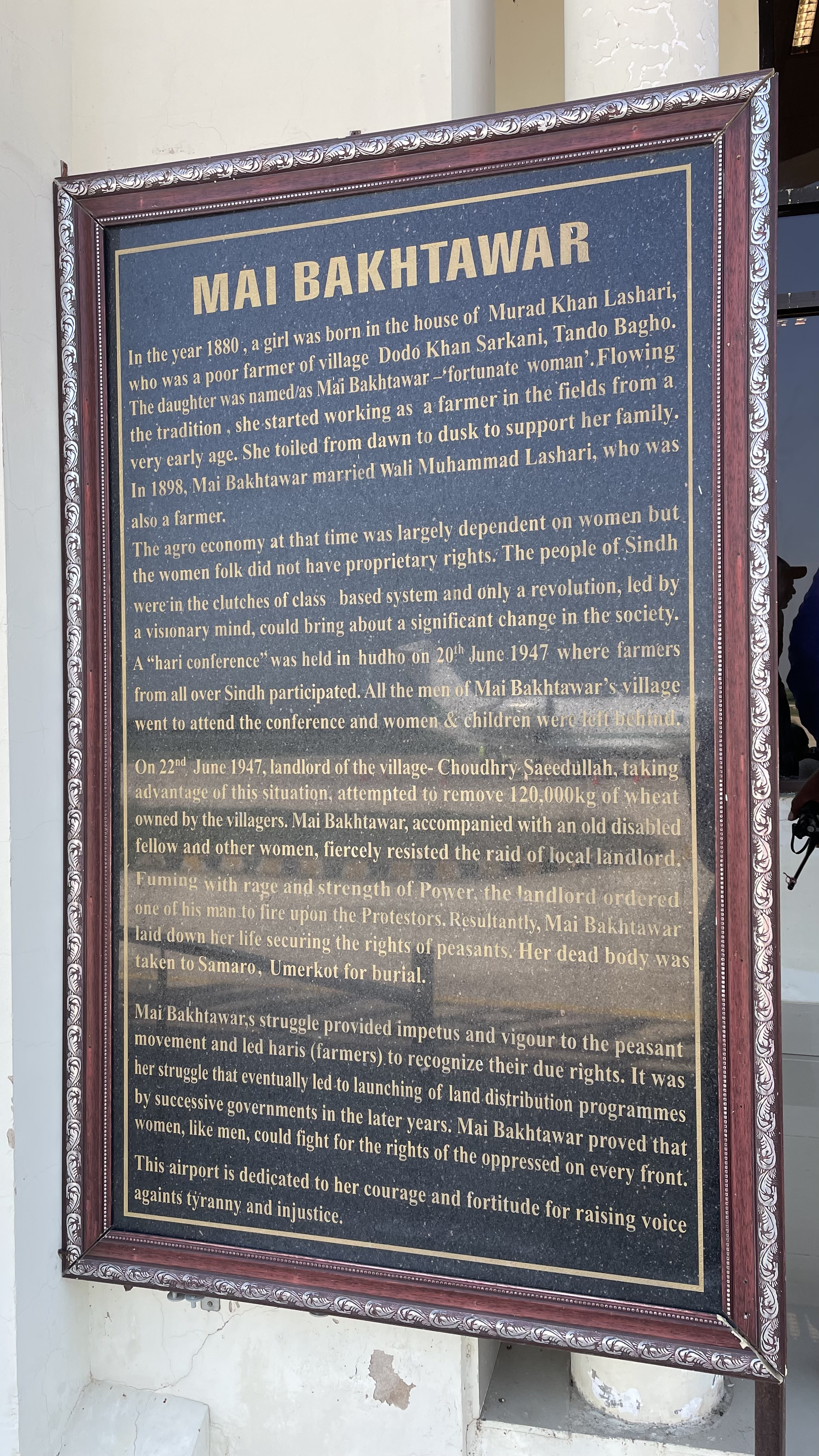
Information board about Mai Bakhtawar's life at the airport near Islamkot

== Background ==
In rural Sindh during the 1940s, over 80% of cultivated land was owned by large landlords, known as Zamindars. Haris (tenant farmers) worked the land in exchange for a share of the harvest, primarily wheat, or a portion of the revenue from crops like cotton. Mai Bakhtawar’s village was part of an estate covering 40,000 acres. It was common practice at the time for landlords to arrive with armed men during the harvest, seizing the majority of the yield and leaving only a small portion for the peasants.

To address the widespread and deeply rooted poverty caused by the stark divide in land ownership, the Sindh Government commissioned the Hari Committee of Enquiry in March 1947 to review tenancy rights and explore agrarian reform in the province. Although the report was released after the creation of Pakistan, it recommended against abolishing the zamindar system. (Note: Unlike in several Indian states, where abolition was implemented with varying degrees of success after 1947.) Instead, the committee proposed reforms to ensure that peasants received their full share of produce from landlords and were granted security of tenure.

Another organisation dedicated to empowering peasants was the Sindh Hari Committee, founded in 1930 in Mirpurkhas. Its primary goal was to secure land ownership rights for peasants. After World War II, which further deepened poverty in Sindh, Hyder Bux Jatoi emerged as a central figure in the committee. From the 1940s into the following decade, he played a crucial role in shaping the province's agrarian reform debates. In the tense post-war climate, amid growing nationalist pressure, the campaign to reform the batai (sharecropping) system - known as the Adh Bateyo Movement - was revived in 1946. On 20 - 22 June 1947, Hyder Bux Jatoi's advocacy movement held a gathering in Judho, just 10 kilometres from Mai Bakhtawar's village, Dodo Khan Sargani.

== Murder ==
The movement gained momentum, leading to regular clashes between peasants and landlords in Sindh. On 22 June 1949, while most of Mai Bakhtawar's village men and many women attended a nearby Hari conference in Jhudo, the landlord, Choudhry Saeedullah, attempted to exploit their absence. Accompanied by armed men, he entered the village to seize the entire crop yield. It was then that Mai Bakhtawar courageously confronted them, refusing to allow their theft. Defying the landlord and his men, she physically stood her ground, a bold act in an era and region where even men were often too fearful to challenge the landlords for their rights.

It is unclear whether Mai Bakhtawar used the famous Sindhi slogan of Sufi Shah Inayat, 'Jeko Khede So Khaey' (He who tills has the right to eat), or something else. What is clear, however, is that her bold resistance deeply angered the armed men accompanying the landlord. In a tragic turn, their fury culminated in them fatally shooting her. (Note: In retrospect, many believed Mai Bakhtawar was killed by a "Punjabi zamindar," owing to landlord Saeedullah's family connections. This incident is also viewed within the broader context of labor recruitment from outside the province, primarily from Punjab, and the influx of landless East Punjabi refugees in early 1948.)

Her body was taken to Samaro for postmortem rites and was buried there.

== Impact ==
The struggle of the Hari movement captured the public's imagination, particularly after the death of Mai Bakhtawar, who bravely fought against the powerful landed elite for her rights as a sharecropper. Her killers, Saeedullah (Note: He was the nephew of Pakistan's then foreign minister Muhammad Zafarullah Khan.) and his men, were sentenced to 20 years in prison for her murder. Mai Bakhtawar became the first woman to die in the history of peasant uprisings in Sindh. Her death had a profound impact, inspiring the eventual passage of the Sind Tenancy Act. (Note: The Act was passed by the Sindh Assembly on 4 April 1950, and signed into law by the Governor on 11 May 1950. It mandated that landlords allocate half of the harvest to the farmers, ensuring a more equitable share of the yield for the peasants.)

The murder, occurring amidst the broader movement, drew significant attention to the plight of Sindh's peasants, particularly from urban areas like Karachi, raising awareness of the injustices faced by rural communities.

== Places named in honour of Mai Bakhtawar ==
- Mai Bakhtawar International Airport in Islamkot was named after Mai Bakhtawar
- First cadet college for girls in Shaheed Benazirabad was also named after Mai Bakhtawar.
- Government of Sindh has named Bakhtawar on concerned Union Council of Kunri Taluka
- Two schools are also named after her.
- Government and non government organizations are awarding their best performance awards on the name of Mai Bakhatawar Lashari Shaheed.
