= Nawabshah Tehsil =

Nawabshah Taluka تعلقہ نوابشاھ نواب شاھ تعلقو
- Taluka (Tehsil)
- Location within Sindh Location within Pakistan
- Coordinates (26.458333°N 68.319167°E): 26°14′39″N 68°24′36″E
- Country: Pakistan
- Province: Sindh
- Division: Shaheed Benazir Abad
- District: Nawabshah District
- Taluka Status: 1903

Government
  - Type: Municipal Corporation
  - Mayor: Abdul Rasheed Bhatti
  - Deputy Mayor: Ahmed Arain

Area
  - Tehsil: 435 km^{2} (168 sq mi)

Population (2023)
  - Tehsil: 481,978
  - Density: 1,110/km^{2} (2,870/sq mi)
  - Urban: 363,138 (75.34%)
  - Rural: 118,840 (24.66%)
- Time zone: UTC+5 (PKT)
- Postal code: 67450

Nawabshah is a tehsil of Shaheed Benazir Abad District (Nawabshah), Sindh, Pakistan. Nawabshah Tehsil (known as Nasrat Tehsil from 1903 to 1907) was established in 1903 by the British government. The tehsil was a part of Hyderabad district (1903 - 1912). On 1 November 1912, Nawabshah was upgraded to a district status of Sind Division.

In 1909, Syed Nawab Ali Shah donated 200 acres of land to British government for construction of a town railway station and 60 acres of land for construction of buildings of district and taluka offices free of cost. To commemorate this, the British government then changed the name of Nasrat town to Nawabshah town.

== Demographics ==
=== Population ===
Historical population
Year	Pop.	±% p.a.
1951	118,906	—
1961	175,054	+3.94%
1972	302,824	+5.11%
1981	383,060	+2.65%
1998	576,653	+2.44%
2017	413,402	−1.74%
2023	481,978	+2.59%

According to 2023 census, Nawabshah Tehsil had a population of 481,978.

== History ==
Nawabshah Taluka was known as Nasrat Taluka of Hyderabad District before 1909. The name was derived from Nasrat Canal that flows in the taluka but in 1909, the taluka was renamed to Syed Nawab Shah ^{(now Nawabshah)}.
