= Sakrand Junction railway station =

Railway station in Sindh, Pakistan

Sakrand Junction railway station سڪرنڊ جنڪشن ريلوي اسٽيشن

General information
- Owner: Ministry of Railways

Other information
- Station code: SKRD

History
- Former names: Great Indian Peninsula Railway

Sakrand Junction railway station (Urdu: سکرنڈ جنکشن ریلوے اسٹیشن, Sindhi: سڪرنڊ جنڪشن ريلوي اسٽيشن) is located in Sakrand Town, District Shahid Benazirabad, Sindh, Pakistan.

== See also ==
- List of railway stations in Pakistan
- Pakistan Railways
