= ASSL Air =

Private, charter airline in Pakistan

Aircraft Sales & Services Pvt. Airlines
IATA	ICAO	Call sign
none	ACS	AIRCRAFT SALES
- Founded: 1976
- Hubs: Jinnah International Airport
- Fleet size: 4
- Destinations: Unscheduled
- Parent company: Aircraft Sales & Services

Aircraft Sales & Services Pvt., or known as ASSL Air, is a private, charter airline in Pakistan. Its main hub is Jinnah International Airport. It is Pakistan's oldest private airline.

Most of the airline's flights are charters to Balochistan or Mai Bakhtawar International Airport.

== Fleet ==
Aircraft	In service	Notes and Refs.
Bombardier Challenger 605	1	
Beechcraft 1900D	1	
DHC-6-400 Twin Otter	1	
Cessna 208 Caravan	1	
