= Nuclear Medicine Oncology & Radiotherapy Institute Nawabshah =

Cancer hospital in Pakistan

The Nuclear Medicine Oncology & Radiotherapy Institute Nawabshah (NORIN), also referred to as the NORIN Cancer Hospital Nawabshah, is a healthcare facility in the Shaheed Benazirabad District, Sindh, Pakistan. It focuses on diagnosis, treatment, and research related to cancer, covering a population of about 3 million people across the Sindh province districts of Shaheed Benazirabad, Sanghar, Naushahro Feroze, Dadu and Matiari.

This institute was inaugurated, on 17 November 2012, by Azra Fazal Peechoho, a member of National Assembly of Pakistan and a sister of Benazir Bhutto's spouse Asif Ali Zardari.

== Background ==
It was established by the Pakistan Atomic Energy Commission (PAEC) with the objective of providing advanced cancer care to the rural areas of Sindh. It began functioning in January 2012, offering radiotherapy services and aiming to adopt the latest advancements in research for effective cancer management.
