= Sindh Act, 2011 =

Pakistani local legislation

Sindh (Repeal of the Sindh Local Government Ordinance, 2001 and Revival of the Sindh Local Government Ordinance, 1979) Act, 2011

Sindh Assembly
- Long title: An Act to repeal the Sindh Local Government Ordinance, 2001 (Ordinance No.XXVII of 2001) and revive the Sindh Local Government Ordinance, 1979 (Ordinance No.XII of 1979)
- Citation: Act No. XXIV of 2011, No. PAS/Legis-B-25/2011
- Territorial extent: Whole of Sindh except cantonments
- Passed by: Provincial Assembly of Sindh
- Passed: July 13th, 2011
- Assented to: July 14th, 2011

Repeals
- Sindh Local Government Ordinance, 2001

The Sindh (Repeal of the Sindh Local Government Ordinance, 2001 and Revival of the Sindh Local Government Ordinance, 1979) Act, 2011 was an act passed by the Provincial Assembly of Sindh on July 13, 2011 and assented to by the Acting Governor of Sindh, Nisar Ahmed Khuhro, on July 14, 2011. The act repealed the Sindh Local Government Ordinance, 2001 and restored the Sindh Local Government Ordinance, 1979. The act restored the tiers of government outlined in the 1979 ordinance: City Government Karachi, District Government, Town/Taluka Municipal Administration, and Union Administration.

Acting Governor Khuhro stated that the Sindh Local Government Ordinance, 2001 had been introduced by former president Pervez Musharraf without the consent of the people and that no amendment could be made without Musharraf's approval.

The act was one of three key bills passed on the same day which were met vocal opposition from MQM lawmakers. The Acting Governor ignored the demands of MQM lawmakers.

Moulvi Iqbal Haider, advocate general of Sindh, filed a petition challenging the act stating that the Sindh Local Government Ordinance of 1979 couldn't be revived without amending the Constitution of Pakistan.

== See also ==
- Sindh Local Government Ordinance, 2001
- Sindh Local Government Ordinance, 1979
- The Sindh Local Government Act, 2013
