= Quaid-e-Azam Law College Nawabshah =

Government law college in Sindh, Pakistan

Quaid-e-Azam Law College
- Type: Government
- Established: 1998
- Accreditation: Pakistan Bar Council
- Academic affiliations: University of Sindh
- Location: Shaheed Benazirabad, Sindh, Pakistan; 26.2513°N 68.4135°E
- Mascot: Qlcians
- Website: qlc.edu.pk
- Location in Sindh Quaid-e-Azam Law College Nawabshah (Pakistan)

The Quaid-e-Azam Law College (QLC) is a public law college located in Nawabshah, Sindh, Pakistan. It is the first Government sector law college in Shaheed Benazirabad (formally Nawabshah) region.

QLC is affiliated with University of the Sindh. The college offers LLB degree which is accredited by Pakistan Bar Council. QLC was established in 1998. The college started classes in the APWA girls public school Kacheri Road. The Sindh government later approved a new site for the college. In 2012, the college was shifted to its new location.

== Location ==
Opposite Farsi Bagh, Syed Colony, Quaid-e-Azam Road, Nawabshah, Shaheed Benazirabad, Sindh 67450.
