= Rohri Canal =

Irrigation system in Pakistan

- Interactive map of Rohri Canal

Geography
- Start point: Sukkur Barrage near Rohri
- End point: Districts of Sukkur, Khairpur, Naushero, Shaheed Benazirabad, Matiari, Hyderabad, Sanghar and Badin

Rohri Canal is a major irrigation canal in Sindh, Pakistan. It is a vital source of water for agriculture in the region. It originates from the left bank of the Indus River at the Sukkur Barrage, located in Sukkur District, Sindh. It traverses through several districts, providing irrigation to vast agricultural lands. The canal's primary flow is towards the south, irrigating districts including Sukkur, Khairpur, Naushahro Feroze, Shaheed Benazirabad, Matiari, Hyderabad, Sanghar and Badin.

It is a perennial canal, meaning it supplies water throughout the year. The Rohri Canal is part of the larger Sukkur Barrage irrigation system. The construction of the barrage itself began in 1923 and was completed in 1932. While the Rohri Canal's construction was completed before the barrage project.
