= Bandhi =

Pakistani town

Coordinates: 26°35′N 68°18′E

Bandhi ٻانڌي
- Town
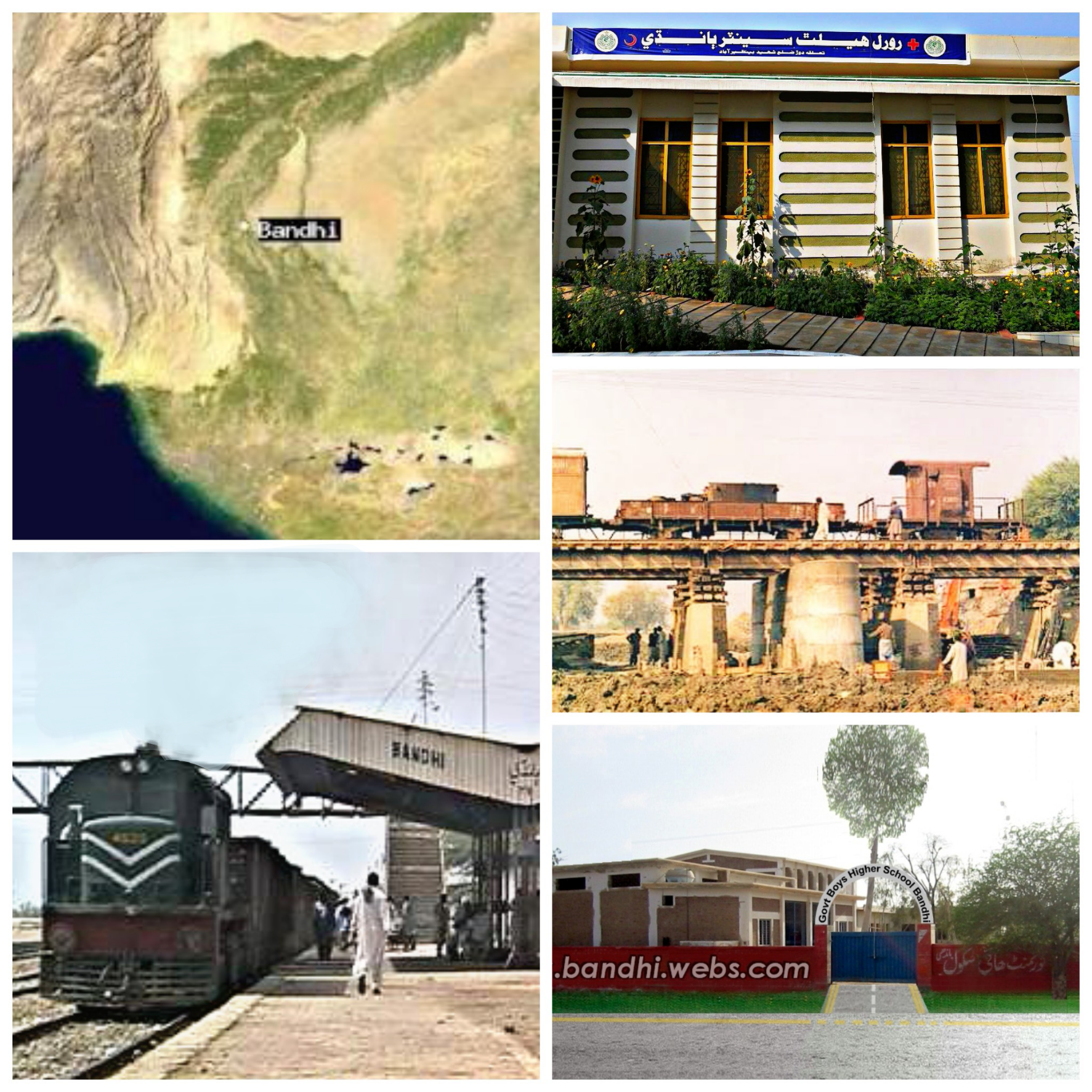
- Map, Railway Station, GBHS, Rural Health Center, Bandhi
- Interactive map of Bandhi
- Country: Pakistan
- Province: Sindh
- District: Shaheed Benazirabad

Area
  - Total: 5 km^{2} (1.9 sq mi)

Population (2023 census)
  - Total: 36,588
- Time zone: UTC+5 (PST)
- Calling code: 0244
- Website: bandhi.webs.com

Bandhi (Sindhi: ٻانڌي ) (Urdu: باندھی) is a town of Shaheed Benazir Abad District of Sindh, Pakistan. Its population is around 40,000.

== History ==
Bandhi is not a historically rich town.

== Demographics ==
Most of the people living in Bandhi town are Sindhi speaking (68%), others include Baloch (2%), Punjabis (3%), Pashtuns(1%), Urdu (25%) (Muhajirs) and Brahui (Brohi). Some 95% of the people are Muslims.

== Education ==
Primary schools and higher schools are available.

== See also ==
- Nawabshah
- Shaheed Benazirabad
- Daur
