= Bahadur Khan Dahri =

Pakistani politician

- بهادر خان ڏاھري

Member of the Provincial Assembly of Sindh
- Incumbent
- Assumed office 25 February 2024

Personal details
- Born: 22 November 1966 (age 59) Daulatpur, Sindh, Pakistan
- Party: PPP (2013-present)

Bahadur Khan Dahri (Sindhi: بهادر خان ڏاھري) is a Pakistani politician who had been a Member of the Provincial Assembly of Sindh, from May 2013 to May 2018. He elected back from PS 39 Shaheed Benazirabad on 8 Feb 2024, and won a majority poll.

http://www.pas.gov.pk/index.php/members/bydistrict/en/33/146

== Early life and education ==
He was born on 22 November 1966 in Daulatpur, Sindh.

He has a degree of Bachelor of Medicine, Bachelor of Surgery.

== Political career ==
He was elected to the Provincial Assembly of Sindh as a candidate of Pakistan Peoples Party from Constituency PS-28 SHAHEED BANAZIR ABAD-V in the 2013 Pakistani general election.
