= Mai Bakhtawar International Airport =

Airport in Pakistan

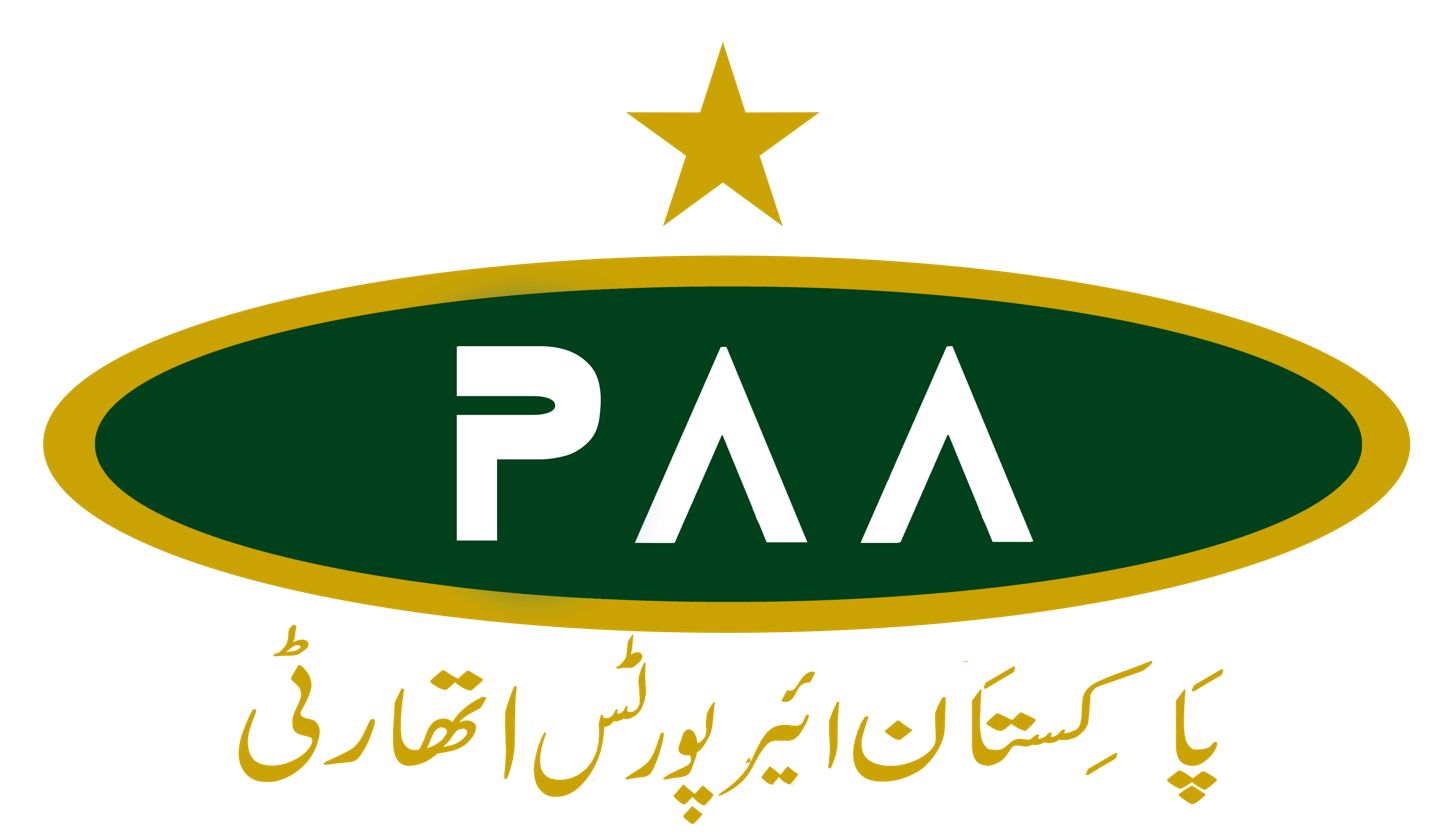
Mai Bakhtawar International Airport مائی بختاور بین الاقوامی ہوائی اڈہ

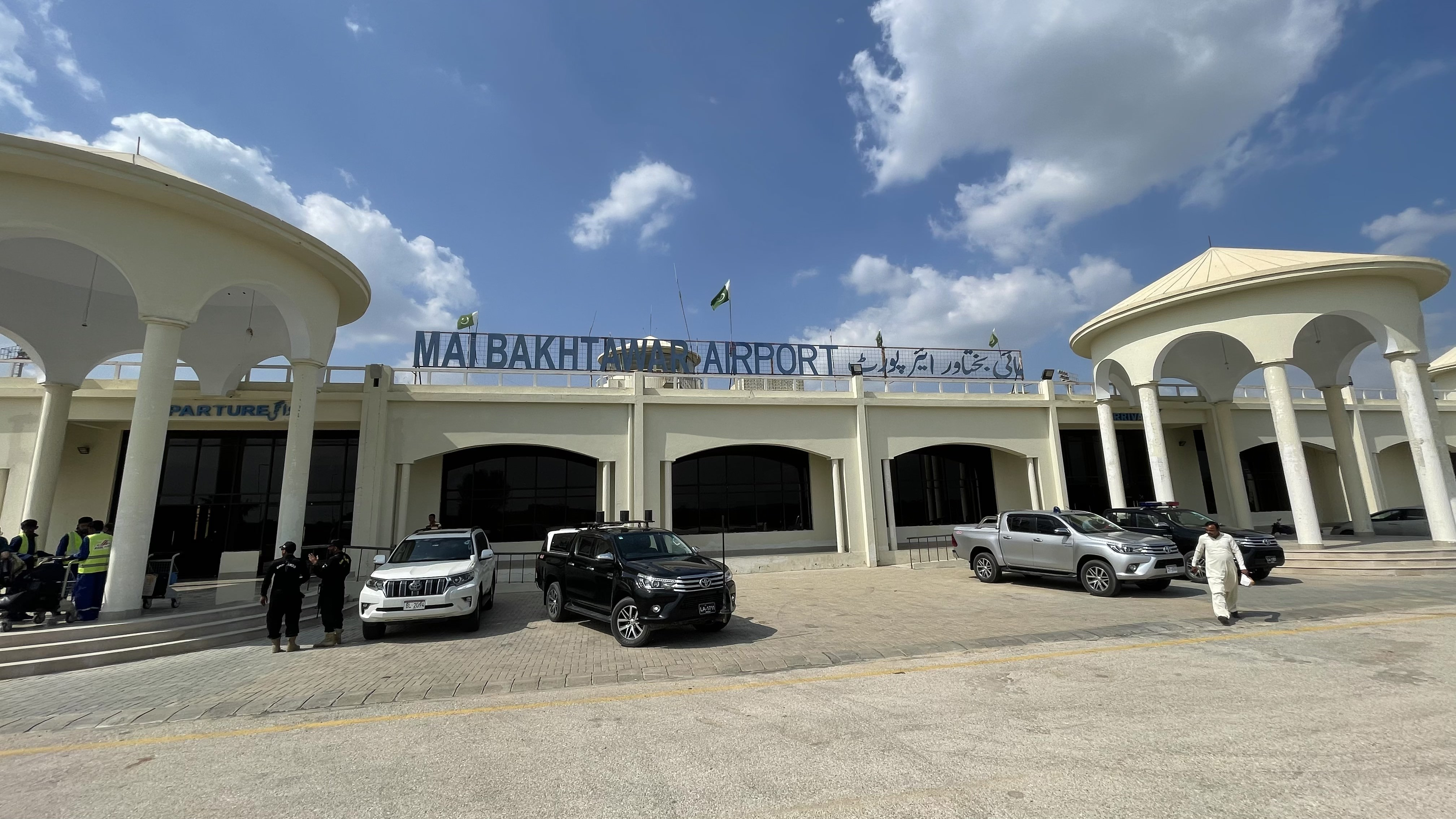
- IATA: none; ICAO: none

Summary
- Airport type: Public
- Owner/Operator: Pakistan Airports Authority
- Location: Islamkot, Sindh, Pakistan
- Opened: 2018; 8 years ago
- Elevation AMSL: 182 ft (55 m)
- Coordinates: 24°50′49.7″N 70°05′47.1″E
- Interactive map of Mai Bakhtawar International Airport

Runways
| Direction | Length | | Surface |
| Direction | m | ft | Surface |
|---|---|---|---|
| | 2,134 | 7,001 | Asphalt |

Mai Bakhtawar Airport located near Mithi and Islamkot in Tharparkar District, Sindh, Pakistan is named after Mai Bakhtawar Lashari. She was the first woman to lose her life during the peasant uprisings in Sindh in 1947.

The airport was built by the Civil Aviation Authority of Pakistan at a cost of Rs. 972.07 million, following a request from the Sindh Coal Authority to support the development of the nearby Thar coalfield. The Ministry of Defence granted clearance for its construction on 25 September 2009, as it is located within 80 km (50 mi) of Pakistan's international border with India.

The airport has been constructed to accommodate Category-C aircraft in accordance with International Civil Aviation Organization (ICAO) standards, featuring a 7,000-foot runway.

The airport serves both civil and military air traffic. Although it was inaugurated on 11 April 2018, it has faced challenges in reaching full completion.

== Airlines and Destinations ==
| Airlines | Destinations |
|---|---|
| Pakistan International Airlines | Charter: Karachi |
| ASSL Air | Charter: Karachi |

== See also ==
- List of airports in Pakistan
