= Kot Lalu =

Kot lalu (Sindhi: ڪوٽ لالُو) is a town located in Khairpur district, in Sindh, Pakistan. The town's name in English is also spelt Kot Lalloo. Kot lalu is rich with fertile lands and some areas are covered with sand dunes. The town has a hot climate, ranging from 40° to 60° Celsius. In winter, the average temperature falls by 10 °C. There is ancient muddy kot situated in Kot Laloo (Kot Lalu) on the Nawabshah Kumb bypass.

== Nearby areas ==
The Mehran Highway passes through the town, and this is the only road people use to travel to other areas. Areas near this town are Nangar Khan Mari, Nawabshah, Padidan, Mehrabpur, Thari Mirwah and Darya Khan Mari which is located in Naushahro Feroze district. The town is served by a railway station on the Karachi–Peshawar Line.

== Population ==
The population of this town is approximately 8,000 - 10,000. This includes people of many different religions and ethnic groups including Hindus, Punjabi and Pathan. Most of the town's land is inhabited by Sindhi and Punjabi people.

== Languages ==
The main language of communication is Sindhi. In addition to Sindhi, many different languages are spoken in Kot lalu including Hindi, Balochi, Panjabi, and Pashto.

== Source of Income ==
The majority of the people live in mud houses. Farming is the most common source of income. Some people fulfill their needs by working in cotton and sugar mills located inside the town. However, the dominant source of income is the import and export of the fruit and vegetables grown in the fertile lands, which also benefits other communities in Khairpur district. Area is also famous for lemon production. Town is lack of good health facility og quality education. Town is the home of so many atae doctors. It has been observed that use of steroid drugs increased by the atae doctors which effects badly on health of the peoples. Many peoples are suffering from diabetes, hypertension, osteoporosis, and heart attack.
