= Syed Ghulam Mustafa Shah (politician) =

Pakistani politician

- سید غلام مصطفیٰ شاہ

21st Deputy Speaker of the National Assembly of Pakistan
- Incumbent
- Assumed office 1 March 2024
- Speaker: Ayaz Sadiq
- Preceded by: Zahid Akram Durrani

Member of the National Assembly of Pakistan
- Incumbent
- Assumed office 29 February 2024
- Constituency: NA-208 Nawabshah-II
- In office 13 August 2018 – 10 August 2023
- Constituency: NA-214 (Shaheed Benazirabad-II)
- In office 16 November 2002 – 31 May 2018
- Constituency: NA-214 (Nawabshah-II)

Personal details
- Born: 27 October 1959 (age 66) Khairpur District, Sindh, Pakistan
- Party: PPP (2002-present)

Syed Ghulam Mustafa Shah (Urdu: سید غلام مصطفی شاہ; born 27 October 1959) is a Pakistani politician who is currently serving as the Deputy Speaker of the National Assembly. He has been a member of the National Assembly of Pakistan since 29 February 2024 and previously served in this position from 2002 to May 2018 and then from August 2018 till August 2023.

== Early life ==
He was born on 27 October 1959 in Khairpur District, Pakistan.

== Political career ==
He was elected to the National Assembly of Pakistan as a candidate of Pakistan Peoples Party (PPP) from Constituency NA-214 (Nawabshah-II) in the 2002 Pakistani general election. He received 60,267 votes and defeated Mumtaz Ahmed Rahu, a candidate of National Alliance.

He was re-elected to the National Assembly as a candidate of PPP from Constituency NA-214 (Nawabshah-II) in the 2008 Pakistani general election. He received 81,194 votes and defeated Khan Muhammad Dhari, a candidate of Pakistan Muslim League (Q) (PML-Q).

He was re-elected to the National Assembly as a candidate of PPP from Constituency NA-214 (Nawabshah-II) in the 2013 Pakistani general election. He received 135,502 votes and defeated Ali Asghar Rind, a candidate of Pakistan Muslim League (N) (PML-N).

He was re-elected to the National Assembly as a candidate of PPP from Constituency NA-214 (Shaheed Benazirabad-II) in the 2018 Pakistani general election. He received 110,921 votes and defeated Syed Zainulabdin, a candidate of Sindh United Party (SUP).

He was re-elected to the National Assembly as a candidate of PPP from NA-208 Nawabshah-II in the 2024 Pakistani general election. He received 127,181 votes and defeated Syed Zainulabdin, a candidate of the Grand Democratic Alliance (GDA).

On 1 March 2024, he was elected as the Deputy Speaker of the National Assembly. He received 197 votes and defeated Junaid Akbar, a candidate of the Sunni Ittehad Council (SIC), which was supported by Pakistan Tehreek-e-Insaf (PTI).
