= N-305 National Highway =

Road in Pakistan

National Highway 305
- قومی شاہراہ ٣٠٥
- Sakrand - Nawabshah Highway

Route information
- Length: 35 km (22 mi)

Major junctions
- North end: Nawabshah
- South end: Sakrand

Location
- Country: Pakistan

Highway system
- Roads in Pakistan

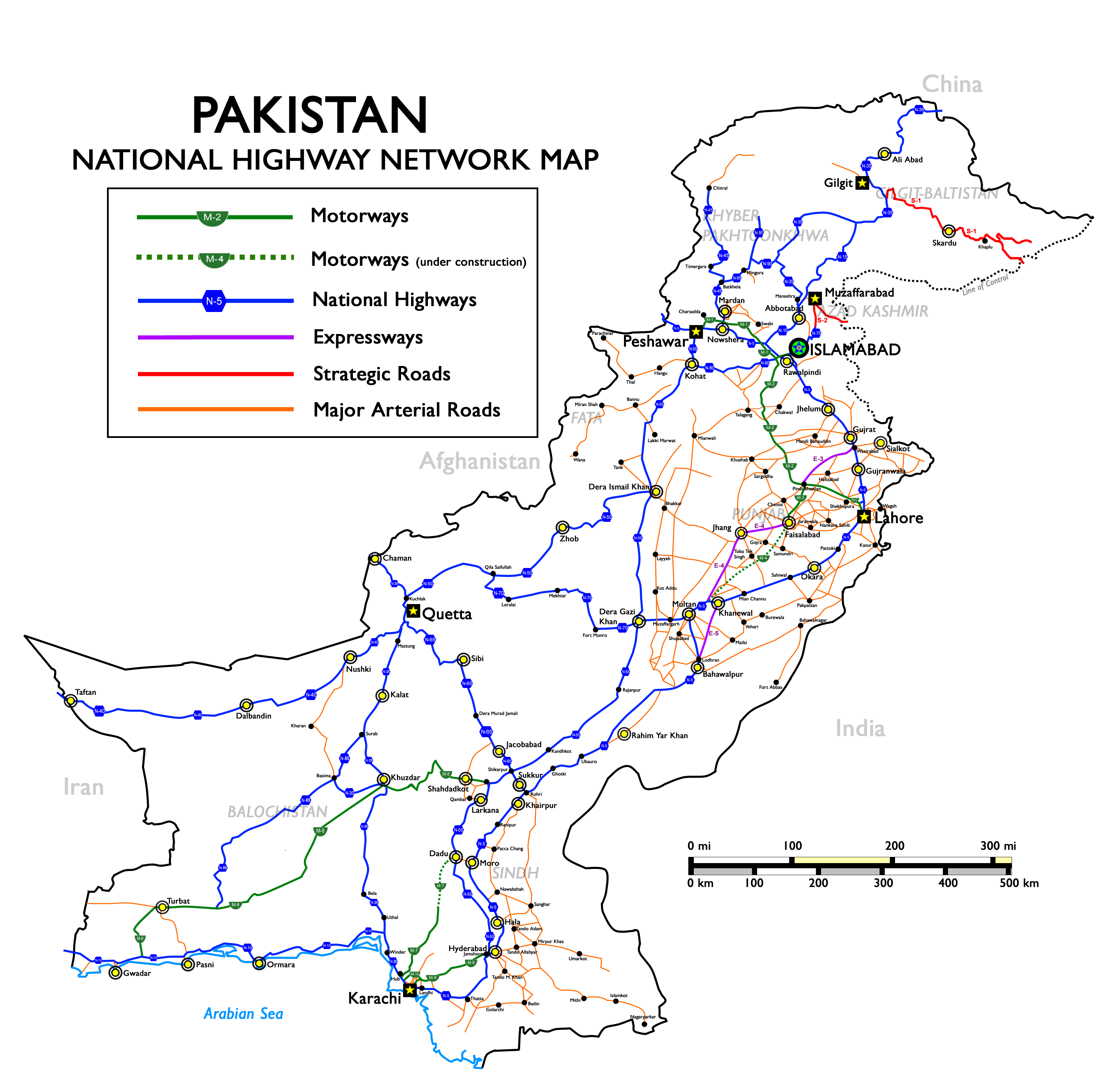
Map of National Highways of Pakistan

The National Highway 305 (Urdu: قومی شاہراہ ۳۰۵) or the N-305 is one of Pakistan National Highway running from Sakrand to the city of Nawabshah in Sindh province of Pakistan. Its total length is 35 km, the highway is maintained and operated by Pakistan's National Highway Authority.
