= Karoondi =

Town in northern Sindh

- Town
- Location within Sindh
- Coordinates: 26.897°N 68.406°E
- Country: Pakistan
- Province: Sindh
- District: Khairpur

Population (2023 census)
  - Total: 10,330

Karoondi (Sindhi:ڪرونڊي) is a town along Mehran Highway in District Khairpur, Sindh province of Pakistan.

== Demographics ==
The town has a population of about 10,300 people.
