= Thari Mirwah =

Pakistani town

Thari ٺري ميرواهه
- city
- Thari Mirwah
- Location within Sindh Location within Pakistan
- Coordinates: 27.068310°N 68.602252°E
- Country: Pakistan
- Province: Sindh
- District: Khairpur

Government
  - Assistant Commissioner: Gul Faisal Illahi
  - MPA: Rais Sajid Ali Khan Banbhan

Area
  - Total: 631 km^{2} (244 sq mi)
- Elevation: 45 m (148 ft)

Population (2023)602
  - Total: 379,615
- Time zone: UTC+5 (PST)
- Calling code: 0243
- Number of union councils: 20
- Number of villages of Thari Mirwah: 3000

Thari Mirwah (Sindhi: ٺري ميرواهه), commonly referred to as Thari (ٺري), is the administrative headquarter of Mirwah Subdivision (Mirwah taluka) in Khairpur District, Sindh, Pakistan. The town is located approximately 70 km south of Khairpur.

Thari Mirwah experiences a diverse climate, with average temperatures ranging from 14°C in winter to 40°C in summer, making it conducive to the cultivation of various cereals and vegetables.

== Etymology ==
The name Thari Mirwah is a compound word derived from two words: Thari (ٺري) and Mirwah (ميرواهه), the word Thari, which was the name of a female Hindu shopkeeper, and Mirwah, an eastern side canal of the Sukkur barrage, which is extracted from the Indus River at Sukkur barrage and flows from north to south to Thari tehsil.

== History of the city ==
The town of Thari was established by Hindu community, and donated their land to government to establish offices, schools, hospitals. Wadero Pirano Jogi donated his land to government to establish Rural Health Center at Thari.

The city of Thari Mirwah is capital of Mirwah subdivision, which was named after Mir Ali Murad Khan Talpur, the second ruler of the Khairpur State and a descendant of Mirwah branch.

== Education ==
Government educational institutes includes Government Boys Higher Secondary School Mengho Fakir Shar, Government Higher Secondary School Wafa Nawaz Ali Shar, Government High School Shah Muhammad Laghari, Government Boys High School Thari Mirwah, a Girls High School, Degree college, Government IT Centre under supervision of IBA-IET and a Mono-Technic & Vocasional college in Thari Mirwah.

== Roads & Infrastructure ==
Road in Thari Mirwah

As in other parts of Sindh, the condition of roads in Thari Mirwah is horrendous. However, the rehabilitation of the Thari-Setharja road is underway, and some construction has already been completed. On the eastern side of Thari is a desert known as Nara desert. A single road runs from Dhedano village to the Sawan gas field(Taluka Nara Distt Khairpur), where it turns into the gas company's blacktop highroad.

The newly constructed Mehran Highway is the only highway to connect Nawabshah District to Khairpur. The highway passes through the jurisdictions of Thari Mirwah, Faiz Ganj, Bandhi, and Daur. Construction lasted seven years. Many accidents have occurred on the completed highway, which is being used by illegal buses and coaches going to Punjab and Khyber Pakhtunkhwa, Fata.

On 24 August 2014, a coach coming from Punjab collided at Kot lalu with a van from Thari city which was traveling from Karachi to Thari Mirwah; 10 passengers were killed and 11 injured. All were natives of Thari Mirwah.
