= Sindh Local Government Ordinance, 2001 =

Sindh Assembly
- Long title: An Ordinance to reconstruct and regulate the local governments
- Citation: Ordinance No. XXVI of 2001
- Territorial extent: Whole of Sindh except cantonments
- Passed by: Provincial Assembly of Sindh
- Passed: August 14th, 2001
- Repealed: July 14th, 2011 (Sindh (Repeal of the Sindh Local Government Ordinance, 2001 and Revival of the Sindh Local Government Ordinance, 1979) Act, 2011, Act No. XXIV of 2011, No. PAS/Legis-B-25/2011)
- Status: Repealed

The Sindh Local Government Ordinance, 2001 was an ordinance passed by the Provincial Assembly of Sindh, Pakistan, on August 14, 2001, as part of a series of local government ordinances prepared by the National Reconstruction Bureau passed together by each of the four provinces at the time.

The ordinance was repealed with an act restoring the local government ordinance of 1979 by acting Governor Nisar Ahmed Khuhro following a political row between the PPP and MQM over statements made by Zulfiqar Mirza.

== See also ==
- Sindh Act, 2011
