= Hyder Bux Jatoi =

Pakistani politician and peasant leader

- حيدر بخش جتوئي
- Born: 7 October 1901; Bakhodero village, Larkana, Sindh, Bombay Presidency, British India, Pakistan
- Died: 21 May 1970 (aged 68); Hyderabad, Pakistan
- Known for: Writer, Poet, Left-wing peasant leader, Former president of Sindh Hari Committee

Hyder Bux Jatoi (Sindhi: حيدر بخش جتوئي; Urdu: حيدر بخش جتوئی), 7 October 1901 – 21 May 1970) was a revolutionary, leftist, peasant leader in Sindh, Pakistan. He is known as "Baba-e-Sindh" (Father of Sindh). He was also a Sindhi writer and poet. He was for many years the president of the Sindh Hari Committee (Sindh Peasants Committee), a constituent member of the National Awami Party.

== Early life ==
Hyder Bux Jatoi was born on 7 October 1901 in Bakhodero village near Mohenjo-daro in Larkana District. As his mother, Sahib Khatoon died soon after his birth, he was brought up by his father and aunts. Soon after, on completing his primary school, the young lad joined the Sindh Madarsah School at Larkana, where he topped the list of successful examinees every year. He topped the Sindh vernacular final examination in 1918 among candidates from all over Sindh and then won his first position in Sindh at the matriculation examination from the Bombay University in 1923. Hyder Bux Jatoi was an ethnic Baloch from Jatoi Tribe.

He studied at the D. J. Science College, Karachi, and remained a resident boarder in Metharam Hostel attached to the college. He graduated in 1927 with honours in literature and won distinction in Persian from the Bombay University. He served as editor of the college miscellany and won the annual award for writing a poem called "college kabootar" (the college pigeon). Throughout his student life at Larkana and Karachi, he was a scholarship holder.

Hyder Bux Jatoi resigned from the post as deputy collector in the British colonial government in 1945 to lead the Sindh peasants’ rights movement Hyder Bux Jatoi translation of the Quran in English. in 1947 during a conference of farmers to demand that they receive a half share of the yield. The Hari Conference in started in Judho on 22 June 1947. Mai Bakhtawar was murdered.

He married his cousin Sammul at the age of 27. They had five sons, Mustafa, Mazhar Ali, Dadan, Hatim, and Murtaza.

== Sindh Hari Committee ==
The subhuman conditions of harees (farmers) and tillers of the land led him to resign from his job in 1945 and to join the Sindh Hari Party.

He began his career in social service and politics as a member of the Indian National Congress.

"We are now passing through the same stage in the history of our economic life through which the leading nations of Europe passed more than 400 years ago, this showed how backward we were, and have been kept where we are."

This poem, too was translated by Jatoi himself:

"The infidels are rejoicing, show sense of honour
The seekers are suffering pains, show some love
The devotees are dying of thirst, show some mercy
Show some differentiation in The friendship and the enmity".

His poetry "Jeay Sindh aen jeay Sindh, Jam-e-Muhabat pieay Sindh" was sung by Sindhi folk singer Zarina Baloch.

== Death ==
He died on 21 May 1970 at Hyder Manzil, Hyder chowk, Hyderabad. He had written his epitaph before his death, which was read at his funeral:

"O death you have cooled every vein and vessel of mine, Be happy O friend without you rest in life is not possible."

His wife Mumtaz Hyder died five months later and was buried beside him.

== See also ==
- Mai Bakhtawar
