= Sindh Irrigated Agriculture Productivity Enhancement Project =

Government agency in Sindh, Pakistan

Sindh Irrigated Agriculture Productivity Enhancement Project (SIAPEP)
- Formation: 2015
- Established: 2015
- Type: Government agency
- Location: Sindh, Pakistan
- Key people: ENGR. THARU MAL DODANI (Chairman)
- Staff: 1 Chairman + 7 Members
- Website: siapep.org

The Sindh Irrigated Agriculture Productivity Enhancement Project (SIAPEP) is a provincial agency of the Government of Sindh in Pakistan they are improving irrigation water management at tertiary and field levels in Sindh Pakistan.

The Sindh Irrigated Agriculture Productivity Enhancement Project (SIAPEP) is a World Bank funded Project. Started in 2015 and Closed in 2021.

World Bank total project cost US$242.20 M, Commitment amount US$187.00 M to enhance Sindh agriculture productivity.
