= Runwati =

Raunwati
- Town
- Raunwati
- Location within Sindh Location within Pakistan
- Coordinates: 28°10′11.0″N 69°36′07.3″E
- Country: Pakistan
- Province: Sindh
- District: Ghotki
- Time zone: UTC+5 (PST)

Raunwati is a town of the Ghotki District, Ubauro Tehsil in Sindh province of Pakistan.
