= Daulatpur, Sindh =

Town in Sindh, Pakistan

Coordinates: 26.503°N 67.974°E

- Interactive map of Daulatpur, Sindh
- Country: Pakistan
- Province: Sindh

Population (2023 Census)
  - Total: 14,508

Daulatpur (Sindhi: دولت پور) is a town in the Nawabshah District of the Sindh province of Pakistan, 20 km (12 mi) north of Kazi Ahmed and 20 km (12 mi) south of Moro.. It was also taluka headquarters. It lies on the main N-5 National Highway and is near the Indus River. People Of Daulatpur Mostly Speak Urdu And Sindhi. Shahi Bazaar Is The Main Bazaar In Daulatpur. Moro Is At The Distance Of 19.7 km Far From Daulatpur. Most Of The People Have Their Own Shops Or Business

== History ==
It was at the forefront of the Movement for Restoration of Democracy (MRD) of 1983.

== Transport ==
- The main N-5 highway passes through.
- The railway line operated until the 1980s.
