= Sindh Hari Committee =

Defunct political party in Pakistan

Sindh Hari Committee سنڌ هاري ڪاميٽي
- Leader: Hyder Bux Jatoi; Azhar Jatoi
- Founder: G. M. Syed
- Founded: 1930
- Ideology: Labor rights Sindhi nationalism
- Political position: Left-wing

Party flag

The Sindh Hari Committee (Sindhi: سنڌ هاري ڪميٽي) was a leftist and Sindhi nationalist political organization in Sindh, Pakistan that sought to promote the interests of the Haris (landless peasant farmers) of Sindh. It was founded in 1930 by G. M. Syed. In 1947, Hyder Bux Jatoi took over as president of the committee until his death in 1970. In 1957, it became a constituent party of the National Awami Party.

The Sindh Hari Committee ceased to function as an official political party in the 1970s. However, it continues to exist as a movement advocating for Sindhi peasant rights, maintaining an online presence and engaging in activism. While the original committee lost prominence as a political force during the 1970s, its legacy persists through grassroots efforts and historical significance.

Today, the Sindh Hari Committee is no longer active in mainstream Pakistani politics but remains a symbol of peasant advocacy. Although it holds little influence in national politics, it has stayed relevant by opposing issues such as the transfer of peasant land to clans during the 2000s and 2010s. As of 2024, the Committee has also voiced opposition to the Pakistan People’s Party (PPP), underscoring its continued commitment to representing the rights of Sindhi peasants.
