= Ranipur, Sindh =

Pakistani town

راڻي پور رانی پور
- City
- Ranipur
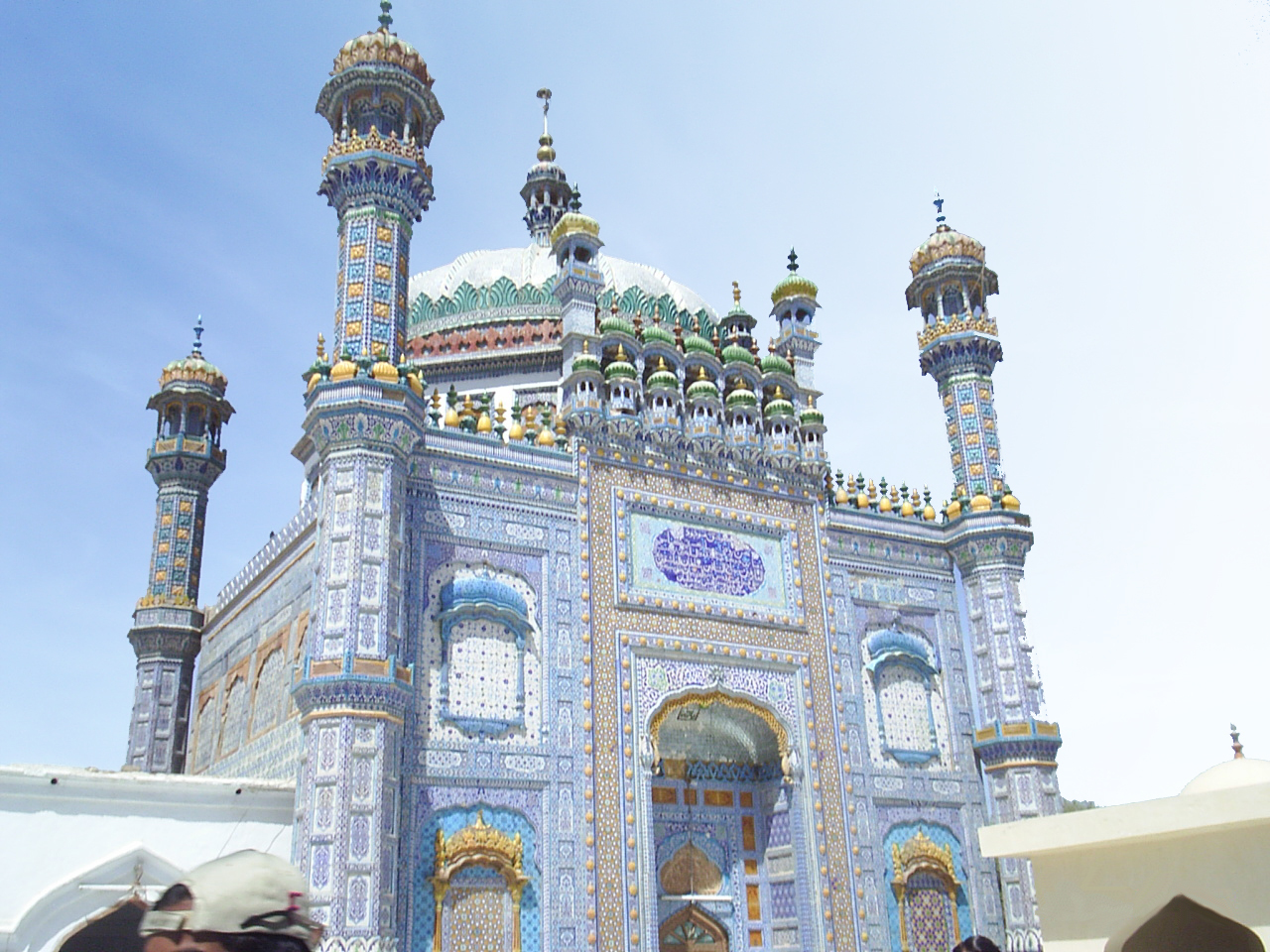
- Ranipur's shrine of Sachal Sarmast is decorated with traditional Sindhi-style tile work.

- Location within Pakistan Location within Sindh
- Coordinates: 27°17′20″N 68°30′16″E
- Country: Pakistan
- Province: Sindh
- District: Khairpur
- Elevation: 45 m (148 ft)

Population (2023)
  - Total: 34,337
- Time zone: UTC+5 (PST)
- Calling code: 0243
- Number of Union Councils: 1

Ranipur (Sindhi: راڻي پور, Urdu: رانی پور) is a town in northern Sindh province of Pakistan, located in approximately 50 kilometers from the city of Khairpur, and approximately 30 kilometers from the ancient Kot Diji fort. Ranipur is notable for being home of the famous Sachal Sarmast shrine, which displays fine examples of a traditional Sindhi tilework.

== History ==
Ranipur, a unique city situated between the Rohri Canal to the east and the Abul Canal to the west, was established before the Kalhora reign of Sindh (1701 to 1783 AD). The name "Ranipur", meaning Queen, is believed to be derived from tha princess of Darya Khan, who ruled over Thatta. The city gained prominence during British rule when it became a centre for an anti-Khilafat movement led by local Pirs to support the interests of the British Raj in Sindh. Today, Ranipur is a major town and Union Council within the Khairpur District.

Dargah of Pirs of Ranipur was established way back in 1781. According to available historical facts that the two sons Pir Syed Abdul Aziz viz; Syed Muhammad Shah and Syed Ahmed Shah when arrived here from Baghdad they were accorded tumultuous welcome and were allowed to preach, by the then Kalhora rulers of Sindh. Both of these scholarly figures after visiting Hyderabad and Khudabad came to Kazi Makhdoom Ahmadi of Khuhrra and stayed with him as guest of nearly a year. Latter on Makhdoom Ahmadi allowed them to established Madarssas in Ranipur and Gambat. Both brothers were married from local Wandeer clan and with in no time they attracted large following. It is said that Syed Muhammad Shah had earlier also paid a visit to Sindh, but he was disallowed to stay for being a suspected spy of Turkish government. Syed Muhammad Shah, who stayed in Gambat had a son named Abdul Razzaq Shah, died while he was still alive. While Syed Ahmed Shah of Ranipur had four sons namely Saleh Shah, Ibrahim Shah, Abdul Rahim Shah and Abdul Aziz Shah alias Abdul Ghaffar Shah. Syed Saleh Shah after the demise of his father became the custodian of Dargah of Ranipur, while his younger brother Syed Ibrahim Shah shifted to Gambat and lived along with his uncle Muhammad Shah. While Abdul Rahim Shah's son Shair Muhammad Shah alias Pir Shair shifted to Larkana and became the Mutawali of Syed Siraj Shah's Dargah. During the course of time Kalhora dynasty camae to an end and Talpurs took over the reins of Sindh, since Talpur rulers such as Mir Sohrab Khan and Mir Rustam Khan accorded respect to the pirs of Ranipur and Gambat more than that of they enjoyed during the period of Kalhoras. Talpurs also use them for official consultancy. Syed Saleh Shah of Ranipur was a pious man and he was equally popular in and around the country. He was also known as Sakhi Saleh Shah Thorrho. He had a son named Pir Ghulam Mohiuddin Shah, who was the friend of Punjab's great Sufi poet Khowaja Ghulam Fareed. Source: Khairpur Jewel & Crown of Sindh by Momin Bullo | Coordinates: https://geohack.toolforge.org/geohack.php?pagename=Ranipur,_Sindh&params=27_17_20_N_68_30_16_E_region:PK_type:city (https://heritage.eftsindh.com/site/804/khairpur/pirs-ranipur)

== Economy ==
Ranipur Sugar Mills is centrally located on 133.5 acres in the sugar cane growing area of Ranipur.

== Education ==
Government Primary Boys School Ranipur was established in 1892 AD. Government High School Ranipur was founded in 1939. Government Girls Primary School, Sachal Sarmast Degree College, and Government Girls Degree College Ranipur are Prime Institute of City. Private sector, Ahlul Bait Public School, Mehran Public Higher Secondary School, Yasir Public High School, Ever Shine College, Mazhar Muslim Model School College, Bahria Foundation College. Sachal public school, Eman public school, City has Religious Educational Named Dar-ul-Fauoz madarsa(دارالفيوض ) Soomra Muhalla, Jamia Masjid Memon Muhalla, where students getting Education in Arabic as well as in Persian.

== Culture ==
Six shrines make it popular in the country. These are shrine of Saleh Shah and Hajran shah famous as Bodelo Bahar. Nowadays this city is famous for its numerous Gates, 1. Babe Dastageer, 2. Babe Sachal Sarmast, 3. Babe Bodela, 4. Babe Saleh Sha, 5. Babe Abdul Jabbar Shah. 6. Shatan Shah Badshah

== Transportation ==
Ranipur is located at kilometer marker 419 on the main N-5 National Highway. 3 kilometer at daraza sharif where the tomb of Hazrat Sachal Sarmast is located a famous Sufi poet of Sindh. Ranipur is the heart of khairpur.
