= Shaheed Benazirabad District =

Coordinates: 26°35′N 68°10′E

Shaheed Benazirabad District شهيد بينظيرآباد ضلعو ضلع شہید بینظیر آباد Nawabshah District نوابشاھ ضلعو ضلع نوابشاہ
- District of Sindh
- Benazirabad
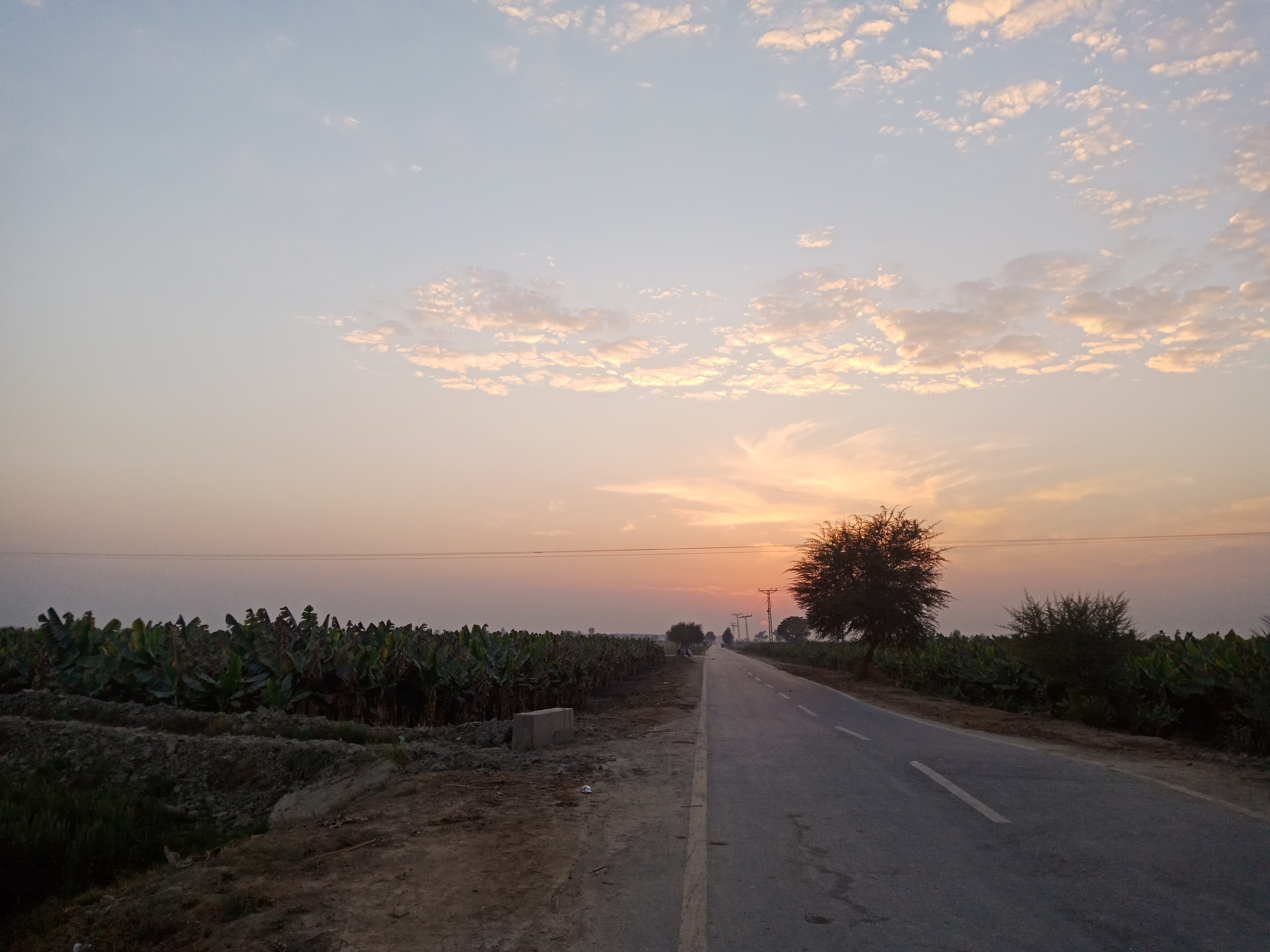
- Sunset on Nawabshah-Sarhari road

- Map of Sindh with Shaheed Benazirabad District
- Country: Pakistan
- Province: Sindh
- Division: Shaheed Benazir Abad
- Established: 1 November 1912; 113 years ago
- Founder: British government
- Headquarters: Nawabshah
- Administrative Taluka: 04: Daur Taluka Kazi Ahmed Taluka Nawabshah Taluka Sakrand Taluka

Government
  - Type: District Administration
  - Deputy Commissioner: Abdul Samad Nizamani
  - Constituensy: NA-207 Nawabshah-I; NA-208 Nawabshah-II

Area
  - District of Sindh: 4,502 km^{2} (1,738 sq mi)
- Elevation: 31 m (102 ft)

Population (2023)
  - District of Sindh: 1,845,102
  - Density: 409.8/km^{2} (1,061/sq mi)
  - Urban: 598,120
  - Rural: 1,246,982

Literacy
  - Literacy rate: Total: 50.86%; Male: 61.07%; Female: 40.29%
- Time zone: UTC+05:00 (PKT)
  - Summer (DST): DST is not observed
- ZIP Code: 67450
- NWD (area) code: 244
- ISO 3166 code: PK-SD

Shaheed Benazirabad District (Sindhi: شهيد بينظيرآباد ضلعو, Urdu: ضلع شہید بینظیر آباد) previously known as Nawabshah District, is a district in the province of Sindh, Pakistan.

== Renaming ==
The district was renamed in September 2008 when members of the Provincial Assembly of Sindh from Nawabshah lobbied for the district to be renamed in honour of Benazir Bhutto, who was assassinated in December 2007.

The renaming of the district was criticised by the family of Syed Nawabshah and others who, while saddened at the death of Bhutto, felt that Nawabshah was a historic district and ought to have kept its name.

== History ==
At the establishment of the district on 1 November 1912, seven talukas were included in this district:

1. Kandiaro
2. Naushero Feroze
3. Moro
4. Sakrand
5. Nawabshah
6. Sinjhoro
7. Shahdadpur

The district was divided into two Sub-divisions, namely Nawabshah Sub-division and Naushahro Feroze Sub-division. The former comprised the three talukas Shahdadpur, Sinjhoro and Nawabshah, while the later comprise the four talukas of Kandiaro, Naushahro Feroze, Moro and Sakrand.

In 1953 the talukas of Shahdadpur and Sinjhoro became part of the newly established Sanghar District. This left Nawabshah Sub-division with only one taluka, so Sakrand taluka was moved from Naushahro Feroze Sub-division to Nawabshah Sub-division. In 1989, another part of the district, the talukas of Nausehro Feroz, Kandiaro and half of the taluka of Moro, was cleaved from it to form the new Naushahro Feroze District. A new taluka, Daulatpur, was created, from half of the Moro and some of Sakrand taluka in Nawabshah district. The district then contained three talukas:

1. Nawabshah
2. Sakrand
3. Daulatpur

In 2005, after the local government election, a new taluka named Daur was cleaved from Nawabshah taluka and Daulatpur taluka renamed to Kazi Ahmed.

The district then comprised four talukas:

1. Nawabshah
2. Sakrand
3. Daulatpur (now Kazi Ahmed)
4. Daur

In May 2014, a 5.0 magnitude earthquake struck the district, killing one person and injuring 70.

== Administrative ==
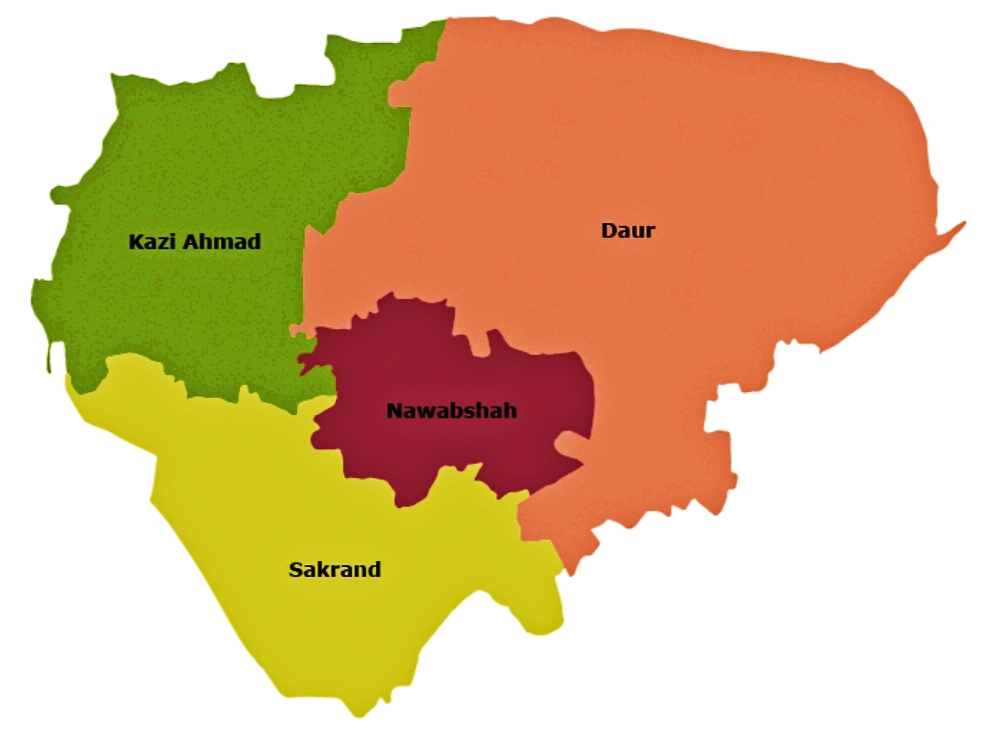
Taluks of Shaheed Benazirabad District

Shaheed Benazir Abad formerly Nawabshah District. The Deputy Commissioner is responsible for overall administration of the district. Miss Kanwal Nizam Shaikh is currently the Deputy Commissioner of Shaheed Benazirabad since May 2023. She is the first female officer in history of Shaheed Benazirabad to serve as DC. The district is sub-divided into four Tehsils:

- Sakrand
- Nawabshah
- Qazi Ahmed
- Daur

== Demographics ==
Historical population
Year	Pop.	±% p.a.
1951	228,016	—
1961	330,730	+3.79%
1972	678,982	+6.76%
1981	838,350	+2.37%
1998	1,102,584	+1.62%
2017	1,613,506	+2.02%
2023	1,845,102	+2.26%

As of the 2023 census, Shaheed Benazirabad district has 334,356 households and a population of 1,845,102. The district has a sex ratio of 103.18 males to 100 females and a literacy rate of 50.86%: 61.07% for males and 40.29% for females. 606,305 (32.87% of the surveyed population) are under 10 years of age. 598,120 (32.42%) live in urban areas.

Religions in Shaheed Benazirabad district (2023)
Religion	Percent
Islam	95.06%
Hinduism	4.49%
Other	0.45%

Religion in contemporary Shaheed Benazirabad District
Religious group	1941 (Note: 1941 census data is for Nawabshah and Sakrand talukas of erstwhile Nawabshah district, which roughly corresponds to the present district. District and taluk borders have changed since 1995, namely the splitting of Moro taluk and its division between two districts.)		2017		2023	
Religious group	Pop.	%	Pop.	%	Pop.	%
Islam	113,964	79.21%	1,545,996	95.82%	1,753,589	95.06%
Hinduism	27,102	18.84%	62,316	3.86%	82,817	4.49%
Sikhism	2,462	1.71%	—N/a	—N/a	24	~0%
Christianity	60	0.04%	4,044	0.25%	6,507	0.35%
Others (Note: Including Jainism, Christianity, Buddhism, Zoroastrianism, Judaism, Ad-Dharmis, or not stated)	288	0.20%	1,150	0.07%	1,690	0.10%
Total Population	143,876	100%	1,613,506	100%	1,844,627	100%

The majority religion is Islam, with 95.05% of the population. Hinduism (including those from Scheduled Castes) is practiced by 4.49% of the population. Members of other religions were mostly Christians, who mostly live in Nawabshah city.

Languages of Shaheed Benazirabad district (2023)
1. Sindhi (85.2%)
2. Urdu (6.17%)
3. Punjabi (3.63%)
4. Brahui (1.64%)
5. Balochi (1.57%)
6. Others (1.79%)

At the time of the 2023 census, 85.2% of the population spoke Sindhi, 6.17% Urdu, 3.63% Punjabi, 1.64% Brahui and 1.57% Balochi as their first language.

== Education ==
District Shaheed Benazirabad is ranked at the 125th position in the education score index of the Pakistan District Education Rankings 2017 published by Alif Ailaan.

Low learning outcome issues remain a hindrance for district Shaheed Benazirabad. Issues reported by the residents via the Taleem Do! App complain of the lack of primary schools in the area.

== Events ==
The H. M. Khoja Annual Flower Show was introduced by H. M. Khoja in 1954 at Khoja Garden. The celebrations take place for three or four days.

== Major educational institutes ==
Educational institutions in district Benazirabad include:

=== Universities ===
- People's University of Medical & Health Sciences for Women, Benazirabad
- Quaid-e-Awam University of Engineering, Science & Technology, Benazirabad
- Shaheed Benazir Bhutto University, Shaheed Benazirabad
- Shaheed Benazir Bhutto University of Veterinary and Animal Sciences, Aliabad, Benazirabad

=== Colleges ===
- Bakhtawar Cadet College For Girls Shaheed Benazirabad
- Quaid-e-Azam Law College Nawabshah

== Major Health Centres ==
- Benazir Institute Urology and Transplantation
- Civil Hospital Nawabshah
- NORIN Cancer Hospital Nawabshah, Shaheed Benazirabad

== Union Councils ==
There are 62 Union Councils in Shaheed Benazirabad District: Union Councils are given below:

Name of Tehsil	No of Union Councils	Headquarter
Nawabshah	Wali Muhammad Rind Mureed Khan Zardari Chaneser Sakhi Umeed Ali Gandtar Khairshah Jari (old N/Shah)	Nawabshah
Sakrand	Guhram Mari Bahawal Shah Sukho Mari Bhooro Mehrabpur Fathepur Punhal Khan Chandio Majeed Kerio Marvi Mari Jalbani Morio Lakho Dalel Dero Jamal Kerio Khadhar Hamal Faqir Kumblima Hassan Jamali Karam Jamali Mirza Faruk Baig	Sakrand
Kazi Ahmed	Kazi Ahmed Phullel Noor Ja Quba Khar Chariro Sawri Manhoro Sann Haberi Jamal Shah Khan Muhammad Jalbani Sher Ali Shah Mirza Bagh Mehroro Ahmed Bughio Saeed Kando Pat Peeral Thatt Deran Mir Muhammad Juno	Kazi Ahmed
Daur	Amirji Abdul Hassan Obhari Sawri Ghulam Hyder Shah Nathiyani Sher Khan Jamali Suhello Jhuro Khan Shar Abdul Khan Lund 60 Mile 68 Mile Hote Faqir Rind Jam Datar Ismail Khan Brohi Gupchani	Daur

== List of Dehs ==
The following is a list of Dadu District's 351 dehs, organised by taluka:

- Nawabshah taluka (51 dehs)
- 86-Nasrat
- 87-Nasrat
- 87-A Nasrat
- 88 Nasrat
- 89 Nasrat
- 90-Nasrat
- 91-Nasrat
- 102-Nasrat
- 103-Nasrat
- 104-Nasrat
- 6-Dad
- 8-Dad
- 13-Dad
- 14-Dad
- 15-Dad
- 16-Dad
- 17-Dad
- 18-Dad
- 19-Dad
- 20-Dad
- 21-Dad
- 22-Dad
- 23-Dad
- 24-Dad
- 25-Dad
- 26-Dad
- 27-Dad
- 28-Dad
- 29-Dad
- 30-Dad
- 31-Dad
- 32-Dad
- 33-Dad
- 34-Dad
- 35-Dad
- 36-Dad
- 37-Dad
- 38-Dad
- 39-Dad
- 40-Dad
- 41-Dad
- 42-Dad
- 43-Dad
- 44-Dad
- 46-Dad
- 47-Dad
- 48-Dad
- 49-Dad
- 50-Dad
- Khiyaroon
- Lakhmir
- Daur taluka (169 dehs)
- 01-Dad
- 2-Dad
- 3-Dad
- 3-A Dad
- 4-Dad
- 4-A Dad
- 5-Dad
- 7-Dad
- 09-Dad
- 10-Dad
- 11-Dad
- 12-Dad
- 1-Nasrat
- 2-Nasrat
- 3-Nasrat
- 4-Nasrat
- 5-Nasrat
- 6-Nasrat
- 07-Nasrat
- 08-Nasrat
- 09-Nasrat
- 10-Nasrat
- 11-Nasrat
- 12-Nasrat
- 12-A Nasrat
- 13 Nasrat
- 14-Nasrat
- 15-Nasrat
- 16-Nasrat
- 17-Nasrat
- 18-Nasrat
- 19-Nasrat
- 20-Nasrat
- 21-Nasrat
- 22-Nasrat
- 23-Nasrat
- 24-Nasrat
- 25-Nasrat
- 26-Nasrat
- 26-A Nasrat
- 27-Nasrat
- 28-Nasrat
- 29-Nasrat
- 30-Nasrat
- 31-Nasrat
- 32-Nasrat
- 33-Nasrat
- 34-Nasrat
- 35-Nasrat
- 36-Nasrat
- 37-Nasrat
- 38-Nasrat
- 39-Nasrat
- 40-Nasrat
- 41-Nasrat
- 42-Nasrat
- 43-Nasrat
- 44-Nasrat
- 45-Nasrat
- 46-Nasrat
- 47-Nasrat
- 48-Nasrat
- 49-Nasrat
- 50-Nasrat
- 51-Nasrat
- 52-Nasrat
- 53-Nasrat
- 54-Nasrat
- 55-Nasrat
- 56-Nasrat
- 57-Nasrat
- 58-Nasrat
- 59-Nasrat
- 60-Nasrat
- 61-Nasrat
- 62-Nasrat
- 63-Nasrat
- 64-Nasrat
- 65-Nasrat
- 66-Nasrat
- 67-Nasrat
- 68-Nasrat
- 69-Nasrat
- 70-Nasrat
- 71-Nasrat
- 72-Nasrat
- 72-A Nasrat
- 73-Nasrat
- 74-Nasrat
- 75-Nasrat
- 76-Nasrat
- 77-Nasrat
- 78-Nasrat
- 79-Nasrat
- 80-Nasrat
- 81-Nasrat
- 82-Nasrat
- 83-Nasrat
- 84-Nasrat
- 85-Nasrat
- 92-Nasrat
- 93-Nasrat
- 94-Nasrat
- 95-Nasrat
- 96-Nasrat
- 97-Nasrat
- 98-Nasrat
- 99-Nasrat
- 100-Nasrat
- 101-Nasrat
- 105-Nasrat
- 105-A Nasrat
- 106-Nasrat
- 107-Nasrat
- 108-Nasrat
- 109-Nasrat
- 110-Nasrat
- 111-Nasrat
- 112-Nasrat
- 113-Nasrat
- 114-Nasrat
- 115-Nasrat
- 116-Nasrat
- 117-Nasrat
- Akro
- Akro-2
- Akro-3
- Akro-4
- Akro-5
- Akro-5/A
- Akro-6
- Akro-7
- Akro-8
- Akro-9
- Amerji
- Chack-2
- Chack-3
- Chack-4
- Chack-5
- Chack-6
- Chack 1to11 Suhelo
- Chack 1to6 O/Sawri
- Chhan Babu
- G.A. Dago
- G.A. Daur
- G.A. Makhand
- Gojro
- Goongothar
- Gujhro
- Gupchani
- Jhemal
- Jhip
- Kalri
- Mari Sabhar
- Obhari Amerji Chak-2
- Obhari Amerji Chak-3
- Obhari Sawari
- Obhari Sawari
- Obhari Sawari
- Obhari Sawari
- Obhari Sawari
- Panjo Chan
- Shah Hussain
- Suhelo Chack-2
- Suhelo Chack-3
- Suhelo Chack-4
- Suhelo Chack-5
- Suhelo Chack-6
- Qazi Ahmed taluka (65 dehs)
- Abad Makkhand
- Ahmed Bughio
- Allah Khai
- Amerji
- Bambhai
- Bambhai Jagir
- Bet Safan
- Bhellaro
- Bogri
- Charioro
- Daulatpur
- Deran
- Dim
- Drigh
- Gair Abad Makhand
- Haberi
- Hothepota
- Jari
- Jarkhoyaro Jagir
- Jarkhoyaro Rayati
- Jugpal
- Junjhan
- Kaka
- Kandhari
- Kacho That
- Keti Hassan Shah
- Khambro
- Khar
- Khariro
- Kharjani
- Kundah Nandho
- Kundah Wado
- Kungo
- Kunro
- Malwah
- Manharo
- Mehrab Wai
- Mehraro
- Mir Mohammad Juno
- Mir Rukan
- Mirza Bagh
- Mirzapur Jagir-1
- Mirzapur Jagir-2
- Noor Muhammad
- Olahi Amerhi
- Padd
- Pat Peeral
- Phulel
- Pubjo
- Qazi Ahmed
- Raja Wah
- Re-Hothepota
- Saeed Kandho
- Sarman Kandi
- Sawari
- Seendhal Kamal
- Seerchja
- Shahpur
- Sukhpur
- Sun
- Talhi
- That Jagir-1
- That Jagir-2
- That Rayati
- Utar Sawari
- Sakrand taluka (64 dehs)
- 1-Rain Boobak
- 2-Sukhio Manahijo
- 3-Samo Rahu
- 4-Bachal Rahu
- 5-Sobho Lund
- 6-Marvi
- 7-Darri
- 8-Ikhraj
- 9-Noor Bhoora
- 10-Bhoora
- 11-Rahib Shah
- 12-Mehrabpur
- 13-Marri
- 14-Ladho Chandio
- 15-Fatih Pur
- 16-Jam Jodho
- 17-Fareed Keerio
- 18-Sakranad
- 19-Jalalani
- 20-Bhutta
- 21-Dadh
- 22-Dino Shah
- 23-Satt Puri
- 24/1 Dalel Dero
- 24/2 Dalel Dero
- 25-Batho
- Bahawal Shah
- Bao
- Bello Lakhat
- Belo Madd
- Belo Marri
- Belo Mehrabpur
- Belop Nasri
- Bhiraro
- Chan Biar
- Chattan Shah
- Gohram Mari
- Golo Dahri
- Hala Wahar
- Jado Jono
- Jamal Keerio
- Khadhar
- Kot Dhingano
- Kumb Leema
- Lakha Jageer
- Lakha-1
- Lakha-2
- Lakhat
- Lal M Bheenjo
- Madd
- Morio Lakho
- Morri
- Munhar
- Naqqur
- Roomio
- Sabu Rahu
- Sukh Pur
- Sutiaro
- Tali
- Tharo Unar
- Tirchi
- Tirchi-2
- Torri
- Yakhtiar Khan

== See also ==
- Municipal Corporation Shaheed Benazirabad
- Bahria Town Benazirabad
- People's Bus Service Benazirabad

== Sources ==
- 1998 District census report of Nawabshah. Census publication. Vol. 63. Islamabad: Population Census Organization, Statistics Division, Government of Pakistan. 2000.
- Website of the Election Commission of Pakistan (Election Results National Assembly)
- The book Aeena Zila Nawabshah compiled and written by Muhammad Ayub Shad
