= Moro, Pakistan =

Administrative geographic subdivision Tehsil in Sindh, Pakistan

Moro مورو
- City
- Location within Sindh Location within Pakistan
- Coordinates: 26.6623°N 68.001°E
- Country: Pakistan
- Province: Sindh

Government
  - Type: Municipal Committee
  - Chairman: Ali Nawaz Nazeer Ahmed
  - Vice Chairman: Muhammad Anwar
- Elevation: 28 m (92 ft)

Population (2023)
  - City: 142,685
  - Rank: 82nd in Pakistan
- Time zone: UTC+5 (PST)
- +92: +92242
- Number of Union councils: 12
- Website: www.sindh.gov.pk

Moro (Sindhi: مورو) is a city in the Naushahro Feroze District, of Sindh, Pakistan.

The city is administratively subdivided into 12 Union councils. and is located on National highway (N5) in the centre of Sindh at an altitude of 28 m (95 ft) and is 12 km of the Indus River. It is the largest city in Naushahro Feroze District with a population of about 142,685 as per 2023 Census of Pakistan. 408,148 people live in the Moro Taluka, 96% of whom speak the Sindhi language.

== Demographics ==
Population

Historical population
Year	Pop.	±% p.a.
1961	10,019	—
1972	19,132	+6.06%
1981	30,340	+5.26%
1998	61,033	+4.20%
2017	95,448	+2.38%
2023	142,685	+6.93%

According to 2023 census, Moro had a population of 142,685.

Languages

Languages of Moro MC (2023 Census)
1. Sindhi (90.5%)
2. Urdu (5.90%)
3. Punjabi (2.00%)
4. Others (1.60%)

== Educational Institutes ==
- Govt Mehran Degree College
- Govt High School Moro Town campus
- Govt Girl High School
- Govt Girls Degree College
- Bahria Foundation College
- The Educators - A Project of Beaconhouse
- IQRA P.H.S School Moro
- Intelligentsia Science College
- Habibia School of Hope. A school for orphans started by the late Shanaaz Omar Sayhebolay, funded by international and local donors.
- The Insight Model Public School Bandhi Road Moro.
