= Sakrand, Pakistan =

Pakistani town

Sakrand سکرنڈ سڪرنڊ
- Town
- Location within Sindh Location within Pakistan
- Coordinates: 26°8′17″N 68°16′23″E
- Country: Pakistan
- Province: Sindh
- Division: Shaheed Benazir Abad
- District: Nawabshah District
- Tehsil Status: 1858
- Founder: British Government

Government
  - Taluka chairman: Syed Uzair shah
- Elevation: 25 m (82 ft)

Population (2023)
  - Town Council: 72,040
- Time zone: UTC+5 (PST)
- Calling code: 0244
- Website: http://sba.gos.pk/rev-skd.php http://mysakrand.com

Sakrand (Urdu: سکرنڈ, Sindhi: سڪرنڊ) is a town located in Sindh province of Pakistan. It serves as a taluka in the Shaheed Benazir Abad District, formerly known as Nawabshah, situated approximately 18 kilometres from Nawabshah city. By road, Sakrand is around 300 kilometres away from Karachi on National Highway. The twined is known for its rich agriculture production.

== History ==
The historical town of Saklund is populated on both sides of National Highway, which was called Rawr (راوڙ وارو رستو), in old times. Whereas in the periods of the Talpur dynasty and British rule, it was called Tapali Rasto (ٽپالي رستو). In the initial time of British rule it was called Naar waro rasto. Sindhu darya flows about 18 km on the western side of Sakrand. There are various such signs from where it's clearly recognized that this old town is populated at the present location.

Sakrand was established a tehsil of Hyderabad district on 1858 by the British Government. On 1 Nov 1912, it was included in newly established Nawabshah district (now Shaheed Benazirabad). Sakrand was previously a sub-division headquarter of Nawabshah.

An important historical town due to the ruling periods of Kalhora rule and Talpur rule, Major General Haig mentions Sakrand in his book (The Indus Delta Country), whereas Albert William Hughes in his book, Sindh Gazetteer, has also mentioned the historical importance of Sakrand

== Demographics ==
Population

Historical population
Year	Pop.	±%
1972	12,716	—
1981	16,452	+29.4%
1998	27,056	+64.5%
2017	65,825	+143.3%
2023	72,040	+9.4%

According to 2023 census, Sakrand town had a population of 72,040.

Languages

Languages of Sakrand city (2023 Census)
1. Sindhi (84.8%)
2. Urdu (9.70%)
3. Punjabi (1.80%)
4. Balochi (1.40%)
5. Others (2.30%)

== Transport ==
Sakrand is home to Sakrand Junction railway station, that is abandoned by the Pakistan railway.

== Trade and business ==
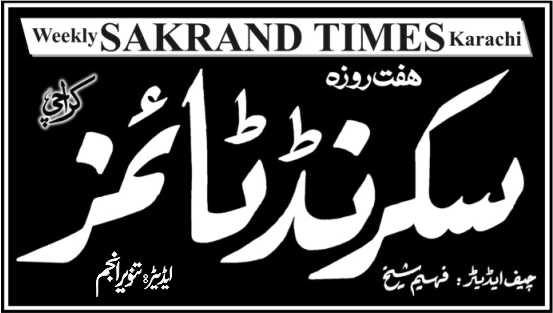
Sakrand times

Sakrand Sugar Mill Ltd. has a crushing capacity of 6,500 metric tons of sugarcane per day. The sugar mill not only fulfills domestic demand but it also has the capacity to export to other towns of the province.

- A newspaper, Sakrand Times, is published from Karachi.
- Iqbal flour mill, Nawabshah Road, Sakrand
- Anwer Ali Khero flour mill, Gt Road, Sakrand
- All Pakistan Banana and Furit market, Nawabshah Road, Sakrand
- All Sarafa Association, Sarafa Bazaar, Sakrand
- Imtiaz MObile Zone, Pro, Imtiaz Arain, خانزادہ Market, Sakrand

== Education ==
- Shaheed Benazir Bhutto University of Veterinary and Animal Sciences
- Academy of Excellence School near Sayed Villa, Khanzada Muhalla, Sakrand
- Agricultural Training Institute College, Sakrand
- Amanullah Noonari Karate School and Club, Main Road, Sakrand
- Bhoongar Public School, Azeem Colony, Sakrand
- Career Point Grammar School, Main Qazi Ahmed Road, Sakrand
- City Foundation School, Sakrand
- Creative Minds School, Qazi Ahmed Road, Sakrand
- Egale Public School, Jhanda Gali, Sakrand
- G R Unar Public School, Tanki Wali Gali, Sakrand
- Government Boys Degree College Sakrand
- Government Girls Degree College Sakrand
- Government Girls High School No. 1, Sakrand
- Government Girls High School No. 2, Sakrand
- Government High School Sakrand, Nawabshah
- Government Old Main Sindhi School, Old Sakrand, since 1902
- Government Shabbir Ahmed Shah Boys Morning And Evening School Sakrand
- Mehran Public School, Sindhri Chowk, Sakrand
- Millat Public School near Lilla Abad, Sakrand
- Modern Public School, Sakrand
- Nation Building School, Old Kazmi Center, Station Road, Sakrand
- Oxford Public School, Sakrand
- Sachal Foundation College, Kainat Nagar, Sakrand
- Sindh Leadership School Junior, Behind Chandia Petrol Pump, Sakrand www.sindhleadershipschools.edu.pk 03343003068
- Sindh Leadership School Senior, Wapda Colony, Sakrand www.sindhleadershipschools.edu.pk 03343003068
- Super English School, Azeem Colony, Sakrand
- Super Track Public School, Lilla Abad, Sakrand
