= Daur Taluka =

Daur Taluka تعلقہ دوڑ دؤڙ تعلقو
- Taluka (Tehsil)
- Location within Sindh Location within Pakistan
- Coordinates (26.458333°N 68.319167°E): 26°27′30″N 68°19′09″E
- Country: Pakistan
- Province: Sindh
- Division: Shaheed Benazir Abad
- District: Nawabshah District
- Taluka Status: 2004

Government
  - Type: Town Committee Daur
  - Chairman: Chaudhary Waseem Afzal Rajput

Population (2022)
  - City: 128,958
- Time zone: UTC+5 (PKT)
- Postal code: 67450

Daur is a town and headquarters of Daur taluka located in the district Shaheed Benazir Abad (Nawabshah), Sindh, Pakistan. Daur is a hub for agriculture and animal farms. It was badly damaged by the floods in 20.
