= Nawabshah =

City in Sindh, Pakistan

Nawabshah: نوابشاھ (Sindhi); نوابشاہ (Urdu)
- City
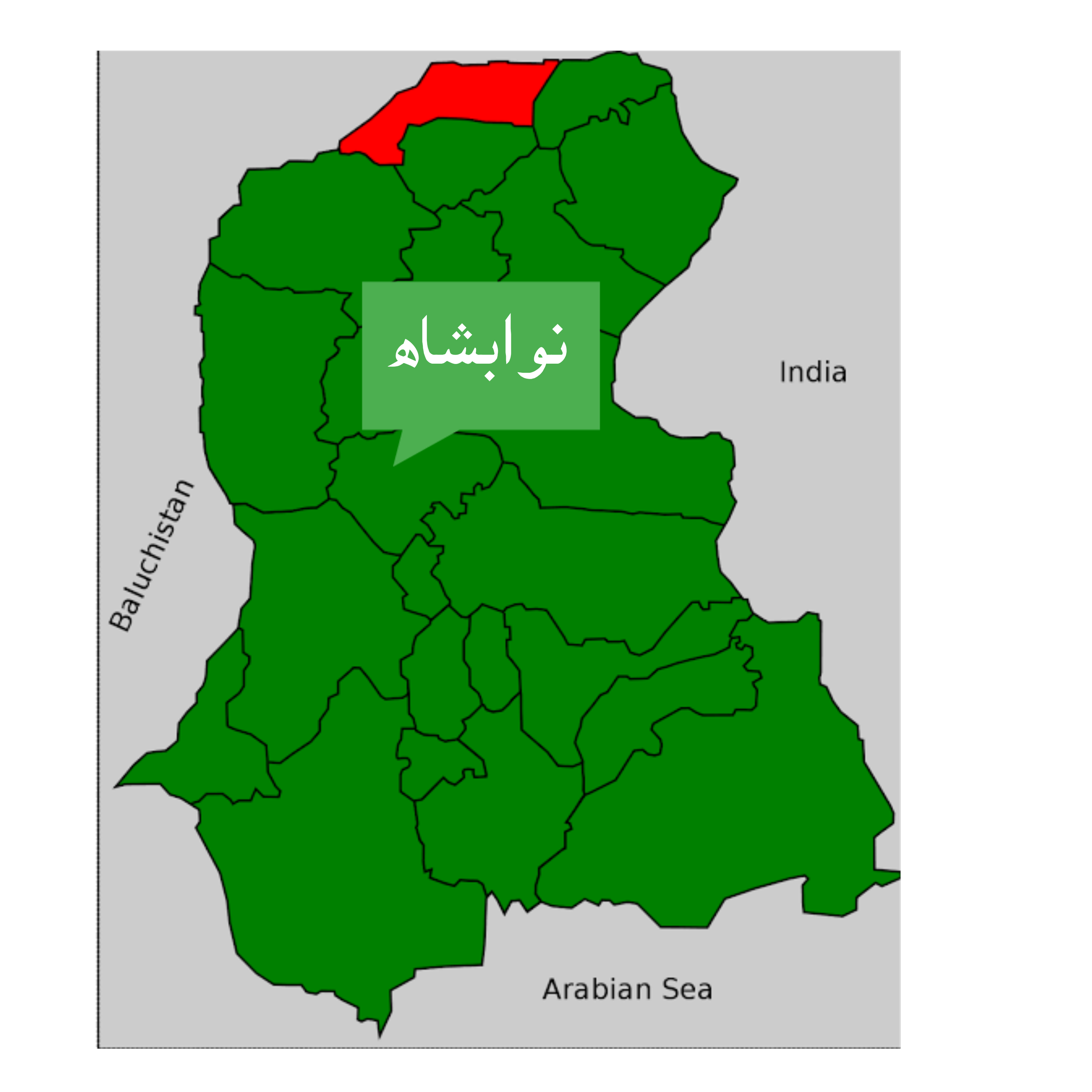

- Location of Nawabshah Nawabshah (Pakistan)
- Coordinates: 26°14′39″N 68°24′36″E
- Country: Pakistan
- Province: Sindh
- Old Name: Nasrat
- Division: Shaheed Benazir Abad
- District: Shaheed Benazirabad
- Taluka: Nawabshah

Government
  - Type: Municipal Corporation
  - Body: Municipal Corporation Benazirabad
  - Mayor: Mr. Muhammad Rasheed Bhutt
  - Deputy Mayor: Mr. Mubasher Ali
- Municipal Corporation Towns: H.M Khoja Town & Nawabshah Town
- Elevation: 31 m (102 ft)

Population (2023 census)
  - City: 363,138
  - Rank: 26th in Pakistan, 5th in Sindh
- Time zone: UTC+5 (PST)
- Postal code of Pakistan: 67450
- Calling code: 0244
- Established: 1903
- Founded by: British government

Nawabshah (Note: Sindhi: نوابشاھ, Urdu: نوابشاہ) is a city and also the headquarter of Nawabshah Tehsil in Shaheed Benazirabad District of Sindh province, Pakistan. This city is situated in the middle of Sindh province. It is the 27th most populous city in Pakistan. Nawabshah is called the heart of Sindh province.

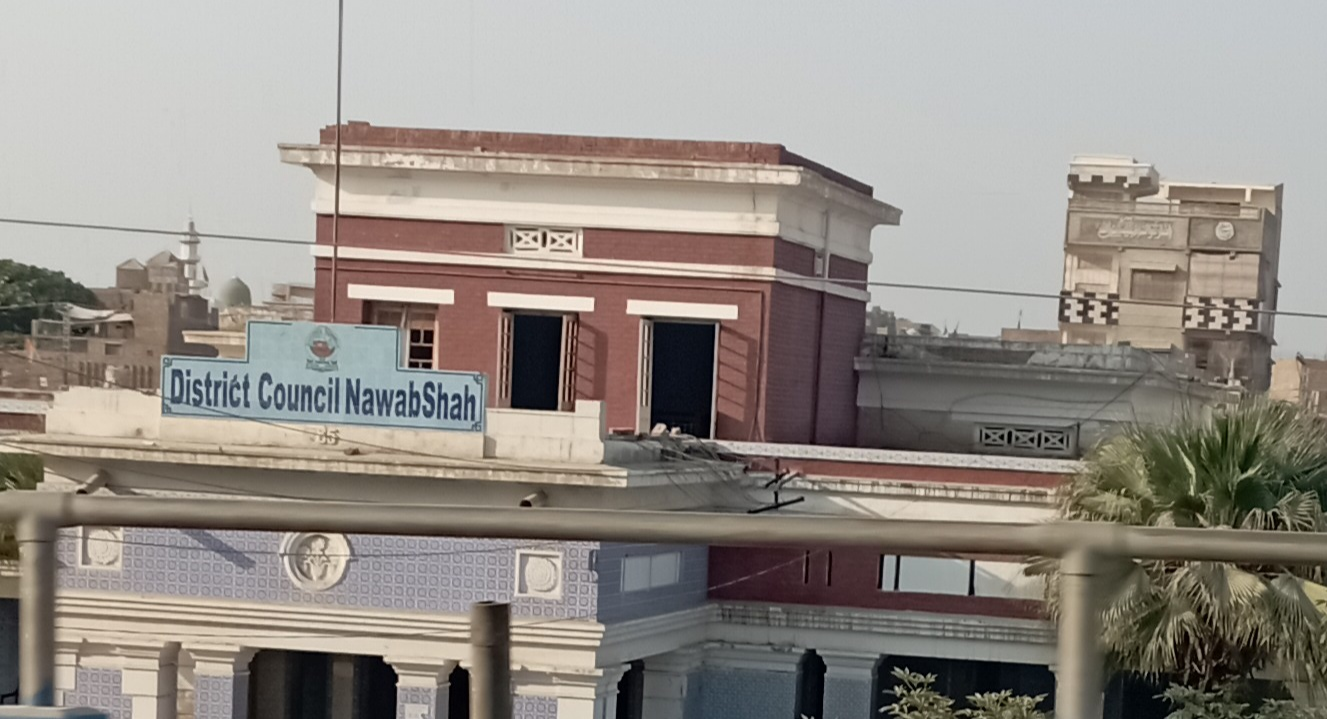
The District Council building of Nawabshah.

== History ==
=== 18th–19th century CE ===
Nawabshah lies near the Indus River in central Sindh, long inhabited since the Indus Valley era. Archaeological surveys note prehistoric and Harappan remains in the area, and the region later passed under various Muslim dynasties. In particular, the 18th–19th-century Kalhora and Talpur dynasties left many mosques and tombs with characteristic Sindhi and Islamic architecture.

=== British Raj ===
Under British rule, Nawabshah was carved out of Hyderabad District. Its taluka (subdivision) was established in 1903, and on 1 November 1912, Nawabshah was upgraded to full district status in Sindh. The town was named for Syed Nawab Shah, a local landowner who migrated there in 1881, his family donated land of 60 acres for colonial-era district offices, and in recognition of this generosity, the British named the town after him.

=== After independence of 1947 ===
After 1947, Nawabshah became part of independent Pakistan. In 2008, the district was officially renamed Shaheed Benazirabad in memory of Benazir Bhutto. In recent years, the city has grown rapidly.

== Demographics ==
Population

Historical population

Year	Pop.	±% p.a.
1951	34,201	—
1961	45,651	+2.93%
1972	81,045	+5.36%
1981	102,139	+2.60%

Year	Pop.	±% p.a.
1998	189,244	+3.69%
2017	279,338	+2.07%
2023	363,138	+4.47%

According to 2023 census, Nawabshah had a population of 363,138. Nawabshah is inhabited by various communities and tribes. The region's electoral politics have traditionally been shaped by these influential families, often with the support of smaller local communities.

=== Languages ===
Languages of Nawabshah City (Municipal Committee) (2023 census)
1. Sindhi (60.0%)
2. Urdu (24.1%)
3. Punjabi (9.90%)
4. Brahui (1.60%)
5. Balochi (1.60%)
6. Saraiki (1.00%)
7. Others (1.80%)

In the 2023 Census of Pakistan, Sindhi was the dominant first language in Nawabshah City, being spoken by 60% of the population. It was followed by Urdu language at 24.1%, Punjabi at 9.9%, while 1.6% spoke Brahui,1.6% spoke Balochi, 1.0% spoke Saraiki and an additional diverse 1.80% of the population spoke other languages of Pakistan (mostly Pashto and Hindko). (Note: Data taken from the Urban Population of Nawabshah Taluka as it perfectly corresponds with Nawabshah MC borders and population)

=== Area and population 2014 ===
Area	4,239 square km
Population	1,435,130
Male	749,275
Female	685,855
Population (below 15 Years)	45%
Population (between 15 and 65 years)	52.2%
Muslim population	94.1%
Hindu population	4.2%

== Climate ==
Nawabshah

Climate chart (precipitation, max. and min. temperature)
J	F	M	A	M	J	J	A	S	O	N	D
2 24 6	2 27 9	3 33 14	13 39 20	11 44 25	38 43 28	82 40 28	65 39 26	40 38 24	33 37 18	2 32 12	3 26 7
- █ Average max. and min. temperatures in °C
- █ Precipitation totals in mm
- Source: Hong Kong Observatory
Imperial conversion
J	F	M	A	M	J	J	A	S	O	N	D
0.1 76 43	0.1 81 48	0.1 92 58	0.5 103 67	0.4 110 76	1.5 110 82	3.2 105 82	2.6 101 79	1.6 101 75	1.3 99 65	0.1 89 54	0.1 78 45
- █ Average max. and min. temperatures in °F
- █ Precipitation totals in inches

Nawabshah has a hot arid climate (Köppen BWh). The city is considered one of the hottest cities in Pakistan, with summer temperatures soaring as high as 53 °C or 127.4 °F. Temperatures above 45 °C or 113 °F are fairly common during late May and June. Winters start late, around mid-November, lasting to around mid-February, with night-time temperatures often reaching 4 °C or 39.2 °F, and temperatures below 0 °C or 32 °F occurring two or three times on average in January.

The highest temperatures each year in Pakistan, typically rising to above 50 °C (122 °F), are usually recorded in Nawabshah District and Sibi from May to August. The climate is generally dry and hot, but sometimes the temperature falls to 0 °C (32 °F). On 26 May 2010 record breaking severe heat wave hit the city and the mercury level reached 52 °C (126 °F) which was the highest temperature ever recorded in Nawabshah at the time. The climate is generally dry and hot, but sometimes the temperature falls to 0 °C (32 °F). On 7 January 2011, temperatures dropped to 4 °C (39 °F) in the city. The highest annual rainfall ever is 685 millimetres or 27 inches, recorded in 2022.

Climate data for Nawabshah (1991–2020)
Month	Jan	Feb	Mar	Apr	May	Jun	Jul	Aug	Sep	Oct	Nov	Dec	Year
Record high °C (°F)	33.7 (92.7)	38.0 (100.4)	45.5 (113.9)	49.0 (120.2)	51.0 (123.8)	50.5 (122.9)	47.5 (117.5)	48.9 (120.0)	44.5 (112.1)	43.0 (109.4)	41.0 (105.8)	35.0 (95.0)	51.0 (123.8)
Mean daily maximum °C (°F)	24.1 (75.4)	28.1 (82.6)	34.1 (93.4)	40.6 (105.1)	44.6 (112.3)	44.1 (111.4)	41.0 (105.8)	39.1 (102.4)	38.9 (102.0)	37.9 (100.2)	32.2 (90.0)	26.2 (79.2)	35.9 (96.6)
Daily mean °C (°F)	15.4 (59.7)	18.7 (65.7)	24.5 (76.1)	30.4 (86.7)	34.8 (94.6)	35.4 (95.7)	34.2 (93.6)	32.6 (90.7)	31.7 (89.1)	28.6 (83.5)	22.7 (72.9)	17.2 (63.0)	27.2 (80.9)
Mean daily minimum °C (°F)	6.6 (43.9)	9.4 (48.9)	14.8 (58.6)	20.3 (68.5)	25.0 (77.0)	27.5 (81.5)	27.4 (81.3)	26.2 (79.2)	24.4 (75.9)	19.3 (66.7)	13.1 (55.6)	8.3 (46.9)	18.5 (65.3)
Record low °C (°F)	−2.6 (27.3)	−3.6 (25.5)	3.0 (37.4)	7.0 (44.6)	15.0 (59.0)	17.0 (62.6)	20.0 (68.0)	18.9 (66.0)	14.6 (58.3)	7.5 (45.5)	2.8 (37.0)	−1.0 (30.2)	−3.6 (25.5)
Average rainfall mm (inches)	2.5 (0.10)	4.9 (0.19)	3.2 (0.13)	12.2 (0.48)	22.8 (0.90)	39.2 (1.54)	69.1 (2.72)	87.2 (3.43)	32.7 (1.29)	13.1 (0.52)	0.4 (0.02)	3.3 (0.13)	247.6 (9.75)
Average rainy days (≥ 1.0 mm)	0.6	0.6	0.7	0.5	0.4	3.5	4.7	5.5	2.2	0.3	0.1	0.4	19.5
Mean monthly sunshine hours	230.1	240.1	267.0	274.4	293.8	268.8	229.4	240.9	261.1	280.0	256.1	—	—
Source: NOAA Ogimet

== Major education institutes ==
Educational institutions in the city include:

- Bakhtawar Cadet College For Girls Shaheed Benazirabad
- Nuclear Medicine Oncology & Radiotherapy Institute Nawabshah
- People's University of Medical & Health Sciences for Women
- Quaid-e-Azam Law College Nawabshah
- Quaid-e-Awam University of Engineering, Science & Technology
- Shaheed Benazir Bhutto University of Veterinary and Animal Sciences
- Shaheed Benazir Bhutto University, Sheringal

== Sports locations ==
- Bilawal Cricket Stadium
- Askari Hockey Stadium

== See also ==
- Climate of Pakistan
- Climate of Sindh
- Bahria Town Nawabshah
