= Pakistan's response to the revocation of the special status of Jammu and Kashmir =

Pakistan's response to the revocation of the special status of Jammu and Kashmir started immediately after the revocation by India on 5 August 2019.

== 2019 ==
On 6 August 2019 the Pakistan Foreign Office issued a statement stating, "As a party to this international dispute, Pakistan will exercise all possible options to counter the illegal steps." It called the revocation a "unilateral step". On 6 August 2019, after a commanders meeting, Pakistan's army chief said that Pakistan Army stood by the Kashmiris in their just struggle to the very end and that the army would "go to any extent" to support the people of Kashmir. An emergency joint parliamentary sitting of the National Assembly and the Senate to discuss the situation was called. On 7 August, the joint parliamentary sitting passed a resolution to condemn India's move and called it "illegal, unilateral, reckless and coercive attempt to alter the disputed status of Indian administered Kashmir as enshrined in the UNSC resolutions".

On 7 August, a meeting of the National Security Committee decided to downgrade Pakistan's diplomatic relations with India. Pakistan's High Commissioner to India was recalled and the Indian High Commissioner to Pakistan was expelled. The next day, Pakistan's Minister for Railways Sheikh Rasheed Ahmad suspended the Samjhauta Express train service and the Thar Express. The Ministry of Information and Broadcasting decided to ban all cultural exchanges with India, including banning the screening of Indian films and dramas inside Pakistan. On 9 August 2019, Pakistan formally suspended a large part of its trade relations with India and banned all exports and import to/from India.

On 10 August 2019, all public transport links between the two countries were severed because of Pakistani protests. This included the suspension of the Delhi-Lahore Bus, Poonch–Rawalakot Bus and Srinagar–Muzaffarabad Bus services. The only way for travelers to make this journey is to cross on foot at Wagah.

On 11 August 2019, Prime Minister Imran Khan compared the Indian government to "Nazis". He alleged that India was attempting to change the demography of the Muslim majority Kashmir through ethnic cleansing. Pakistan's foreign minister Shah Mehmood Qureshi issued a statement on Tuesday 13 August 2019 that he had written a letter to the president of the United Nations Security Council with a request to convene an emergency meeting of the council to discuss India's "illegal actions that violate UN resolutions on Kashmir". The foreign minister also called for circulation of the letter among members of the Security Council.

On 20 August 2019, Pakistan announced that it will take the dispute to the International Court of Justice, adding that its case would centre on alleged human rights violations by India.

On 14 September 2019, However, Minister of Law and Justice Farogh Naseem said approaching the ICJ on Jammu and Kashmir is not possible for their country.

== 2020 ==
In 2020, media reports started emerging of preparation for Pakistan's pro-Kashmir campaigning on 5 August well before the date. Prime Minister Imran Khan came out with a "18-point plan" for commemorating the anniversary which includes mention of the Inter-Services Intelligence. This includes a media trip to Kashmir, and one for the United Nations Military Observer Group in India and Pakistan who will also be given a white paper. Pakistani news channels will cover the "Black Day" and logos will be modified accordingly while newspaper will carry relevant material. All Pakistani embassies will also hold protests. Outreach to Kuala Lumpur, Ankara and Beijing is also in the plan. Imran Khan will also make a live speech from Kashmir on the occasion.

On 4 August, Pakistan's government released an updated political map which included Pakistan's territorial claims on Jammu and Kashmir, Ladakh, the Siachen Glacier, the eastern banks of Sir Creek, as well as Junagadh and Manavadar in India's Gujarat region. The map also annotated Ladakh's boundary with China as "frontier undefined", whose status would be formalised by "the sovereign authorities concerned after the settlement of the Jammu and Kashmir dispute." The map was adopted for official use throughout Pakistan. The government renamed the Kashmir Highway, which runs through Islamabad, as Srinagar Highway. On the occasion of the one-year anniversary of the revocation of Kashmir's special status, Pakistan also observed 5 August as Youm-e-Istehsal ("Day of Exploitation") nationally. Rallies and seminars were arranged to express solidarity with Kashmiris.
