= Attari Sham Singh railway station =

Railway station in Punjab, India

Attari Sham Singh Railway Station
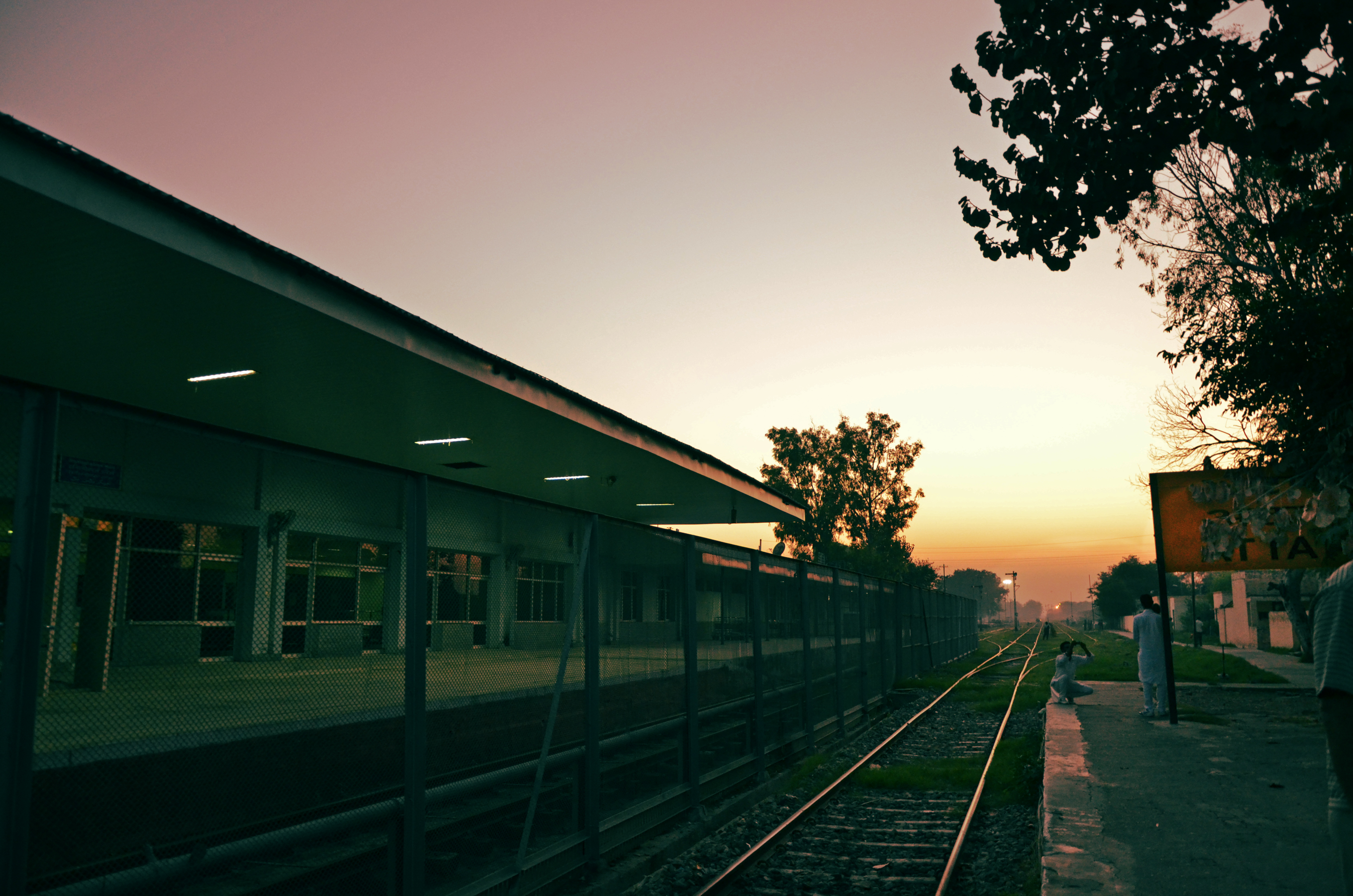
- Attari station looking towards Pakistan, with goods custom depot (left)

General information
- Location: Railways Road, Attari Village, Amritsar district, Punjab, India; India
- Coordinates: 31°35′39″N 74°36′24″E
- Elevation: 231.52 metres (759.6 ft)
- System: Indian Railways station
- Owner: Indian Railways
- Operator: Northern Railway
- Line: Ambala–Attari line
- Platforms: 3
- Tracks: 4

Construction
- Structure type: Standard on ground
- Parking: Yes
- Cycle facilities: No

Other information
- Status: Functioning
- Station code: ATT
- Zone(s): Northern Railway
- Division(s): Firozpur

History
- Opened: 1862

Services
Preceding station	Indian Railways	Following station
Khasa towards ?	Northern Railway zone Ambala–Attari line	Terminus
Location
- Location within Punjab

Attari Sham Singh Railway Station is located in Amritsar district in the Indian state of Punjab and serves Attari and the Wagah border with Pakistan.

In May 2015, Government of Punjab changed the name of station to Attari Sham Singh railway station after Sham Singh Attariwala who was general in the Sikh Empire.

Both Passport and visa are required to enter this station.

== The railway station ==
Attari railway station is at an elevation of 231.52 metres (759.6 ft) and was assigned the code – ATT.

Attari is the last station in India on the Amritsar–Lahore line.

== History ==
The Scinde, Punjab & Delhi Railway completed the Multan–Lahore–Amritsar line in 1865. Amritsar–Attari section was completed on the route to Lahore in 1862.

== Trans-Asian Railway ==
Currently, all freight traffic originating from Asia destined for Europe goes by sea. The Trans-Asian Railway will enable containers from Singapore, China, Vietnam, Cambodia, India, Bangladesh, Myanmar, Thailand and Korea to travel over land by train to Europe. The Southern Corridor of the Trans-Asian Railway is of prime interest to India. It connects Yunnan in China and Thailand with Europe via Turkey and passes through India.

The proposed route will enter India through Tamu and Moreh in Manipur bordering Myanmar, then enter Bangladesh through Mahisasan and Shabajpur and again enter India from Bangladesh at Gede. On the western side, the line will enter Pakistan at Attari. There is a 315 kilometres (196 mi) missing link on this route in the India–Myanmar sector; of this, 180 kilometres (110 mi), in India, is between Jiribam in Manipur and Tamu in Myanmar. The rail link between Jiribam and Imphal has been sanctioned by Indian Railways, but that is unlikely to be completed before 2016. At present construction work is in progress in a 97 kilometres (60 mi) stretch between Jiribam and Tupul.

== Station layout ==
G	Street level	Exit/Entrance & ticket counter
P1	FOB, Side platform, No-1 doors will open on the left/right
P1	Track 1
P1	Track 2
P1	FOB, Island platform, No- 2 doors will open on the left/right
P1	Island platform, No- 3 doors will open on the left/right
P1	Track 3

== Major trains ==
Some of the important trains that runs from Attari are:

- Samjhauta Express
- Amritsar–Attari DEMU
- Jabalpur–Attari Special Fare Special
- Amritsar–Attari Passenger

== See also ==
- Attari
- Indian Railways
- Wagah railway station
- Amritsar Junction railway station
- Northern Railway zone
- Ambala–Attari line
- List of railway stations in India
- India–Pakistan relations
- Transport between India and Pakistan
