= Transport between India and Pakistan =

Transport between India and Pakistan has been developed for tourism and commercial purposes and bears much historical and political significance for both countries, which have possessed few transport links since the partition of India in 1947. In 2019, all public transport links between the two countries were severed because of Pakistani protest at India's revocation of the special status of Jammu and Kashmir. The only way for travelers to make this journey is to cross on foot at Wagah.

== Background ==
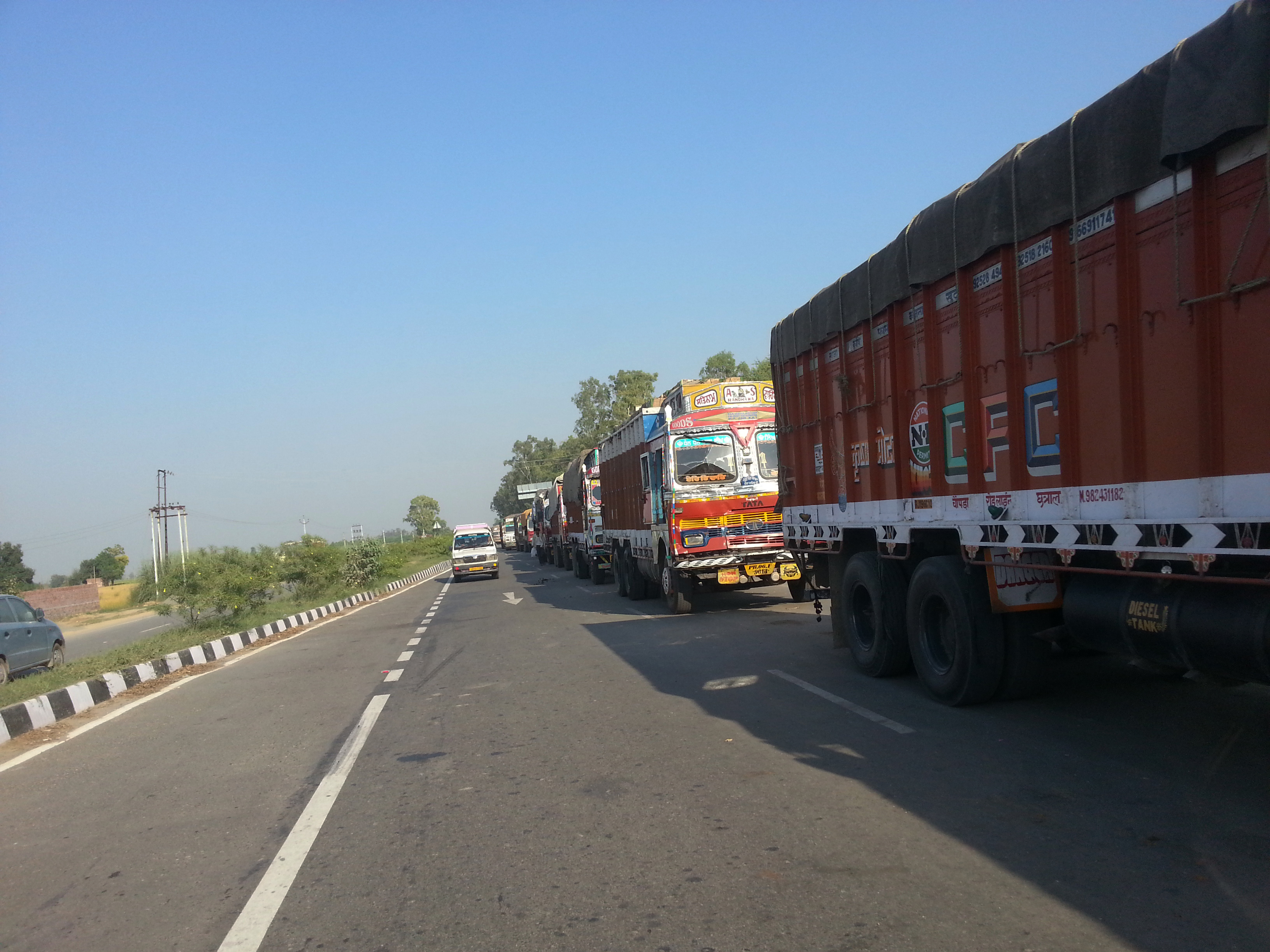
Trucks on National Highway 1 (India), waiting to cross Wagah Border

The partition of India in 1947 led to the termination of most transport links between the newly independent nations of India and Pakistan. The Indo-Pakistani War of 1947–1948 had similarly divided the state of Jammu and Kashmir between the two rivals, causing termination of road links in the region. The line of control and the international border in the divided region of Jammu and Kashmir and Punjab were major theatres of war during the Indo-Pakistani Wars of 1965 and 1971. The train connecting the Indian city of Jaipur with the Pakistani city of Karachi across the Thar Desert was destroyed when the Pakistani Air Force bombed the tracks during the 1965 war. In the 1990s, the Line of Control (LoC) demarcating the informal boundary along disputed region of Jammu and Kashmir was the scene of exchanges of fire between Pakistani and Indian forces and infiltration of militants into the Indian side. The Kargil War of 1999 broke out when Indian force sought to repel militants and Pakistani soldiers who had infiltrated across the LoC.

In 1977, both nations launched the Samjhauta Express connecting the Indian city of Attari with the Pakistani city of Lahore. Since the successful launch of the Delhi-Lahore Bus in 1999, both nations have worked to established multiple bus and train services connecting cities across the borders in the Punjab region, Sindh, Rajasthan as well as between disputed region of Jammu and Kashmir across the Line of Control (LoC) – the boundary line denoting rival areas of control in the disputed region of Jammu and Kashmir, which is not an official international border. India and Pakistan have no official trade relations due to ongoing tensions.

== Bus services ==
The Delhi-Lahore Bus is a passenger bus service connecting the Indian capital of Delhi with the city of Lahore, Pakistan via the border transit post at Wagah, which is the only border crossing point between India and Pakistan opened for international travelers. The bus was of symbolic importance to the efforts of the governments of both nations to foster peaceful and friendly relations. In its inaugural run on 19 February 1999, the bus carried the then-Indian Prime Minister Atal Bihari Vajpayee, who was to attend a summit in Lahore and was received by his Pakistani counterpart, Nawaz Sharif at Wagah. Its official name is the Sada-e-Sarhad (Urdu for Call of the Frontier). The duration of the entire journey is eight hours, covering a distance of 530 km (329 mi). While the bus service had continued to run during the Kargil War of 1999, it was suspended in the aftermath of the 2001 Indian Parliament attack on 13 December 2001, which the Indian government accused Pakistan of instigating. The bus service was resumed on 16 July 2003 when bilateral relations had improved. This service was suspended in 2019, as a result of Pakistani protest at the revocation of the special status of Jammu and Kashmir.

In 2003, after a ceasefire in Kashmir improved bilateral relations, the two governments worked on the proposal for a bus connecting the city of Srinagar (India) to the city of Muzaffarabad (Pakistan) (Srinagar–Muzaffarabad Bus). The official agreement was promulgated on 16 February 2005 when the then-Indian Minister of External Affairs K. Natwar Singh visited Pakistani President Pervez Musharaff in Rawalpindi, Pakistan. The decision was announced along with agreements on establishing the Thar Express train service. The bus ran a distance of 183 kilometres and was officially launched on 7 April 2005 and was flagged-off by the Indian Prime Minister Dr. Manmohan Singh. The service was suspended for after 2005 Kashmir earthquake due to after effects of road damage.

A bus service connecting Poonch (India) with Rawalkote (Pakistan) over 55 km was also launched on 20 June 2006. On 5 June 2008 the passenger quota on the Poonch–Rawalkote bus was doubled. Bus services connecting Kargil (India) with Skardu (Pakistan), Jammu (India) with Sialkot (Pakistan) and Mirpur (Pakistan) are also being planned.

The Indian official position viewed the Srinagar–Muzaffarabad bus service as a "humanitarian measure without prejudice" and not affecting the rival policies and stands of the two governments on the Kashmir dispute. Both governments announced that Indian and Pakistani citizens could travel anywhere in Indian Jammu and Kashmir and Pakistani Azad Kashmir, including the Northern Areas of Pakistan, which are part of India's claim on Jammu and Kashmir and pre-1947 Jammu and Kashmir. In India, all citizens would have to apply at the Regional Passport Office in Srinagar, which was the designated authority to evaluate applications, verify identities and issue entry permits. As of 25 September 2019 all transport routes have been closed between India and Pakistan after India revoked the special status of Jammu and Kashmir.

== Rail services ==
As per the Shimla Agreement of 1972 and in a bid to restore peaceful ties after the Indo-Pakistani War of 1971, both nations launched the Samjhauta Express (Samjhauta means "accord" or "compromise" in Hindi and Urdu), connecting the Pakistani city of Lahore with the Indian town of Attari, which is close proximity to the city of Amritsar. The Thar Express was launched to connect the Pakistani city of Karachi through the Khokhrapar station and the Indian city of Jodhpur through the Munabao station. Plans and negotiations are underway to launch a train service connecting the Pakistani city of Sialkot with the Indian city of Jammu.

On 18 February 2007, 2 carriages of the train experienced alleged terrorist bombings near Panipat, Haryana in India. The 2007 Samjhauta Express bombings claimed lives of 68 people. Both the Indian and Pakistani governments condemned the attack, and officials on both sides speculated that the perpetrators intended to disrupt improving relations between the two nations, There have been a number of breaks in the investigation of the bombings. As of 2011, nobody has been charged for the crime yet. It has been allegedly linked to Abhinav Bharat, a Hindu fundamentalist group in India. Other allegations also concurred on Lashkar-e-Taiba (a Pakistani-based terrorist organization). A United States report declared Arif Qasmani to be involved in the attack. The Thar Express is the other passenger railway link between the two countries, running from Karachi, Pakistan to Jodhpur, Rajasthan, India. It was not discontinued after Partition but was after the Indo-Pakistani War of 1965. On 18 February 2006, it was revived after a period of 41 years.

In 2019, as a result of the revocation of the special status of Jammu and Kashmir, Pakistan's railway minister Sheikh Rasheed decreed that there would be no more rail transport links between India and Pakistan.

== See also ==
- Borders of India
- Railways
  - Geostrategic border rail lines of India
  - List of railway stations in Punjab
- General
  - Aerial lift in India
  - Road transport in J&K
  - Transport in India
