= Pakistan, India =

Village in Purnia district, Bihar

Pakistan
- Village
- Location within Bihar Location within India
- Coordinates: 25.9384°N 87.4034°E
- Country: India
- State: Bihar
- District: Purnia
- Named for: Pakistan (country)

Government
  - Type: Panchayati Raj
  - Body: Gram Panchayat
- Demonym: Pakistani

Languages
  - Official: Maithili, Hindi
- Time zone: UTC+5:30 (IST)
- ISO 3166 code: IN-BR

Pakistan is a village located in Purnia district, Bihar, India. It is named after the country of Pakistan in memory of its Muslim residents who migrated to erstwhile East Pakistan (present-day Bangladesh) after the Partition of India in August 1947. Although the village's district shared a common land border with what was East Pakistan at the time of Partition, its present-day Purnia district does not border Bangladesh. The village today does not have any Muslims or mosques and is mainly populated by Hindu tribals.

Despite repeated appeals from the local community to rename the village Birsa Nagar in tribute to Birsa Munda, the Indian government has not yet acted on the matter.

== History ==
Purnia district was part of the Bihar Province of the British Raj before its dissolution in August 1947, when British India was partitioned into the Hindu-majority Dominion of India and the Muslim-majority Dominion of Pakistan.

While remaining in India itself, Purnia was in close proximity to the newly created exclave of East Pakistan, prompting many Muslims to migrate there. Before their departure, the Muslim residents handed over their property and other assets to their Hindu neighbours, who subsequently renamed the village "Pakistan" in their memory. Prior to the Indian States Reorganisation Act of 1956, the district of Purnia shared a land border with East Pakistan, which ceased to exist after Islampur subdivision was transferred to the state of West Bengal.

== Geography ==
The village lies some 30 km (19 mi) from Purnia, the district headquarters, and is located in Srinagar Block.

== Demographics ==
Following the Partition of India in 1947, the village ceased to have any Muslim residents; the inhabitants of the village today are Hindus. Pakistan village's residents largely belong to the Santal tribe, the largest tribal group in India. The village today is poverty-stricken and reportedly lacks basic facilities including roads, schools and hospitals. The literacy rate of the district is 35.51%.

== Naming controversy ==
Relations between the states of India and Pakistan have historically been turbulent. The immense violence between Hindus and Muslims that occurred as a consequence of the Partition of India left millions dead and sowed the seeds of discontent between both sides. Following the Partition and subsequent independence from the United Kingdom, the two countries have fought several wars, primarily stemming from their territorial dispute over the Himalayan region of Kashmir, which is more or less claimed in full by both nations.

Residents of neighbouring villages refer to the people of Pakistan village as "Pakistanis" and, due to the local stigma associated with this term, refuse to allow women to marry men from this village. There have been requests submitted to rename the village to "Birsa Nagar", although the submissions have not been acted on by the Indian government.
