= Attari =

Border city in Punjab, India

- Village
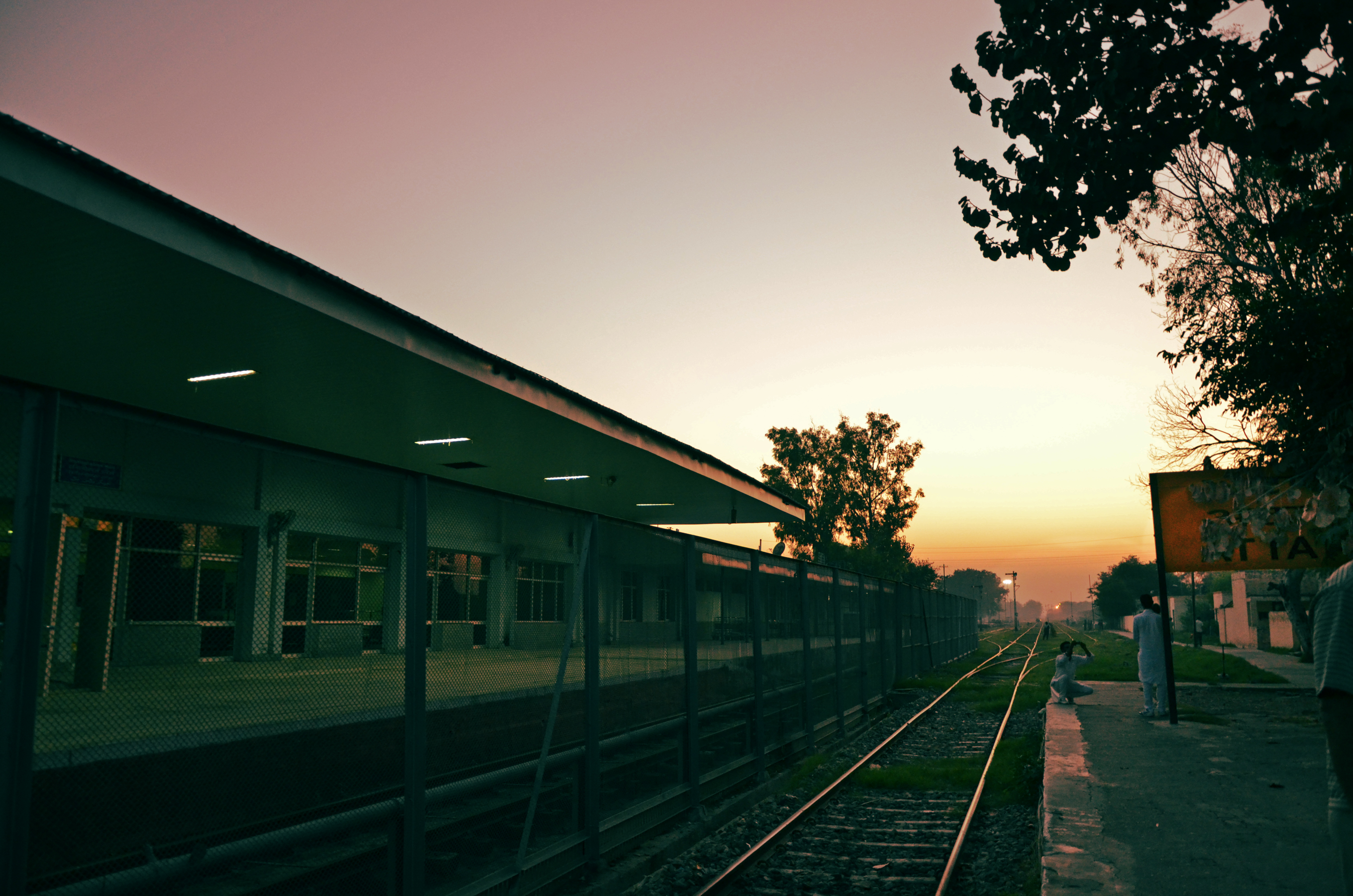
- Attari railway station, looking towards Pakistan, with goods custom depot (left)

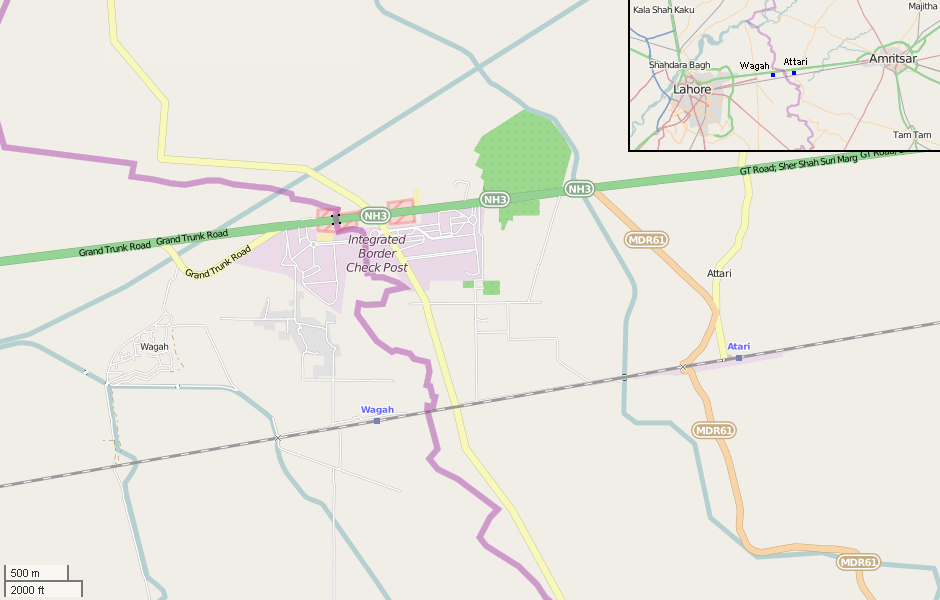
- OSM map showing Attari and Wagah, their railway stations, and the Wagah border crossing. In the upper corner is shown the position of the villages between the cities of Lahore and Amritsar (click to expand)

- Location within Punjab Location within India
- Coordinates: 31°36′03″N 74°36′20″E
- Country: India
- State: Punjab
- District: Amritsar
- Time zone: UTC+5:30 (IST)

Attari, also spelled Atari, is a village of Amritsar district in the Punjab state of India, 3 km from the Indo-Pakistani border at Wagah. It is situated 25 km west of the Sikh holy city of Amritsar, and is the last Indian station on the rail route connecting Lahore, Pakistan with the Indian capital Delhi. Attari village was the native village of Sardar Sham Singh Attariwala, one of the generals in the Army of Maharaja Ranjit Singh.

== History ==
Attari village, in the Majha Region, was founded by two Sidhu Jat brothers, by the name of Gaur Singh and Kaur Singh around 1740. They were the sons of Chaudhri Kahn Chand Sidhu of village Kaonke in Ludhiana (Malwa). The two brothers immigrated to the Majha Region beyond the Sutlej River. Firstly the found another village, by the name of Kaunke (Amtitsar). Later a famous local ascetic named Mool Dass pointed the brothers towards a large mound ("theh" in Punjabi), and asked them to establish a new village. Gaura got built a attari (three-storey house), on the mound and later on a village developed around the attari.

Then the brothers were known as simply Gaura and Kaura. Later on they heard the gallantry and braveness of the tough and hardriding Majha Sikhs, who were fighting guerrilla warfare against the crumbling Lahore-based Mughal authorities. They went to Amritsar, and at the Akal Bunga (Akal Takhat), both Sidhu brothers took Khande De Pahul, and became Gaur Singh and Kaur Singh (Sikhs). The brothers joined the jatha (band) of Jathedar Baba Gurbakash Singh, a famous brave Sikh Sandhu Jatt warrior of village Roranwala Kalan some 1 mile from Attari village.

The Sikhs would attack and plunder Mughal treasures and seize goods such as weapons and horses. The Sidhu Attari family joined the Bhangi Misl (Sikh Confederacy) in their captures of Lahore and other places and took part in the establishment of Sikh Misl rule in central Panjab. From the 1750s to 1803 the family remained loyal to the Sikh Bhangi Misl.

From 1802 to 1803, Sardar Nihal Singh (died 1818) of Attari family would loot and plunder the treasures of Maharaja Ranjit Singh of Lahore, In retaliation of the Maharaja, invading and putting an end to the once-dominant Bhangi Sikh Misl in the Majha Region. Sardar Sham Singh Attari (1785–1846), from this family was the great fallen hero of the Battle of Sabhraon 10 February 1846, of First Anglo Sikh Wars. Second Sikh rebellion of 1848–49, was also led by Attari family members, namely Sardar Chattar Singh Sidhu and his young son, Sardar Sher Singh Sidhu Attariwala, which resulted in British victory over the Sikhs.

When the British abolished old Pargana system in 1849, they created modern districts and Attari village was in 1849–1855 added to Lahore District. But in 1855 it was added to Amritsar District and remains so to this present day.

In 1862, the British Government joined Lahore and Amritsar by railway line. Modernisation of Punjab had started in 1850s with the building of large and small canals (Nehar in Punjabi). This railway line would pass through the north of Attari village. The railway line was completed in 1865.

Attari Sikh Sardars were well known for their bravery and gallantry. The British said in 1865 that the Sikh Sardars of Attari are the best blood of the Manjha (Majha).

Over the years, trade regulation between the India and Pakistan have been eased, especially after 2007, annual trade through road increased from Rs 6.5 billion in 2007 to Rs 15 billion in 2010–11. After the Integrated Check Post (ICP) was opened at Attari on 13 April 2012 to improve road trade, around 500 trucks have been crossing the border every day.

It is the starting point of the National Highway 1, part of the historic Grand Trunk Road and is also part of AH1, the longest route of the Asian Highway Network. The Samjhauta Express, the train service that actually crosses the international border, the only train that runs from Attari railway station to Wagah, Pakistan a distance of 3 km.

Administratively Attari is one of the five sub-Tehsil and a block in Amritsar district. It is one of the nine Vidhan Sabha (legislative assembly) segments within Amritsar Lok Sabha constituency.

== Politics ==
The city is part of the Attari Assembly Constituency.

== Tourism ==
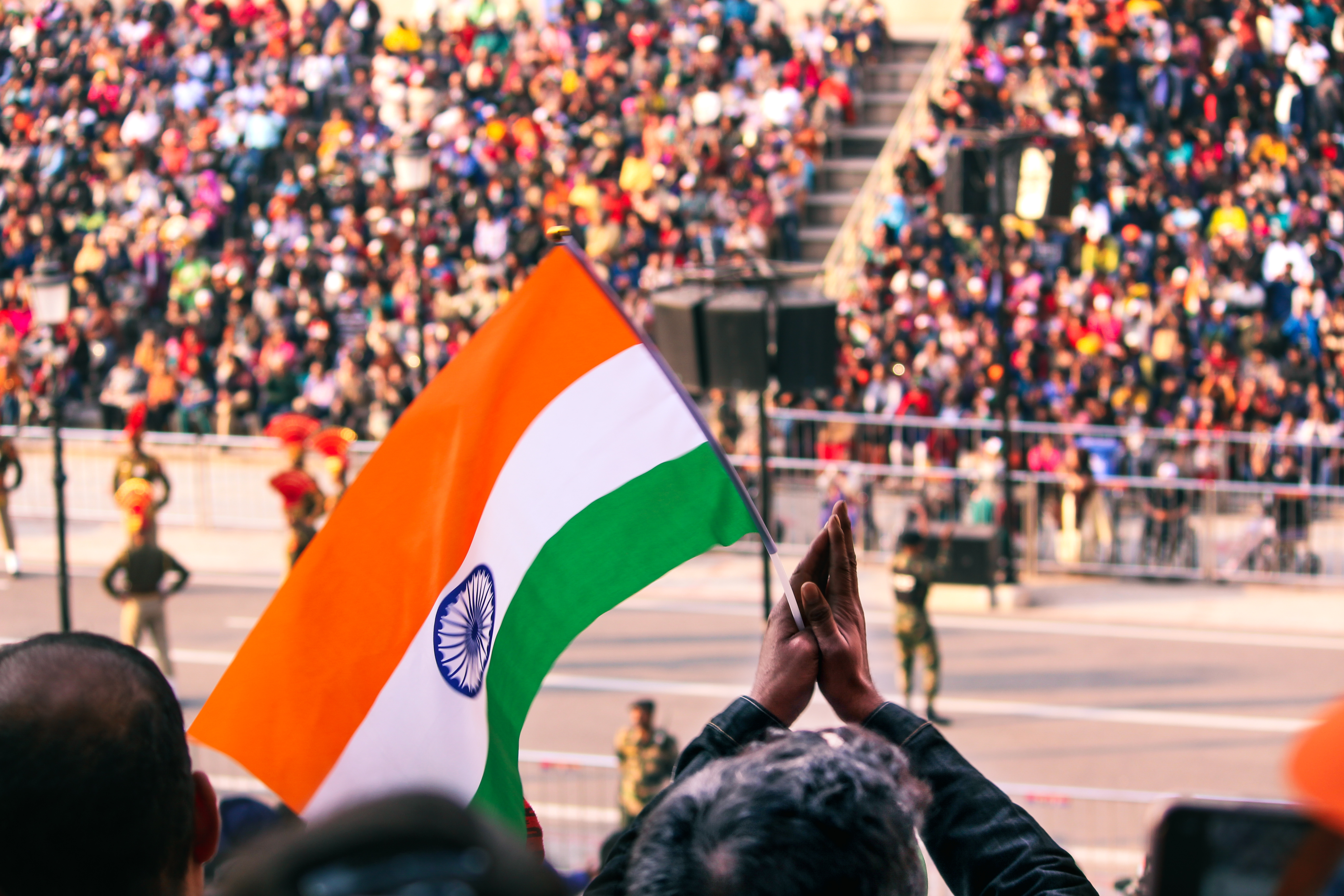
Attari Border

- Wagah - Attari border ceremony

== Transport ==
=== Trans-Asian Railway ===
Currently, all freight traffic originating from Asia destined for Europe goes by sea. The Trans-Asian Railway will enable containers from Singapore, China, Vietnam, Cambodia, India, Bangladesh, Myanmar, Thailand and Korea to travel over land by train to Europe. The Southern Corridor of the Trans-Asian Railway is of prime interest to India. It connects Yunnan in China and Thailand with Europe via Turkey and passes through India.

The proposed route will enter India through Tamu and Moreh in Manipur bordering Myanmar, then enter Bangladesh through Mahisasan and Shabajpur and again enter India from Bangladesh at Gede, West Bengal. On the western side, the line will enter Pakistan at Attari. There is a 315 kilometres (196 mi) missing link on this route in the India-Myanmar sector; of this, 180 kilometres (110 mi), in India, is between Jiribam in Manipur and Tamu in Myanmar. The rail link between Jiribam and Imphal has been sanctioned by Indian Railways, but that is unlikely to be completed before 2016. At present construction work is in progress in a 97 kilometres (60 mi) stretch between Jiribam and Tupul.

== See also ==
- Transport between India and Pakistan
- India-Pakistan battles
