= Poonch-Rawalakot Bus =

Bus service between India and Pakistan

Poonch-Rawalakot Bus Service
- Founded: June 21, 2006
- Locale: Poonch, India and Rawalakot, Pakistan
- Service area: Jammu and Kashmir
- Service type: Cross-border bus service
- Routes: 1 (Poonch to Rawalakot)
- Daily ridership: Over 15,000 (as of April 2011)

The Poonch-Rawalakot Bus is a cross-border transport service that connects Poonch in Indian-administered Kashmir with Rawalakot in Azad Kashmir. The service was inaugurated on 21 June 2006, serving as an important confidence-building measure between India and Pakistan.

== History ==
The bus service was launched after the success of the Muzaffarabad to Srinagar bus service which started on 7 April 2005. Initially launched as a fortnightly service, in August 2008, buses began to operate weekly. The Poonch-Rawalakot bus service was started on 6 June 2006.

== Suspension and resumption ==
The bus service has experienced interruptions due to conflicts and tensions along the LoC. Despite these challenges, it has demonstrated its resilience by restarting operations following such events. Now it has been suspended from 2019.

== Impact ==
The bus service has acted as a bridge, reconnecting countless Kashmiris separated by the Line of Control (LoC). By April 2011, this service had enabled 15,000 Kashmiris to traverse this divide. This service has also played a pivotal role in enhancing diplomatic ties between India and Pakistan.

== See also ==
- Delhi–Lahore Bus
- Srinagar–Muzaffarabad Bus
