= Delhi–Lahore Bus =

Passenger bus service connecting India and Pakistan

Delhi Kashmiri Gate–Lahore Bus (Sada-e-Sarhad)
- Founded: 20 February 1999
- Commenced operation: March 16, 1999
- Ceased operation: August 9, 2019
- Defunct: August 12, 2019
- Stops: Amritsar, Kartarpur (Jalandhar), Kurukshetra, Sirhind-Fategarh, India-Pakistan border
- Destinations: Old Delhi (Delhi), Lahore, Pakistan
- Operator: Delhi Transport Corporation; Pakistan Tourism Development Corporation

The Delhi–Lahore Bus, officially known as Sada-e-Sarhad (Translation: Call of the Frontier, Hindi: सदा ए सरहद; Urdu: صدائے سرحد), was a passenger bus service connecting the Indian capital of New Delhi, Delhi with the city of Lahore, Pakistan via the border transit post at Wagah near Attari. The Routemaster bus number 10 was of symbolic importance to the efforts of the governments of both nations to foster peaceful and friendly relations. In its inaugural run on 19 February 1999, the bus carried the then-Indian Prime Minister Atal Bihari Vajpayee, who was to attend a summit in Lahore and was received by his Pakistani counterpart, Nawaz Sharif at Wagah. In August 2019 Pakistan decided to stop the service in the wake of India revoking Jammu and Kashmir's special status.

Officially launching its services on 16 March, the bus service was not halted even after the outbreak of the Kargil War. The bus service was halted in the aftermath of the 2001 Indian Parliament attack, which led to a serious confrontation between the two neighbours.

== Launching of the bus service ==
Since the partition of India in 1947, travel restrictions were imposed and most road and railway links shut off. Following the example of the Samjhauta Express that was launched in 1976, the bus service was launched to permit divided families to visit relatives and to foster commerce and tourism. The bus service launch was a key element in the efforts of the Indian and Pakistani governments to improve frosty and tense relations with Pakistan, especially in the aftermath of the 1998 Pokhran nuclear tests and the immediate Pakistani response of the Chaghai Hills tests. The bus had made its trial runs on 8 and 14 January, carrying officials of both governments. Vajpayee's bus journey and arrival in Pakistan was met with much fanfare on both sides of the border and worldwide media coverage. The inaugural bus also carried Indian celebrities and dignitaries such as Dev Anand, Satish Gujral, Javed Akhtar, Kuldip Nayar, Kapil Dev, Shatrughan Sinha and Mallika Sarabhai. Both governments soon promulgated the 1999 Lahore Declaration, which pledged both nations to the peaceful resolution of bilateral disputes, especially that of the Kashmir conflict and deployment of nuclear weapons, while fostering friendly commercial and cultural relations.

=== Suspension ===
While the bus service had continued to run during the Kargil War of 1999, it was suspended in the aftermath of the 2001 Indian Parliament attack on 13 December 2001, which the Indian government accused Pakistan of instigating. The bus service was resumed on 16 July 2003 when bilateral relations had improved. On August 12, 2019 the bus was shut down indefinitely by Pakistan.

== Travel significance ==
Despite suspension due to bilateral tensions, the Delhi-Lahore bus remained a symbol of desired friendship between the two nations. Since its inception, the bus has frequently carried trade delegations, diplomats and celebrities to both nations, attracting much media coverage. In consideration of the Indian national cricket team's tour of Pakistan in 2004, the Pakistani government permitted 10,000 Indians to travel to watch the cricket matches in Lahore; many of whom travelled via the bus amidst great fanfare at the border; the gesture was reciprocated the following year when the Pakistan national cricket team toured India.

== Bus service details ==
The Delhi-Lahore bus was jointly operated by the Delhi Transport Corporation and the Pakistan Tourism Development Corporation. The bus service is operated from Ambedkar Stadium Bus Terminal near Delhi Gate in Delhi and the Lahore-Delhi Bus Terminal at Gulberg-III near Liberty Market in Lahore. For journey to Lahore, there is a DTC Bus every Monday, Wednesday and Friday and a PTDC Bus every Tuesday, Thursday and Saturday. As regards the return trip to Delhi, the DTC Bus leaves Lahore every Tuesday, Thursday and Saturday whereas the PTDC Bus leaves Lahore every Monday, Wednesday and Friday. The DTC charges ₹2400 for adults ($40 approx.), and ₹ 833 ($13.2 approx.) for minors. Children under age of 2 traveled free. The PTDC charges ₹4000 ($65 approx.)for adult ticket since 1 November 2014 (the price before was ₹2000).

Authorities on both sides maintained strict security screening of the passengers and the luggage. Hazardous materials were prohibited and valuables checked. Customs and immigration checking were performed on arrival in the Pakistani town of Wagah and at the first stop in India at Amritsar. Passengers were required to carry their passports, a valid visa and their travel tickets and check in 2 hours before departure. The loss of tickets were to be reported to the police authorities.

The DTC operated Bus was a Volvo B9R. Earlier, DTC had an Ashok Leyland Viking Bus with an Azad built body. The bus stopped for meals and refreshment at Wagah and at the towns of Kartarpur, Kurukshetra, Sirhind and Amritsar in India. The duration of the entire journey was 8 hours, covering a distance of 530 km (329 mi). The bus was air-conditioned and carried on-board entertainment such as film shows, video and music players as well as a mobile telephone service.

== See also ==
- Poonch–Rawalakot Bus
- Srinagar–Muzaffarabad Bus
