= Srinagar–Muzaffarabad Bus =

Passenger bus service

- Founded: 2005
- Headquarters: Srinagar, Jammu and Kashmir, India and Muzaffarabad, Azad Jammu and Kashmir, Pakistan
- Service area: Srinagar, Jammu and Kashmir, India and Muzaffarabad, Azad Jammu and Kashmir, Pakistan
- Service type: Passenger bus service
- Routes: Srinagar to Muzaffarabad

The Srinagar–Muzaffarabad Bus (Hindi: श्रीनगर मुज़फ़्फ़राबाद बस, Urdu: سری نگر مُظفّر آباد بس) is a passenger bus service connecting Srinagar, the summer capital of the Indian-administered union territory of Jammu and Kashmir with Muzaffarabad, the capital of the Pakistani-administered territory of Azad Jammu and Kashmir across the Line of Control (LoC)—the boundary line denoting rival areas of control in the disputed region of Kashmir, but which is not an official international border. The bus is of symbolic importance to the efforts of the two nations' governments to foster peaceful and friendly relations and follows the success of the Delhi–Lahore Bus launched in 1999.

== Background ==
Since the First Kashmir War (1947–48), travel and communication between what became Pakistan administered Kashmir and Indian-administered Kashmir were indefinitely suspended. The region was a major theatre of war during the Indo-Pakistani Wars of 1965 and 1971. In the 1990s, the Line of Control was the scene of exchanges of fire between Pakistani and Indian forces and infiltration of militants into Indian Kashmir.

The idea of the Srinagar–Muzaffarabad Bus was inspired by the success of the Delhi–Lahore Bus, established in 1999, as well as other cross-border transport initiatives such as the Samjhauta Express and the Thar Express. However, the proposal was not considered until after the normalisation of bilateral relations following the 2001–2002 India–Pakistan standoff, during which the Delhi–Lahore Bus had also been suspended.

== Finalisation of bus link ==
The proposal was placed under official consideration by both countries in 2003 and was supported by the ongoing ceasefire and peace talks between militants and Indian forces as well as Kashmiri people who wanted to visit relatives separated since the 1947–48 war that divided the region. The Pakistani government under President Pervez Musharaff began extensive talks with the administration of Indian Prime Minister Atal Bihari Vajpayee, which were continued by the administration of Prime Minister Dr. Manmohan Singh, who succeeded Vajpayee in 2004. The official agreement was promulgated on February 16, 2005, when then-Indian Minister of External Affairs K. Natwar Singh visited the then-Pakistani President Pervez Musharaff in Rawalpindi, Pakistan. The decision was announced along with agreements on starting a new bus service connecting the Pakistani city of Lahore and the Indian city of Amritsar, establishing the Thar Express train service and opening respective consulates in the cities of Karachi, Pakistan, and Mumbai, India.

The Indian official position viewed the bus service as a "humanitarian measure without prejudice" and not affecting the rival policies and stands of the two governments on the Kashmir conflict. To make the bus safe and fully operational, the LoC would be demined if and where necessary and other security arrangements would be made as well. Both governments announced that the bus service could be used by Indian and Pakistani citizens wishing to travel anywhere in Indian Kashmir and Pakistani Kashmir, including the Northern Areas of Pakistan, which are part of India's claim on Kashmir and pre-1947 Kashmir.

== Bus service details ==
The bus runs a distance of 170 kilometres (110 mi). The bus service was officially launched on 7 April 2005 and was flagged-off by the Indian Prime Minister Dr. Manmohan Singh. In India, all citizens would have to apply at the Regional Passport Office in Srinagar, which was the designated authority to evaluate applications, verify identities and issue entry permits. The Indian government has proposed improving travel permit procedures, increasing the frequency of the bus service to weekly instead of a fortnightly, and starting bus services connecting Kargil, India, with Skardu, Pakistan, and Jammu, India, with Sialkot, Pakistan.

== See also ==
- Delhi–Lahore Bus
- Poonch–Rawalakot Bus
