= Samjhauta Express =

International train between India and Pakistan

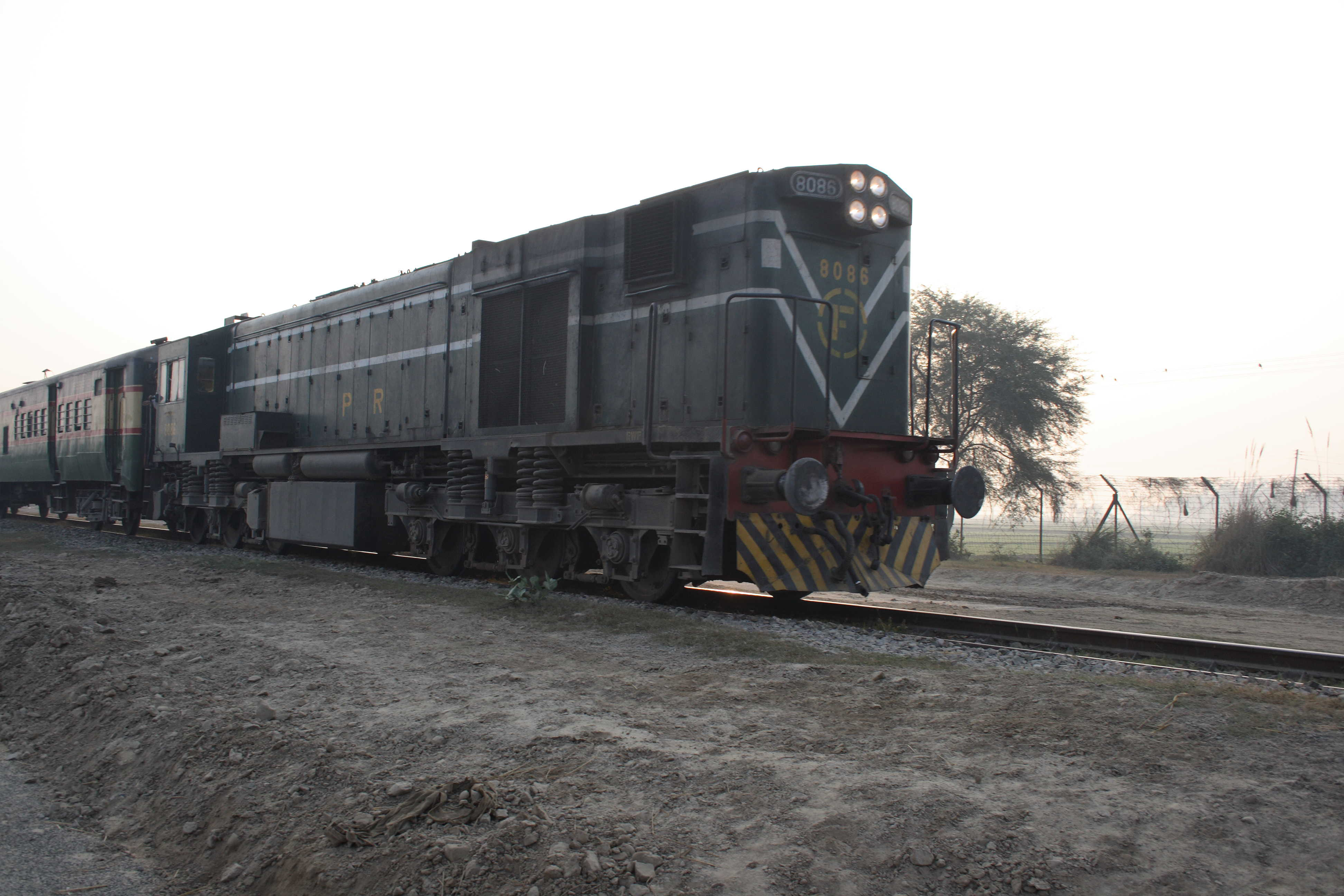
- Pakistan Railways rake of the Samjhauta Express

Overview
- Service type: Inter-city rail
- Locale: India; Pakistan
- First service: 22 July 1976; 50 years ago
- Last service: 8 August 2019; 7 years ago
- Current operators: Indian Railways's Northern Railway Zone; Pakistan Railways

Route
- Termini: Delhi Junction; Lahore Junction
- Stops: Attari Sham Singh; Wagah
- Distance travelled: 502 kilometres (312 mi)
- Average journey time: 11 hours, 42 minutes
- Service frequency: Bi-weekly

Technical
- Track gauge: 1,676 mm (5 ft 6 in)

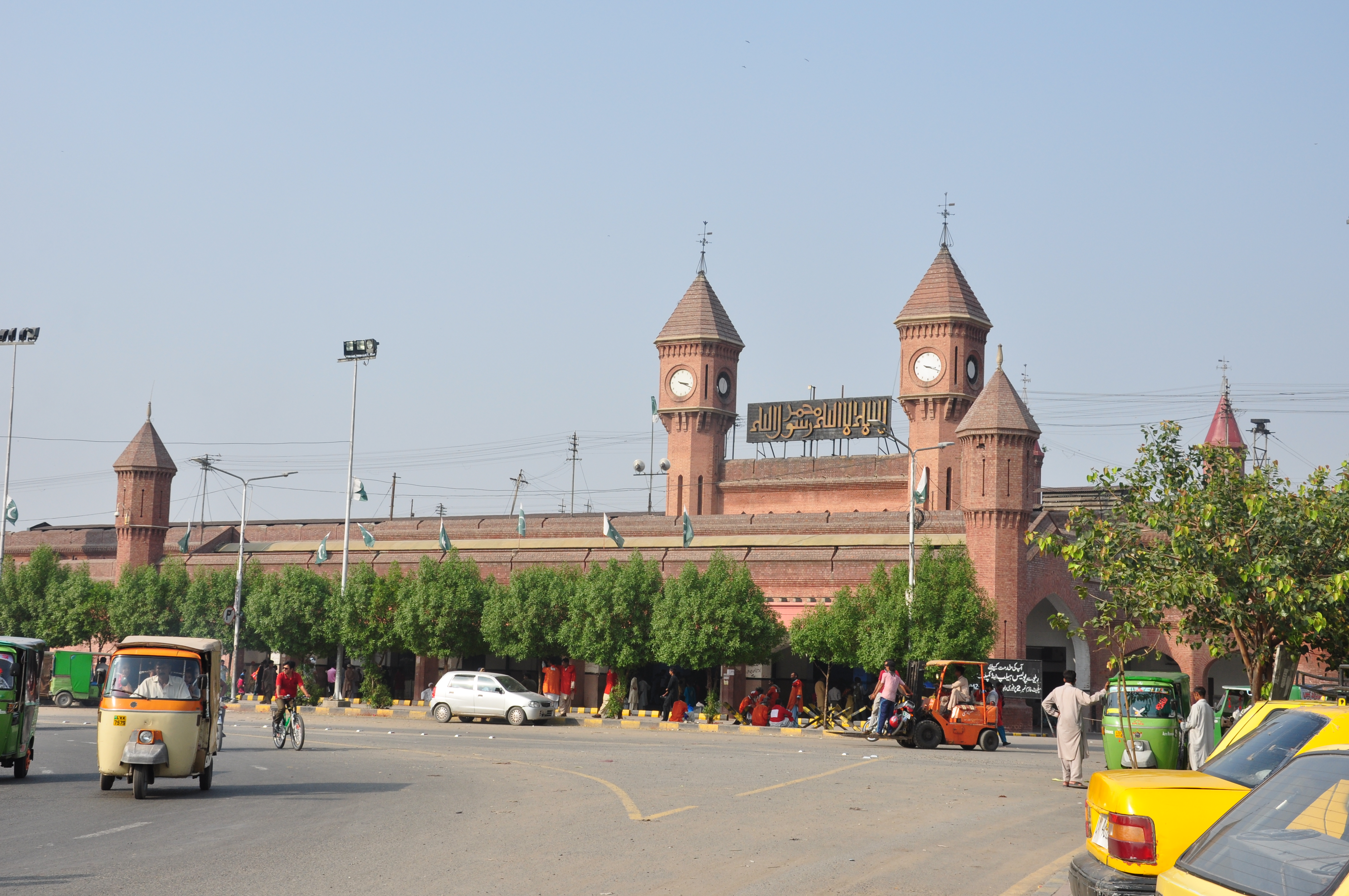
Lahore Junction railway station, the terminus in Pakistan.

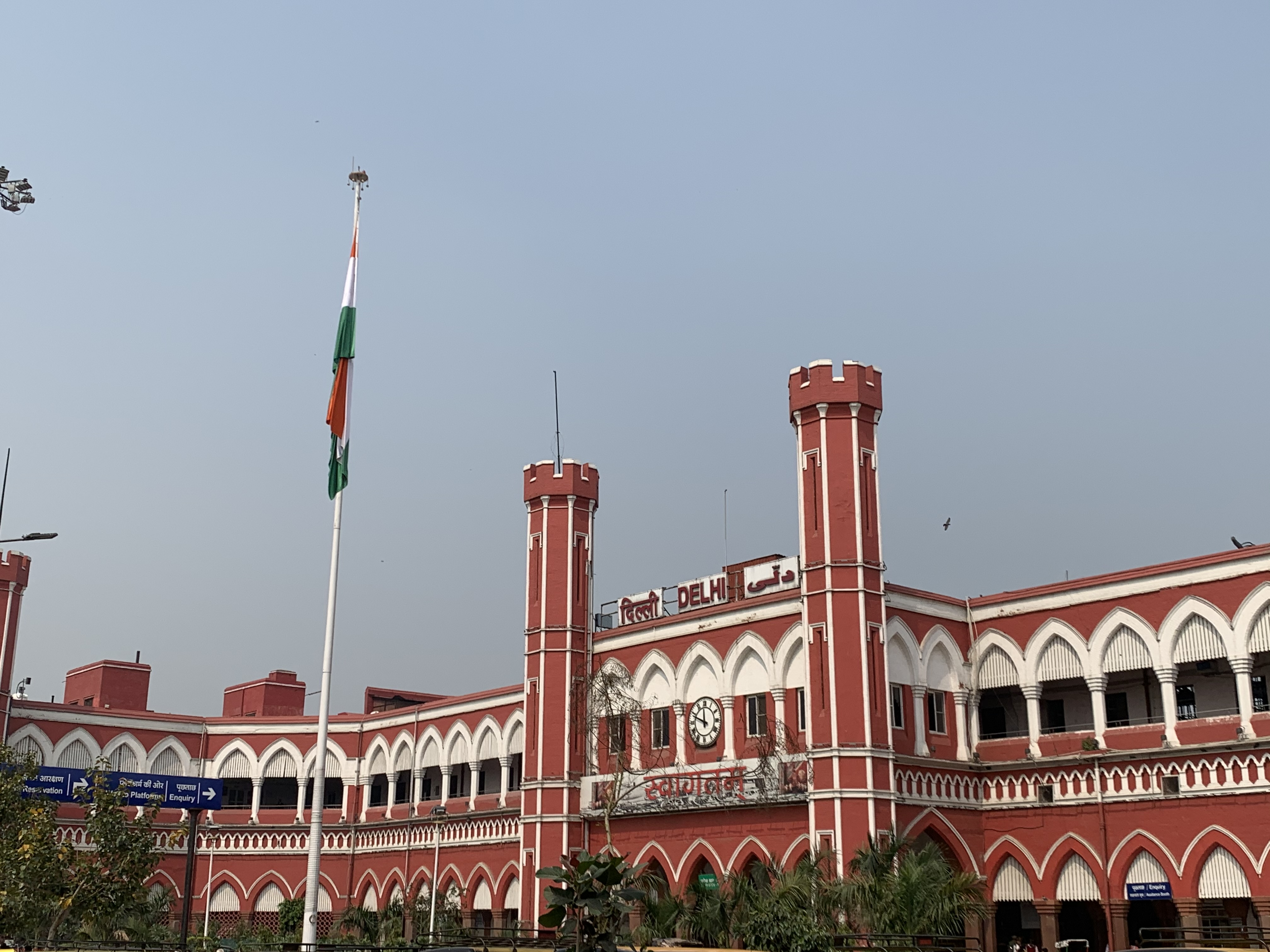
Delhi Junction railway station, the terminus in India.

The Samjhauta Express (transl. Agreement Express) was a twice-weekly train, Thursday and Monday, that ran between Delhi and Attari in India and Lahore in Pakistan. In Hindustani (Hindi-Urdu), the word "समझौता/سمجھوتا" (samjhauta) means an "agreement" or an "accord", especially one arising out of a compromise.

Until the reopening of the Thar Express, this was the only rail connection between the two countries. The train was started on 22 July 1976 following the Simla Agreement and ran between Amritsar and Lahore, a distance of about 50.2 km. Following disturbances in Punjab in the late 1980s, due to security reasons Indian Railways decided to terminate the service at Attari, where customs and immigration clearances take place. On 14 April 2000, in an agreement between Indian Railways and Pakistan Railways (PR), the distance was revised to cover just under three km.

== History ==
An earlier train ran between Amritsar and Lahore and vice versa and carried 8,239 persons from India to Pakistan and 10,360 from Pakistan to India from 28 October 1954 to 30 November 1954.

Samjhauta Express was a daily train when the service started in 1976 and changed to a twice-weekly schedule in 1994. Earlier the rakes were returned to the home country the same day but later in 2000 the rake remained overnight at that location.

The train's first break of service was when it was discontinued on 1 January 2002 in the wake of the terrorist attack on the Indian Parliament on 13 December 2001. Service resumed on 15 January 2004. Service was also suspended following the 27 December 2007, assassination of Benazir Bhutto as a preventive measure to deny militants a "high-value target" that was of great symbolic importance to both India and Pakistan.

On 8 October 2012, police recovered about 100 kg of contraband heroin and more than 500 rounds of bullet ammunition at Wagah border on the train heading for Delhi.

On 28 February 2019, the service was suspended following the 2019 India–Pakistan standoff. A spokesman for the Pakistan Foreign Office said that service was suspended "in view of the prevailing tensions between Pakistan and India" while it was reported that India has suspended the running of the train on its side, due to "drastic decline in occupancy" and "the suspension of services from across the border".

On 8 August 2019, the service was suspended by Pakistan following the revocation of Article 370 in Jammu and Kashmir.

== Route ==
Its termini were Lahore in Pakistan and Delhi in India. The border crossing took place between Wagah in Pakistan and Attari in India. Initially, this was a thorough service with the same rake going all the way between the termini; later the Pakistani rake stopped at Attari at which point passengers had to change trains.

Now there was a train from Delhi to Attari where all passengers alighted for customs and immigration. This train did not have any commercial stops between Delhi and Attari. It is incorrectly referred to as the Samjhauta Express and it is officially known as the Delhi–Attari or Attari–Delhi Express. The actual Samjhauta Express ran from Attari to Lahore, although the passengers were checked at Wagah, the first station on the Pakistani side. The train service was set up with an agreement between Indian Railways (IR) and Pakistan Railways (PR) to alternately use an Indian and a Pakistani rake and locomotive for the train, six months at a time.

The train usually had between four and eight coaches. The rake supplied by Pakistan was usually hauled by an Alco DL-543 class ALU20 diesel locomotive (Lahore shed), with the entire train in the standard dark green livery of PR.

== Incidents ==
=== 2007 bombing ===
In the early hours of 18 February 2007, 70 people (mostly Pakistani civilians and a few Indian military guarding the train) were killed and scores more injured in a terrorist attack on the Delhi–Attari Express. The attack occurred at Diwana station near the Indian city of Panipat, Haryana. Officials found evidence of improvised explosive devices (IEDs) made with RDX, containing fragmentation and flammable material, including three unexploded IEDs. The National Investigation Agency suspected that the blasts were masterminded by Swami Aseemanand, which was dismissed later for lack of evidence.

On 1 July 2009, the US Department of Treasury designated Arif Qasmani of the Lashkar-e Tayyiba as a person involved in terrorism, citing among other things his involvement in the Samjhauta Express bombing.

On 30 December 2010, India's National Investigation Agency claimed that they had solid evidence that Swami Aseemanand was the mastermind behind the blasts. He had taken help from his friend Sandeep Dange, an engineering graduate and has done higher study in physics, and Ramji Kalsangra, an electrician, to build the improvised explosive devices used in the blasts. On 8 January 2011, Aseemanand allegedly confessed the bombing of Samjhauta express, a statement later found to be obtained under duress. Later the Hindu nationalist group RSS (Rashtriya Swayamsevak Sangh) sent a legal notice to CBI (Central Bureau of Investigation) accusing it of deliberately leaking Swami Aseemanand's confession in the media. RSS spokesman Ram Madhav called the investigation maligning of organizations and individuals.
