= List of cities and towns in Sindh, Pakistan by population =

The following list sorts all cities in the Pakistani province of Sindh with a population of more than 100,000 according to the 2023 Census. As of March 15, 2023, 22 cities fulfill this criterion and are listed here. This list refers only to the population of individual cities, municipalities and towns within their defined limits, which does not include other municipalities or suburban areas within urban agglomerations.

== List ==
The following table lists the 22 cities in Sindh with a population of at least 100,000 on March 1, 2023, according to the 2023 Census of Pakistan. A city is displayed in bold if it is a state or federal capital.

City	2023 Census	2017 Census	1998 Census	Image
**Karachi**	18,868,021 ▲	14,884,402	9,339,023	Karachi
Hyderabad	1,921,275 ▲	1,733,622	1,166,894	Hyderabad
Sukkur	563,851 ▲	500,401	335,551	Sukkur
Larkana	551,716 ▲	488,006	270,283	
Nawabshah	363,138 ▲	279,688	189,244	
Mirpur Khas	267,833 ▲	233,916	189,671	The 17th century tombs of Mirpurkhas' nobility at the Chitorri graveyard
Jacobabad	219,315 ▲	191,076	138,780	
Shikarpur	204,938 ▲	196,158	134,883	
Khairpur	191,044 ▲	183,181	105,637	
Dadu	188,317 ▲	171,191	102,550	
Tando Adam Khan	174,291 ▲	152,617	104,907	
Tando Allahyar	171,185 ▲	156,562	85,812	
Bholari	169,613 ▲	158,239	...	
Umerkot	144,558 ▲	134,052	35,559	
Moro	142,685 ▲	95,398	61,033	
Shahdadkot	120,687 ▲	118,915	60,436	
Ghotki	119,879 ▲	111,321	52,823	
Badin	117,455 ▲	112,420	62,843	
Tando Muhammad Khan	114,406 ▲	101,863	65,396	
Shahdadpur	113,342 ▲	99,653	62,655	
Kamber Ali Khan	112,313 ▲	100,970	58,369	
Kotri	106,615 ▲	101,124	62,085	

== List of cities with population from 50,000 to 100,000 ==
Small cities in Sindh, Pakistan by population
No.	City	Census	
No.	City	2023 Census	2017 Census
23	Kandhkot	99,155 ▼	100,698
24	Rohri	92,135 ▲	69,920
25	Daharki	90,177 ▲	86,286
26	Thul	88,554 ▲	70,158
27	Jamshoro	88,190 ▲	32,768
28	Naushahro Feroze	87,416 ▲	38,204
29	Ratodero	81,935 ▲	67,498
30	Pano Aqil	76,942 ▲	75,805
31	Sehwan Sharif	75,167 ▲	66,923
32	Mirpur Mathelo	74,651 ▼	75,270
33	Matli	74,402 ▲	62,556
34	Tando Jam	74,303 ▲	71,760
35	Sanghar	74,112 ▼	75,410
36	Sakrand	72,040 ▲	65,699
37	Hala	71,094 ▲	65,731
38	Mehar	67,082 ▲	56,200
39	Kashmore	63,984 ▲	55,908
40	Gambat	59,790 ▲	53,354
41	Khipro	58,307 ▲	51,081
42	Mehrabpur	57,978 ▲	53,608
43	Pir Jo Goth	54,266 ▲	47,518
44	Makli	54,137 ▲	47,239
45	Naudero	52,846 ▲	48,983
46	Mithi	52,376 ▲	47,135
47	Thatta	51,723 ▼	54,697
48	Ubauro	50,981 ▲	44,496
49	Khairpur Nathan Shah	50,786 ▲	41,320

== List of towns with a population below 50,000 ==
No.	Town	Census	
No.	Town	2023 Census	2017 Census
1	Bhit Shah	45,345	39,662
2	Kandiaro	44,382	38,869
3	Badah	43,756	40,038
4	Ghouspur	43,476	35,319
5	Bhan	43,108	37,452
6	Shahpur Chakar	42,365	33,941
7	Jatia	41,993	39,777
8	Digri	41,774	36,745
9	Tando Ghulam Hyder	41,277	33,788
10	Tando Jan Muhammad	41,188	36,968
11	Choondiko	40,305	38,620
12	Gharo	40,220	36,799
13	Johi	40,086	29,031
14	Sujawal	38,736	35,308
15	Faqirabad	38,630	31,273
16	Warah	38,394	37,926
17	Pacca Chang	38,385	32,968
18	Nasirabad	38,105	37,819
19	Jhudo	37,379	32,215
20	Tando Ghulam Ali	36,961	35,724
21	Bandhi	36,588	32,189
22	Kot Diji	36,418	37,532
23	Daur	35,662	28,294
24	Naserpur	35,397	34,561
25	Shaheed Fazal Rahu	35,313	33,866
26	Sobho Dero	34,812	31,380
27	Ranipur	34,337	33,591
28	Lakhi	33,588	23,405
29	Sita Road	32,760	31,093
30	Setharja	32,741	29,856
31	Radhan	32,721	28,900
32	Khangarh	32,648	30,423
33	Hingorja	32,159	29,635
34	Mithiani	31,936	30,392
35	Qubo Saeed Khan	30,646	27,623
36	Bhiria Road	30,527	24,741
37	Naukot	30,296	27,173
38	Kot Ghulam Muhammad	30,088	29,042
39	Dhoronaro	29,507	27,996
40	Khoski	29,324	27,411
41	Salehpat	29,068	26,925
42	Kazi Ahmed	28,610	24,315
43	Tharu Shah	27,651	23,259
44	Piryaloi	27,294	25,792
45	Talhar	27,231	27,667
46	Dokri	27,125	22,164
47	Padidan	27,092	25,301
48	Husri	26,801	21,136
49	Behram	26,679	21,042
50	Kunri	26,609	27,993
51	Arija	26,047	20,608
52	Halani	25,317	23,380
53	Chachro	25,309	23,315
54	Thari Mirwah	25,264	23,669
55	Ahmed Pur	24,812	21,871
56	Tando Mir Ali	24,605	23,634
57	Khuhra	24,341	24,246
58	New Saeedabad	24,084	21,037
59	Guddu	23,499	24,537
60	Mirwah	23,048	21,000
61	Matiari	22,517	21,220
62	Therhi-i	22,234	22,965
63	Kario Ghanwar	21,775	19,487
64	Rajo Khanani	21,513	21,018
65	Kandhra	21,465	15,798
66	Pyaro Lund	21,427	17,999
67	Chhore Old	21,178	19,930
68	Berani	20,946	18,788
69	Hingorno	20,569	16,805
70	Madeji	20,530	19,817
71	Miro Khan	20,428	21,270
72	Agra	20,222	17,021
73	Karampur	20,050	14,085
74	Chambar	20,037	17,802
75	Garhi Khairo	20,007	12,619
76	Sultanabad	19,972	16,528
77	Gharo	19,961	14,179
78	Sohrab Khan Sarki	19,867	12,525
79	Jhol	19,364	21,792
80	Kumb	19,352	16,851
81	Jam Sahib	19,127	16,855
82	Islamkot	19,064	18,512
83	Bozdar Wada	18,959	16,706
84	Bucheri	18,798	16,003
85	Chuhar Jamali	18,354	17,727
86	Sarhari	18,351	17,698
87	Khanpur	18,052	24,919
88	Pangrio	17,982	13,443
89	Darya Khan Marri	17,890	11,942
90	Gaji Khuhawar	17,879	15,455
91	Khadro	17,833	15,448
92	Sanjar Chang	17,669	18,383
93	Thana Bulla Khan	17,462	14,944
94	Babarloi	17,432	13,689
95	Wagan	16,734	15,763
96	Therhi	16,531	12,071
97	Garhi Yasin	16,155	16,120
98	Ghorabari	15,184	9,023
99	Kadhan	14,956	10,845
100	Chak	14,908	14,688
101	Garello	14,726	11,597
102	Thari Mohabat	14,582	14,282
103	Daulatpur	14,508	18,297
104	Bhiria	14,370	14,089
105	Mirpur Buriro	14,174	10,731
106	Nabi Sar Road	14,074	11,201
107	Hala Old	13,992	13,030
108	Diplo	13,257	13,142
109	Sann	13,156	12,730
110	Khyber	12,937	10,331
111	Odero Lal Station	12,704	11,609
112	Phulji	12,700	11,261
113	Chelhar	12,489	11,145
114	Mirpur Sakro	12,454	10,329
115	Nagar Parkar	12,239	11,801
116	Tangwani	12,015	12,425
117	Kandiari	11,419	9,714
118	Adilpur	11,046	12,948
119	Daro	10,847	10,873
120	Rustam	10,567	9,334
121	Mirpur Bathoro	10,462	9,427
122	Jati	10,448	12,161
123	Karoondi	10,330	10,381
124	Nindo	10,151	8,381

== See also ==
- List of cities in Pakistan by population
  - List of cities in Azad Kashmir by population
  - List of cities in Punjab, Pakistan by population
  - List of cities in Khyber Pakhtunkhwa by population
  - List of cities in Balochistan by population
- List of metropolitan areas in Pakistan
