= Shaheed Benazirabad Division =

Coordinates: 27°15′N 69°00′E

Shaheed Benazirabad Division Nawabshah Division
- Division
- Map of Shaheed Benazirabad Division
- Country: Pakistan
- Province: Sindh
- Established: 6 June 2014
- Founder: Sindh Government
- Capital: Nawabshah

Government
  - Commissioner: Nadeem Ahmed Abro
- Postal code: 67000

Shaheed Benazirabad Division also called Nawabshah Division is an administrative division of the Sindh Province of Pakistan. It was created on 6 June 2014, formerly a part of Hyderabad Division. Nawabshah is the divisional headquarters of Shaheed Benazirabad Division. According to 2023 Pakistani census division had a population of 5,928,917 (5.9 million).

== History ==
Shaheed Benazirabad Division was created from Hyderabad Division on the 6th of June, 2014.

== Demographics ==
Historical population
| Year | Pop. | ±% p.a. |
|---|---|---|
| 1951 | ... | — |
| 1961 | ... | — |
| 1972 | ... | — |
| 1981 | 2,560,448 | — |
| 1998 | 3,510,036 | +1.87% |
| 2017 | 5,282,277 | +2.17% |
| 2023 | 5,930,649 | +1.95% |

=== Population ===
In the 2023 Pakistani census, Shaheed Benazirabad Division had a population of 5,930,649 roughly equal to the country of Finland or the US state of Colorado. It consists of 3,010,350 males & females 2,918,315.

Languages of Shaheed Benazirabad Division (2023 Pakistani census)
1. Sindhi (83.7%)
2. Urdu (6.49%)
3. Punjabi (3.86%)
4. Balochi (1.37%)
5. Others (4.50%)

Language

According to 2023 Pakistani census There were 4,965,355 Sindhi, 384,911 Urdu, 229,067 Punjabi, 81,258 Balochi and Other various communities such as brahui,Saraiki,Pashto etc.

== List of the Districts ==
| # | District | Headquarter | Area (km^{2}) | Pop. (2023) | Density (ppl/km^{2}) (2023) | Lit. rate (2023) |
|---|---|---|---|---|---|---|
| 1 | Sanghar | Sanghar | 10,728 | 2,308,465 | 215.0 | 43.66% |
| 2 | Shaheed Benazirabad | Nawabshah | 4,502 | 1,845,102 | 409.5 | 50.86% |
| 3 | Naushahro Feroze | Naushahro Feroze | 2,945 | 1,777,082 | 603.2 | 57.15% |

== List of the Tehsils ==
| Tehsil | Area (km^{2}) | Population (2023) | Density (ppl/km^{2}) (2023) | Literacy rate (2023) | Districts |
|---|---|---|---|---|---|
| Bhiria Tehsil | 488 | 330,308 | 676.86 | 58.14% | Naushahro Feroze District |
| Kandiaro Tehsil | 771 | 356,506 | 462.39 | 64.04% | Naushahro Feroze District |
| Mehrabpur Tehsil | 361 | 273,764 | 758.35 | 60.92% | Naushahro Feroze District |
| Moro Tehsil | 609 | 408,148 | 670.19 | 53.87% | Naushahro Feroze District |
| Naushahro Feroze Tehsil | 717 | 408,356 | 569.53 | 51.24% | Naushahro Feroze District |
| Kazi Ahmed Tehsil | 972 | 402,834 | 414.44 | 47.11% | Shaheed Benazirabad District |
| Daur Tehsil (2004) | 2,210 | 532,621 | 241.00 | 41.36% | Shaheed Benazirabad District |
| Nawabshah Tehsil (1907) | 435 | 481,978 | 1,108.00 | 62.44% | Shaheed Benazirabad District |
| Sakrand Tehsil (1858) | 885 | 427,669 | 483.24 | 52.84% | Shaheed Benazirabad District |
| Jam Nawaz Ali Tehsil | 440 | 171,598 | 390.00 | 31.67% | Sanghar District |
| Khipro Tehsil | 5,933 | 366,748 | 61.81 | 37.04% | Sanghar District |
| Sanghar Tehsil | 2,118 | 482,560 | 227.84 | 40.00% | Sanghar District |
| Shahdadpur Tehsil | 890 | 525,164 | 590.07 | 50.69% | Sanghar District |
| Sinjhoro Tehsil | 907 | 354,709 | 391.08 | 42.02% | Sanghar District |
| Tando Adam Khan Tehsil | 440 | 407,686 | 926.56 | 50.81% | Sanghar District |

== Constituencies ==
| Provincial Assembly Constituency | National Assembly Constituency | District |
|---|---|---|
| PS-32 Naushahro Feroze-I | NA-205 Naushahro Feroze-I | Naushahro Feroze |
| PS-33 Naushahro Feroze-II | NA-205 Naushahro Feroze-I | Naushahro Feroze |
| PS-34 Naushahro Feroze-III | NA-206 Naushahro Feroze-II | Naushahro Feroze |
| PS-35 Naushahro Feroze-IV | NA-206 Naushahro Feroze-II | Naushahro Feroze |
| PS-36 Nawabshah-I | NA-207 Nawabshah-I | Nawabshah |
| PS-37 Nawabshah-II | NA-207 Nawabshah-I | Nawabshah |
| PS-38 Nawabshah-III | NA-208 Nawabshah-II | Nawabshah |
| PS-39 Nawabshah-IV | NA-208 Nawabshah-II | Nawabshah |
| PS-40 Sanghar-I | NA-209 Sanghar-I | Sanghar |
| PS-41 Sanghar-II | NA-209 Sanghar-I | Sanghar |
| PS-42 Sanghar-III | NA-209 Sanghar-I | Sanghar |
| PS-43 Sanghar-IV | NA-210 Sanghar-II | Sanghar |
| PS-44 Sanghar-V | NA-210 Sanghar-II | Sanghar |

== See also ==
- Nawabshah
- Hyderabad Division
- Nasrat
