= NA-209 Sanghar-I =

Constituency of the National Assembly of Pakistan

- Constituency for the National Assembly of Pakistan
- Region: Sanghar Tehsil, Khipro, Jam Nawaz Ali Tehsils and Sinjhoro Tehsil (partly) of Sanghar District
- Electorate: 607,638

Current constituency
- Party: Pakistan People's Party
- Member(s): Shazia Marri
- Created from: NA-235 Sanghar-II and NA-211 Sanghar-III

NA-209 Sanghar-I (حلقہ این اے 209، سانگھڑ-1) is a constituency for the National Assembly of Pakistan.

== Assembly Segments ==
| Constituency number | Constituency | District | Current MPA | Party |
|---|---|---|---|---|
| 40 | PS-40 Sanghar-I | Sanghar District | Ghulam Dastageer Rajar | GDA |
| 41 | PS-41 Sanghar-II | Sanghar District | Ali Hassan Hingorjo | PPP |
| 42 | PS-42 Sanghar-III | Sanghar District | Jam Shabbir Ali Khan | PPP |

== Election 2002 ==
General elections were held on 10 October 2002. Qazi Abdul Qudus Rajar of PML-F won by 61,671 votes.

General election 2002: NA-235 Sanghar-II
| Party | Candidate | Votes | % | ±% |
|---|---|---|---|---|
| PML(F) | Qazi Abdul Qudus Rajar | 61,671 | 59.60 | |
| Independent | Muhammad Asad Ali Khan Junejo | 34,888 | 33.72 | |
| PPP | Jian Khan Sarfraz Rajar | 5,212 | 5.04 | |
| Others | Others (two candidates) | 1,701 | 1.64 | |
| Turnout | | 105,813 | 45.96 | |
| Total valid votes | | 103,472 | 97.79 | |
| Rejected ballots | | 2,341 | 2.21 | |
| Majority | | 26,783 | 25.88 | |
| Registered electors | | 230,238 | | |

== Election 2008 ==
General elections were held on 18 February 2008. Ghulam Dastagir Rajar of PML-F won by 68,122 votes.

General election 2008: NA-235 Sanghar-II
| Party | Candidate | Votes | % | ±% |
|---|---|---|---|---|
| PML(F) | Ghulam Dastgir Rajar | 68,122 | 67.00 | |
| PPP | Sarfaraz Rajar | 31,997 | 31.47 | |
| Others | Others (seven candidates) | 1,562 | 1.53 | |
| Turnout | | 104,997 | 52.57 | |
| Total valid votes | | 101,681 | 96.84 | |
| Rejected ballots | | 3,316 | 3.16 | |
| Majority | | 36,125 | 35.53 | |
| Registered electors | | 199,722 | | |
| PML(F) hold | | | | |

== Election 2013 ==
General elections were held on 11 May 2013. Pir Sadaruddin Shah of PML-F won but decided to vacate the seat in favour of another constituency.

General election 2013: NA-235 Sanghar-II
| Party | Candidate | Votes | % | ±% |
|---|---|---|---|---|
| PML(F) | Pir Syed Saddaruddin Shah Rashdi | 74,062 | 53.47 | |
| PPP | Shazia Marri | 62,231 | 44.93 | |
| Others | Others (six candidates) | 2,207 | 1.60 | |
| Turnout | | 142,412 | 62.89 | |
| Total valid votes | | 138,500 | 97.25 | |
| Rejected ballots | | 3,912 | 2.75 | |
| Majority | | 11,831 | 8.54 | |
| Registered electors | | 226,448 | | |
| PML(F) hold | | | | |

== By-election 2013 ==
A by-election was held on 22 August 2013. Shazia Marri of PPP won and became a member of the National Assembly.

By-election 2013: NA-235 Sanghar-II
| Party | Candidate | Votes | % | ±% |
|---|---|---|---|---|
| PPP | Shazia Marri | 66,166 | 54.07 | |
| PML(F) | Khuda Bux Dars | 55,719 | 45.53 | |
| Others | Others (eleven candidates) | 491 | 0.40 | |
| Turnout | | 126,425 | 55.76 | |
| Total valid votes | | 122,376 | 96.80 | |
| Rejected ballots | | 4,049 | 3.20 | |
| Majority | | 10,447 | 8.54 | |
| Registered electors | | 226,726 | | |
| PPP gain from PML(F) | | | | |

== Election 2018 ==
General elections were held on 25 July 2018.

General election 2018: NA-216 Sanghar-II
| Party | Candidate | Votes | % | ±% |
|---|---|---|---|---|
| PPP | Shazia Marri | 80,770 | 50.80 | |
| GDA | Kishan Chand Parwani | 70,791 | 44.52 | |
| Independent | Nafees Ali Khan | 2,751 | 1.73 | |
| MMA | Saeed Ahmed | 920 | 0.58 | |
| Independent | Khuda Bux | 868 | 0.55 | |
| Independent | Quratulain Marri | 866 | 0.54 | |
| PTI | Muhammad Aslam | 785 | 0.49 | |
| Independent | Yasir Ali | 521 | 0.33 | |
| Independent | All Muhammad Marri | 268 | 0.17 | |
| Independent | Aurangzeb | 257 | 0.16 | |
| Independent | Muhammad Hashim | 102 | 0.06 | |
| Independent | Jam Muhammad Farooq Ali Khan | 95 | 0.06 | |
| Turnout | | 168,563 | 57.74 | |
| Total valid votes | | 158,994 | 94.32 | |
| Rejected ballots | | 9,569 | 5.68 | |
| Majority | | 9,979 | 6.28 | |
| Registered electors | | 291,935 | | |
| PPP hold | | | | |

== Election 2024 ==
Elections were held on 8 February 2024. Shazia Marri won the election with 156,723 votes.

General election 2024: NA-209 Sanghar-I
| Party | Candidate | Votes | % | ±% |
|---|---|---|---|---|
| PPP | Shazia Marri | 156,723 | 51.22 | ▲0.42 |
| GDA | Muhammad Khan Junejo | 140,370 | 45.88 | ▲1.36 |
| Others | Others (fourteen candidates) | 8,885 | 2.90 | |
| Turnout | | 317,972 | 52.33 | ▼5.41 |
| Total valid votes | | 305,978 | 96.23 | |
| Rejected ballots | | 11,994 | 3.77 | |
| Majority | | 16,353 | 5.34 | ▼0.94 |
| Registered electors | | 607,638 | | |
| PPP hold | | | | |

== See also ==
- NA-208 Nawabshah-II
- NA-210 Sanghar-II
