= Pir Baksh Junejo =

Pakistani politician

- پير بخش جوڻيجو

Member of the National Assembly of Pakistan
- In office 1 June 2013 – 31 May 2018
- Constituency: NA-234 (Sanghar-I)

Personal details
- Born: 14 February 1956 (age 70)
- Party: Grand Democratic Alliance (2024-present)

Pir Baksh Junejo (Sindhi: پير بخش جوڻيجو;Urdu: پیر بخش جونیجو; born 14 February 1956) is a Pakistani politician who had been a member of the National Assembly of Pakistan from June 2013 to May 2018.

== Early life ==
He was born on 14 February 1956.

== Political career ==
He ran for the seat of the National Assembly of Pakistan as an independent candidate from Constituency NA-234 (Sanghar-I), Constituency NA-235 (Sanghar-cum-Mirpurkhas-cum-Umerkot) and Constituency NA-236 (Sanghar-II) in 2008 Pakistani general election but was unsuccessful. He received 15 votes from Constituency NA-234 (Sanghar-I) and lost the seat to Muhammad Jadam Mangrio, He received 16 votes from Constituency NA-235 (Sanghar-cum-Mirpurkhas-cum-Umerkot) and lost the seat to Ghulam Dastgir Rajar, a candidate of Pakistan Muslim League (F) (PML-F). He received 5 votes from Constituency NA-236 (Sanghar-II) and lost the seat to Roshan Din Junejo. In the same election, he ran for the seat of the Provincial Assembly of Sindh from Constituency PS-81 (Sanghar-IV) as an independent candidate but was unsuccessful. He received 20 votes and lost the seat to Jam Madad Ali Khan.

He was elected to the National Assembly as a candidate of PML-F from Constituency NA-234 (Sanghar-I) in the 2013 Pakistani general election. He received 90,787 votes and defeated Fida Hussain Dero, a candidate of Pakistan Peoples Party (PPP).
