= PS-40 Sanghar-I =

Constituency of the Provincial Assembly of Sindh, Pakistan

- Constituency for the Provincial Assembly of Sindh
- Region: Sanghar Tehsil (partly) including Sanghar city and Sinjhoro Tehsil (partly) of Sanghar District
- Electorate: 236,507

Current constituency
- Member: Vacant
- Created from: PS-78 Sanghar-I (2002-2018); PS-46 Sanghar-VI and PS-45 Sanghar-V (2018-2023)

PS-40 Sanghar-I (پی ایس-40، سانگھڑ-1) is a constituency of the Provincial Assembly of Sindh.

== General elections 2024 ==
Provincial election 2024: PS-40 Sanghar-I
Party	Candidate	Votes	%	±%
GDA	Ghulam Dastageer Rajar	56,400	48.29	
PPP	Naveed Dero	52,988	45.37	
PTI	Mushtaque (Note: Filed nomination papers as PTI candidate but ECP allowed him to run as an Independent)	3,956	3.39	
Others	Others (twelve candidates)	3,451	2.95	
Turnout		121,010	51.17	
Total valid votes		116,795	96.52	
Rejected ballots		4,215	3.48	
Majority		3,412	2.92	
Registered electors		236,507		
GDA hold				

== General elections 2018 ==
Provincial election 2018: PS-46 Sanghar-VI
Party	Candidate	Votes	%	±%
GDA	Waryam Faqir	42,472	48.43	
PPP	Rana Abdul Sattar	41,549	47.38	
Independent	Mir Jawad Afsar Talpur	948	1.08	
Independent	Faqir Zaffarullah	930	1.06	
Independent	Prem Das	596	0.68	
Independent	Ali Jan	369	0.42	
Independent	Ahmed Hassan Abbasi	268	0.31	
MQM-P	Khalid Hussain	234	0.27	
Independent	Rana Rashid Ali Khan	201	0.23	
Independent	Maqbool Ahmed	93	0.11	
Independent	Amir Bux	42	0.05	
Majority		923	1.05	
Valid ballots		87,702		
Rejected ballots		3,972		
Turnout		91,674		
Registered electors		156,439		
hold				

== General elections 2013 ==
Contesting candidates	Party affiliation	Votes polled

== General elections 2008 ==
Contesting candidates	Party affiliation	Votes polled

== See also ==
- PS-39 Nawabshah-IV
- PS-41 Sanghar-II
