= PS-45 Sanghar-V =

Constituency of the Provincial Assembly of Sindh, Pakistan

- Former constituency for the Provincial Assembly of Sindh
- Region: Shahdadpur Tehsil (partly) and Sinjhoro Tehsil (partly) including Sinjhoro Town of Sanghar District

Former constituency
- Abolished: 2023
- Party: PPP
- Member: Shahid Abdul Salam Thahim
- Created from: PS-79 Sanghar-II (2002-2018)
- Replaced by: PS-40 Sanghar-I, PS-42 Sanghar-III and PS-44 Sanghar-V

PS-45 Sanghar-V (پی ایس-45، سانگھڑ-5) is a constituency of the Provincial Assembly of Sindh. It was abolished after 2023 Delimitations as Sanghar lost 1 seat.

== General elections 2013 ==
Contesting candidates	Party affiliation	Votes polled

== General elections 2008 ==
Contesting candidates	Party affiliation	Votes polled

== See also ==
- PS-44 Sanghar-IV
- PS-46 Sanghar-VI
