= Faraz Dero =

Pakistani politician

- فراز ڏيرو

Provincial Minister of Sindh for Auqaf
- In office 5 September 2018 – 11 August 2023

Provincial Minister of Sindh for Religious Affairs
- In office 5 September 2018 – 11 August 2023

Provincial Minister of Sindh for Zakat and Ushr
- In office 5 September 2018 – 11 August 2023

Member of the Provincial Assembly of Sindh
- In office 13 August 2018 – 11 August 2023
- Constituency: PS-44 Sanghar-IV
- In office 29 May 2013 – 28 May 2018
- Constituency: PS-82 (Sanghar-V)

Personal details
- Born: 2 April 1980 (age 46) Tando Adam Khan
- Party: Pakistan Peoples Party

Faraz Dero (Sindhi: فراز ڏيرو) is a Pakistani politician who was the Provincial Minister of Sindh for Auqaf, Religious Affairs, and Zakat and Ushr from September 2018 to August 2023. He was a member of the Provincial Assembly of Sindh from August 2018 to August 2023 and a member of the Provincial Assembly of Sindh from May 2013 to May 2018.

== Early life and education ==
He was born on 2 April 1980 in Tando Adam Khan.

He attended Lawrence College, Ghora Gali.

== Political career ==
He was elected to the Provincial Assembly of Sindh as a candidate of Pakistan Peoples Party (PPP) from Constituency PS-82 (Sanghar-V) in the 2013 Pakistani general election.

He was re-elected to Provincial Assembly of Sindh as a candidate of PPP from Constituency PS-44 (Sanghar-IV) in the 2018 Pakistani general election.

On 5 September 2018, he was inducted into the provincial Sindh cabinet of Chief Minister Syed Murad Ali Shah and was appointed as Provincial Minister of Sindh for Auqaf with the additional ministerial portfolios of religious affairs, and Zakat and Ushr.
