= Tilla Shah Graveyard =

Pakistani cemetery

Tilla Shah Graveyard Sindhi( تلا شاهه قبرستان) Urdu (تلا شاہ قبرستان) is historical burial place of Kalhora dynasty and Talpur dynasty which is located nearby village Naonabad, Taluka Jam Nawaz Ali, Sanghar District, Sindh Pakistan.

== Location ==
The cemetery of Tilla Shah is situated in close proximity of village Naonabad towards east-south and 8 kilometers from town of Jam Nawaz Ali towards south-east. A link road leads to necropolis from Jam Nawaz Ali.

== Murals ==
The construction of tombs is example of Kalhora period architecture. In graveyard, all the walls of the tombs are painted with murals. The Islamic and Mughal art of painting are applied herein murals on walls of tombs. The calligraphy, love tales, fruits, birds, fishes, flowers, different geometrical designs, vegetal and floral designs are represented on the walls
