= Sarhari railway station =

Railway station in Pakistan

Sarhari Railway Station سرہاڑی ریلوے اسٹیشن سرهاڙي ريلوي اسٽيشن

General information
- Coordinates: 26.0971°N 68.4798°E
- Owner: Ministry of Railways
- Line: Karachi–Peshawar Railway Line

Other information
- Station code: SRH

Services
Preceding station	Pakistan Railways	Following station
Lundo towards Kiamari	Karachi–Peshawar Line	Nawabshah towards Peshawar Cantonment
Location

Sarhari Railway Station (Urdu: سرہاڑی ریلوے اسٹیشن, Sindhi: سرھاڙي ريلوي اسٽيشن) is located in Sarhari town, Sanghar district, Sindh, Pakistan.

== See also ==
- List of railway stations in Pakistan
- Pakistan Railways
