= PS-42 Sanghar-III =

Constituency of the Provincial Assembly of Sindh, Pakistan

- Constituency for the Provincial Assembly of Sindh
- Region: Jam Nawaz Ali Taluka, Sanghar Tehsil (partly) and Sinjhoro Tehsil (partly) of Sanghar District
- Electorate: 225,565

Current constituency
- Member: Vacant
- Created from: PS-81 Sanghar-IV (2002-2018); PS-42 Sanghar-II and PS-45 Sanghar-V (2018-2023)

PS-42 Sanghar-III (پی ایس-42، سانگھڑ-3) is a constituency of the Provincial Assembly of Sindh.

== General elections 2024 ==
Provincial election 2024: PS-42 Sanghar-III
Party	Candidate	Votes	%	±%
PPP	Jam Shabbir Ali Khan	58,748	53.15	
GDA	Jam Nafees Ali Khan	48,078	43.50	
Others	Others (twenty two candidates)	3,700	3.35	
Turnout		116,615	51.70	
Total valid votes		110,526	94.78	
Rejected ballots		6,089	5.22	
Majority		10,670	9.65	
Registered electors		225,565		
PPP gain from GDA				

== General elections 2018 ==
Provincial election 2018: PS-42 Sanghar-II
Party	Candidate	Votes	%	±%
GDA	Qazi Shams Din	44,636	52.69	
PPP	Ali Hassan	35,059	41.39	
Independent	Pir Naveed Ali Shah	3,704	4.37	
Independent	Manthar	363	0.43	
Independent	Yasir Ali	244	0.29	
PTI	Muhammad Nawaz	209	0.25	
Independent	Khuda Bux	208	0.25	
Independent	Muhammad Khan	183	0.22	
Independent	Muhammad Ali	104	0.12	
Majority		9,577	11.30	
Valid ballots		84,710		
Rejected ballots		5,337		
Turnout		90.047		
Registered electors		150,429		
hold				

== General elections 2013 ==
Contesting candidates	Party affiliation	Votes polled

== General elections 2008 ==
Contesting candidates	Party affiliation	Votes polled

== See also ==
- PS-41 Sanghar-II
- PS-43 Sanghar-IV
