= NA-211 Sanghar-III =

Constituency of the National Assembly of Pakistan

- Former constituency for the National Assembly of Pakistan
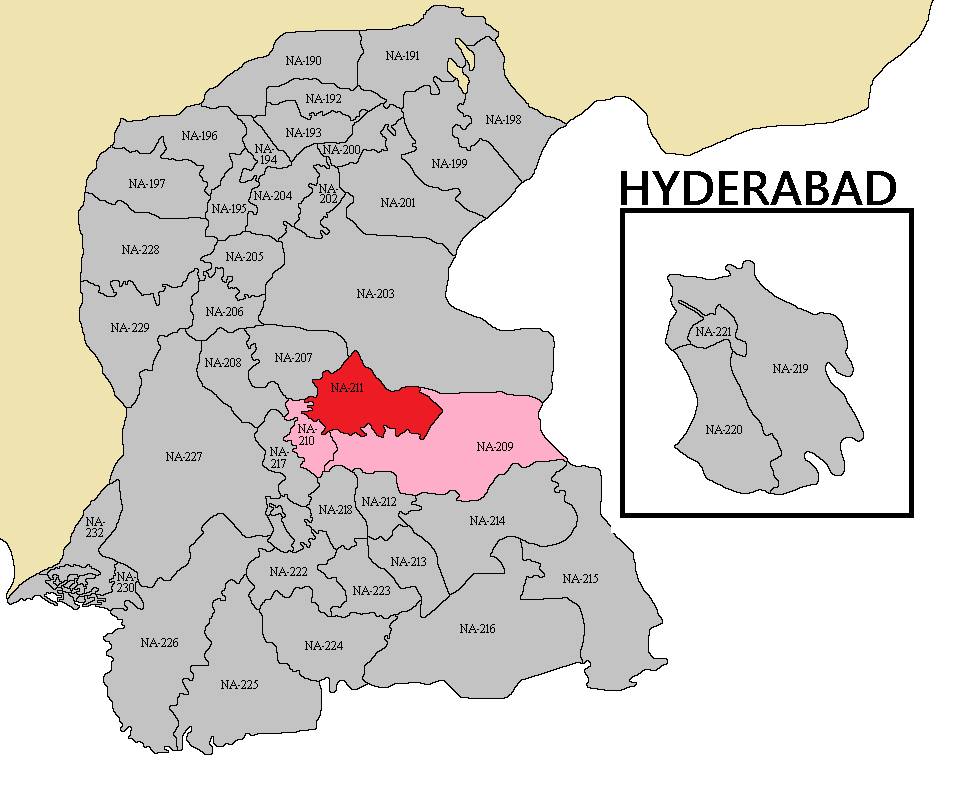
- Region: Sinjhoro Tehsil, Shahdadpur Tehsil (partly) and Sanghar Tehsil (partly) including Sanghar City of Sanghar District

Former constituency
- Abolished: 2023
- Member(s): Vacant
- Created from: NA-234 Sanghar-I

NA-211 Sanghar-III (این اے-211، سانگھڑ-3) was a constituency for the National Assembly of Pakistan.

== Election 2002 ==
General elections were held on 10 October 2002. Haji Khuda Bux Nizamani of PML-F won by 61,741 votes.

General election 2002: NA-234 Sanghar-I
Party	Candidate	Votes	%	±%
PML(F)	Khuda Bux Nizamani	61,741	60.35	
PML(N)	Mian Aijaz Anmed Shafi	24,474	23.92	
PPP	Abid Hussain Rind	9,165	8.96	
MQM	Abdul Malik Shar	4,441	4.34	
Others	Others (six candidates)	2,477	2.43	
Turnout		106,359	43.87	
Total valid votes		102,298	96.18	
Rejected ballots		4,061	3.82	
Majority		37,267	36.43	
Registered electors		242,471		

== Election 2008 ==
General elections were held on 18 February 2008. Muhammad Jadam Mangrio of PML-F won by 71,394 votes.

General election 2008: NA-234 Sanghar-I
Party	Candidate	Votes	%	±%
PML(F)	Muhammad Jadam Mangrio	71,394	61.12	
PPP	Ghulam Muhammad Junejo Alias Gul Junejo	44,858	38.40	
Others	Others (seven candidates)	559	0.48	
Turnout		120,141	51.96	
Total valid votes		116,811	97.23	
Rejected ballots		3,330	2.77	
Majority		26,536	22.72	
Registered electors		231,236		

== Election 2013 ==
General elections were held on 11 May 2013. Pir Bux Junejo of PML-F won by 90,787 votes and became the member of National Assembly.

General election 2013: NA-234 Sanghar-I
Party	Candidate	Votes	%	±%
PML(F)	Pir Bux Junejo	90,787	55.18	
PPP	Fida Hussain Dero	65,916	40.06	
Others	Others (ten candidates)	7,828	4.76	
Turnout		168,892	59.90	
Total valid votes		164,531	97.42	
Rejected ballots		4,361	2.58	
Majority		24,871	15.12	
Registered electors		281,956		

== Election 2018 ==
General elections are scheduled to be held on 25 July 2018.

General election 2018: NA-215 Sanghar-I
Party	Candidate	Votes	%	±%
PPP	Naveed Dero	77,890	47.11	
GDA	Haji Knuda Bakhsh	77,322	46.76	
PML(N)	Muhammad Ishaq	2,713	1.64	
PTI	Mushtaque	2,626	1.59	
Independent	Saeed Khan Nizamani	2,465	1.49	
Others	Others (five candidates)	2,329	1.41	
Turnout		172,339	54.89	
Total valid votes		165,345	95.94	
Rejected ballots		6,994	4.06	
Majority		568	0.35	
Registered electors		313,950		

== See also ==
- NA-210 Sanghar-II
- NA-212 Mirpur Khas-I
