= Jam Mashooq Ali =

Pakistani politician

- ڄام معشوق علي

Nawab of Sanghar
- In office 1992–2018
- Preceded by: Jam Sadiq Ali
- Succeeded by: Nawab Jam Zulfiquar Ali Khan

Member of the National Assembly of Pakistan
- In office 1990–1993
- Constituency: NA-181 (Sanghar-II)
- Incumbent
- Assumed office 1993
- Incumbent
- Assumed office 1997

Member of the Provincial Assembly of Sindh
- In office 1988–1990
- Constituency: PS-67

Personal details
- Born: Sanghar, Sindh, Pakistan
- Died: 17 November 2018 Houston, United States
- Party: Independent
- Parent: Jam Sadiq Ali (father)
- Relatives: Nawab Jam Zulfiquar Ali Khan(Brother)

Mashooq Ali Khan (Sindhi: معشوق علي خان) also known as Jam Mashooq Ali Khan ( Sindhi: ڄام معشوق علي خان) was a Pakistani politician, federal minister and an advisor to prime minister Nawaz Sharif.

He also was the adviser on the Indus River System Authority (IRSA) Affairs with the status of a Federal Minister in the cabinet of prime minister Shahid Khaqan Abbasi.

== Personal life ==
He was the eldest son of ex chief minister (Sindh) Jam Sadiq Ali.

== Political career ==
In 1988, Jam Mashooq was elected to PS-67 for 8th provincial assembly of Sindh. He became a member of National Assembly of Pakistan (MNA) for NA-181 (Sanghar-II) in the 1990, 1993 and 1997 elections.
