= Shahdadpur railway station =

Railway station in Pakistan

Shahdadpur Railway Station شہدادپور ریلوے اسٹیشن شهدادپور ريلوي اسٽيشن

General information
- Coordinates: 25.9281°N 68.6317°E
- Owner: Ministry of Railways
- Line: Karachi–Peshawar Railway Line

Other information
- Station code: SDU

Services
Preceding station	Pakistan Railways	Following station
Jalal Marri towards Kiamari	Karachi–Peshawar Line	Lundo towards Peshawar Cantonment
Location

Shahdadpur Railway Station (Sindhi: شهدادپور ريلوي اسٽيشن, Urdu: شہدادپور ریلوے اسٹیشن) is located in Shahdadpur city, Sanghar district, Sindh, Pakistan.

== Rehabilitation ==
Pakistan Railways is nearing completion of the rehabilitation and upgrade of Shahdadpur Railway Station's platform, with plans to soon reopen it to passengers in the area. The government has allocated approximately Rs 2 million in additional funds to finalize the renovation of the platform, according to official sources in the Ministry. Shahdadpur Railway Station, equipped with three platforms, holds significance as a key station along the mainline, serving as a stop for many mail and express trains. Construction work had temporarily halted due to outstanding bills and funding issues, but funds have now been secured to resume the remaining rehabilitation efforts. Notably, the platform's condition on the downside was deemed deteriorated, prompting its repair under the category of improvement and welfare expenditure.

== See also ==
- List of railway stations in Pakistan
- Pakistan Railways
