= Tando Mitha Khan =

Pakistani town

Coordinates: 26°00′N 69°12′E

Tando Mitha Khan (Sindhi: ٽنڊو مٺا خان) is a town of Taluka and District Sangher, Sindh, Pakistan. Located on the bank of Nara Canal, this town is connected to Sangher, Khipro and Khairpur Mirs through roads.

This town was founded by Mir Mitha Khan in the 18th century. As of 2017, its population stands at 5,237. It serves as the headquarters for the Town Committee and Deh Tando Mitha Khan. The town is situated 27.8 kilometres (17.3 miles) southeast of Sangher City and 28 kilometres northwest of Khipro town.
