= Jam Sadiq Ali =

Pakistani politician

Nawab Sardar His Excellency Nawab Jam Sadiq Ali Khan
- نواب ڄام صادق علي خان
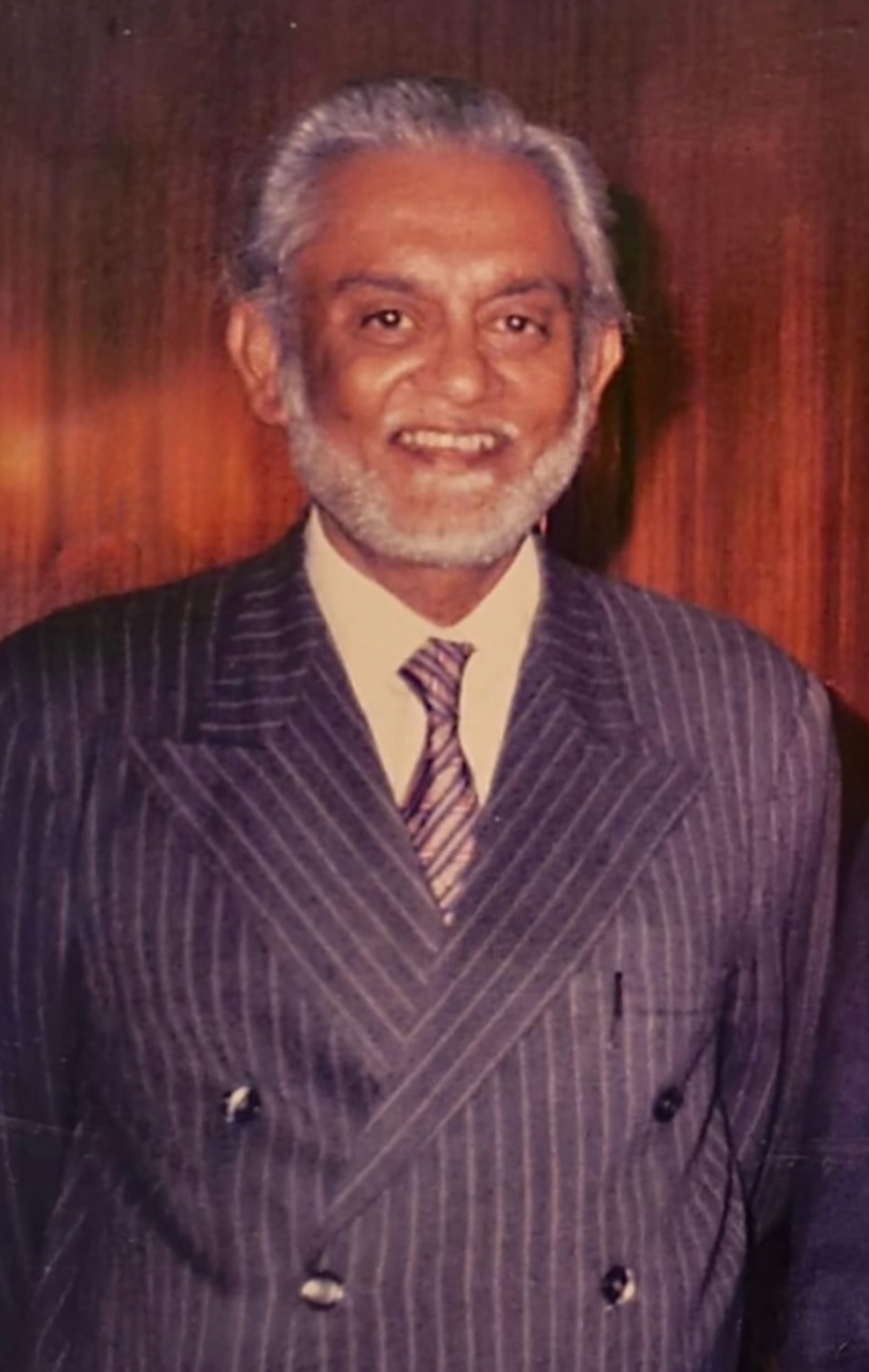

20th Chief Minister of Sindh
- In office 6 August 1990 – 5 March 1992
- Preceded by: Aftab Shahban Mirani
- Succeeded by: Syed Muzaffar Hussain Shah

Nawab of Sanghar
- Preceded by: Nawab Jam Kambhu Khan
- Succeeded by: Nawab Jam Mashooq Ali

Personal details
- Born: 1934 Jam Nawaz Ali, Sanghar District, Sindh
- Died: 5 March 1992 (aged 57–58) Karachi
- Party: Independent
- Profession: Nawab of Sanghar, Politician

Nawab Jam Sadiq Ali (Urdu: جام صادق علی) (ca. 1934– 5 March 1992) was a politician from Sindh, Pakistan. He was the Nawab of Sanghar and Sardar of Junejo tribe and belonged to the ruling dynasty of Samaa Ja'ams who ruled Sindh over two centuries up to middle of 1700. He died in March 1992, and was succeeded by his son Nawab Jam Mashooq Ali Khan. Nawab Jam Mashooq Ali Khan, who had served as a federal minister and a member of the National Assembly of Pakistan multiple times, died in 2018 and was succeeded by Nawab Jam Zulfiquar Ali Khan, who is the current Chief of the Samaa Dynasty, Chief of Juneja tribe and Nawab of Sanghar.

== Life ==
Jam Sadiq Ali Khan was Chief Minister of Sindh from 6 August 1990 to 5 March 1992. He was the Sardar of the Samma Jam and Junejo tribes and the Nawab of Sanghar. During Benazir Bhutto's 20-month Government, Nawab Jam Sadiq Ali served as an adviser but eventually resigned because of differences and was an archenemy of former Prime Minister Benazir Bhutto. After Benazir Bhutto was forced to step down in August 1990 because of corruption charges, he was elected Chief Minister of Sindh.

Jam Sadiq Ali died on 5 March 1992 at 57-years-old of cirrhosis at his home in Karachi. The Sindh government then declared three days of mourning, closing government offices and schools.

Preceded by Aftab Shaban Mirani	Chief Minister of Sindh; 1990–1992	Succeeded by Muzaffar Hussain Shah
