= Jheol =

Village in Pakistan

Jheol is a small town in Sanghar District, Sindh, Pakistan. It is located about 3 km from Sanghar and is on the way to Hyderabad from Sanghar.
