= PS-43 Sanghar-IV =

Constituency of the Provincial Assembly of Sindh, Pakistan

- Constituency for the Provincial Assembly of Sindh
- Region: Tando Adam Tehsil and Shahdadpur Tehsil (partly) of Sanghar District
- Electorate: 249,439

Current constituency
- Member: Vacant
- Created from: PS-82 Sanghar-V (2002-2018); PS-43 Sanghar-III (2018-2023)

PS-43 Sanghar-IV (پی ایس-43، سانگھڑ-4) is a constituency of the Provincial Assembly of Sindh.

== General elections 2024 ==
Provincial election 2024: PS-43 Sanghar-IV
Party	Candidate	Votes	%	±%
PPP	Sardar Paras Dero	68,432	65.44	
GDA	Niaz Hussain	23,891	22.85	
PTI	Muhammad Ayoob (Note: Filed nomination papers as PTI candidate but ECP allowed him to run as an Independent)	5,540	5.30	
JI	Mushtaque Ahmed Adil	3,566	3.41	
Others	Others (nine candidates)	3,141	3.00	
Turnout		107,679	43.17	
Total valid votes		104,570	97.11	
Rejected ballots		3,109	2.89	
Majority		44,541	42.59	
Registered electors		249,439		
PPP hold				

== General elections 2018 ==
Provincial election 2018: PS-43 Sanghar-III
Party	Candidate	Votes	%	±%
PPP	Jam Madad Ali Khan	44,750	59.01	
GDA	Jam Zulifqar Ali Khan	28,495	37.57	
MMA	Irfan Ali	901	1.19	
Independent	Qurban Ali	407	0.54	
Independent	Muhammad Saleh	335	0.44	
Independent	Jam Zaheer Ali Khan	275	0.36	
Independent	Jam Nafees Ali Khan	252	0.33	
Independent	Muhammad Aslam	127	0.17	
Independent	Jam Shabbir Ali Khan	121	0.16	
Independent	Abdul Sattar	97	0.13	
Independent	Raza Muhammad	27	0.04	
Independent	Mir Khan	20	0.03	
Independent	Muhammad Qasim	17	0.02	
Independent	Ahmad Hassan Kerio	16	0.02	
Majority		16,255	21.44	
Valid ballots		75,840		
Rejected ballots		3,265		
Turnout		79,105		
Registered electors		142,704		
hold				

== General elections 2013 ==
Contesting candidates	Party affiliation	Votes polled

== General elections 2008 ==
Contesting candidates	Party affiliation	Votes polled

== See also ==
- PS-42 Sanghar-III
- PS-44 Sanghar-V
