= Jalal Marri railway station =

Railway station in Pakistan

Jalal Marri Railway Station جلال مری ریلوے اسٹیشن جلال مري ريلوي اسٽيشن

General information
- Coordinates: 25.8462°N 68.6645°E
- Owner: Ministry of Railways
- Line: Karachi–Peshawar Railway Line

Other information
- Station code: JLMR

Services
Preceding station	Pakistan Railways	Following station
Tando Adam Junction towards Kiamari	Karachi–Peshawar Line	Shahdadpur towards Peshawar Cantonment
Location

Jalal Marri Railway Station (Urdu: جلال مري ریلوي اسٽیشن, Sindhi: جلال مري ریلوي اسٽیشن) is located in Jalal Marri village, Sanghar district of Sindh, Pakistan.

== See also ==
- List of railway stations in Pakistan
- Pakistan Railways
