= PS-41 Sanghar-II =

Constituency of the Provincial Assembly of Sindh, Pakistan

- Constituency for the Provincial Assembly of Sindh
- Region: Khipro Tehsil and Sanghar Tehsil (partly) of Sanghar District
- Electorate: 248,842

Current constituency
- Member: Vacant
- Created from: PS-80 Sanghar-III (2002-2018); PS-41 Sanghar-I (2018-2023)

PS-41 Sanghar-II (پی ایس-41، سانگھڑ-2) is a constituency of the Provincial Assembly of Sindh.

== General elections 2024 ==
Provincial election 2024: PS-41 Sanghar-II
Party	Candidate	Votes	%	±%
PPP	Ali Hassan Hingorjo	64,496	49.40	
GDA	Qazi Shamas Din	62,708	48.03	
Others	Others (fifteen candidates)	3,350	2.57	
Turnout		138,100	55.50	
Total valid votes		130,554	94.54	
Rejected ballots		7,546	5.46	
Majority		1,788	1.37	
Registered electors		248,842		
PPP gain from GDA				

== General elections 2018 ==
Provincial election 2018: PS-41 Sanghar-I
Party	Candidate	Votes	%	±%
GDA	Ali Ghulam	36,081	46.73	
PPP	Mashooque Ali	35,935	46.54	
PML(N)	Maqsooda Bibi	1,729	2.24	
PTI	Nasrullah	1,721	2.23	
Independent	Muhammad Hassan	563	0.73	
AWP	Hassan Askari	477	0.62	
Independent	Rafique Ahmed	298	0.39	
PST	Shoaib Farooq	188	0.24	
Independent	Muhammad Nazim	92	0.12	
Independent	Majid	60	0.08	
Independent	Darehan Khan	44	0.06	
Independent	Kifayat Ali Laskani	26	0.03	
Majority		146	0.19	
Valid ballots		77,214		
Rejected ballots		3,013		
Turnout		80,227		
Registered electors		156,313		
hold				

== General elections 2013 ==
Contesting candidates	Party affiliation	Votes polled

== General elections 2008 ==
Contesting candidates	Party affiliation	Votes polled

== See also ==
- PS-40 Sanghar-I
- PS-42 Sanghar-III
