= Lundo railway station =

Railway station in Pakistan

Lundo Railway Station لنڈو ریلوے اسٹیشن لنڊو ريلوي اسٽيشن

General information
- Coordinates: 26.0282°N 68.5470°E
- Owner: Ministry of Railways
- Line: Karachi–Peshawar Railway Line

Other information
- Station code: LDO

Services
Preceding station	Pakistan Railways	Following station
Shahdadpur towards Kiamari	Karachi–Peshawar Line	Sarhari towards Peshawar Cantonment
Location

Lundo Railway Station (Urdu: لنڈو ریلوے اسٹیشن, Sindhi: لنڊو ریلوي اسٽیشن) is located in Lundu village Sanghar district, Sindh, Pakistan.

== See also ==
- List of railway stations in Pakistan
- Pakistan Railways
