= Karam Khan Nizamani =

Village in Pakistan

Coordinates: 27°07′N 68°25′E

aqar Khan Nizamani is a village near Shahdadpur in Sindh, Pakistan.

It is situated near Hala Shahdadpur Road. It has an overall population of 3,000, with other villages which either have no proper name or are known as Baqar Mori.

It has two primary schools, one for boys and one for girls, and two high schools, also one for boys and one for girls. There is also the government-run Lal Dino Baqar Khan Nizamani higher secondary school at Baqar Mori Hala Shahdadpur Road and a private school, the Sindh Bright School. There is one hospital, funded by the government, and also a beautiful irrigation system.

For the last 25 years the only political party here has been the Pakistan People's Party.
