= PS-44 Sanghar-V =

Constituency of the Provincial Assembly of Sindh, Pakistan

- Constituency for the Provincial Assembly of Sindh
- Region: Shahdadpur Tehsil (partly) including Shahdadpur city of Sanghar District
- Electorate: 248,150

Current constituency
- Member: Vacant
- Created from: PS-83 Sanghar-VI (2002-2018); PS-44 Sanghar-IV and PS-45 Sanghar-V (2018-2023)

PS-44 Sanghar-V (پی ایس-44، سانگھڑ-5) is a constituency of the Provincial Assembly of Sindh.

== General elections 2024 ==
Provincial election 2024: PS-44 Sanghar-V
| Party | Candidate | Votes | % | ±% |
|---|---|---|---|---|
| PPP | Shahid Thahim | 60,411 | 51.89 | |
| GDA | Muhammad Bux | 49,144 | 42.21 | |
| PTI | Muhammad Kashif Ameen (Note: Filed nomination papers as PTI candidate but ECP allowed him to run as an Independent) | 4,168 | 3.58 | |
| Others | Others (twenty five candidates) | 2,692 | 2.32 | |
| Turnout | | 119,985 | 48.35 | |
| Total valid votes | | 116,415 | 97.03 | |
| Rejected ballots | | 3,570 | 2.97 | |
| Majority | | 11,267 | 9.68 | |
| Registered electors | | 248,150 | | |
| PPP hold | | | | |

== General elections 2018 ==
Provincial election 2018: PS-44 Sanghar-IV
| Party | Candidate | Votes | % | ±% |
|---|---|---|---|---|
| PPP | Faraz Dero | 54,156 | 70.87 | |
| GDA | Niaz Hussain | 13,711 | 17.94 | |
| MMA | Mushtaque Ahmed Adil | 3,377 | 4.42 | |
| PTI | Ghulam Mustafa | 1,183 | 1.55 | |
| Independent | Deeba Sahar Khoso | 1,057 | 1.38 | |
| Independent | Jahangeer Khan | 904 | 1.18 | |
| MQM-P | Fareed Nawaz | 403 | 0.53 | |
| PP | Muhammad Sultan | 357 | 0.47 | |
| Independent | Paras Dero | 322 | 0.42 | |
| Independent | Muhammad Ayoub | 230 | 0.30 | |
| Independent | Irshad Ali Ansari | 131 | 0.17 | |
| MQM-H | Muhammad Farhan Khan | 123 | 0.16 | |
| Independent | Imtiaz Ali | 100 | 0.13 | |
| SUP | Shafi Muhammad | 86 | 0.11 | |
| PSP | Danish Deedar | 73 | 0.10 | |
| Independent | Khadim Ali | 58 | 0.08 | |
| Independent | Shakeel Ahmed Urf Karimdad | 50 | 0.07 | |
| Independent | Ghulam Ghous Dogar | 47 | 0.06 | |
| Independent | Muhammad Waseem | 30 | 0.04 | |
| Independent | Lala Usama Khan | 17 | 0.02 | |
| Independent | Yousuf Ali Shah | 6 | 0.01 | |
| Majority | | 40,445 | 52.93 | |
| Valid ballots | | 76,421 | | |
| Rejected ballots | | 3,549 | | |
| Turnout | | 79,970 | | |
| Registered electors | | 175,654 | | |
| hold | | | | |

== General elections 2013 ==
| Contesting candidates | Party affiliation | Votes polled |

== General elections 2008 ==
| Contesting candidates | Party affiliation | Votes polled |

== See also ==
- PS-43 Sanghar-IV
- PS-45 Mirpur Khas-I
