= Deh No. 22 Jamrao =

Coordinates: 26°7′52.92″N 68°48′7.32″E

Deh No. 22 Jamrao also known as Chak No. 22 in Sanghar District (Urdu: ضلع سانگھڑ; Sindhi: ضلعو سانگھڙ) is one of the largest villages in district Sanghar of Sindh province, Pakistan. It is located between Sanghar and Nawab Shah districts and is bounded to the north by Khairpur district.

Deh No. 22 Jamrao is roughly 50 miles (60 km) away from Nawabshah in south easterly direction towards Sanghar. Its neighbouring villages are Chak 22- A Alf, Chak No. 24, Chak 25/A/B/C/ and Makhai area. The village is mainly an agricultural area. Its primary source of income is agriculture. According to the 2010 census of Pakistan, the population was 10,053.

== Schools ==
- Ambassador Public School is one of the leading schools in town.
- The Government Higher Secondary School was formally opened by Salahuddin Qureshi Civil Services of Pakistan on 8 November 1965 under the name District Council High School Deh 22 Jamrao.
- The Government Boys Primary School provides basic education for young boys.
