= Shazia Marri =

Pakistani politician (born 1966)

- شازیہ مری

Minister for Poverty Alleviation and Social Safety
- In office 18 April 2022 – 10 August 2023
- Preceded by: Sania Nishtar

Member of the National Assembly of Pakistan
- Incumbent
- Assumed office 29 February 2024
- Constituency: NA-209 Sanghar-I
- In office 13 August 2018 – 10 August 2023
- Constituency: NA-216 (Sanghar-II)
- In office 30 August 2013 – 31 May 2018
- Constituency: NA-235 (Sanghar-II)
- In office 6 July 2012 – 30 August 2013
- Constituency: Reserved seats for women

Member of Provincial Assembly of Sindh
- In office 2008 – July 2012
- In office 2002–2008

Personal details
- Born: 8 October 1966 (age 59) Karachi, Sindh, Pakistan
- Party: PPP (2002-present)
- Parent: Atta Muhammad Marri (father)

Shazia Atta Marri (Urdu: شازیہ عطا مری; born 8 October 1966), also known as Shazia Jannat Marri, is a Pakistani politician, former Federal Minister and Chairperson of Benazir Income Support Programme. She has been a member of the National Assembly of Pakistan since February 2024 and previously served in this position from July 2012 to August 2013, from August 2013 to May 2018, and from August 2018 till August 2023. She was the Minister for Poverty Alleviation and Social Safety from April 2022 to August 2023.

== Early life and education ==
She was born on 8 October 1966 in Karachi, to former Deputy Speaker of the Sindh Assembly Atta Muhammad Marri, into a Baloch family.

Her grandfather Ali Muhammad was also politician and was member of legislative assembly during British government from 1944 to 1945. Moreover, her mother Parveen Marri has also remained member of Sindh Assembly during 1985–86. She has a BA degree.

== Political career ==
She was elected to Provincial Assembly of Sindh in the 2002 Pakistani general election.

She served as Provincial Minister of Sindh for Electric before appointed as Provincial Minister of Sindh for Information from 2008 to 2010.

She was re-elected to Provincial Assembly of Sindh in the 2008 Pakistani general election from PS-133 on reserved seat for women, representing Pakistan Peoples Party (PPP). In July 2012, she resigned from the seat.

In July 2012, she was elected to the National Assembly of Pakistan as a candidate of PPP on a seat reserved for women from Sindh.

She ran for the seat of National Assembly in the 2013 Pakistani general election from NA-235 (Sanghar-II), but was unsuccessful.

She was re-elected to the National Assembly of Pakistan on reserved seat for women in the 2013 election.

In July 2013, she was elected to the National Assembly in by-election from NA-235 (Sanghar-II).

She was re-elected to the National Assembly as a candidate of PPP from NA-216 (Sanghar-II) in the 2018 Pakistani general election. She received 80,770 votes and defeated Kishan Chand Parwani, a candidate of the Grand Democratic Alliance (GDA). In the same election, she was re-elected to the National Assembly as a candidate of PPP on a seat reserved for women from Sindh.

She was re-elected to the National Assembly as a candidate of PPP from NA-209 Sanghar-I in the 2024 Pakistani general election. She received 156,723 votes and defeated Muhammad Khan Junejo, a candidate of the GDA.
