= Shahid Abdul Salam Thahim =

Pakistani politician

- شاهد عبدالسلام ٿهيم

Member of the Provincial Assembly of Sindh
- In office 13 August 2018 – 11 August 2023
- Constituency: PS-45 Sanghar-V
- In office 29 May 2013 – 28 May 2017

Personal details
- Born: 12 January 1972 (age 54) Sanghar, Sindh, Pakistan
- Party: PPP (2013-present)
- Parent: Abdul Salam Thahim

Shahid Abdul Salam Thahim (Sindhi: شاهد عبدالسلام ٿهيمborn 12 January 1972) is a Pakistani politician who had been a Member of the Provincial Assembly of Sindh, from August 2018 till August 2023 and from May 2013 to May 2018.

== Early life and education ==
He was born on 12 January 1972.

He has a degree of Bachelor of Engineering in Civil Technology from Mehran University of Engineering and Technology and a Master of Arts from Sindh University.

== Political career ==
He was elected to the Provincial Assembly of Sindh as a candidate of Pakistan Peoples Party (PPP) from Constituency PS-83 SANGHAR-VI in the 2013 Pakistani general election.

He was re-elected to Provincial Assembly of Sindh as a candidate of PPP from Constituency PS-45 (Sanghar-V) in the 2018 Pakistani general election.
