= Atta Muhammad Marri =

Pakistani politician

Atta Muhammad Marri (1937–1998) was a Sindhi politician hailing from a political agricultural family of Sindh. His father Ali Muhammad Marri was an influential politician of his time and remained a member of the Legislative Assembly during the British Raj,

Atta Muhammad Marri remained a Member of the West Pakistan Assembly in 1967, and Member of the National Assembly of Pakistan in the 1970s and 1980s, a member of the Majlis-e-Shura during Zia ul Haq's time, and the Deputy Speaker of the Sindh Assembly from 1990 to 1993.

Atta Muhammad Marri died on 2 March 1998. His daughter Shazia Marri is a Member National Assembly.

== See also ==
- Sindh Assembly
- Shazia Marri
