= Jhol =

Town in Sindh, Pakistan

- Interactive map of Jhol
- Country: Pakistan
- Province: Sindh

Population (2023)
  - Total: 19,363

Jhol (Sindhi: جھول) is a small town In Sanghar District, Sindh, Pakistan. This town is located at distance of about 12 kilometers in the south west of Sangher along Hyderabad Sangher Highway.

This town had a railway station along the Mirpurkhas Nawabshah section but currently no train service is available on this line. The population of the town is 50,792 (2017).
