= Sarhari =

Pakistani town

Coordinates: 26°06′N 68°29′E

- Town
- Location within Sindh Location within Pakistan
- Country: Pakistan
- Province: Sindh
- Division: Shaheed Benazir Abad
- District: Sanghar
- Tehsil: Shahdadpur

Government
  - Type: Town Committee

Population (2022)
  - City: 128,958
- Time zone: UTC+5 (PKT)
- Postal code: 68010

Sarhari (سرھاڙي) is a small town of tehsil Shahdadpur, Sanghar District, Sindh province, Pakistan. It is on the main railway Line. It is known for its large exports of bananas.

Sarhari is linked with Shahdadpur, New Saeedabad of Matiari District, and Sakrand of Shaheed Benazirabad District by road. It is also connected with Nawabshah by road. Nawabshah, the fifth largest city of Sindh, is 20 km from Sarhari.

Sarhari is a business town, with a for market of clothes, sweet desserts and fruits.

There is a Rural Health Centre Sarhari and a Government Higher Secondary School Sarhari

Sarhari has a town committee. There are 5 dehs in Sarhari TC: Bero Zardari, Gul Muhammad Leghari, Mano Jamali, Muva Chhora, and Paboro.

It is an agricultural town that produces a variety of cotton and wheat. It is also called the Hand made Mountain City, because there are big mountains of wheat straw around the city.
