= Sardar Paras Dero =

Member of the Provincial Assembly of Sindh from Sanghar (2024–2029)

- سردار پارس ڏيرو

Member of the Provincial Assembly of Sindh
- Incumbent
- Assumed office 25 February 2024
- Constituency: PS-43 Sanghar-IV

Personal details
- Party: PPP (2024-present)

Sardar Paras Dero (Sindhi: سردار پارس ڏيرو ; Urdu: سردار پارس ڈیرو) is a Pakistani politician who is member of the Provincial Assembly of Sindh.

Dero won the 2024 Sindh provincial election from PS-43 Sanghar-IV as a Pakistan People’s Party candidate. He received 67,851 votes while runner up Niaz Hussain of Grand Democratic Alliance received 23,869 votes.
