= Khipro, Pakistan =

Tehsil in Sindh, Pakistan

Khipro
- Town
- Location of Khipro Khipro (Pakistan) Khipro (South Asia) Khipro (Asia)
- Coordinates: 25.823°N 69.377°E
- Country: Pakistan
- Province: Sindh
- District: Sanghar
- Elevation: 28 m (92 ft)

Population (2023 Census)
  - City: 58,307
- Time zone: UTC+5 (PST)

Khipro (Urdu: کھپرو, Sindhi :کپرو ) is a town in Sanghar District in the Sindh province of Pakistan. Khipro is the tehsil headquarter of Khipro tehsil.

== Demographics ==
Population

Historical population
Census	Population	±%
1972	8,224	—
1981	14,200	▲72.7%
1998	25,580	▲80.1%
2017	50,996	▲99.4%
2023	58,307	▲14.3%

According to the 2023 census, Khipro town had a population of 58,307 inhabitants.

Languages

Languages of Khipro Town (2023 Census)
1. Sindhi (72.8%)
2. Urdu (20.3%)
3. Punjabi (2.30%)
4. Balochi (2.00%)
5. Pashto (1.70%)
6. Others (0.90%)
