= Khuhra =

Coordinates: 27°22′50″N 68°31′0″E

- Interactive map of Khuhra
- Country: Pakistan
- Province: Sindh

Population (2023)
  - Total: 24,341

Khuhra is an historical city in Khairpur District Sindh province of Pakistan. It is approximately 6 to 7 hours of drive from Karachi.
