= Bozdar Wada =

Bozdar Wada بوزدار وڏا بوزدار وڈا
- Location within Sindh
- Coordinates: 27°11′3.412″N 68°38′11.409″E
- Country: Pakistan
- Province: Sindh
- District: Khairpur

Population (2017)
  - Total: 16,713
- Time zone: UTC+5 (PST)

Bozdar Wada (Sindhi: بوزدار وڏا, Urdu: بوزدار وڈا) is a populated place in Thari Mirwah Taluka in Sindh province of Pakistan. It is located approximately 50 kilometers from the city of Khairpur, and approximately 30 kilometers from the ancient Kot Diji fort. Bozdar Wada has status of Town.
