= Khadro =

- town
- Khadro Sharif Sindh Khadro
- Location within Pakistan
- Coordinates: 26.147°N 68.718°E
- Country: Pakistan
- Province: Sindh
- District: Sanghar District
- Sub-District: Sinjhoro

Area
  - Total: 3 km^{2} (1.2 sq mi)

Population
  - Estimate (2023): 35,000
- Time zone: UTC+5 (PST)

Khadro (Sindhi: کھڈرو, Urdu: کھدرو) is a town that is located in Sub-District Sinjhoro, Sanghar District of Sindh Province, Pakistan. It is a developing town that has primary source of income for people is trade of crops business due to the different crops produced in the area such as are wheat, cotton, etc. There is a famous tomb of Hazrat Hameer Faqeer located in town. The town population is approximately 35,000 and 95% of the population belongs to the Muslim community and there is 3–4% Hindu population. Its distance from Karachi is about 270 kilometers. Its main link road is Sanghar Nawabshah Road, from which it connects to different areas of Sanghar District.

== Location ==
Khadro location is a prime point for its town. It is located between the Sanghar district and the Nawabshah Division. There is distance from Khadro town to Nawbashah Division is 34 Kilometers, and the distance from Khadro town to Sanghar is 26 kilometers It has a main transportation stop. There is a bus service that starts from Khadro to Karachi division that is owned by Javed Brothers and it is the most convenient way to reach Karachi.

== Transportation ==
Khadro has two types of transportation paths. One is the bus transport and Taxi service. There is a main bus service that starts from Javed Brothers and that is convenient to reach Karachi. It has a main bus stop with transport buses passes for different areas of Sindh that goes from Umerkot Thar to Sukkur. Taxi services are also there for people.

== Agriculture ==
There is a wide range of nearby land that mostly produces different crops like wheat, cotton, etc. A huge amount of business is carried out during agricultural seasons like wheat and cotton.

== Business ==
The businesses that are working in town are trading of crops, a general store, electric stores, medical stores, cloth shops, confectionery stores, grocery shops, print shops, and restaurants

== Education ==
The grade of education that you can gain in town is 12th grade and few private and government schools are there in five five-star Public School, Paragon School are private schools. The government schools are from Grade 1 to grade 12. Government schools are Government Primary Schools, Government Boys higher and Secondary School Khadro, Government Girls Higher and secondary school Khadro and there are tuition centres for students.

== Gallery ==
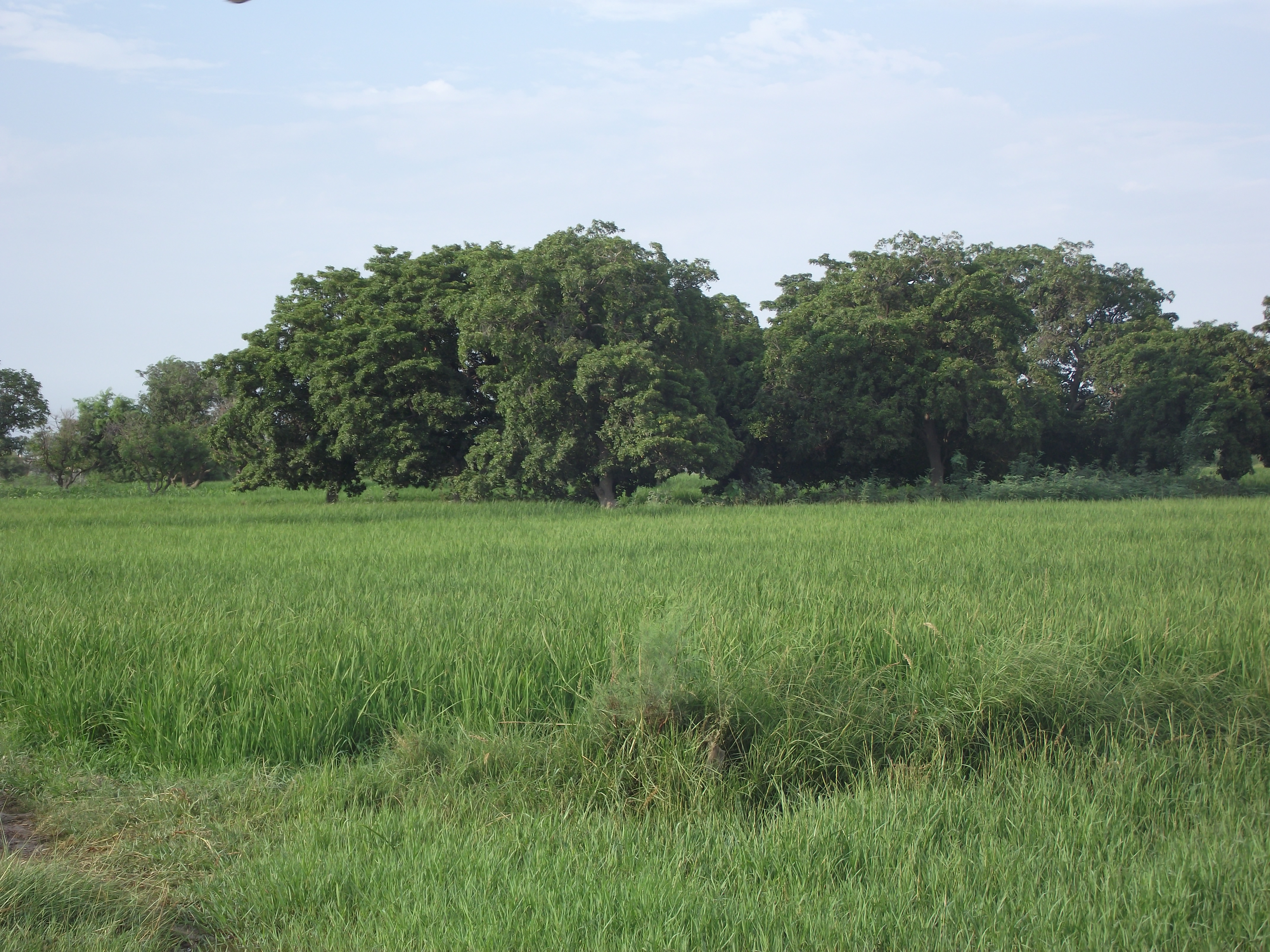
Mango trees in Khadro

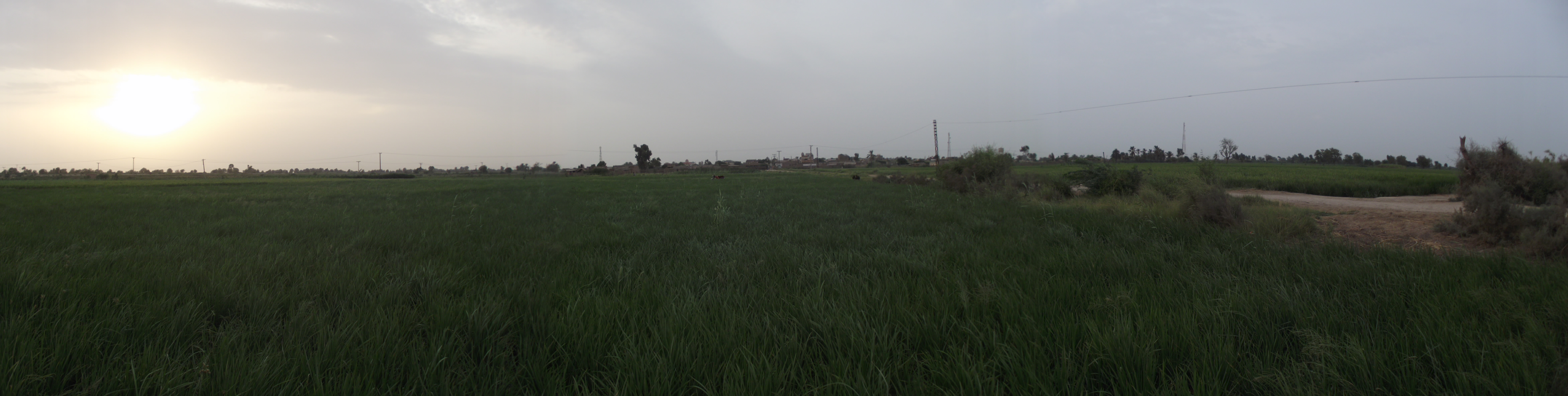
Rice Field in Khadro

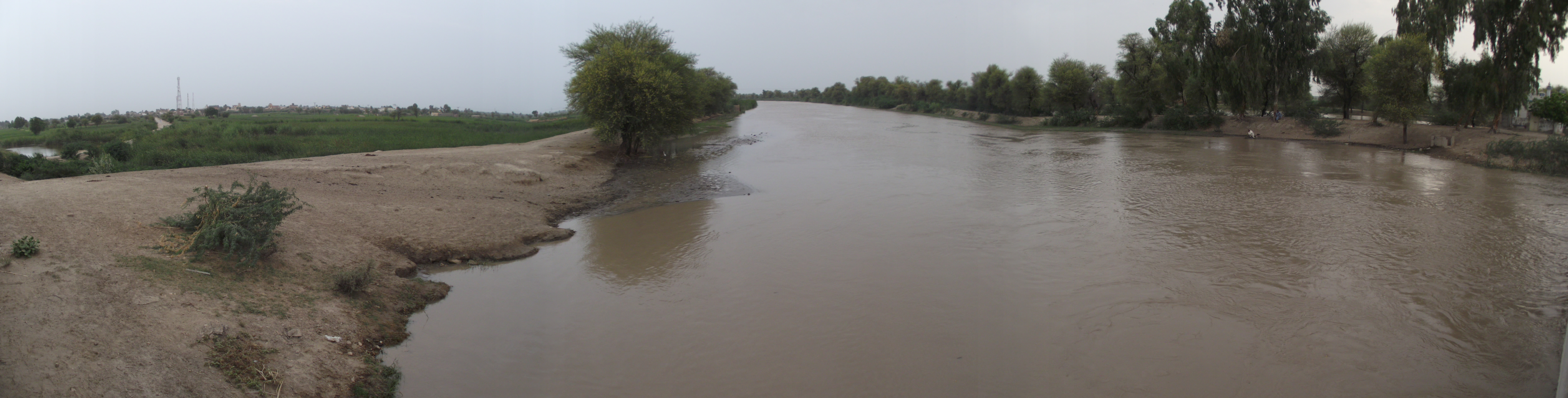
Jamrao canal

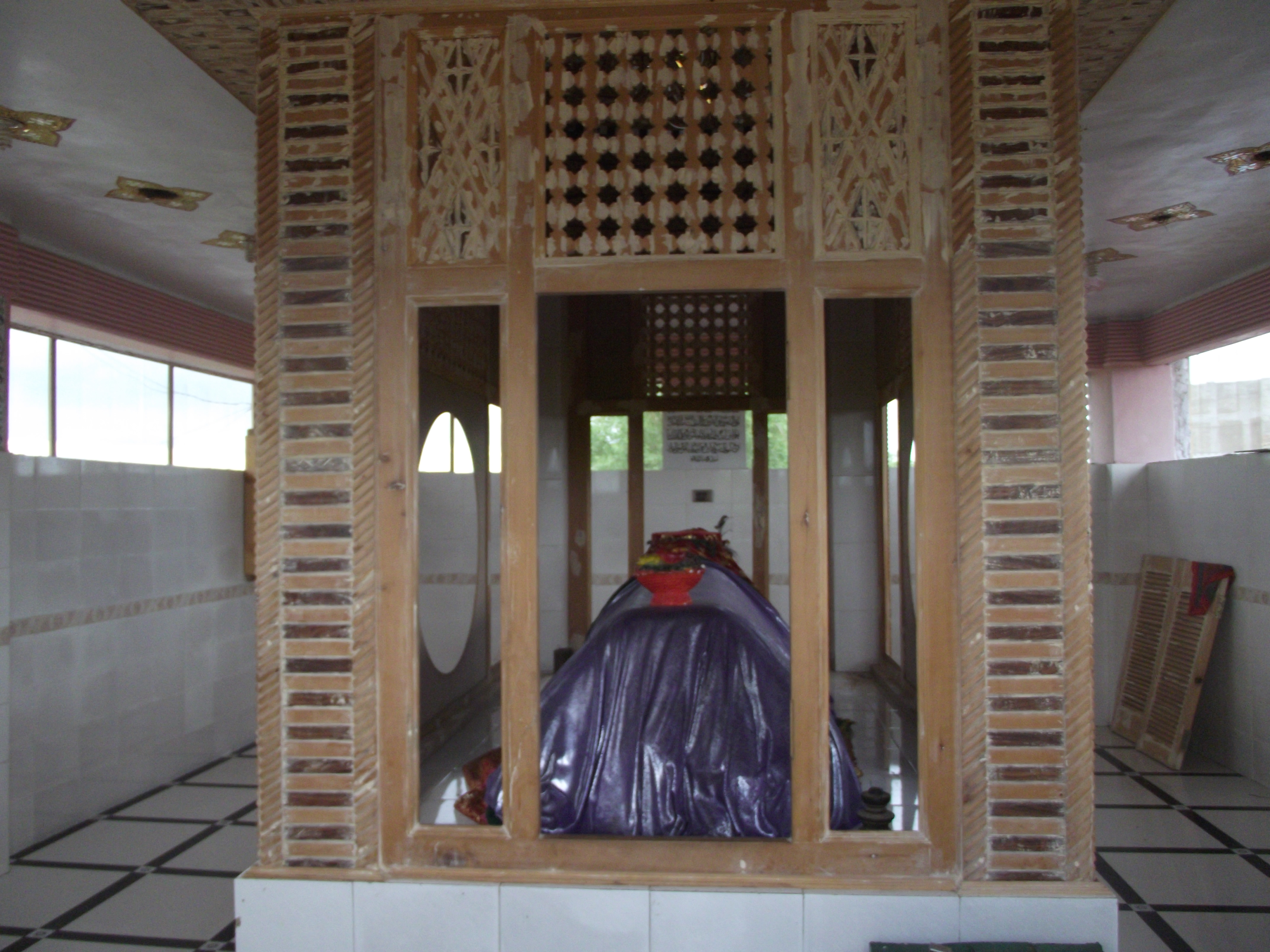
Hamir Faqeer's tomb

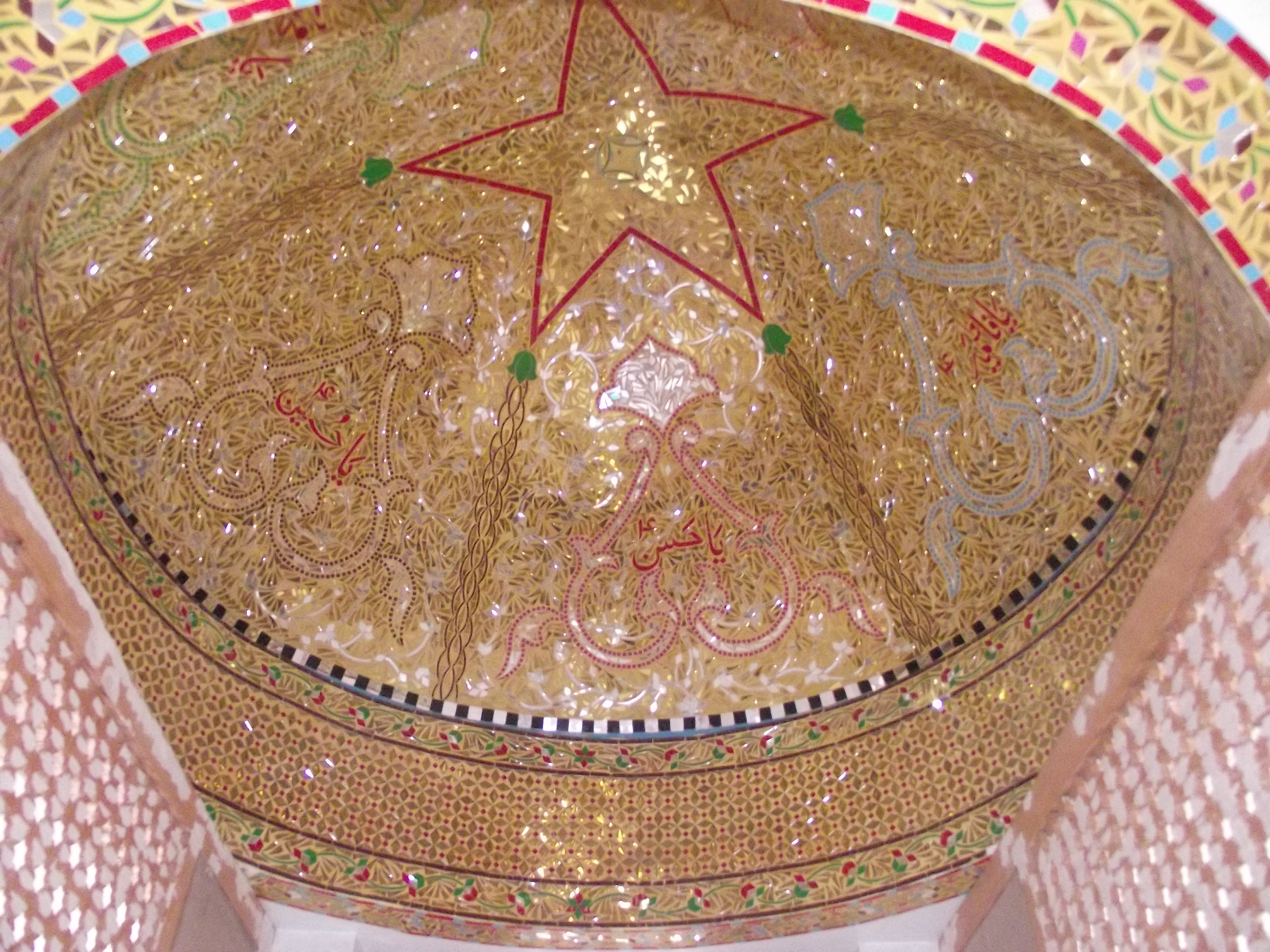
Inside Hamir Faqeer's tomb

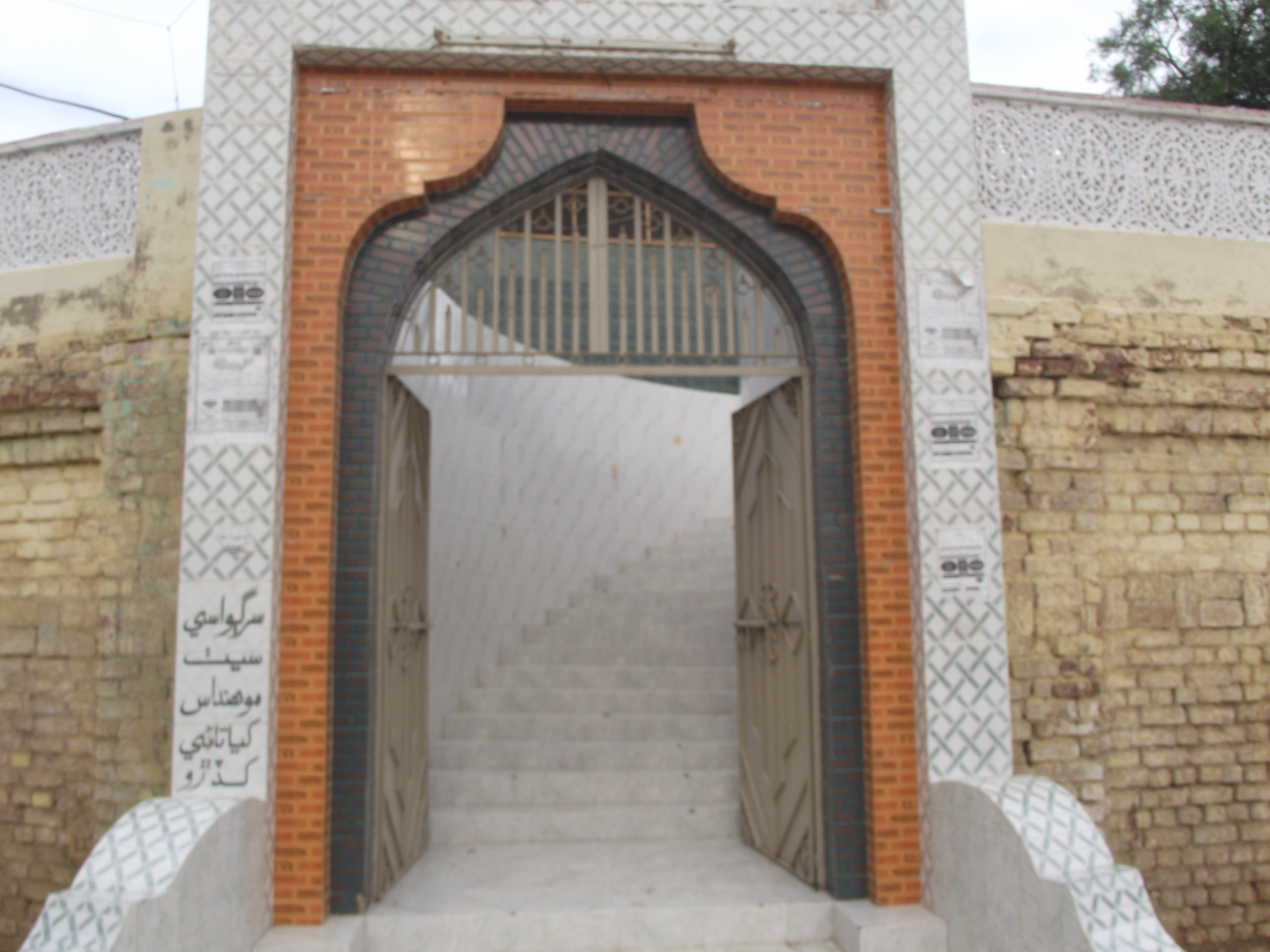
Entrance to the tomb of Hamir Faqir
