= Ghulam Dastageer Rajar =

Member of the Provincial Assembly of Sindh from Sanghar (2024–2029)

- غلام دستگير راڄڙ

Member of the Provincial Assembly of Sindh
- Incumbent
- Assumed office 25 February 2024
- Constituency: PS-40 Sanghar-I

Personal details
- Party: GDA (2024-present)

Ghulam Dastageer Rajar (Sindhi: غلام دستگير راڄڙ ;Urdu: غلام دستگیر راجڑ) is a Pakistani politician who is member of the Provincial Assembly of Sindh.

== Political career ==
Rajar won the 2024 Sindh provincial election from PS-40 Sanghar-I as a Grand Democratic Alliance candidate. He received 56,345 votes while runner up Naveed Dero of Pakistan People’s Party received 52,923 votes.
