= Ali Hassan Hingorjo =

Member of the Provincial Assembly of Sindh from Sanghar (2024–2029)

- علي حسن هنگورجو

Member of the Provincial Assembly of Sindh
- Incumbent
- Assumed office 25 February 2024
- Constituency: PS-41 Sanghar-II

Personal details
- Party: PPP (2024-present)

Ali Hassan Hingorjo (Sindhi:علي حسن هنگورجو; Urdu: علی حسن ہِنگورجو) is a Pakistani politician who is member of the Provincial Assembly of Sindh.

== Political career ==
Hingorjo won the 2024 Sindh provincial election from PS-41 Sanghar-II as a Pakistan People’s Party candidate. He received 63,750 votes while runner up Qazi Shamas Din of Grand Democratic Alliance received 62,118 votes.
