= Sanjar Chang =

Coordinates: 25.4500°N 68.7167°E

- Union council
- Sanjar Chang is located in the south-east of the district.
- Interactive map of Sanjar Chang
- Country: Pakistan
- Province: Sindh
- District: Tando Allahyar
- Tehsil: Chamber

Government
  - Nazim: LAKHA DINO
  - Naib Nazim: ZULFIQAR ALI THEBO

Population
  - Total: 35,169

Sanjar Chang is a town and union council of Tando Allahyar District in the Sindh Province of Pakistan. It is part of Chamber Taluka and is located in the south-east of the district, the Union Council has a population of 35,169.

== See also ==
- Ramapir Temple Tando Allahyar
