= Muhammad Jadam Mangrio =

Pakistani politician (died 2020)

- محمد جادم منڱريو

Member of the National Assembly of Pakistan
- In office March 2008 – March 2013
- Constituency: NA-234 (Sanghar-I)

Personal details
- Party: Pakistan Muslim League Functional.PML-F Sindh
- Children: 1

Muhammad Jadam Mangrio (Sindhi: محمد جادم منڱريو) was a Pakistani politician who was a member of the National Assembly of Pakistan from March 2008 to March 2013.

== Political career ==
Mangrio was considered a close aide of Pir Pagara. During the Pervez Musharraf government, he was an advisor on fisheries in the provincial cabinet of Sindh under Arbab Ghulam Rahim. He was elected to the National Assembly of Pakistan as a candidate of Pakistan Muslim League (F) (PML-F) from Constituency NA-234 (Sanghar-I) in the 2008 Pakistani general election. He received 71,394 votes and defeated Ghulam Muhammad Junejo, a candidate of Pakistan Peoples Party (PPP). During his tenure as MNA, he served as the minister of state for railways in the Ashraf ministry.

He ran for the seat of the Provincial Assembly of Sindh as a candidate of PML-F from Constituency PS-69 (Umerkot-cum-Sanghar) in the 2013 Pakistani general election but was unsuccessful. He received 31,408 votes and lost the seat to Syed Sardar Ali Shah.

== Death ==
Mangrio died aged 63 on 25 November 2020 in Karachi, after contracting COVID-19 which caused complications. He was buried in his hometown of Umerkot.
