= Jam Shabbir Ali Khan =

Pakistani politician

- ڄام شبير علي خان

Member of the Provincial Assembly of Sindh
- In office 25 February 2021 – 11 August 2023
- Constituency: PS-43 Sanghar-III

Personal details
- Party: GDA (2024-present)
- Other political affiliations: PPP (2018-2024)

Jam Shabbir Ali Khan (Sindhi: ڄام شبير علي خان) is a Pakistani politician who had been a member of the Provincial Assembly of Sindh from February 2021 till August 2023.

Born to Jam Anwar Ali Khan in Sindh, he was elected a member of the Provincial Assembly of Sindh in February 2021 by-election in which he got 48,028 votes and won the PS-43 Sanghar constituency defeating Mushtaq Junejo who got 6,925 votes.
