= Orh =

Indian caste

The Orh (also known as Oad, Odh, Orh Rajput or Orad Rajput) is a community of drifting labourers in Gujarat, Kathiawar, and parts of Rajasthan. They are said to hold a variety of occupations. As artisans, they are carpenters, masons and stoneworkers and were considered to be Dalits. As traders, they deal in grain, spices, perfumes, and cloth. They are spread across 40 villages in Uttarakhand and Uttar Pradesh where they bear surnames like Gadahi, Bhagat, Galgat, Kahlia, Kudavali, Maangal, Majoka, Mundai, Sarvana, and Virpali. The Orh are recognised as part of the Other Backward Classes (OBC) in the state of Rajasthan. In Pakistan, the community is settled in Sindh, Balochistan and lower Punjab, where their primary occupation is to build mud-houses, locally referred to as Oadki houses.
