= Sinjhoro Tehsil =

Pakistani administrative area

Sinhjoro Taluka
- Tehsil
- Location within Sindh
- Coordinates: 26°01′N 68°48′E
- Country: Pakistan
- Province: Sindh
- District: Sanghar

Government
  - MPA: Jam Shabbir Ali Khan

Area
  - Total: 907 km^{2} (350 sq mi)

Population (2023)
  - Total: 354,709
  - Density: 391/km^{2} (1,010/sq mi)
- Time zone: UTC+5 (PST)
- Number of Union Councils: 8

Sinjhoro Tehsil (Sindhi: سنجھورو) is a taluka, an administrative subdivision, of Sanghar District, Sindh, Pakistan. It is nearer to Sanghar than other Tehsils. The people are mainly Sindhi.

Most of the people are involved in agriculture and livestock, the Sindhi people are predominantly involved in cultivation whilst and retail shops in the city.

== Demographics ==
Religions in Sinjhoro Tehsil (2023)
Religion	Percent
Islam	72.40%
Hinduism	27.38%
Other or not stated	0.22%

At the time of the 2023 census, Sinjhoro tehsil had a population of 354,709, of which 59,834 is urban. Sinjhoro had a sex ratio of 103.04 males per 100 females and a literacy rate of 42.02%: 52.14% for males and 31.53% for females.

Languages of Sinjhoro Tehsil (2023)
1. Sindhi (72.3%)
2. Punjabi (7.47%)
3. Urdu (5.12%)
4. Hindko (3.63%)
5. Saraiki (2.43%)
6. Balochi (2.40%)
7. Brahui (2.13%)
8. Others (4.52%)

== Administration ==
The taluka is administratively subdivided into 8 Union Councils, these are:

- U.C 35 Pritamabad
- U.C 36 Kurkali
- U.C 37 Jaffar Khan Leghari
- U.C 38 Jhol
- U.C 39 Sinjhoro
- U.C 40 Shahmardanabad
- U.C 41 Khadro
- U.C 42 Goth Islamabad
