= Khipro Tehsil =

Tehsil in Sindh, Pakistan

Khipro
- City
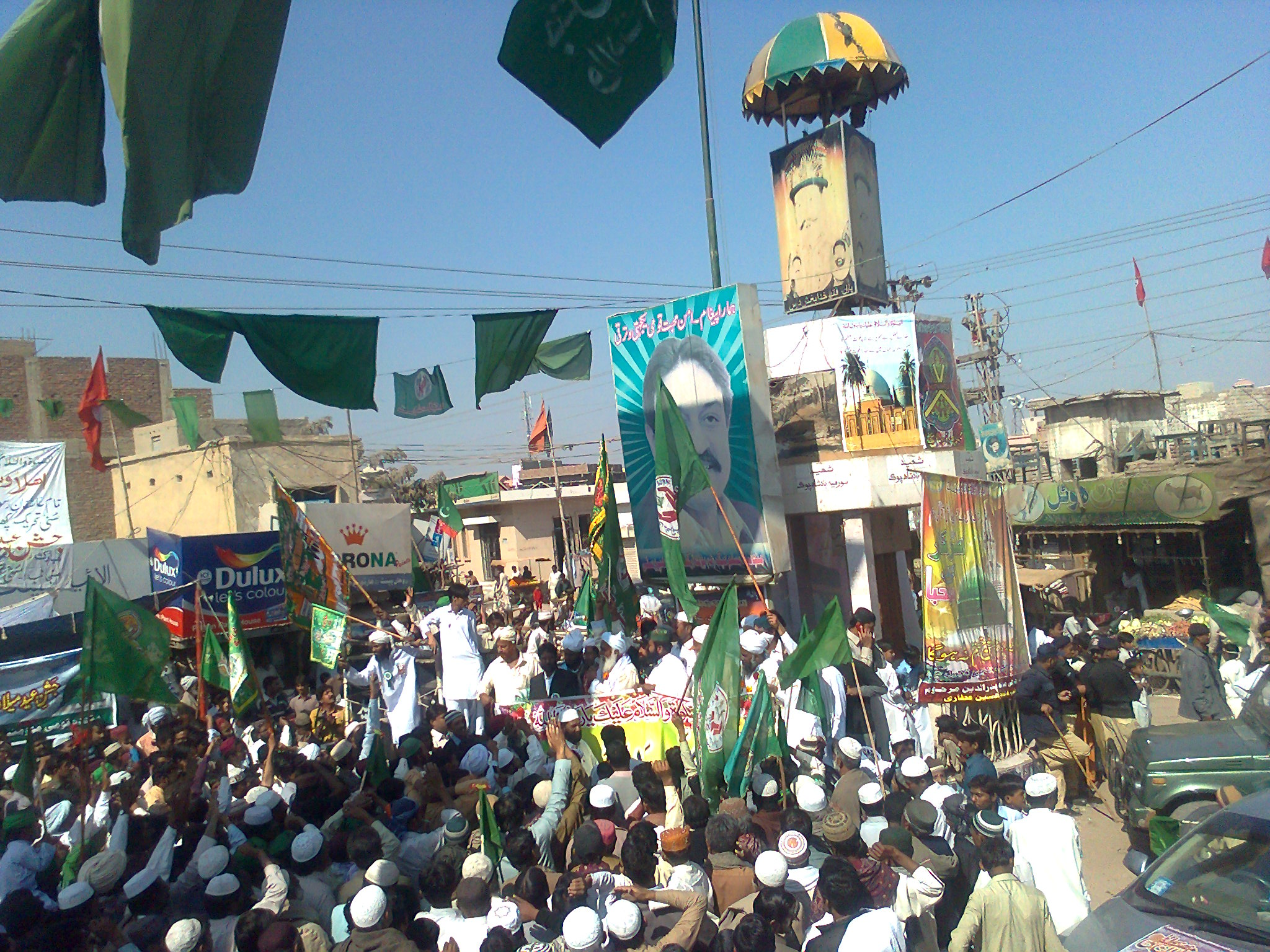
- Milad Shareef rally in Khipro town

- Location within Sindh Location within Pakistan
- Coordinates: 25.823°N 69.377°E
- Country: Pakistan
- Province: Sindh
- District: Sanghar

Area
  - Total: 5,933 km^{2} (2,291 sq mi)
- Elevation: 28 m (92 ft)

Population
  - Total: 332,833
  - Density: 56.10/km^{2} (145.3/sq mi)
- Time zone: UTC+5 (PST)
- Calling code: 235

Khipro (Urdu: کھپرو, Sindhi :کپرو ) is a tehsil of Sanghar District in the Sindh province of Pakistan. Khipro is the tehsil headquarters.

== History ==
No clear reference describes the origin of the word Khipro. as of the word of mouth of population of Khipro City, its one of the historical places in White Thar,

== Transport ==
The nearest airport is Sindhri Tharparkar Airport (IATA: MPD) .

== Geography ==
It consists of 1,300,776 acres (526,405 ha) acres of which 1,109,129 are desert, 11,475 forest and 191,647 agriculture.

== Economy ==
Its primary industry is agriculture. Cotton, Wheat, Sugar cane, and Chilies are major crops.

== Demographics ==
Religions in Khipro tehsil (2017)
Religion	Percent
Islam	62.14%
Hinduism	37.34%
Christianity	0.50%
Other or not stated	0.02%

Khipro tehsil has a population of 332,833 living in 63,642 households. Khipro has a sex ratio of 919 females per 1000 males and a literacy rate of 33.75%: 44.99% for males and 21.53% for females. 15.32% of the population lives in urban areas.

91.39% of the tehsil spoke Sindhi, 4.18% Urdu and 1.08% Punjabi as their first language.

== Culture ==
The city is a mixture of Muslim, Hindu and other communities. In the Muslim community, most of the people belong to Gajju, Samejo, Junejo, Mangrio, Hingorja, Chohan, Rajar, Khaskheli, Kunbhar, Dars, Jatt, Bozdar, Malik, Qaimkhani, Syed, Lohar, Qureshi, Baloch, Laghari, Lashari tribes and in Hindus, most of the people belong to Goswami, Lohana, Khatri, Malhi, Bheel, Kolhi, Guriro, Oad, Sodha, Rajput and other communities.

== See also ==
- Khipro, Pakistan
- List of tehsils of Sindh
