= Sinjhoro =

Town in Sindh, Pakistan

Coordinates: 26°02′N 68°48′E

Sinjhoro (Sindhi: سنجھورو) is a small town of Sanghar District, Sindh, Pakistan, around 12 kilometers to the west of Sanghar city. The Taluka Municipal Administration is based in Sinjhoro, and a Mukhtiarkar has been in charge of handling revenue issues since the times of British colonial rule.

== Transport ==
The Narrow Gauge Railway Line once connected the town to neighbouring cities, but it no longer utilises the railroads. The rich soil is ideal for growing crops. While residents also raise vegetables and flowers, the three primary crops are cotton, sugarcane, and wheat.

== Climate ==
The weather here is very hot and some weeks cool due to the Siberian winds in winter.

== Population ==
The population of the town is 354,709 (as of 2023).
