= Jam Nawaz Ali Taluka =

Jam Nawaz Ali (ڄام نواز علي) is a taluka (sub-district) and a city in Sanghar District, Sindh, Pakistan, about 60 km from Sanghar city. This is the place of residence for the Jam's of Sanghar who ruled the Province of Sindh with Thatta as the Capital. The current Nawab of the Samma and Junejo Tribes in Pakistan is Nawab Jam Zulfiquar Ali Khan. The Nawab Jam Family of Sindh is recognized for its great services. Among prominent Samma’s are the members of Nawab Jam family of Sanghar (which are Junejo by caste): Al Haj Nawab Jam Kambhu Khan, Chief of Samma (title of Nawab, Khan Bahadur, swords of honour), Khan Sahib Jam Mitha Khan (Khan Bahadur, Chief, Sanghar), Nawab Jam Jan Muhammad Khan (Member Legislative Assembly, title of Nawab, Sardar Bahadur, Khan Bahadur, OBE) Son of Jam Sharif Ali Khan Son of Jam Nawaz Ali Khan who was the Nawab of the Samma and Junejo Tribes. Nawab Jam Sadiq Ali Khan (Former Chief Minister of Sindh) was also born in this city. The city is home to several important institutions, including Cadet College Sanghar, the Police Recruit Training Centre, and many government buildings.

== Union Council / Ward No. / Deh ==
1: Jam Nawaz Ali Town Committee, Deh 55 Jamrao, 64 Jamrao , 65 Jamrao , 82 Jamrao, 83 Jamrao, 84 Jamrao, 84-A Jamrao, 86 Jamrao

2: Berani Town Committee, Berani City Wards No. 01, 02, 03, 04, 05, Deh Berani, Bhadar

3: Union Council Nauabad, Deh Hasan Ali, Raj Pari, 48 Jamrao, 49 Jamrao, 50 Jamrao, 51 Jamrao, 22 Dim, 23 Dim 24 Dim

4: Union Council Tilla Shah, Deh 25 Dim, 26 Dim, 52 Jamrao, 53 Jamrao, 54 Jamrao, 66 Jamrao, 67 Jamrao, 68 Jamrao, 69 Jamrao, 70 Jamrao

5: Union Council Hot Wassan, Deh Bobi, Bhiro, 44 Jamrao, 45 Jamrao, 46 Jamrao, 47 Jamrao, 56 Jamrao, 57 Jamrao, 58 Jamrao

6: Union Council Mansura, Deh 42 Jamrao, 43 Jamrao, 59 Jamrao

7: Union Council Jam Jani, Deh Jampur, Darhan, Mari, Mashaikh Hothi

== Demographics ==
The population of Jam Nawaz Ali Taluka, according to 2017 census was 153,342.
