= Tando Adam Khan =

Pakistani town

Tando Adam ٹنڈو آدم
- City
- Location of Tando Adam Tando Adam (Pakistan)
- Coordinates: 25.768°N 68.662°E
- Country: Pakistan
- Province: Sindh
- District: Sanghar
- Became Taluka of Sanghar: 1955

Government
  - Type: Municipal Committee
  - Chairman: Ghulam Murtaza
  - Vice-Chairman: Zulfiqar Ali
  - MNA: Salahuddin Junejo
  - MPA: Paras Dero

Population (2023 census)
  - City: 174,291
  - Rank: 61st in Pakistan
- Postal code(s): 68050
- Telephone code: 0235
- Official language: Sindhi, Urdu

Tando Adam (Urdu: ٹنڈو آدم; Sindhi: ٽنڊو آدم) is a city in Sindh, Pakistan. Formerly part of Nawabshah District (now Shaheed Benazirabad Division) until 1955, it later became a part of Sanghar District. The word "Tando" means "outpost" in Sindhi language and Tando Adam, named after Adam Khan, is now the 61st most populous city in Pakistan. The town is renowned for its industries and agriculture production, with key crops including sugarcane, wheat, cotton, bananas, and mangoes.

According to the 2017 census, it is the most populous city in Sanghar District, with a population of 152,025.

Many new housing scheme are being developed on the outskirts of the city.

== Overview ==
Tando Adam is one of the principal urban centres of Sanghar District in Sindh, Pakistan. Located on the Karachi–Peshawar Railway Line and connected to the National Highway (N-5), the city serves as an important regional centre for commerce, industry, transportation, education, and healthcare. It is widely recognised as one of Pakistan's leading power loom and textile manufacturing centres, while agriculture and trade remain important contributors to the local economy.

The city is situated approximately 18 kilometres (11 mi) from Bhit Shah, home to the shrine of the renowned Sufi poet Shah Abdul Latif Bhittai. Tando Adam also contains several historic mosques and Hindu temples, reflecting its rich cultural and religious heritage. In recent years, the city has expanded with the establishment of new educational institutions, healthcare facilities, residential developments, and recreational attractions, reflecting its growing urban significance within Sanghar District.

== Economic activity ==
Tando Adam is one of the principal economic centres of Sanghar District. The city's economy is primarily driven by the textile, agriculture, manufacturing, trade, and services sectors. It is widely recognised as one of Pakistan's leading power loom centres, with textile weaving and related industries playing a significant role in the local economy.

The industrial sector comprises cotton ginning factories, edible oil extraction and processing units, pharmaceutical manufacturing, flour and rice mills, fruit juice processing plants, paper product industries, and numerous small-scale cottage industries. These industries provide employment to a large workforce from Tando Adam and neighbouring towns and villages.

Agriculture remains an important component of the local economy. Cotton, wheat, sugarcane, and other agricultural produce from the surrounding rural areas are processed and traded through the city's industrial and wholesale network, supporting both regional commerce and agro-based industries.

The city's economy is further supported by the banking, telecommunications, transportation, logistics, healthcare, education, and retail sectors. Industrial and business establishments located along the Shahdadpur Road, Sanghar Road, Hyderabad Road, and other peripheral areas contribute significantly to employment generation and economic growth. Owing to its industrial base and strategic location, Tando Adam serves as an important trading and manufacturing centre within Sanghar District and the wider Hyderabad Division.

== Cuisine ==
Tando Adam is full of bazaars, mosques, shrines and plenty of places to eat. Notable dishes of the city include sajji special dessert barfi (known as "maawa") and lassi of Mastana are specialties known for their unique taste around the country.

== Hospitals ==
Taluka Hospital, Al-Haj Suleman Roshan Hospital, Sanghar Homeopathic Medical Hospital, Mark Hospital, Hira Hospital, Dogar Hospital, Nadeem General Hospital, Shahzad Hospital, Nadeem Medical Centre, Areeb Bone Care Hospital, Awais Clinic, Indus Medical Center & Diagnostic, Al-Shahbaz Medical Center, Al-Rehman Hospital, Chishtia Baby Care Clinic, Mustafa Clinic, Shah Mir Khan Memorial Hospital. Several privately managed hospitals also operate in the city.

== Education ==
Tando Adam is one of the major educational centres of Sanghar District, offering a wide range of public and private educational institutions at the primary, secondary, higher secondary, and college levels.

=== Public Educational Institutions ===
Government New Aligarh Degree College, Government Girls Degree College, Government Sir Syed High School, Government Shah Abdul Latif High School, Government Fatimah Jinnah Girls High School, Government Elementary Schools, Government Boys Primary Schools, Government Girls Primary Schools

=== Private Educational Institutions ===
Suleman Roshan Medical College (SRMC), Sanghar Homeopathic Medical College (SHMC), The City Higher Secondary School, Bahria Foundation School and College, The Educators, The Smart School, The Noble Education System, Progenitor High School, Al-Saeed Islamic Public School, Sir Syed Children Academy High School, Sayara Khanum High School, Zindagi Foundation School, The Spirit School, Allied School, The Knowledge School, Oxford Grammar School, Al-Hira Public School. Several privately managed schools, academies, and educational institutions also operate in the city.

== Commercial Area ==
Tando Adam is one of the principal commercial and industrial centres of Sanghar District. The city's commercial activities are concentrated primarily along Muhammad Ali Jinnah Road (M.A. Jinnah Road), which serves as its main business corridor. The road is lined with wholesale and retail markets, shopping plazas, banks, restaurants, hotels, pharmacies, medical centres, automobile dealerships, workshops, educational institutions, government offices, and a wide range of commercial establishments.

The city's major commercial and transportation hubs include Bab-e-Shahnawaz Junejo, Muhammadi Chowk, Latif Gate, Foji Morr, and the Tando Adam Junction Railway Station area. Muhammadi Chowk is the city's central business intersection and serves as the principal transit point connecting Tando Adam with Hyderabad via the National Highway (N-5), as well as Sanghar, Shahdadpur, Tando Allahyar, and other nearby towns. Latif Gate functions as an important commercial gateway on the Bhit Shah Road, while Foji Morr is a prominent commercial intersection on Tando Allahyar Road, accommodating retail businesses, transport services, fuel stations, and restaurants. The vicinity of Tando Adam Junction Railway Station also supports significant commercial activity due to passenger traffic and freight movement.

Other notable commercial and urban localities include Green City, Lake City, Satellite Town, Hill Top and other developing residential and commercial schemes situated along the Hyderabad Road and Bypass Road. Traditional markets, grain markets (Anaj Mandi), fruit and vegetable markets (Sabzi Mandi), livestock markets (Bakra Mandi and Cattle Market), and the city's textile and power loom markets contribute significantly to the local economy. Tando Adam is recognised as one of Pakistan's largest power loom centres, with textile manufacturing and trading forming a major component of its commercial sector.

The city also contains several public recreational spaces that support nearby commercial activity, including Green City Water Park, Gulshan-e-Siddique Park, Rashid Manhas Public Park Baloch Colony, Public Park Khuzdar Colony, Mehmood Khan Park, Bozdar Society Public Park, and Railway Ground. These attractions, together with the surrounding commercial districts, serve residents and visitors from across the region.

== Demographics ==
Population

Historical population

Year	Pop.	±% p.a.
1951	21,260	—
1961	31,246	+3.93%
1972	49,747	+4.32%
1981	62,744	+2.61%

Year	Pop.	±% p.a.
1998	104,907	+3.07%
2017	152,617	+1.99%
2023	174,291	+2.24%

According to 2023 census, Tando Adam Khan had a population of 174,291. According to the population of Tando Adam Khan is 152,617. In 1951, there were only 21,260 residents; by 2012, the population had increased to 223,261. The area of the city is 16 square kilometres (6.2 sq mi) it means Tando Adam Protruding Total 3,954 acre.

Religions

Religions in Tando Adam (2023)
Religion	Percent
Islam	93.98%
Hinduism	5.38%
Christianity	0.62%
Other or not stated	0.02%

The population of Muslims is 93% Muslim, 6% Hindu, and 1% Christian.

=== Language ===
Languages of Tando Adam taluka (2023 Census)
1. Sindhi (60.8%)
2. Urdu (18.6%)
3. Punjabi (8.80%)
4. Balochi (3.40%)
5. Pashto (1.00%)
6. Others (7.40%)

Sindhi, Urdu and Punjabi are the most spoken languages in Tando adam khan according to 2023 Pakistani census.
