= Sanghar Tehsil =

Coordinates: 26°02′47″N 68°56′53″E

Sanghar Taluka تعلقہ سانگھڑ سانگهڙ ضلعو
- Taluka (Tehsil)
- Interactive map of Sanghar Taluka
- Country: Pakistan
- Province: Sindh
- District: Sanghar District
- Time zone: UTC+5 (PST)

Sanghar Taluka is an administrative subdivision (tehsil) of Sanghar District in the Sindh province of Pakistan, the city of Sanghar is the district headquarter of district Sanghar.

== History ==
During British rule, the taluka of Sanghar was part of the Thar and Parkar district of Sindh (initially part of the Bombay Presidency). In 1901 the taluka covered an area of 1,050 square miles (2,700 km^{2}), however the taluka was subdivided shortly afterwards and then contained an area of 830 square miles.

The population according to the 1901 census was 40,341 this was a decrease of about a thousand since the 1891 census (41,265). The 1901 census also revealed a density of 49 people per square miles which was considerably higher than the district average. The land revenues and cessess in 1903-4 amounted to 130,000, the taluka was chiefly irrigated by the Mithrao Canal and rice was the principle crop.
