= Shahdadpur =

Shahdadpur شہداد پور
- City
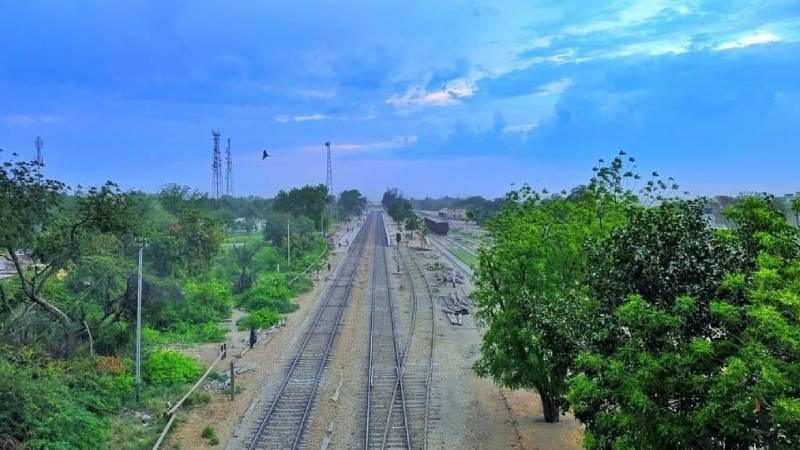
- Railway Station Shahdadpur

- Location within Sindh Location within Pakistan Location within South Asia
- Coordinates: 25°55′22″N 68°37′14″E
- Country: Pakistan
- Province: Sindh
- District: Sanghar

Government
  - Type: Municipal Committee
  - Chairman: Ali Murtaza Rehman
  - Vice Chairman: Muhammad Luqman

Population (2023 census)
  - City: 113,342
  - Rank: 112th in Pakistan
- Postal code(s): 68030
- Telephone code: 0235
- Official language: Sindhi, Urdu
- Website: www.shahdadpur.ga

Shahdadpur (Sindhi: شهدادپور) is a city, located in Shahdadpur Taluka, Sanghar District, Sindh, Pakistan.

== Economic Activities ==
The economy of Shahdadpur is primarily based on agriculture, supported by irrigation from canals such as the Mithrao and Nara systems in the Indus River basin. Major crops include cotton, wheat, rice, sugarcane, and various fruits. The city hosts small-scale industries, particularly cotton ginning factories and flour mills, as part of Sanghar District's agro-processing sector, which serves as a major cotton hub with numerous ginning units. It serves as a local commercial hub, with trade centered on exporting agricultural produce to larger markets, alongside retail activities in bazaars such as Shahi Bazaar. Employment in market sales, agro-processing, and related services contributes notably to the urban workforce in Sanghar District.

== Demographics ==
=== Population ===
Historical population
Year	Pop.	±% p.a.
1951	15,314	—
1961	21,537	+3.47%
1972	29,180	+2.80%
1981	42,107	+4.16%
1998	62,655	+2.37%
2017	99,653	+2.47%
2023	113,342	+2.17%

According to the 2023 census, Shahdadpur had a population of 113,342.

Languages

Languages of Shahdadpur (2023 Census)
1. Sindhi (44.8%)
2. Urdu (40.8%)
3. Punjabi (5.80%)
4. Balochi (1.70%)
5. Saraiki (1.70%)
6. Others (5.20%)

== See also ==
- Sanghar District
- Sindh
