= Sanghar =

City in Sindh, Pakistan

Sanghar سانگھڑ
- City
- Location within Sindh Location within Pakistan
- Coordinates: 26°2′39″N 68°57′13″E
- Country: Pakistan
- Province: Sindh
- Division: Shaheed Benazir Abad

Government
  - MPA Deputy commissioner Mayor SHO: Ghulam Dastagir Rajar Imran-ul-Hassan Khuwaja Ali Hasan Hingorjo Gulazar Ahmed Mari

Population (2023)
  - Total: 74,112
- Time zone: UTC+5 (PST)
- Calling code: 0235

Sanghar (Sindhi: سانگھڙ; Urdu: سانگھڑ English: Sānghar) is a city in Sanghar District, Sindh, Pakistan. Sanghar is the headquarters of Sanghar District and Sanghar Taluka (a subdivision of the district). The driving distance of Sangher from Karachi is 267 kilometers (166 miles). It has road links with Hyderabad, Nawabshah, Mirpur Khas, Khairpur, Sukkur, Karachi and other major cities of Sindh.

The surrounding area consists chiefly of semiarid land, a part of the great Thar Desert, and some cropped areas irrigated by the Mithrao Canal system, which feeds from the Indus River. It is located in an agricultural area where rice, wheat, and cotton are mainly grown, but it is also home to several cotton-textile factories and is a local market town.

The population of the city is 74,112 (2023). This is the third most populous city of Sanghar district after Tando Adam and Shahdadpur.

It is not known when Sanghar was founded. However, it was a small village with a population of few hundred. It is generally believed that Sanghar was named after a pious fisherwoman Mai Sanghar. During the British rule in India, the population of this village increased and it grew in a small town. When Sindh was separated from the Bombay Presidency in 1935, Sanghar earned the title of Taluka. In 1954 it was given the status of District Headquarter.

== Demographics ==
Population

Historical population
Year	Pop.	±%
1972	19,739	—
1981	29,239	+48.1%
1998	50,696	+73.4%
2017	75,209	+48.4%
2023	74,112	−1.5%

According to 2023 census, Sanghar city had a population of 74,112.

Languages

Languages of Sanghar city (2023 Census)
1. Sindhi (44.0%)
2. Urdu (23.1%)
3. Punjabi (19.0%)
4. Saraiki (4.00%)
5. Pashto (2.40%)
6. Balochi (2.10%)
7. Others (5.40%)

== Educational institutions ==
- Shaheed Benazir Bhutto University Shaheed Benazirabad (Sanghar Campus), a public sector institute offering Bachelors in Business Administration, English and Information Technology (4 years programs)
- Bahria Foundation College, Sanghar (a private sector institute offering studies up to Intermediate Science from Nursery level)
- Fauji Foundation School, Sanghar (military - private sector institute offering studies up to Matriculation from Nursery level)
- OPF Schools Sanghar Campus (a private sector institute offering studies up to Matriculation from Nursery level)
