= Sanghar District =

Coordinates: 26°00′N 69°15′E

Sanghar District ضلعو سانگهڙ ضلع سانگھڑ
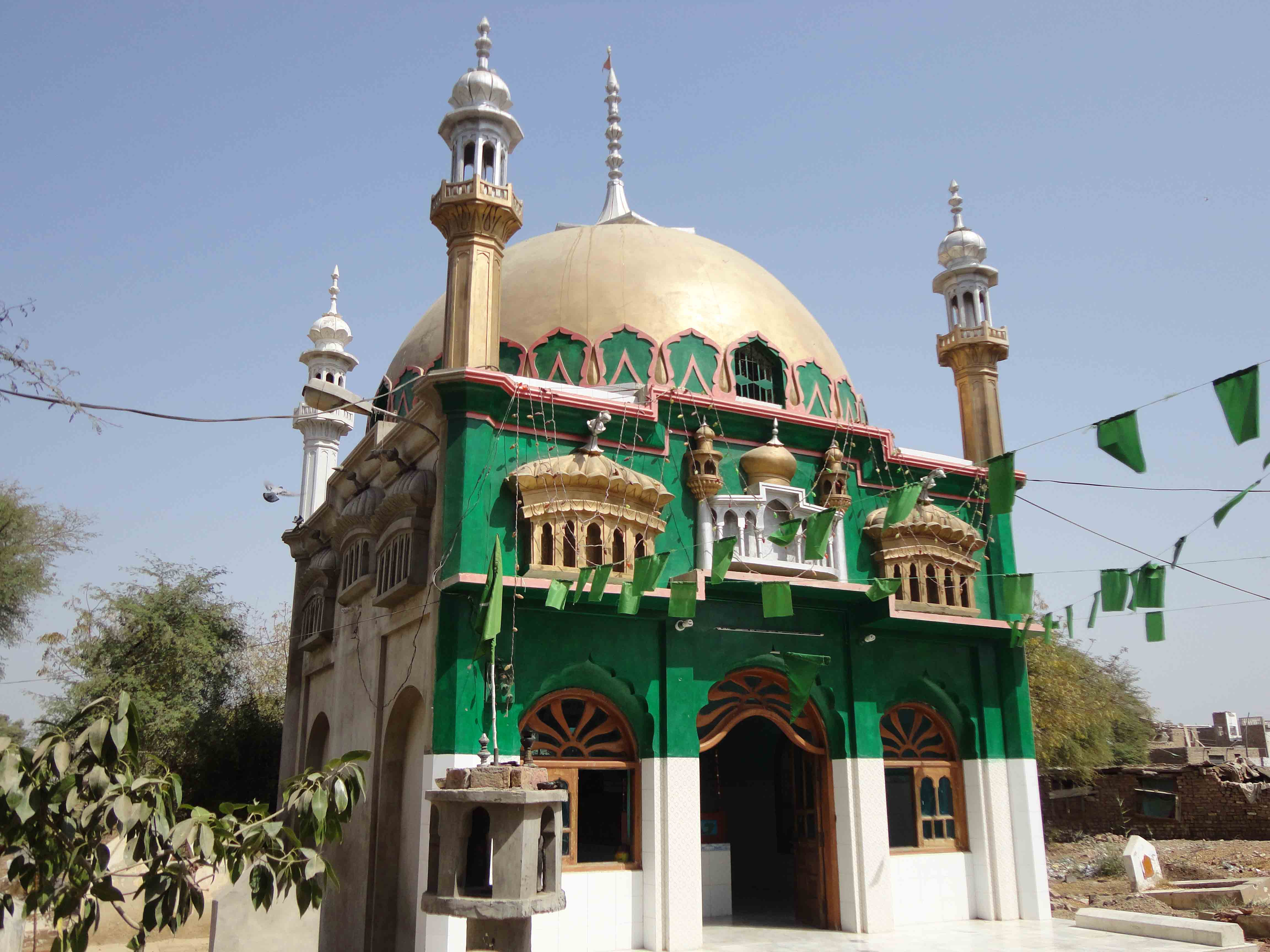
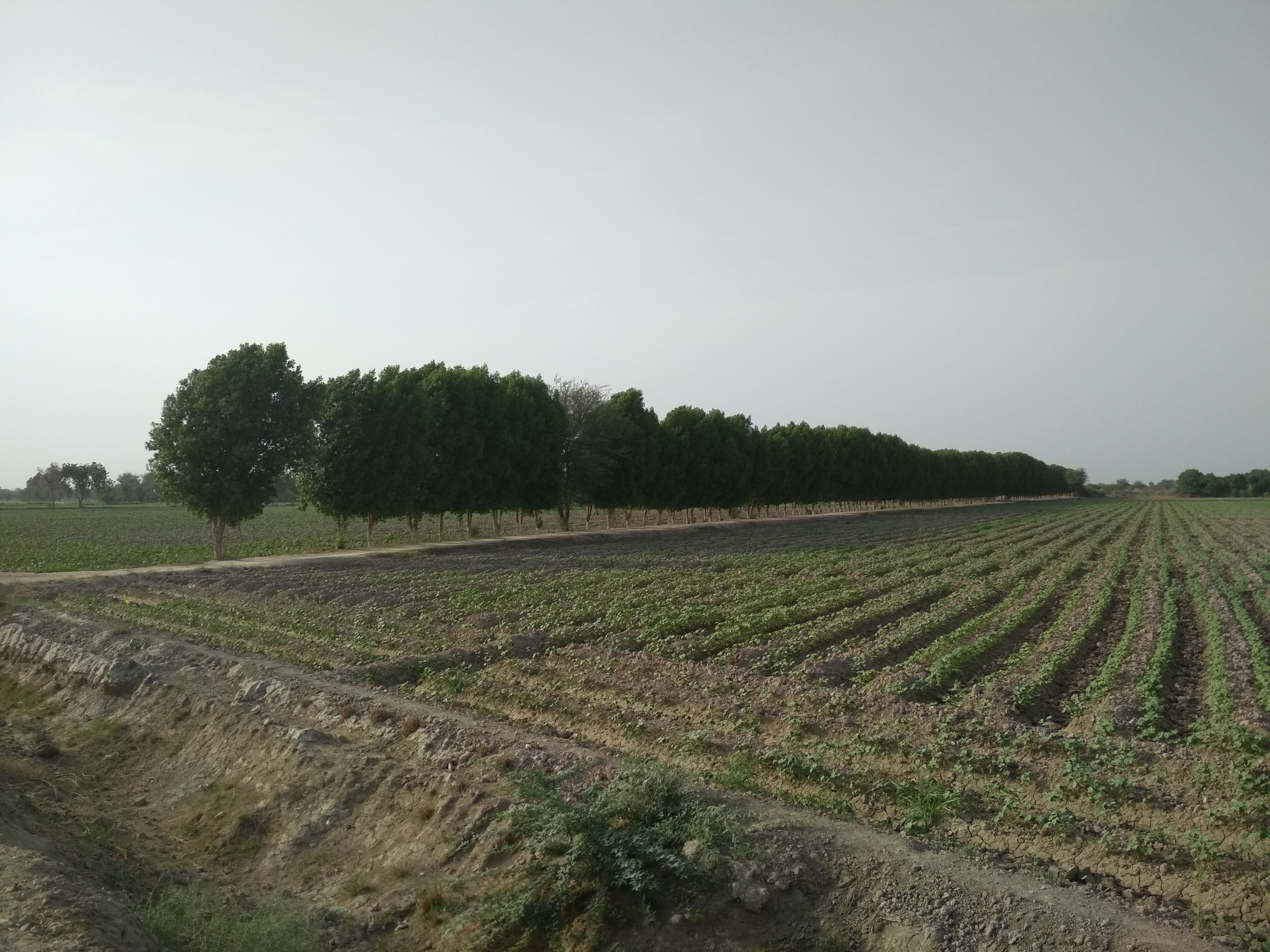
- Top: Mosque at Shahdadpur; Bottom: Fields near Sirhinwari

- Sanghar is located in the centre of Sindh.
- Country: Pakistan
- Province: Sindh
- Division: Shaheed Benazir Abad
- Seat: Sanghar

Government
  - Type: District Administration
  - MNA Sanghar: khudadad Brohi

Area
  - City: 10,728 km^{2} (4,142 sq mi)

Population (2023)
  - City: 2,308,465
  - Density: 215.18/km^{2} (557.32/sq mi)
  - Urban: 630,782 (27.32%)
  - Rural: 1,677,683 (72.68%)

Literacy
  - Literacy rate: Total: 43.66%; Male: 53.11%; Female: 33.85%
- Time zone: UTC+5 (PST)
- Number of Tehsils: 6 Khipro, Jam Nawaz Ali, Tando Adam, Sinjhoro, Shahdadpur, Sanghar.

Sanghar District (Sindhi: ضلعو سانگھڙ, Urdu: ضلع سانگھڑ) is one of the largest districts of Sindh province, Pakistan. This district lies between 25^{0}58^{'}13 N latitudes and 69^{0}24^{'}4E longitudes. It was a village before Mallah tribe were settled there. It has an area of 9874 square kilometres. It is located in the centre of Sindh and is bounded to the east by India. The district capital, Sanghar, is itself a small city roughly 35 miles (56 km) east-south-east of the city of Nawabshah and the same distance north of Mirpur Khas. Its primary industry is agriculture.

Largest tribe of Sanghar district is Mallah who has the population of almost 350000 people. Other tribes are: Bheel, Marri, Meghwar, Oad, Kolhi, Jakhro, Jam, Rajput, Jat, Hingora, Wassan, Mirani, Mirbahar, Dhareja, Unar, Siyal, Nizamani, Chandio, Rind, Leghari, Arain, Muhajir, Nareja, Bugti, Sanjrani.

The following cities are located in Sanghar District: Sanghar, Tando Adam, Jam Nawaz Ali, Shahdadpur, Shahpur Chakar, Sinjhoro, Jhol, and Sarhari among others.

Sanghar District is also known as the district of Hur Mujhaids, who are followers of Muslim saint Syed Shah Mardan Shah-II. They also fought against British government under the command of Sibghatullah Shah Rashidi.

== Administrative subdivisions ==
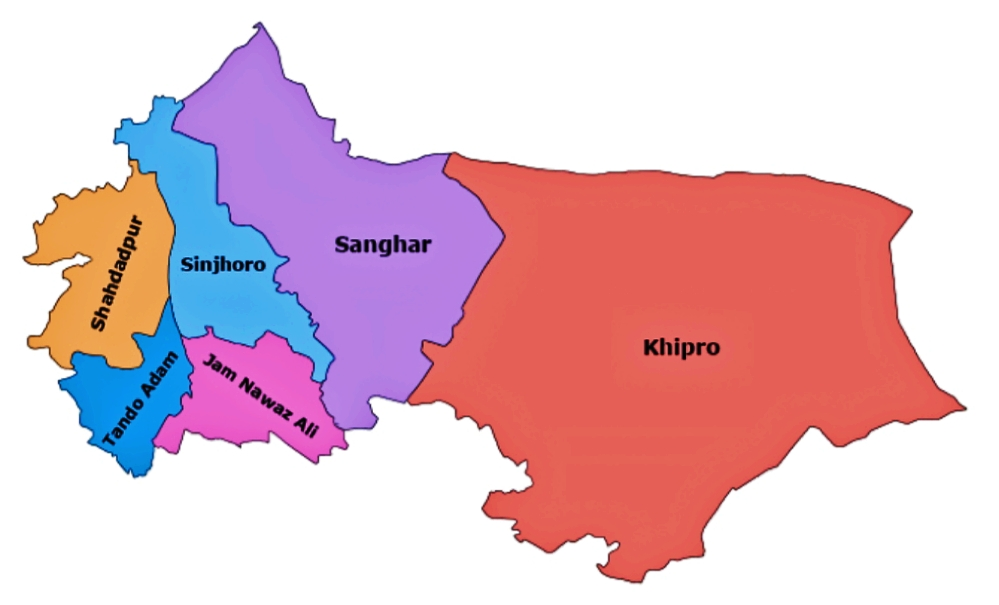
Tehsils of Sanghar district

The district of Sanghar is administratively subdivided into 6 tehsils:

- Jam Nawaz Ali Tehsil
- Khipro Tehsil
- Sanghar Tehsil
- Shahdadpur Tehsil
- Sinjhoro Tehsil
- Tando Adam Khan Tehsil

District Council Sanghar has 70 Union councils, 4 Municipal Committees and 11 Town Committees.

== History ==
The town of Sanghar, the district headquarters, was formerly a small village that has been populated since the 18th century. It was named after a pious fisher-woman, Mai Singhar but there is no evidence about entity of such woman, whereas, as per Dr nabi bux its name came from saang means overflow of water; for more than a century, it remained a small village with a population of a few hundred.

After the 1853 invasion by Charles Napier, Sindh was divided into provinces and was assigned zamindars, also known as "Wadera", to collect taxes for the British. Sindh was later made part of British India's Bombay Presidency, and became a separate province in 1935. During this period Sanghar obtained the status of Taluka, a subdivision, and was alternatively included in districts of Nawabshah and Tharparkar. In 1954 it was given the status of District-Headquarters.

The people of the district, specifically the Hurs, played a vital role in independence of Pakistan. The Hurs were an organized military resistance group led by Pir Syed Sabghatullah Shah Pagaro Shaheed, popularly known as Pir Pagara, which sought independence from the British Raj. They fought a guerrilla warfare campaign against the British military, and were always a thorn in the side of British Raj. It has been said that this warfare was one of the major nails in the coffin of British Raj in India.

According to legend, the bodies of Sohni Mahiwal, the titular heroes of one of the four popular tragic romances of Sindh, were recovered from the Indus River near Shahdadpur city and are buried there. The Tomb of Sohni is situated in Shahdadpur, which is 40 kilometres (25 mi) from Sanghar and 75 kilometres (47 mi) from Hyderabad.

=== Places ===
- Mir Shahdad Jo Qubo, the tomb of Mir Shahdad Talpur, who is regarded as one of the finest military commanders of Sindh, is one of the historical heritages of Sindh and is located in Shahpur Chakar, at a graveyard of the family members of Mir Shahdad Talpur. Shahdadpur, a big city of Sindh Province, is named after Mir Shahdad Talpur, while Shahpur Chakar is named behind his son Mir Chakar Talpur.
- Mansura, ruins from the seventh century A.D. This site has been excavated by the government of Pakistan, and where the local folks go Gold-jewelry hunting after heavy rains. The rains wash off the top soil thereby exposing, among other artifacts, the ancient jewelry.

== Demographics ==
Historical population
Year	Pop.	±% p.a.
1951	311,553	—
1961	417,440	+2.97%
1972	674,210	+4.45%
1981	893,047	+3.17%
1998	1,421,977	+2.77%
2017	2,049,873	+1.94%
2023	2,308,465	+2.00%

As of the 2023 census, Sanghar district has 406,937 households and a population of 2,308,465. The district has a sex ratio of 103.25 males to 100 females and a literacy rate of 43.66%: 53.11% for males and 33.85% for females. 734,122 (31.81% of the surveyed population) are under 10 years of age. 630,782 (27.32%) live in urban areas.

=== Religion ===
Religions in Sanghar district (2023)
Religion	Percent
Islam	74.95%
Hinduism	24.47%
Christianity	0.42%
Other or not stated	0.16%

Religion in contemporary Sanghar District
Religious group	1941		2017		2023	
Religious group	Pop.	%	Pop.	%	Pop.	%
Islam	161,102	61.75%	1,594,744	77.80%	1,729,751	74.95%
Hinduism	96,109	36.84%	446,737	21.79%	564,648	24.47%
Sikhism	1,808	0.69%	—N/a	—N/a	88	~0%
Tribal	1,319	0.51%	—N/a	—N/a	—N/a	—N/a
Christianity	536	0.21%	7,578	0.37%	9,677	0.42%
Others (Note: Including Jainism, Christianity, Buddhism, Zoroastrianism, Judaism, Ad-Dharmis, or not stated)	3	~0%	814	0.04%	3,667	0.16%
Total Population	260,877	100%	2,049,873	100%	2,307,831	100%
Note: 1941 census data is for Shahdadpur and Sinjhoro taluks of Nawabshah District and Sanghar and part of Khipro taluks of Tharparkar District, which roughly corresponds to contemporary Sanghar District. the ratio of population of Khipro district which became part of Sindhri taluka was determined from 1951-1998 census data.

The majority religion is Islam, with 74.95% of the population. Hinduism (including those from Scheduled Castes) is 24.47% of the population.

=== Language ===
Languages of Sanghar district (2023)
1. Sindhi (76.1%)
2. Urdu (8.69%)
3. Punjabi (5.38%)
4. Balochi (2.05%)
5. Hindko (1.57%)
6. Saraiki (1.43%)
7. Brahui (1.41%)
8. Others (3.33%)

At the time of the 2023 census, 76.13% of the population spoke Sindhi, 8.69% Urdu, 5.38% Punjabi, 2.05% Balochi, 1.57% Hindko, 1.22% Saraiki, 1.19% Brahui and 0.94% Pashto as their first language.

=== Town & municipalities ===
Tando Adam is the most populous city of the district. The total area of the district is 10,728 km^{2}. The population of other major cities and towns is presented in the following Table.

Cities and Towns of Sangher
	Name	Status	Census 1972	Census 1981	Census 1998	Census 2017
1	Tando Adam	Municipal Council	42,107	62,744	104,907	152,025
2	Shahdadpur	Municipal Council	29,180	42,107	62,655	99,667
3	Sangher	Municipal Council	19,739	29,239	50,696	75,209
4	Khipro	Town Council	8,224	14,200	25,580	50,996
5	Jatia	Town Council	....	....	.....	39,777
6	Shahpur Chakar	Town Council	6,798	12,544	18,361	33,941
7	Jhol	Town Council	5,126	7,382	13,738	21,792
8	Sinjhoro	Municipal Council	7,662	8,616	14,055	19,682
9	Berani	Town Council	....	7,121	8,352	18,788
10	Sarhari	Town Council	....	6,261	9,571	17,698
11	Khadro	Town Council	5,110	6,011	8,624	15,448
12	Kandiari	Town Council	....	....	5,161	9,714
13	Jam Nawaz Ali	Town Council	....	....	4,452	8,420
14	Tando Mitha Khan	Town Council	....	....	2,309	5,236
15	Piru Mal	Town Council	....	1,468	2,155	3,326

== List of dehs ==
The following is a list of Sanghar District's dehs, organised by taluka:

- Sanghar Taluka (70 dehs)
  - Ait Par
  - Akanwari
  - Awadh
  - Bachna
  - Bahram Bari
  - Bakhoro
  - Bao Khan
  - Baqar
  - Bassi
  - Bobi
  - Chah Kabir
  - Chamaro
  - Chotiaryon
  - Dabhri
  - Dareri
  - Darero
  - Daro Bazaar
  - Dhilyar
  - Dhoro Janib
  - Dighal
  - Dilshad Dario
  - Dim
  - Dodan Ja Kanda
  - Dubi
  - Gharo
  - Goth Islamabad
  - Hamzi Ji Khad
  - Harathri
  - Jakhro
  - Jhun
  - Kalar
  - Kandiari
  - Kehor
  - Khadwri
  - Khakharo
  - Kundho
  - Lib
  - Loharro
  - Lutko
  - Makhi
  - Mano Khan Chandio
  - Mihroo
  - Mohammad Ali Wah
  - Photo Dhoro
  - Pir Kehor
  - Rachar
  - Raj Wah
  - Rar
  - Rip
  - Rohero
  - Sadhano
  - Sadrat
  - Sahar Pir
  - Samathri
  - Samoor
  - Sanghar
  - Sanharo
  - Santore
  - Sareji
  - Sethar Pir
  - Sim Janido
  - Sinhori
  - Siran Wari
  - Tando Mitha Khan
  - Thar Sareji
  - Thar Siran Wari
  - Togacho
  - Toori
  - Waghyoon
  - Yaro Hingoro
- Jam Nawaz Ali Taluka (51 dehs)
  - Berani
  - Nauabad
  - Mansoora
  - Tilla Shah
  - Darhan
  - Mari
  - 22 Dim
  - 23 Dim
  - 24 Dim
  - 25 Dim
  - 26 Dim
  - 42 Jamrao
  - 43 Jamrao
  - 44 Jamrao
  - 45 Jamrao
  - 46 Jamrao
  - 47 Jamrao
  - 48 Jamrao
  - 49 Jamrao
  - 50 Jamrao
  - 51 Jamrao
  - 52 Jamrao
  - 53 Jamrao
  - 54 Jamrao
  - 55 Jamrao
  - 56 Jamrao
  - 57 Jamrao
  - 58 Jamrao
  - 59 Jamrao
  - 60 Jamrao
  - 61 Jamrao
  - 62 Jamrao
  - 63 Jamrao
  - 64 Jamrao
  - 65 Jamrao
  - 66 Jamrao
  - 67 Jamrao
  - 68 Jamrao
  - 69 Jamrao
  - 70 Jamrao
  - 82 Jamrao
  - 83 Jamrao
  - 84 Jamrao
  - 84-A Jamrao
  - 85 Jamrao
  - 86 Jamrao
  - Bhadar
  - Bhiro
  - Hasan Ali
  - Hot Wassan
  - Jam Jani
  - Jampur
  - Mashaikh Odho
  - Raj Pari
- Khipro Taluka (78 dehs)
  - Amli
  - Bakherji
  - Bantheri
  - Bawarli
  - Bawarlo
  - Bhatyani
  - Bhit Bhaiti
  - Bhopi
  - Boreji
  - Chanesari
  - Chounro
  - Dakhna
  - Dar
  - Dhadh Liari
  - Dhadhro
  - Dhilyar A. Hadi
  - Dhilyar Rukan
  - Ding
  - Dugo
  - Ellachi
  - Ghandelan
  - Girhar
  - Gorilo
  - Halaro
  - Hathungo
  - Jiao
  - Juman
  - Kadh
  - Kadh Kandiari
  - Kamaro
  - Manchhari
  - Kangani
  - Kaniro
  - Kathoro
  - Keti
  - Khahi
  - Khajni
  - Khambharo
  - Khani Rajar
  - Kheerhadi
  - Khipro
  - Khori
  - Khorilo
  - Khorlio
  - Kirayari
  - Koorthari
  - Kunri
  - Lakhisar
  - Loon Khan
  - Manhoori
  - Marvi
  - Mathoon
  - Moorhadi
  - Moorkadh
  - Nehar
  - Nian
  - Ona Thada
  - Pabban
  - Paneri
  - Pehalwano
  - Pharanhadi
  - Rahundro
  - Ranahu
  - Ranak Dehar
  - Rar
  - Rebhan
  - Roonjho
  - Samarjo
  - Samnhar
  - Sandh
  - Senhoji
  - Sigh
  - Singhar
  - Tarachho
  - Tharahadi
  - Wadhal
  - Waniyani
  - Warhiyan
- Sinjhoro Taluka (94 dehs)
  - Sinjhoro
  - 01 Dim
  - 02 Dim
  - 3 Dim
  - 4 Dim
  - 5 Dim
  - 6 A Dim
  - 6 B Dim
  - 07 Dim
  - 8 Dim
  - 9 Dim
  - 10 Dim
  - 11 Dim
  - 12 Dim
  - 13 Dim
  - 14 Dim
  - 15 Dim
  - 16 Dim
  - 17 Dim
  - 18 Dim
  - 19 Dim
  - 20 Dim
  - 21 Dim
  - 22 Hingora
  - 1 Jamrao
  - 2 Jamrao
  - 3 Jamrao
  - 4 Jamrao
  - 5 Jamrao
  - 6 Jamrao
  - 7 Jamrao
  - 8 Jamrao
  - 9 Jamrao
  - 10 Jamrao
  - 11 Jamrao
  - 12 Jamrao
  - 13 A Jamrao
  - 13 Jamrao
  - 14 Jamrao
  - 15 Jamrao
  - 16 Jamrao
  - 17 Jamrao
  - 18 Jamrao
  - 19 Jamrao
  - 20 Jamrao
  - 21 Jamrao
  - 22 A Jamrao
  - 22 Jamrao
  - 23 Jamrao
  - 24 Jamrao
  - 25 Jamrao
  - 26 Jamrao
  - 27 Jamrao
  - 28 Jamrao
  - 29 Jamrao
  - 30 Jamrao
  - 31 Jamrao
  - 32 Jamrao
  - 33 Jamrao
  - 34 Jamrao
  - 35 Jamrao
  - 36 Jamrao
  - 37 Jamrao
  - 38 Jamrao
  - 39 Jamrao
  - 40 A Jamrao
  - 40 Jamrao
  - 41 Jamrao
  - Bitoor
  - Bothro
  - Dham Rakhi
  - Doofan
  - Duthro
  - Gujherao
  - Jarari
  - Jhol
  - Kari Charo
  - Kehro Rayati
  - Kharho Jagir
  - Kharo Jagir
  - Kot Bijar
  - Kunro
  - Kunro
  - Lakha
  - Liari Jagir
  - Liari Rayati
  - Mathelo
  - Muthalo Jagir
  - Sarki Kandi
  - Shafi Mohammad
  - Thahim
  - Ubhpur Jagir
  - Ubhpur Rayati
- Tando Adam Taluka (28 dehs)
  - Ahdi Junejo
  - Banbhna
  - Belharo
  - Bhit Dhano
  - Bhobhar
  - Burlra
  - Dadi
  - Darar
  - Dhamoi
  - Dukand
  - Durmah
  - Gujhro
  - Guller
  - Hurbari
  - Junejani
  - Kangpati
  - Kumb Daroon
  - Lohano
  - Mangino
  - Manik Thahim
  - Marani
  - Pai
  - Qurlaqqdeer
  - Sulkandar
  - Sutiari
  - Wadadani
- Shahdadpur Taluka (55 dehs)
  - Ahmedabad
  - Barachari Jageer
  - Barachri Rayati
  - Barandi
  - Barhoon
  - Barhoon Jageer
  - Batri
  - Bero Zardari
  - Bhaji
  - Bherwari
  - Chamro
  - Chhimbh
  - Dabhro
  - Deh Dhabro Jageer
  - Gango
  - Gul Mohammad Laghari
  - Haji Age Dino
  - Hamzo Bagrani
  - Jama Jageer
  - Jamma Rayati
  - Kandi
  - Karamullah Dahri Rayati
  - Karamullah Jageer
  - Kullan
  - Liski
  - Lundo
  - Maldasi
  - Maldasi Jageer
  - Mano Jamali
  - Maqsoodo Rind
  - Mian Ji Masjid
  - Mian-jin-masjid Jageer
  - Mira Chhan
  - Mojwa
  - Mova Chhora
  - Murad Ali Rind
  - Paboro
  - Pano Laghari
  - Qubba Shahdad
  - Quboyagan
  - Ranjho Bagrani
  - Runo
  - Saeed Khan
  - Sahitta
  - Sarhari
  - Sarohri
  - Shahdadpur
  - Shahpur Chakar
  - Shehli Nizamani
  - Shuja Jakhro
  - Sumair
  - Topan Dahri
  - Wazir Rind
  - Wazir Rind Jageer
  - Yaro Dahri

== See also ==
- Mansura, Sindh
- Khipro
- Jheol
- Sohni Mahiwal Tomb of Sohni in Shahdadpur.
- Sanghar City
- Khadro Town.

== Bibliography ==
- 1998 District census report of Sanghar. Census publication. Vol. 75. Islamabad: Population Census Organization, Statistics Division, Government of Pakistan. 2000.
