= Badin Express =

Pakistani train

Overview
- Service type: Inter-city rail
- First service: 1962
- Current operator: Pakistan Railways

Route
- Termini: Hyderabad Junction; Badin
- Distance travelled: 104 kilometres (65 mi)
- Average journey time: 2 hours, 30 minutes
- Service frequency: Daily
- Train numbers: 179UP (Hyderabad→Badin); 180DN (Badin→Hyderabad)

On-board services
- Class: Economy
- Sleeping arrangements: Not Available
- Catering facilities: Not Available

Technical
- Track gauge: 1,676 mm (5 ft 6 in)
- Track owner: Pakistan Railways

Badin Express (Urdu: بدین ایکسپریس, Sindhi: بدین ایکسپریس) is a passenger train operated daily by Pakistan Railways between Hyderabad and Badin. The trip takes approximately 2 hours and 30 minutes to cover a published distance of 104 kilometres (65 mi), traveling along the entire stretch of the Hyderabad–Badin Branch Line.

== Route ==
- Hyderabad Junction–Badin via Hyderabad–Badin Branch Line

== Station stops ==
- Hyderabad Junction
- Zeal Pak
- Kathar
- Tando Muhammad
- Matli
- Palh
- Talhar
- Badin

== Equipment ==
Badin Express only offers economy class seating.
