= Hyderabad–Khokhrapar Branch Line =

Railway line in Pakistan

Overview
- Native name: حیدرآباد - کھوکھراپار فرعی ریلوے خط حيدرآباد ـ کوکراپار ريلوي لائين
- Owner: Pakistan Railways
- Termini: Kotri Junction; Zero Point
- Stations: 24

Service
- Operator: Pakistan Railways

Technical
- Line length: 211 km (131 mi)
- Track gauge: 1,676 mm (5 ft 6 in)
- Operating speed: 75 km/h (47 mph)

Hyderabad–Khokhrapar Branch Line (Urdu: حیدرآباد - کھوکھراپار فرعی ریلوے خط, Sindhi: حيدرآباد - کوکراپار ريلوي لائين) is one of several branch lines in Pakistan, operated and maintained by Pakistan Railways. The line begins from Hyderabad Junction station and ends at Zero Point station. Currently, the line is active till Khokhropar The total length of this railway line is 211 kilometers (131 mi). There are 26 railway stations from Kotri Junction to Zero Point.

== History ==
The Hyderabad–Khokhrapar Branch Line was originally built as part of the Hyderabad–Jodhpur Railway in 1892. The first section from Hyderabad to Shadipalli opened in 1892 and was originally constructed as a 1,676 mm (5 ft 6 in) broad gauge railway line (this first section was also known as the Hyderabad–Umarkot Railway). In 1901, the first section was converted to 1,000 mm (3 ft 3 3/8 in) metre gauge where it joined the second section between Shadipalli and Luni and on wards to Jodhpur. In February 2006, the entire Hyderabad–Khokhrapar line was re-converted again back to the original to 1676 mm broad gauge line.

== Stations ==
The stations on this line are as follows:

- Hyderabad Junction
- Mirani (Abandoned)
- Rahuki (Abandoned)
- Tando Jam
- Tando Jam College Halt (Abandoned)
- Tajpur Nasarpur Road
- Rashidabad
- Tando Allahyar
- Kamaro Sharif (Abandoned)
- Sultanabad
- Sultanabad Colony Halt (Abandoned)
- Ratanabad (Abandoned)
- Mirpur Khas
- Mirpur Khas Goods (Abandoned)
- Sugar Mill Halt (Abandoned)
- Jamrao Junction
- Balochabad
- Abdullahabad Halt
- Shadipalli
- Saindad Halt
- Pithoro Junction
- Faqir Turko Mangrio (Abandoned)
- Dhoro Naro
- Sadhar Halt
- Hasisar
- Sumrasar Halt
- Chhor
- New Chhor
- Parche-Ji-Veri
- Jalo Jo Chaounro
- Vasar Bah
- Hatala Halt
- Khokhrapar
- Marvi (Abandoned)

== See also ==
- Karachi–Peshawar Railway Line
- Railway lines in Pakistan
