= Hyderabad–Badin Branch Line =

Railway line in Pakistan

Hyderabad-Badin Branch Line حیدرآباد - بدین فرعی ریلوے خط حيدرآباد بدين ريلوي لائين

Overview
- Status: Abandoned
- Owner: Pakistan Railways
- Termini: Hyderabad Junction; Badin
- Stations: 9

Service
- Operator(s): Pakistan Railways

Technical
- Line length: 109 km (68 mi)
- Track gauge: 1,676 mm (5 ft 6 in)

Hyderabad–Badin Branch Line (Urdu: حیدرآباد - بدین فرعی ریلوے خط, Sindhi: حیدرآباد - بدین ريلوي لائن) was one of several branch lines in Pakistan, operated and maintained by Pakistan Railways.This railway line was made abandoned by Pakistan Railways in 2020. The line began from Hyderabad Junction station and ends at Badin station. The total length of this railway line was 109 kilometers (68 mi). There were 9 railway stations from Hyderabad Junction to Badin.

== History ==
The Hyderabad–Badin Railway opened on 15 August 1904 as part of the North Western State Railway's expansion program. However owing to World War I, financial stringency stagnated developments of the railways. In order to meet the necessities of the military authorities, this rail line (along with the Lodhran–Kasur Railway) was dismantled in 1917 during World War I, as the rails were needed elsewhere. In 1922, the track was rebuilt to its present alignment.

== Stations ==
The stations on this line are as follows:

- Hyderabad Junction
- Zeal Pak
- Husri
- Kathar
- Norai Sharif
- Ganja Takkar
- Tando Muhammad
- Nizam Sama Halt
- Matli
- Hakimani Halt
- Palh
- Talhar
- Peeru Lishari
- Yousaf Shah Halt
- Badin

== See also ==
- Karachi–Peshawar Railway Line
- Railway lines in Pakistan
