= Munabao railway station =

Railway station in Rajasthan

Munabao

General information
- Location: Munabao, Barmer district, Rajasthan; India
- Coordinates: 25°44′34″N 70°16′36″E
- Elevation: 80 metres (260 ft)
- System: Indian Railways station
- Owner: Indian Railways
- Operator: North Western Railway
- Line: Marwar Junction–Munabao line
- Platforms: 1
- Tracks: 5 ft 6 in (1,676 mm) broad gauge

Construction
- Structure type: Standard on ground
- Parking: Yes
- Cycle facilities: No

Other information
- Status: Functioning
- Station code: MBF
- Division(s): Jodhpur

History
- Opened: 1902
Location
- Location within India Location within Rajasthan

Munabao railway station is located in Barmer district in the Indian state of Rajasthan. It is a railway transit point on the India–Pakistan border.

== The railway station ==
Munabao railway station is at an elevation of 80 metres (260 ft) and was assigned the code – MBF.

== History ==
A 1,000 mm (3 ft 3 3/8 in)-wide metre-gauge line from Luni to Shadipalli, in Sind, was built across the Thar Desert in 1902 and the line from Shadipalli to Hyderabad (now in Pakistan) was regauged. The Luni–Barmer–Munabao section was converted to 5 ft 6 in (1,676 mm) broad gauge in 2004.

During the Indo-Pakistani war of 1965, the railway station came under the control of Pakistan.

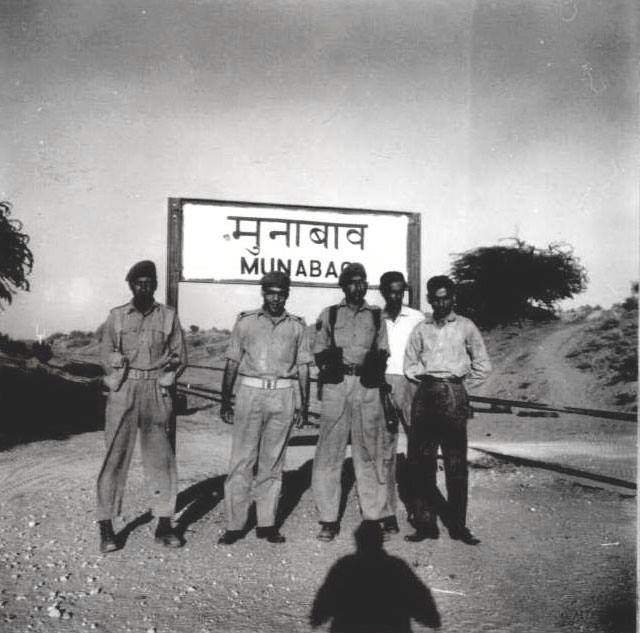
Pakistani troops in Munabao

According to a 1929 issue of the Railway Gazette, the Sind Mail used to run on this route between Ahmedabad and Hyderabad, Sindh. The route was in use with through services between Jodhpur and Karachi till around 1965. On the Pakistan side, Khokhrapar was the terminus of a metre-gauge branch line from Hyderabad, Sindh via Mirpur Khas, 135 km from the border.

The rail link across Munabao–Khokhrapar border was restored in 2006. As per the agreement between Indian and Pakistan railways, the Thar Express travels once a week from Karachi during a six-month block, crosses the international border, and the passengers change over to an Indian train at Munabao for their onward journey to Bhagat Ki Kothi in Jodhpur.

On the Indian side the Thar Link Express runs non-stop once a week from Bhagat Ki Kothi (near Jodhpur) to Munabao and back. Pakistan Railways have set up a new railway station at Zero Point There is a passenger train linking Munabao to Barmer, which runs on all days except Monday.

== Trains ==
Some of the trains that runs from Munabao are:

- Barmer–Munabao Passenger
- Thar Express

== See also ==
- Munabao
- Marwar Junction
- Marwar Junction–Munabao line
- North Western Railway zone

Preceding station	Indian Railways	Following station
Jaisinder towards ?	North Western Railway zone Marwar Junction–Munabao line	Zero Point towards ?
