= Shahpur Chakar railway station =

Railway station in Pakistan

Shahpur Chakar Station شاہ پور چا کر اسٹیشن شاهپور چاڪر ريلوي اسٽيشن

General information
- Owner: Ministry of Railways
- Line: Mirpur Khas–Nawabshah Railway

Other information
- Station code: SPCK

Services
Preceding station	Pakistan Railways	Following station
Khadro towards Mirpur Khas	Mirpur Khas–Nawabshah Railway (defunct)	Sarwar Nagar towards Nawabshah

Shahpur Chakar Railway Station (Urdu: شاہ پور چا کر ریلوے اسٹیشن, Sindhi: شاهپور چاڪر ريلوي اسٽيشن) is located in Pakistan.

== See also ==
- List of railway stations in Pakistan
- Pakistan Railways
