= Balochabad railway station =

Railway station in Sindh, Pakistan

Balochabad Station بلوچ آباد ریلوے اسٹیشن بلوچ آباد ريلوي اسٽيشن

General information
- Coordinates: 25°31′17.5″N 69°8′51.5″E
- Owner: Ministry of Railways
- Line: Hyderabad–Khokhrapar Branch Line

Other information
- Station code: BLBD

Services
Preceding station	Pakistan Railways	Following station
Jamrao Junction towards Kotri Junction	Hyderabad–Khokhrapar Branch Line	Abdullahabad Halt towards Zero Point
Location

Balochabad railway station (Urdu: بلوچ آباد ریلوے اسٹیشن, Sindhi: بلوچ آباد ريلوي اسٽيشن) is located in Sindh, Pakistan.

== See also ==
- List of railway stations in Pakistan
- Pakistan Railways
