= Gul Beg Marri railway station =

Railway station in Pakistan

Coordinates: 26.281085°N 68.571108°E

Gul Beg Marri Station گل بیگ مری ریلوے اسٹیشن گل بيگ مري ريلوي اسٽيشن

General information
- Owner: Ministry of Railways
- Line: Mirpur Khas–Nawabshah Railway

Other information
- Station code: GBM

Services
Preceding station	Pakistan Railways	Following station
Jam Sahib towards Mirpur Khas	Mirpur Khas–Nawabshah Railway (defunct)	Shafiabad towards Nawabshah
Location

Gul Beg Marri Railway Station (Urdu: گل بیگ مری ریلوے اسٹیشن, Sindhi: گل بيگ مري ريلوي اسٽيشن) is located in Pakistan.

== See also ==
- List of railway stations in Pakistan
- Pakistan Railways
