= Barmer–Munabao Passenger =

Train in India

Munabao Barmer Passenger
Overview
- Service type: Passenger
- Locale: Rajasthan
- First service: 21 September 2014
- Current operator: North Western Railway

Route
- Termini: Barmer; Munabao
- Stops: 9
- Distance travelled: 119 km (74 mi)
- Average journey time: 2 hours 10 minutes
- Service frequency: Daily
- Train number: 548817UP / 54882DN

On-board services
- Classes: First Class, Sleeper 3 Tier, Unreserved
- Seating arrangements: Yes
- Sleeping arrangements: Yes
- Catering facilities: No
- Observation facilities: No
- Entertainment facilities: No
- Baggage facilities: No

Technical
- Track gauge: Broad gauge
- Operating speed: 54 km/h (34 mph) average with halts

The Munabao Barmer Passenger is a passenger train of the Indian Railways, which runs between Barmer railway station of Barmer of Rajasthan and Munabao railway station of Munabao, of Indian state Rajasthan.

== Arrival and departure ==
- Train no.54881 departs from Barmer, daily at 07:30, reaching Munabao the same day at 09:40.
- Train no.54882 departs from Munabao daily at 10:30. from platform no.1 reaching Barmer the same day at 12:45.

== Route and halts ==
The important halts of the train are :

- Barmer
- Jasai
- Bhachhbar
- Ramsar
- Gagariya
- Gadra Road
- Jaisinder
- Munabao

== Average speed and frequency ==
The train runs with an average speed of 54 km/h and takes 2h 10m to cover 119 km. The train runs on daily basis.

== Loco link ==
The train is hauled by Abu Road ABR WDM-3A Diesel engine.

== See also ==
- Barmer
- Munabao
- Thar Link Express
