= Jam Sahib railway station =

Railway station in Sindh, Pakistan

Coordinates: 26.28911°N 68.629747°E

Jam Sahib Railway Station جام صاحب ریلوے اسٹیشن ڄام صاحب ريلوي اسٽيشن

General information
- Owner: Ministry of Railways
- Line: Mirpur Khas–Nawabshah Railway

Other information
- Station code: JMSB

Services
Preceding station	Pakistan Railways	Following station
Tando Sarwar towards Mirpur Khas	Mirpur Khas–Nawabshah Railway (defunct)	Gul Beg Marri towards Nawabshah
Location

Jam Sahib Railway Station (Urdu: جام صاحب ریلوے اسٹیشن, Sindhi: ڄام صاحب ريلوي اسٽيشن) was located in Pakistan.

== See also ==
- List of railway stations in Pakistan
- Pakistan Railways
