= Nazikabad railway station =

Railway station in Sindh, Pakistan

Nazikabad Railway Station نازیک آباد ریلوے اسٹیشن نازڪ آباد ريلوي اسٽيشن

General information
- Owner: Ministry of Railways
- Line: Mirpur Khas–Nawabshah Railway

Other information
- Station code: NAZ

Services
Preceding station	Pakistan Railways	Following station
Khan towards Mirpur Khas	Mirpur Khas–Nawabshah Railway (defunct)	Patoyun towards Nawabshah

Nazikabad Railway Station (Urdu: نازیک آباد ریلوے اسٹیشن, Sindhi: نازڪ آباد ريلوي اسٽيشن) was located in Sindh, Pakistan on the now defunct Mirpur Khas to Nawabshah line.

== See also ==
- List of railway stations in Pakistan
- Pakistan Railways
