= Bobi Road railway station =

Railway station in Pakistan

Coordinates: 25.892297°N 68.918477°E

Bobi Road Railway Station بوبی روڈ ریلوے اسٹیشن ٻوٻي روڊ ريلوي اسٽيشن

General information
- Owner: Ministry of Railways
- Line: Mirpur Khas–Nawabshah Railway

Other information
- Station code: BBIR

Services
| Preceding station | Pakistan Railways | Following station |
|---|---|---|
| Nadabad towards Mirpur Khas | Mirpur Khas–Nawabshah Railway (defunct) | Jhol towards Nawabshah |
Location

Bobi Road Railway Station (Urdu: بوبی روڈ ریلوے اسٹیشن, Sindhi: ٻوٻي روڊ ريلوي اسٽيشن) is located in Pakistan.

== See also ==
- List of railway stations in Pakistan
- Pakistan Railways
