= Nadabad railway station =

Railway station in Pakistan

Nadabad Railway Station نادآباد ریلوے اسٹیشن نادآباد ريلوي اسٽيشن

General information
- Owner: Ministry of Railways
- Line: Mirpur Khas–Nawabshah Railway

Other information
- Station code: NAO

Services
Preceding station	Pakistan Railways	Following station
Patoyun towards Mirpur Khas	Mirpur Khas–Nawabshah Railway (defunct)	Bobi Road towards Nawabshah

Nadabad Railway Station (Urdu: نادآباد ریلوے اسٹیشن, Sindhi: نادآباد ريلوي اسٽيشن) is located in Pakistan.

== See also ==
- List of railway stations in Pakistan
- Pakistan Railways
