= Sinjhoro railway station =

Railway station in Pakistan

Sinjhoro Railway Station سنجھورو ریلوے اسٹیشن سنجهورو ريلوي اسٽيشن

General information
- Owner: Ministry of Railways
- Line: Mirpur Khas–Nawabshah Railway

Other information
- Station code: SIJ

Services
Preceding station	Pakistan Railways	Following station
Jhol towards Mirpur Khas	Mirpur Khas–Nawabshah Railway (defunct)	Rajar towards Nawabshah

Sinjhoro Railway Station (Urdu: سنجھورو ریلوے اسٹیشن, Sindhi: سنجهورو ريلوي اسٽيشن) is located in Pakistan.

== See also ==
- List of railway stations in Pakistan
- Pakistan Railways
