= Tando Sarwar railway station =

Railway station in Pakistan

Tando Sarwar Station ٹنڈو سرور ریلوے اسٹیشن ٽنڊو سرور ريلوي اسٽيشن

General information
- Owner: Ministry of Railways
- Line: Mirpur Khas–Nawabshah Railway

Other information
- Station code: TSU

Services
Preceding station	Pakistan Railways	Following station
Sarwar Nagar towards Mirpur Khas	Mirpur Khas–Nawabshah Railway (defunct)	Jam Sahib towards Nawabshah

Tando Sarwar Railway Station (Urdu: ٹنڈو سرور ریلوے اسٹیشن, Sindhi: ٽنڊو سرور ريلوي اسٽيشن) is located in Pakistan.

== See also ==
- List of railway stations in Pakistan
- Pakistan Railways
