= Rajar railway station =

Railway station in Pakistan

Rajar Railway Station راجر ریلوے اسٹیشن راڄڙ ريلوي اسٽيشن

General information
- Owner: Ministry of Railways
- Line: Mirpur Khas–Nawabshah Railway

Other information
- Station code: RJH

Services
| Preceding station | Pakistan Railways | Following station |
|---|---|---|
| Sinjhoro towards Mirpur Khas | Mirpur Khas–Nawabshah Railway (defunct) | Khadro towards Nawabshah |

Rajar Railway Station (Urdu: راجر ریلوے اسٹیشن, Sindhi: راڄڙ ريلوي اسٽيشن) is a train station located in Pakistan. It is in currently in use by Pakistan Railways.

== See also ==
- List of railway stations in Pakistan
- Pakistan Railways
