= Patoyun railway station =

Railway station in Pakistan

Coordinates: 25.743827°N 68.962878°E

Patoyun Railway Station پاٹویوں ریلوے اسٹیشن پاٽويون ريلوي اسٽيشن

General information
- Owner: Ministry of Railways
- Line: Mirpur Khas–Nawabshah Railway

Other information
- Station code: PYO

Services
Preceding station	Pakistan Railways	Following station
Nazikabad towards Mirpur Khas	Mirpur Khas–Nawabshah Railway (defunct)	Nadabad towards Nawabshah
Location

Patoyun Railway Station (Urdu: پاٹویوں ریلوے اسٹیشن, Sindhi: پاٽويون ريلوي اسٽيشن) is located in Pakistan.

== See also ==
- List of railway stations in Pakistan
- Pakistan Railways
