= Sarwar Nagar railway station =

Railway station in Pakistan

Sarwar Nagar Railway Station سرور نگر ریلوے اسٹیشن سرور نگر ريلوي اسٽيشن

General information
- Owner: Ministry of Railways
- Line: Mirpur Khas–Nawabshah Railway

Other information
- Station code: SNRR

Services
Preceding station	Pakistan Railways	Following station
Shahpur Chakar towards Mirpur Khas	Mirpur Khas–Nawabshah Railway (defunct)	Tando Sarwar towards Nawabshah

Sarwar Nagar Railway Station (Urdu: سرور نگر ریلوے اسٹیشن، Sindhi: سرور نگر ريلوي اسٽيشن) is located in Pakistan.

== See also ==
- List of railway stations in Pakistan
- Pakistan Railways
