= Khadro railway station =

Railway station in Pakistan

Khadro Railway Station کھڈرو ریلوے اسٹیشن کڏڙو ريلوي اسٽيشن

General information
- Owner: Ministry of Railways
- Line: Mirpur Khas–Nawabshah Railway

Other information
- Station code: KHDO

Services
| Preceding station | Pakistan Railways | Following station |
|---|---|---|
| Rajar towards Mirpur Khas | Mirpur Khas–Nawabshah Railway (defunct) | Shahpur Chakar towards Nawabshah |

Khadro Railway Station (Urdu: کھڈرو ریلوے اسٹیشن, Sindhi: کڏڙو ريلوي اسٽيشن) is located in Khadro, District Sanghar, Pakistan.

== See also ==
- List of railway stations in Pakistan
- Pakistan Railways
