= Jhol railway station =

Railway station in Pakistan

Jhol Railway Station جھول ریلوے اسٹیشن جهول ريلوي اسٽيشن

General information
- Owner: Ministry of Railways
- Line: Mirpur Khas–Nawabshah Railway

Other information
- Station code: JHO

Services
Preceding station	Pakistan Railways	Following station
Bobi Road towards Mirpur Khas	Mirpur Khas–Nawabshah Railway (defunct)	Sinjhoro towards Nawabshah

Jhol Railway Station (Urdu: جھول ریلوے اسٹیشن, Sindhi: جهول ريلوي اسٽيشن) is located in Pakistan.

== See also ==
- List of railway stations in Pakistan
- Pakistan Railways
