= Faqir Turko Mangrio railway station =

Railway station in Pakistan

Faqir Turko Mangrio Station فقیر ترکو ریلوے اسٹیشن فقير ترڪو مڱريو ريلوي اسٽيشن

General information
- Other names: Faqir Turko halt
- Owner: Ministry of Railways
- Line: Hyderabad–Khokhrapar Branch Line

History
- Former names: Hiral railway station

Services
Preceding station	Pakistan Railways	Following station
Pithoro Junction towards Kotri Junction	Hyderabad–Khokhrapar Branch Line	Dhoro Naro towards Zero Point
Location

Faqir Turko Mangrio Railway Station (Urdu: فقير ترکو منگريو اسٹیشن, Sindhi: فقير ترڪو مڱريو ريلوي اسٽيشن) is located in Sindh, Pakistan.

== See also ==
- List of railway stations in Pakistan
- Pakistan Railways
