= Shafiabad railway station =

Railway station in Pakistan

Shafiabad Railway Station شفیع آباد ریلوے اسٹیشن شفيع آباد ريلوي اسٽيشن

General information
- Owner: Ministry of Railways
- Line: Mirpur Khas–Nawabshah Railway

Other information
- Station code: SFBD

Services
Preceding station	Pakistan Railways	Following station
Gul Beg Marri towards Mirpur Khas	Mirpur Khas–Nawabshah Railway (defunct)	Nawabshah Terminus

Shafiabad Railway Station (Urdu: شفیع آباد ریلوے اسٹیشن, Sindhi: شفيع آباد ريلوي اسٽيشن) is located in Pakistan.

== See also ==
- List of railway stations in Pakistan
- Pakistan Railways
