= Hyderabad Junction railway station =

Railway station in Sindh, Pakistan

Hyderabad Junction Railway Station حیدرآباد جنکشن ریلوے اسٹیشن حيدرآباد جنڪشن
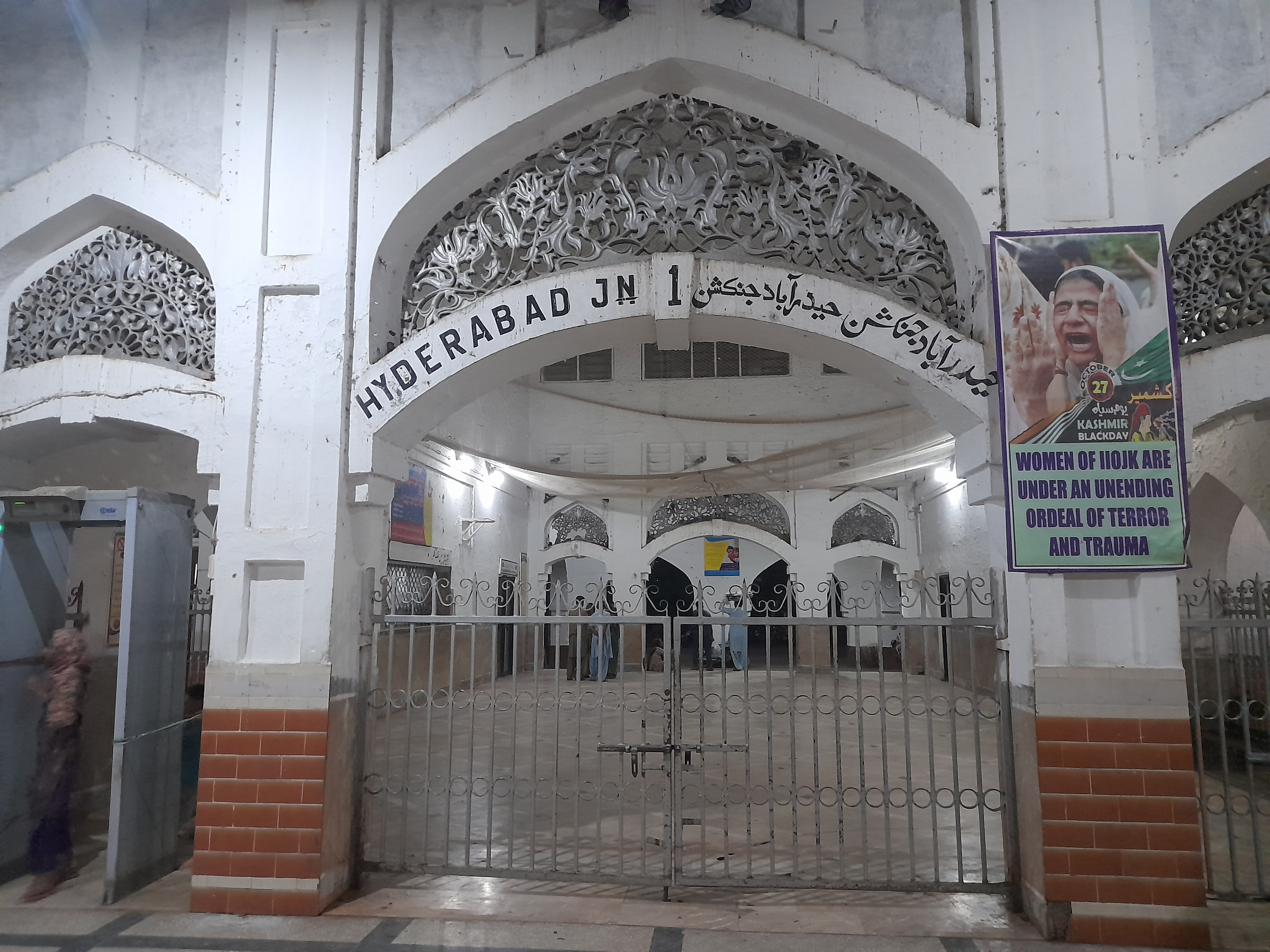
- Main building of the Hyderabad Junction, established in 1861

General information
- Coordinates: 25.3811°N 68.37349891662598°E
- Owner: Ministry of Railways
- Lines: Karachi–Peshawar Railway Line; Hyderabad–Badin Branch Line; Hyderabad–Khokhrapar Branch Line
- Platforms: 5
- Tracks: 8

Construction
- Structure type: Standard (on the ground)
- Parking: Available
- Accessible: Available

Other information
- Station code: HDR

History
- Opened: 1861

Services
| Preceding station | Pakistan Railways | Following station |
|---|---|---|
| Kotri Junction towards Kiamari | Karachi–Peshawar Line | Detha towards Peshawar Cantonment |
| Kotri Junction Terminus | Hyderabad–Badin Branch Line | Zeal Pak towards Badin |
| Kotri Junction Terminus | Hyderabad–Khokhrapar Branch Line | Tando Jam towards Zero Point |
Location

Hyderabad Junction Railway Station (Sindhi: حيدرآباد جنڪشن ريلوي اسٽيشن) is located in the city of Hyderabad, Sindh, Pakistan and serves as a major railway junction.

Hyderabad Railway Station Inquiry Number: 022-9200258

== History ==
Hyderabad Junction railway station was established in 1861 as part of Karachi-Kotri railway line. The construction work started when a memorandum of understanding (MoU) was signed between the Scinde Railway and East India Company in 1855.

In April 1858, Sir Henry Bartle Frere inaugurated the civil work in an official ceremony.

== Railway chief engineers ==
- Mr. Wells
- Mr. Brunton

== Services ==
The following trains stop at Hyderabad Junction station:

| Preceding station | Pakistan Railways | Following station |
|---|---|---|
| Kotri Junction towards Karachi Cantonment | Allama Iqbal Express | Tando Adam Junction towards Sialkot Junction |
| Terminus | Badin Express | Zeal Pak towards Badin |
| Kotri Junction towards Karachi Cantonment | Khyber Mail | Nawabshah towards Peshawar Cantonment |

== Gallery ==
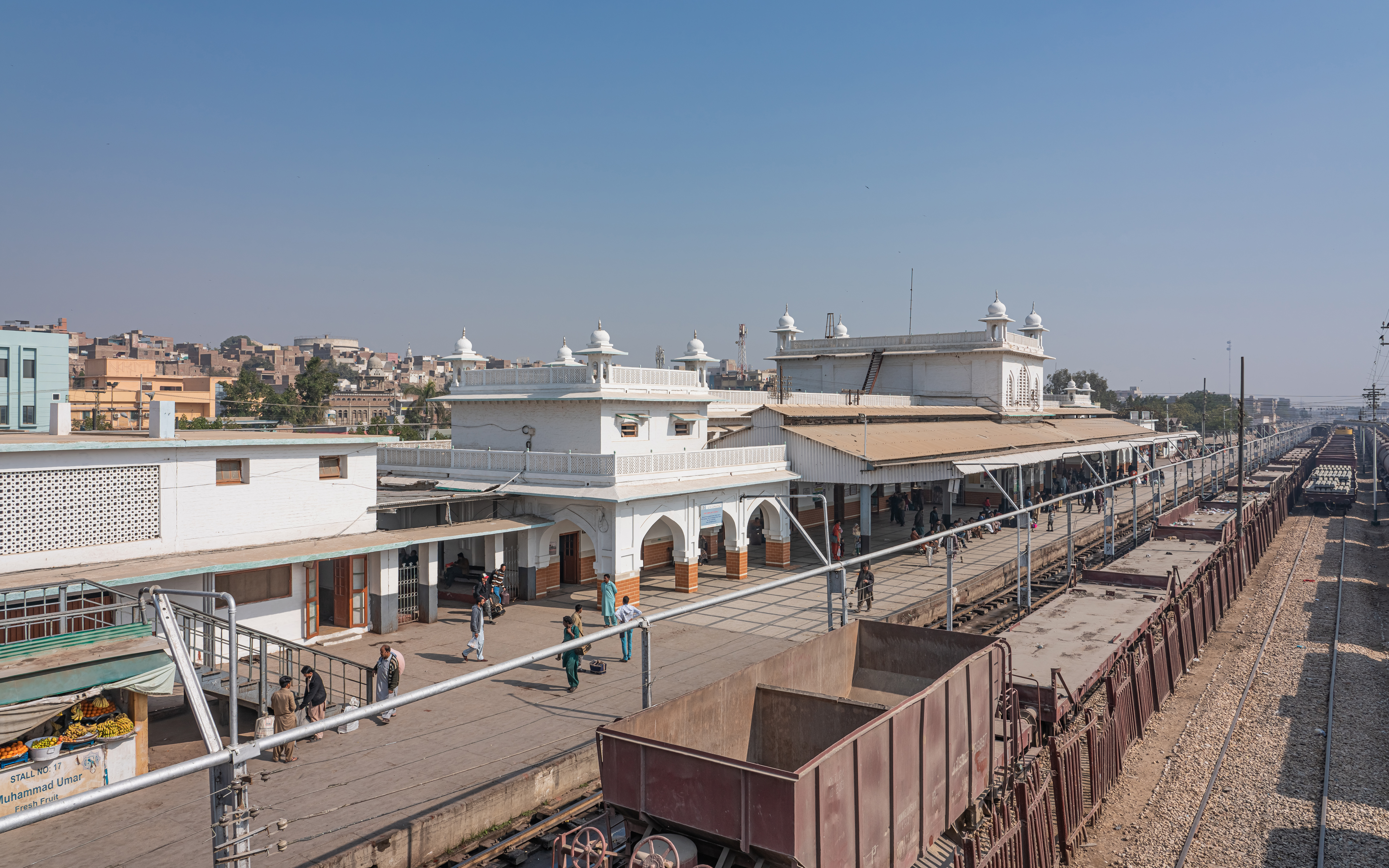
A view of the Hyderabad Junction from the top

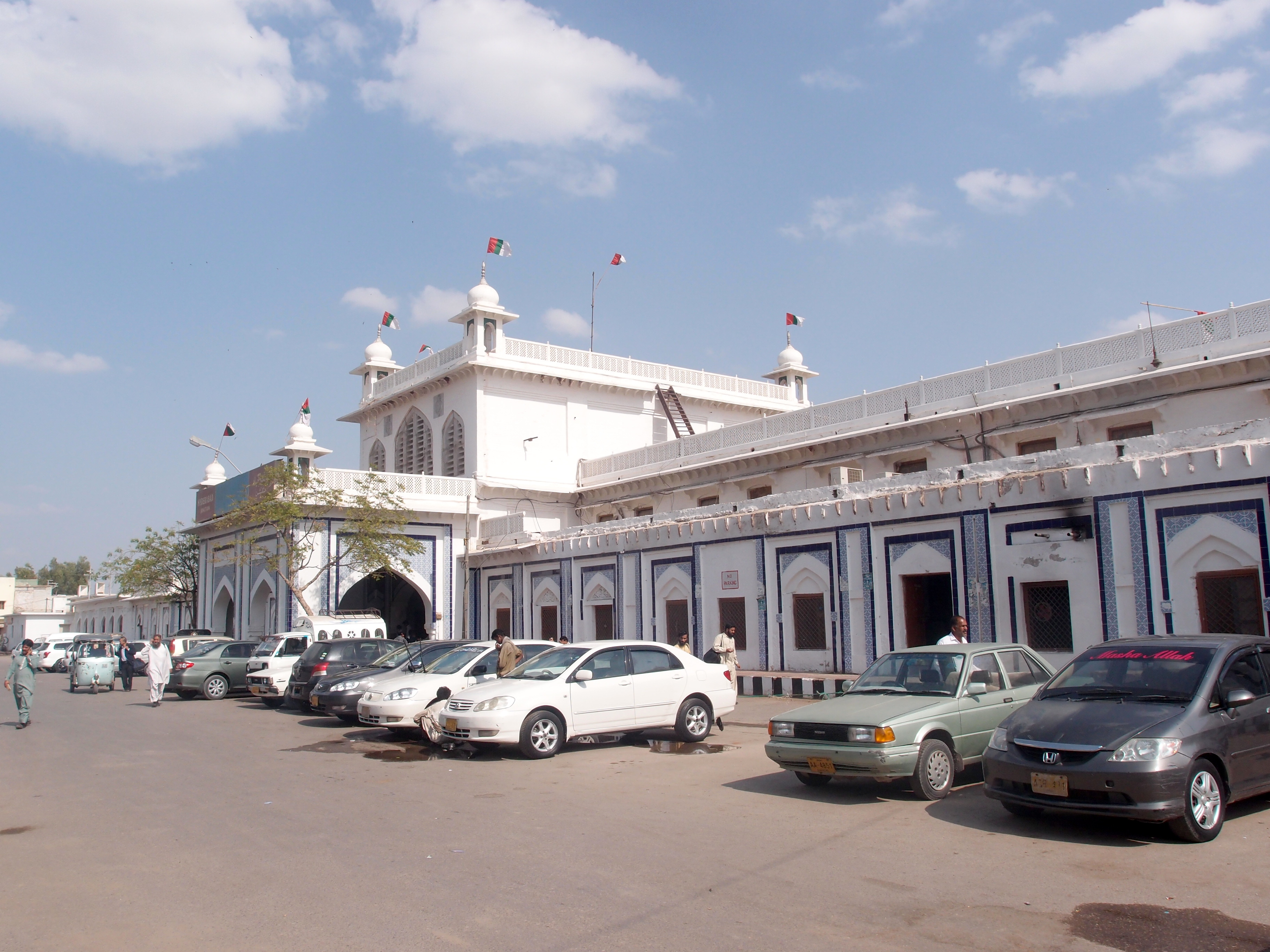
Outside view of the Hyderabad Junction

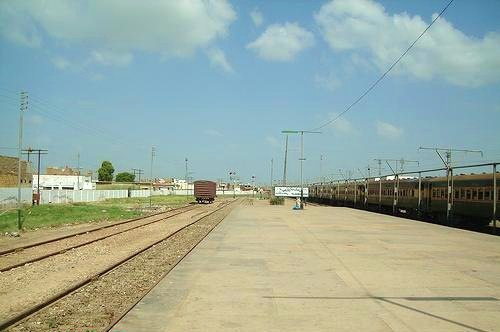
A platform of Hyderabad Junction

== See also ==
- List of railway stations in Pakistan
- Pakistan Railways
