= Saindad Halt railway station =

Railway station in Sindh, Pakistan

Saindad Halt Station سائیں داد ریلوے اسٹیشن سائينداد ريلوي اسٽيشن

General information
- Owner: Ministry of Railways
- Line: Hyderabad–Khokhrapar Branch Line

Other information
- Station code: SAND

Services
Preceding station	Pakistan Railways	Following station
Shadipalli towards Kotri Junction	Hyderabad–Khokhrapar Branch Line	Pithoro Junction towards Zero Point
Location

The Saindad Halt railway station (Urdu: سائیں داد ریلوے اسٹیشن, Sindhi: سائينداد ريلوي اسٽيشن) is a Pakistan Railways station located in Sindh, Pakistan.

== See also ==
- List of railway stations in Pakistan
- Pakistan Railways
