= Marwar Junction–Munabao line =

Railway line in India

Overview
- Status: Operational
- Owner: Indian Railways
- Locale: Thar Desert, Rajasthan
- Termini: Marwar Junction; Munabao

Service
- Operator: North Western Railway zone

History
- Opened: 1902; 124 years ago

Technical
- Track length: Marwar Junction–Munabao: 370 km (230 mi); Luni–Jodhpur: 30 km (19 mi)
- Track gauge: 1,676 mm (5 ft 6 in)
- Electrification: Yes
- Operating speed: 100 km/h
- Highest elevation: Marwar Junction 267 m (876 ft)

The Marwar Junction–Munabao line connects Marwar Junction, on the Jaipur–Ahmedabad line to Munabao, the last station in India, near the India–Pakistan border. Both are in the Indian state of Rajasthan. There is a link to Jodhpur. This line operates under the jurisdiction of North Western Railway zone.

== History ==
A 1,000 mm (3 ft 3 3/8 in)-wide metre-gauge line from Marwar Junction to Pali was built by the Rajputana Railway in 1882. It was extended to Luni in 1884 and Jodhpur in 1885. It formed the first Jodhpur Railway. It later became part of Jodhpur–Bikaner Railway.

A metre-gauge line from Luni to Shadipalli, in Sind, was built across the Thar Desert in 1902 by Jodhpur–Bikaner Railway and the line from Shadipalli to Hyderabad (now in Pakistan) was regauged from 1,676 mm (5 ft 6 in) broad gauge to 1,000 mm (3 ft 3 3/8 in) meter gauge in 1901.

The Luni–Barmer–Munabao section was converted to 1,676 mm (5 ft 6 in)-wide broad gauge in 2004. The Jodhpur–Luni–Marwar Junction section was converted to broad gauge in early 2000s.

== Border crossing ==
According to a 1929 issue of the Railway Gazette, the Sind Mail used to run on this route between Ahmedabad and Hyderabad, Sind. The route was in use with through services between Jodhpur and Karachi till around 1965. On the Pakistan side, Khokhrapar was the terminus of a branch line from Hyderabad, Sind via Mirpur Khas, 135 km from the border.

The rail link across Munabao-Khokhrapar border was restored in 2006. It reduced considerably the travel distance and time for people travelling to and from southern parts of Pakistan, particularly Mohajirs in Sind, and central and southern India. They otherwise would have had to use the longer route via Wagah-Attari. As per the agreement between Indian and Pakistan railways, the Thar Express travels once a week from Karachi during a six-month block, crosses the international border, and the passengers change over to an Indian train at Munabao for their onward journey to Jodhpur. Service on the Munabao-Khokhrapar link of the India–Pakistan border was suspended on 24 August 2006 following incessant rain and water-logging on the Indian side and restored on 17 February 2007. Pakistan Railways have set up a new railway station at Zero Point

== Passenger movement ==
Jodhpur is the only railway station on this line which is amongst the top hundred booking stations of Indian Railway.

== Sheds and workshops ==
The former metre-gauge workshop at Jodhpur now performs periodic overhauling of broad-gauge passenger coaches. The former metre-gauge diesel shed at Bhagat ki Kothi was converted to broad-gauge shed in the 1990s. It houses 133+ electro-motive diesel locos. It is home to WDG-4, WDP-4, WDM-2. WDM-3A and WDG-3A locomotives.
