= RHK =

RHK may refer to:

- Radio Hong Kong, the public broadcasting service in Hong Kong
- Rhein-Herne-Kanal, a transportation canal in Germany
- Rhön-Klinikum, the FWB code RHK
- Rahuki railway station, the station code RHK
- Hockenheim station, the DS100 code RHK
- Randers HK, a women's handball club based in Randers, Denmark
