= Hasisar railway station =

Railway station in Sindh, Pakistan

Hasisar Railway Station حسیصر ریلوے اسٹیشن

General information
- Owner: Ministry of Railways
- Line: Hyderabad–Khokhrapar Branch Line

Other information
- Station code: HSS

Services
Preceding station	Pakistan Railways	Following station
Sadhar Halt towards Kotri Junction	Hyderabad–Khokhrapar Branch Line	Sumrasar Halt towards Zero Point
Location

Hasisar Railway Station (Urdu: حسیصر ریلوے اسٹیشن, Sindhi: حسیصر ریلوے اسٹیشن) is located in Sindh, Pakistan.

== See also ==
- List of railway stations in Pakistan
- Pakistan Railways
