= Dhoro Naro railway station =

Railway station in Sindh, Pakistan

Dhoro Naro Railway Station ڈھورو نارو ریلوے اسٹیشن ڍورو نارو ريلوي اسٽيشن

General information
- Coordinates: 25.5027°N 69.5641°E
- Owner: Ministry of Railways
- Line: Hyderabad–Khokhrapar Branch Line

Other information
- Station code: DNO

Services
Preceding station	Pakistan Railways	Following station
Faqir Turko Mangrio towards Kotri Junction	Hyderabad–Khokhrapar Branch Line	Sadhar Halt towards Zero Point
Location

Dhoro Naro Railway Station (Urdu: ڈھورو نارو ریلوے اسٹیشن, Sindhi: ڍورو نارو ريلوي اسٽيشن) is located in Sindh, Pakistan.

== See also ==
- List of railway stations in Pakistan
- Pakistan Railways
