= Rashidabad railway station =

Railway station in Pakistan

Rashidabad Station راشد آباد ریلوے اسٹیشن راشدآباد ريلوي اسٽيشن

General information
- Coordinates: 25.4601°N 68.6745°E
- Owner: Ministry of Railways
- Line: Hyderabad–Khokhrapar Branch Line

History
- Opened: 2003

Services
Preceding station	Pakistan Railways	Following station
Tajpur Nasarpur Road towards Kotri Junction	Hyderabad–Khokhrapar Branch Line	Tando Allahyar towards Zero Point
Location

Rashidabad Railway Station (Urdu: راشد آباد ریلوے اسٹیشن, Sindhi: راشدآباد ريلوي اسٽيشن) is a railway station in Sindh, Pakistan, on the Hyderabad-Khokhrapar Branch Line.

== See also ==
- List of railway stations in Pakistan
- Pakistan Railways
