= Abdullahabad Halt railway station =

Railway station in Sindh, Pakistan

Abdullahabad Halt Station عبد الله آباد ہالٹ ریلوے اسٹیشن عبداللّٰه آباد هالٽ ريلوي اسٽيشن

General information
- Coordinates: 25°31′13.3″N 69°10′54.5″E
- Owner: Ministry of Railways
- Line: Hyderabad–Khokhrapar Branch Line

Other information
- Station code: AABD

Services
Preceding station	Pakistan Railways	Following station
Balochabad towards Kotri Junction	Hyderabad–Khokhrapar Branch Line	Shadipalli towards Zero Point
Location

Abdullahabad Halt railway station (Urdu: عبد الله آباد ہالٹ ریلوے اسٹیشن, Sindhi: عبد الله آباد هالٽ ريلوي اسٽيشن) is located in Sindh, Pakistan.

== See also ==
- List of railway stations in Pakistan
- Pakistan Railways
