= Tajpur Nasarpur Road railway station =

Railway station in Pakistan

Tajpur Nasarpur Road Station تاج پور نصرپور روڈ ریلوے اسٹیشن تاجپور نصرپور روڊ ريلوي اسٽيشن

General information
- Coordinates: 25°26′59.6″N 68°36′29.5″E
- Owner: Ministry of Railways

Other information
- Station code: TJNR

Services
Preceding station	Pakistan Railways	Following station
Tando Jam towards Kotri Junction	Hyderabad–Khokhrapar Branch Line	Rashidabad Halt towards Zero Point
Location

Tajpur Nasarpur Road Railway Station (Urdu: تاج پور نصرپور روڈ ریلوے اسٹیشن, Sindhi: تاجپور نصرپور ريلوي اسٽيشن) is located in Pakistan.

== See also ==
- List of railway stations in Pakistan
- Pakistan Railways
