= Norai Sharif railway station =

Railway station in Pakistan

Norai Sharif Railway Station نورائی شریف ریلوے اسٹیشن نورائي شريف ريلوي اسٽيشن

General information
- Coordinates: 25.1709°N 68.4673°E
- Owner: Ministry of Railways
- Line: Hyderabad–Badin Branch Line

Other information
- Station code: NRSF

Services
Preceding station	Pakistan Railways	Following station
Khathar towards Kotri Junction	Hyderabad–Badin Branch Line	Tando Muhammad Khan towards Badin
Location

Norai Sharif Railway Station (Urdu: نورائی شریف ریلوے اسٹیشن, Sindhi: نورائي شريف ريلوي اسٽيشن) is located in Sindh, Pakistan.

== See also ==
- List of railway stations in Pakistan
- Pakistan Railways
