= GJT =

GJT may refer to:

- Ganja Takkar railway station, in Pakistan
- Girjet, a defunct Spanish airline
- Grand Junction Regional Airport, in Colorado
- Grand Junction (Amtrak station), in Colorado
