= Tando Jam railway station =

Railway station in Pakistan

Tando Jam Railway Station ٹنڈو جام ریلوے اسٹیشن ٽنڊو ڄام ريلوي اسٽيشن

General information
- Coordinates: 25.4319°N 68.5343°E
- Owner: Ministry of Railways
- Line: Hyderabad–Khokhrapar Branch Line

Other information
- Station code: JTD

Services
Preceding station	Pakistan Railways	Following station
Hyderabad Junction towards Kotri Junction	Hyderabad–Khokhrapar Branch Line	Tajpur Nasarpur Road towards Zero Point
Location

Tando Jam Railway Station (Urdu: ٹنڈو جام ریلوے اسٹیشن, Sindhi: ٽنڊو ڄام ريلوي اسٽيشن) is located in Tando Jam, Sindh, Pakistan.

== See also ==
- List of railway stations in Pakistan
- Pakistan Railways
