= Mirpur Khas–Nawabshah Railway =

Railway branch line in Pakistan

Mirpur Khas-Nawabshah Railway ميرپورخاص–نوابشاهه ریلوے ميرپور خاص ـ نواب شاھ ريلوي لائين

Overview
- Status: Closed
- Owner: Pakistan Railways
- Termini: Mirpur Khas Junction; Nawabshah Junction

Service
- Operator(s): Pakistan Railways

History
- Opened: 1 January 1912
- Closed: 2005

Technical
- Line length: 325 km (202 mi)
- Track gauge: 1,000 mm (3 ft 3 3/8 in)

The Mirpur Khas–Nawabshah Railway (Urdu: ميرپورخاص–نوابشاهه ریلوے, Sindhi: ميرپور خاص ـ نواب شاھ ريلوي لائين) was one of several branch lines in Pakistan, operated and maintained by Pakistan Railways. The line was unique in that it was one of the few 1,000 mm (3 ft 3 3/8 in) Metre gauge railways in the region. The line began at Mirpur Khas Junction and ended at Nawabshah Junction. The total length of this railway line was 325 kilometers (202 mi) with 15 railway stations.

== History ==
Following the completion of the Hyderabad–Jodhpur Railway in 1892, and its subsequent conversion from broad gauge to metre gauge in 1901, plans to extend the metre gauge network through Sindh were proposed. In 1909, the metre gauge railway was extended from Mirpur Khas northwards to Nawabshah and southwards to Jhudo. The railway reached Khadro in 1912 and Nawabshah in 1939. The railway heavily used for freight transport, most of which was cotton, fresh vegetables and large quantities of red chilies.

== Closure ==
The railway continued to operate through the 1990s despite degradation of the line and was closed in February 2005.

== Stations ==
The stations on this line are as follows:

- Mirpur Khas Junction
- Khan
- Nazikabad
- Patoyun
- Nao-Abad
- Bobi Road
- Jhol
- Sinjhoro
- Rajar Pak
- Khadro
- Shahpur Chakar
- Sarwar Nagar
- Tando Sarwar
- Jam Sahib
- Gul Beg Marri
- Shafiabad
- Nawabshah Junction

== See also ==
- Railway lines in Pakistan
