= Sadhar Halt railway station =

Railway station in Sindh, Pakistan

Sadhar Halt Railway Station سادھر ہالٹ ریلوے اسٹیشن ساڌر هالٽ ريلوي اسٽيشن

General information
- Coordinates: 25.5007°N 69.6102°E
- Owner: Ministry of Railways
- Line: Hyderabad–Khokhrapar Branch Line

Other information
- Station code: SADR

Services
Preceding station	Pakistan Railways	Following station
Dhoro Naro towards Kotri Junction	Hyderabad–Khokhrapar Branch Line	Hasisar towards Zero Point
Location

Sadhar Halt Railway Station (Urdu: سادھر ہالٹ ریلوے اسٹیشن, Sindhi: ساڌر هالٽ ريلوي اسٽيشن) is located in Sindh, Pakistan.

== See also ==
- List of railway stations in Pakistan
- Pakistan Railways
