= Khan railway station =

Railway station in Pakistan

Coordinates: 25°37′N 68°58′E

Khan Railway Station خان ریلوے اسٹیشن خان ريلوي اسٽيشن

General information
- Owner: Ministry of Railways
- Line: Mirpur Khas–Nawabshah Railway

Other information
- Station code: KAN

Services
Preceding station	Pakistan Railways	Following station
Mirpur Khas Terminus	Mirpur Khas–Nawabshah Railway (defunct)	Nazikabad towards Nawabshah
Location

Khan Railway Station (Urdu: خان ریلوے اسٹیشن, Sindhi: خان ريلوي اسٽيشن) is located in Pakistan.

== See also ==
- List of railway stations in Pakistan
- Pakistan Railways
