= YSF =

YSF may refer to:

- Stony Rapids Airport (IATA airport code YSF), Saskatchewan, Canada
- Yousaf Shah Halt railway station (Pakistan Railways code YSF), Pakistan
- Yaesu System Fusion
