= Shadipalli railway station =

Railway station in Sindh, Pakistan

Shadipalli Station شادی پلی ریلوے اسٹیشن شادي پلي ريلوي اسٽيشن

General information
- Coordinates: 25.5181°N 69.2342°E
- Owner: Ministry of Railways
- Line: Hyderabad–Khokhrapar Branch Line

Other information
- Station code: SPI

Services
Preceding station	Pakistan Railways	Following station
Abdullahabad Halt towards Kotri Junction	Hyderabad–Khokhrapar Branch Line	Saindad towards Zero Point
Location
- Location within Pakistan Location within Sindh

Shadipalli Railway Station (Urdu: شادی پلی ریلوے اسٹیشن, Sindhi: شادي پلي ريلوي اسٽيشن) is located in Sindh, Pakistan. ShadiPalli town located near the five-kilometre Mirpurkhas Umerkot Road Tehsil Pithoro District Umerkot Division Mirpurkhas

1. Institutes: GBHSS ShadiPalli, GBS ShadiPalli, GGHS ShadiPalli
2. Health: Basic Health unit Shadi palli
3. Police Station ShadiPalli
4. Shrine of Baba Umar Malang (Hazart Muhammad Umar Shaikh) located in this town, Dr Muhammad Usman Shaikh is Sajadah Nasheen of this Dargah

== See also ==
- List of railway stations in Pakistan
- Pakistan Railways
