= Sind Mail =

Indian train line (discontinued)

Sind Mail was a passenger train that ran between Bombay and Karachi during the British era in British India. This train used to operate via Ahmedabad–Palanpur–Marwar–Pali–Jodhpur–Luni–Barmer–Munabao–Khokhrapar–Mirpur Khas–Hyderabad. After partition this train was cut short from Hyderabad in Pakistan to Jodhpur in India. This train ran till 1965 and was discontinued due to 1965 war. Today Thar Express operate on this route.

== See also ==
- Thar Express
- Thar Link Express
