= Palh railway station =

Railway station in Sindh, Pakistan

Coordinates: 24.961975°N 68.760179°E

Palh Railway Station پلہ ریلوے اسٹیشن پلھ ريلوي اسٽيشن

General information
- Owner: Ministry of Railways
- Line: Hyderabad–Badin Branch Line

Other information
- Station code: PALH

Services
Preceding station	Pakistan Railways	Following station
Matli towards Kotri Junction	Hyderabad–Badin Branch Line	Talhar towards Badin
Location

Palh Railway Station (Urdu: پلہ ریلوے اسٹیشن, Sindhi: پلھ ريلوي اسٽيشن) is located in Sindh, Pakistan.

== See also ==
- List of railway stations in Pakistan
- Pakistan Railways
