= Daur railway station =

Railway station in Pakistan

Daur Railway Station ڈور ریلوے اسٹیشن

General information
- Coordinates: 26.4588°N 68.3205°E
- Owner: Ministry of Railways
- Line: Karachi–Peshawar Railway Line

Other information
- Station code: DOU

Services
Preceding station	Pakistan Railways	Following station
Bucheri towards Kiamari	Karachi–Peshawar Line	Bandhi towards Peshawar Cantonment
Location

Daur Railway Station (Urdu: ڈور ریلوے اسٹیشن, Sindhi: دوڙ ريلوي اسٽيشن) is in Daur city, in the Shaheed Benazir Abad district of Sindh province, Pakistan.

== Daur Railway Station Time Table of Pakistan Railways Trains ==
Train Name	Code	Arrival	Departure
13UP Awam Express	13UP	12:18:00	12:20:00
14DN Awam Express	14DN	12:40:00	12:42:00
25UP Bahauddin Zakria Express	25UP	22:58:00	23:00:00
26DN Bahauddin Zakria Express	26DN	02:12:00	02:14:00

45UP	Pakistan Express	45UP	3:41:00	3:43:00
46DN	Pakistan Express	46DN	4:32:00	4:34:00

== See also ==
- List of railway stations in Pakistan
