= Zeal Pak railway station =

Railway station in Pakistan

Zeal Pak Railway Station ذیل پاک ریلوے اسٹیشن ذيل پاڪ ريلوي اسٽيشن

General information
- Owner: Ministry of Railways
- Line: Hyderabad–Badin Branch Line

Other information
- Station code: ZPK

Services
Preceding station	Pakistan Railways	Following station
Hyderabad Junction towards Kotri Junction	Hyderabad–Badin Branch Line	Khathar towards Badin

Zeal Pak Railway Station (Urdu: ذیل پاک ریلوے اسٹیشن, Sindhi: ذيل پاڪ ريلوي اسٽيشن) is located in Sindh, Pakistan.

== See also ==
- List of railway stations in Pakistan
- Pakistan Railways
