= Jamrao Junction railway station =

Railway station in Pakistan

Jamrao Junction Station جمراؤ جنکشن ریلوے اسٹیشن جمڙائو جنڪشن ريلوي اسٽيشن

General information
- Coordinates: 25.5241°N 69.0954°E
- Owner: Ministry of Railways
- Line: Hyderabad–Khokhrapar Branch Line

Other information
- Station code: JMO

Services
Preceding station	Pakistan Railways	Following station
Mirpur Khas towards Kotri Junction	Hyderabad–Khokhrapar Branch Line	Pithoro Junction towards Zero Point
Location

Jamrao Junction Railway Station (Urdu: جمراؤ جنکشن ریلوے اسٹیشن, Sindhi: جمڙائو جنڪشن ريلوي اسٽيشن) is located in Pakistan. The station building is abandoned.

== See also ==
- List of railway stations in Pakistan
- Pakistan Railways
