= Thar Express =

International train service between India and Pakistan

Overview
- Service type: Inter-city rail
- First service: 18 February 2006
- Last service: August 8, 2019; 7 years ago
- Current operators: North Western Railway zone of Indian Railways & Pakistan Railways

Route
- Termini: Bhagat Ki Kothi (Jodhpur); Karachi Cantonment
- Stops: 4
- Distance travelled: 709 kilometres (441 mi)
- Average journey time: 13 hours, 5 minutes
- Service frequency: Weekly

On-board services
- Class: Economy
- Sleeping arrangements: Not available
- Catering facilities: Not available

Technical
- Track gauge: 1,676 mm (5 ft 6 in)

The Thar Express was an international passenger train that ran between the Bhagat Ki Kothi a suburban area of Jodhpur in the Indian State of Rajasthan and Karachi Cantonment of Karachi in the Pakistani Province of Sindh. The name of the train is derived from the Thar Desert, a sub-continental desert which lies in the north-western part of the Indian subcontinent and ranks 17th in the world covering an area of 200,000 km^{2} (77,000 sq mi).

It was the second train after the Samjhauta Express for direct connectivity between India and Pakistan on the basis of Simla Agreement after the restoring of the Jodhpur–Hyderabad rail route which was closed for 41 years till 2006.

As of 9 August 2019, the Thar Express had been cancelled until further notice due to escalating tensions between India and Pakistan.

== History ==
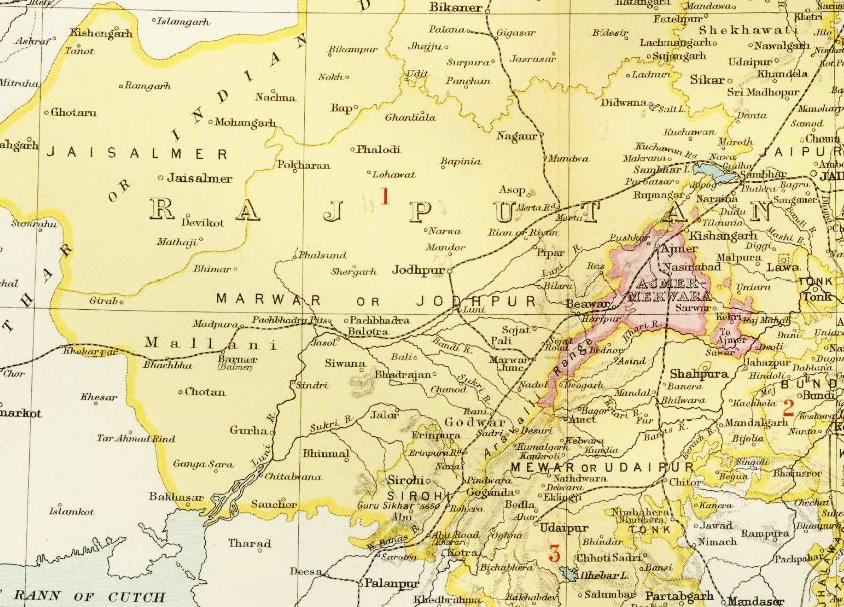
Map showing Rail link from Jodhpur to Singh, Imperial Gazetteer of India 1909.

During British rule, in 1892, the Hyderabad–Jodhpur Railway constructed the Jodhpur–Hyderabad mainline within two sections. The first section was Luni–Shadipalli section, which was a metre-gauge section line and the second section was Shadipalli–Hyderabad section, which was originally constructed as a 1,676 mm (5 ft 6 in) broad-gauge railway section line but due to less passenger transportation on that time it was converted to 1,000 mm (3 ft 3 3/8 in) metre gauge in the year 1901 and joined the first section of the mainline.

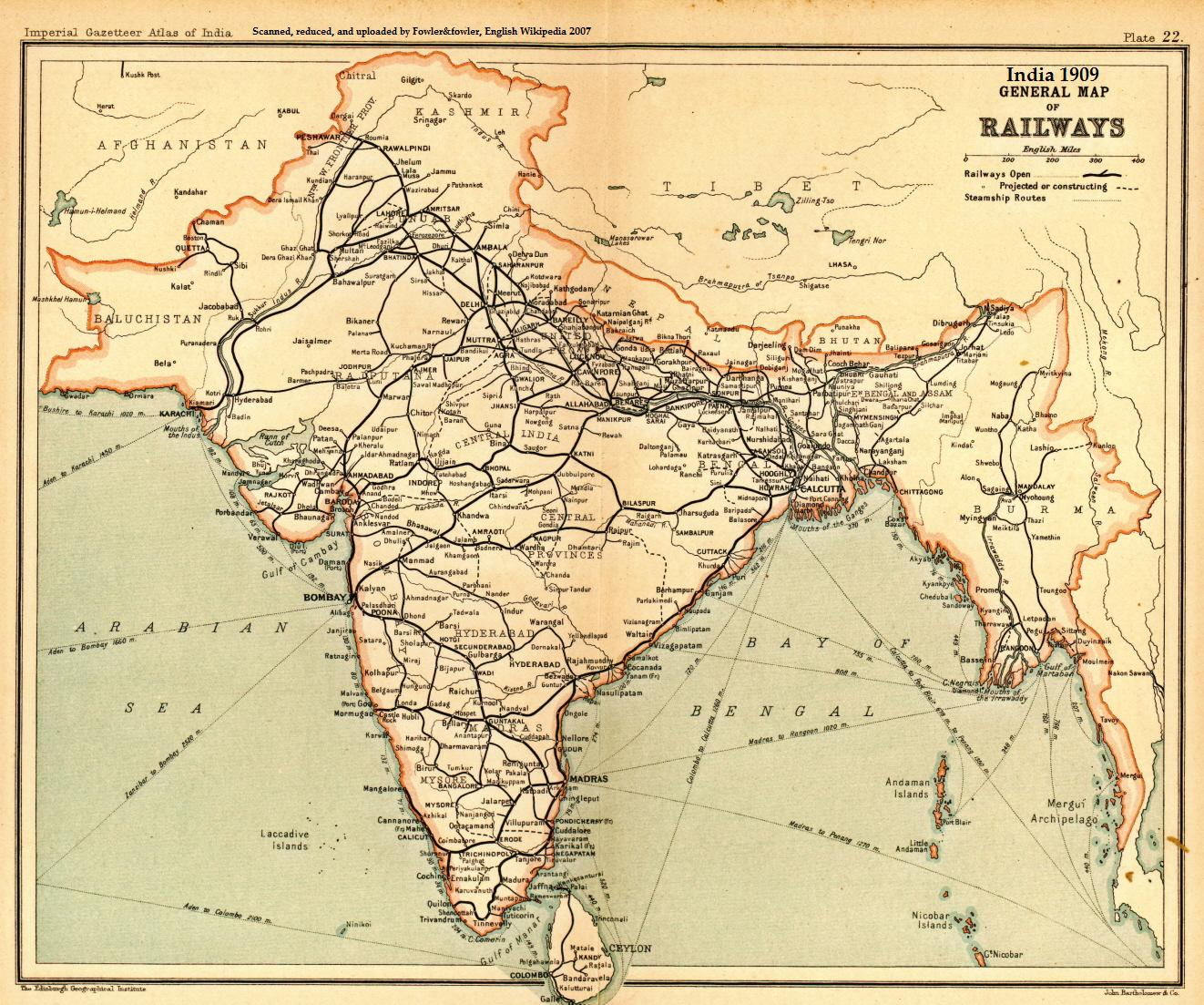
Extent of Indian railway network in 1909

During the year 1901, the Sind Mail started running between Bombay (now Mumbai) and Karachi, the route of this train passed through Ahmedabad–Palanpur-Marwar-Pali-Luni–Munabao-Khokhrapar-Mirpur Khas and Hyderabad continued operation till 1947. After the Partition of India the rail links of Jodhpur State and Northern Bombay Presidency was disrupted, and divided into the Indian State of Rajasthan and Pakistan province of Sindh. Due to this, the mainline was separated as Jodhpur–Munabao line from the Indian side and Khokhrapar–Hyderabad line as of Pakistan side, on this purpose the origin of Sind Mail were shifted to Jodhpur in India and Hyderabad in Pakistan continued operation between two countries Until 1965, when the outbreak of the Indo-Pakistani War of 1965 led to the closure of all passenger train links. During that time, the rail track was bombed and destroyed by the Pakistani fighter jets, and the Bombay–Karachi train ended.

On 28 June 1976, India and Pakistan signed the rail communication agreement to normalize the relations between two nations after signing the Simla Agreement (2 July 1972) a few months after the end of Indo-Pakistani War of 1971, when the bilateral relations had soured after the Indian Army had succeeded in liberating Bangladesh. This agreement forms the basis of running Samjhauta Express also the Delhi–Lahore Bus and Srinagar–Muzaffarabad Bus are based on a separate agreement.

On the Indian side, the Jodhpur–Munabao line was totally converted into 1,676 mm (5 ft 6 in) broad gauge in the year 2003 and the Indian immigration and customs office developed at Munabao railway station for customs checks which are currently carried out. Whereas on the Pakistan side, the Khokhrapar–Hyderabad line was totally re-converted back to the original 1,676 mm (5 ft 6 in) broad gauge and also the Zero Point railway station was also developed in the year 2006, a few hundred meters from the border, where immigration and customs checks are currently carried out. This enabled both the nations to sign an MoU to reopen the rail link. This was not possible earlier because there would be a change of gauge in between, either at Hyderabad or Mirpur Khas. Prior to 1965, the last Pakistani station was Khokhropar, about 10 kilometers from the border.

After gauge conversion of both nations, on 18 February 2006, the rail service of Thar Express was inaugurated on the basis of Simla Agreement and became the second route for connecting both nations after Samjhauta Express also the renewable rail communication agreement was regularly extended by both nations and the last extension was from 19 January 2016 to 18 January 2019.

== Route and operations ==
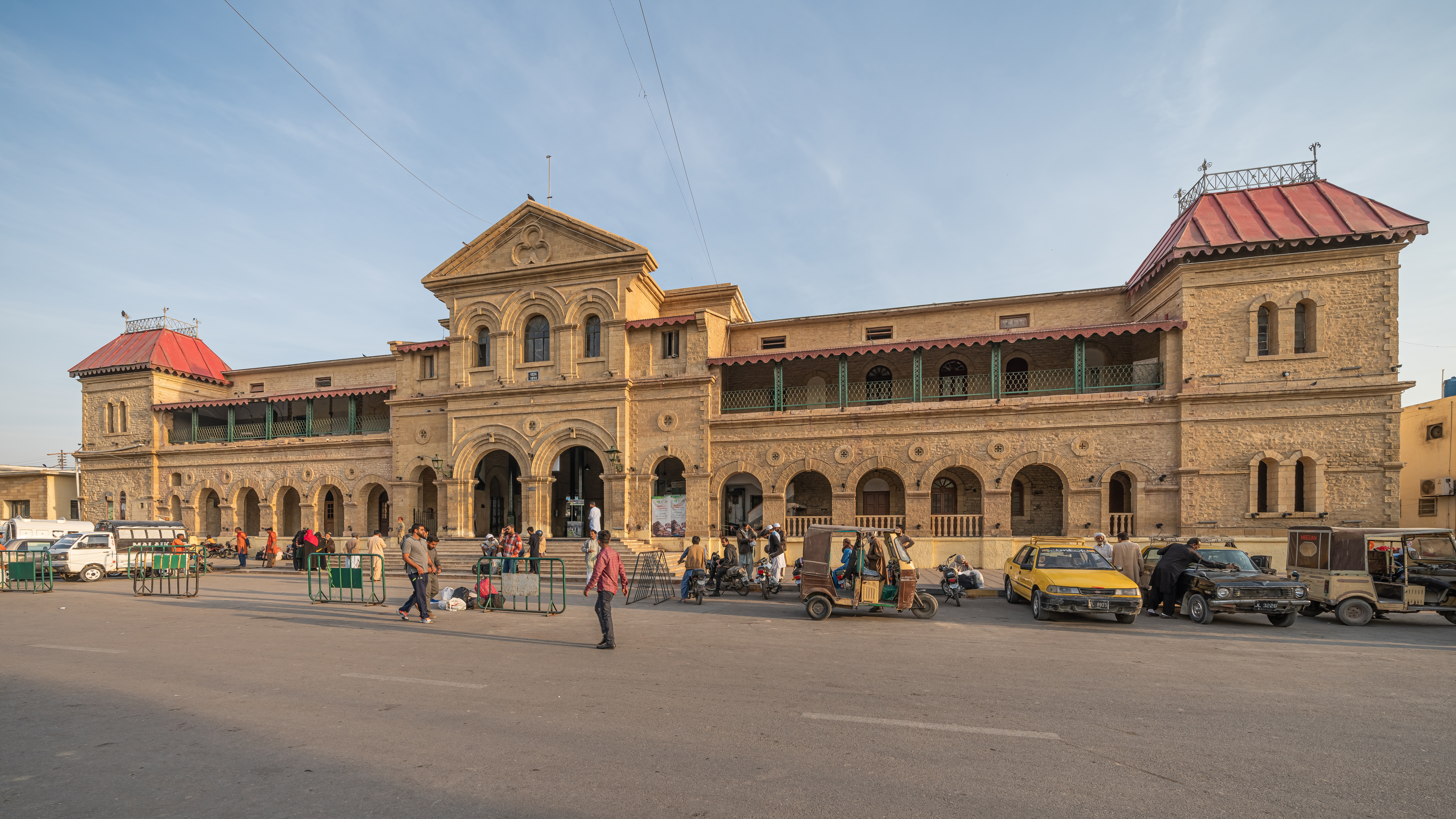
Karachi Cantonment railway station, the destination point of the train, where return journey begins.

Thar Express runs weekly with two portions. It travels totally around 709 km (441 mi) to reach Karachi from Jodhpur with a total average time of 23 hours 5 minutes to cover the entire stretch of Jodhpur−Munabao–Zero Point–Khokhrapar–Hyderabad–Karachi. The entire stretch is covered by broad-gauge diesel locomotives. There are only one major river crossing, the more than 100 year old Kotri Bridge over the Indus River. this river crossing occurs in Pakistan.

In this, the first portion of the Thar Express running on the Indian side (known as the Thar Link Express) is operated by Jodhpur railway division of the North Western Railway zone of Indian Railways from Bhagat Ki Kothi (Jodhpur) through Munabao to Zero Point with the rakes of ICF coach of Indian Railways and locomotive for an end to end journey in both directions with the following combination, L-SLR-S1-S2-S3-S4-S5-S6-S7-SLR (L – locomotive, SLR Seating cum luggage rake, S – Seating rake).

Similarly, the second portion of the Thar Express runs at the Pakistan side from Zero Point through Hyderabad Junction to Karachi Cantonment with the rakes of Pakistan Railways and locomotive for an end to end journey in both directions with the same combination.

=== Train schedule ===
Train departures are as follows:

Route	Section	Day	Train no.	Rake
Jodhpur to Karachi	Bhagat Ki Kothi (Jodhpur) to Zero Point	Saturday	14889	IR
Jodhpur to Karachi	Zero Point to Karachi Cantonment	Saturday	406	PR
Karachi to Jodhpur	Karachi Cantonment to Zero Point	Friday	405	PR
Karachi to Jodhpur	Zero Point to Bhagat Ki Kothi (Jodhpur)	Saturday	14890	IR

This train service is reliable and the Indian portion of train begins its journey from Bhagat Ki Kothi (Jodhpur) with time at 01:00 AM IST covers the distance of 325 km (202 mi) without any halts, it reaches Munabao at 07:00 AM IST for Indian immigration and customs checks, thereafter leaving the station covers the distance of 3 km (1.9 mi) with crossing India–Pakistan border and reaches Zero Point at 02:00 PM PKT for Pakistan immigration and customs checks. During that time the Pakistan portion train arrives on the station for boarding the passengers and leaves at 05:00 PM PKT covers the distance of 202 km (126 mi) with halts at Mirpur Khas Junction and Hyderabad Junction reaches Karachi Cantonment at 12:45 AM PKT.

Similarly, on returning the Pakistan portion of train begins its journey from Karachi Cantonment with time at 11:45 PM PKT with halts at Hyderabad Junction and Mirpur Khas Junction reaches Zero Point at 07:20 AM PKT for Pakistan immigration and customs checks. During that time the Indian portion train arrives on the station for boarding the passengers and leaves at 12:00 PM PKT crosses India–Pakistan border and reaches Munabao for Indian Immigration and customs checks, thereafter it leaves at 07:00 PM IST without any halts reaches Bhagat Ki Kothi (Jodhpur) at 11:50 PM IST.

== Stations ==
- Bhagat Ki Kothi (Jodhpur)
- Munabao
- Zero Point
- Mirpur Khas
- Hyderabad Junction
- Karachi Cantonment
