= Khathar railway station =

Railway station in Pakistan

Coordinates: 25.24292°N 68.444971°E

Khathar Railway Station کھاتر ریلوے اسٹیشن کٿڙ ريلوي اسٽيشن

General information
- Owner: Ministry of Railways
- Line: Hyderabad–Badin Branch Line

Other information
- Station code: KHZ

Services
Preceding station	Pakistan Railways	Following station
Zeal Pak towards Kotri Junction	Hyderabad–Badin Branch Line	Norai Sharif towards Badin
Location

Khathar Railway Station (Urdu: کھاتر ریلوے اسٹیشن, Sindhi: کٿڙ ريلوي اسٽيشن) is located in Sindh, Pakistan.

== See also ==
- List of railway stations in Pakistan
- Pakistan Railways
