= Matli railway station =

Railway station in Pakistan

Matli Railway Station ماتلی ریلوے اسٹیشن ماتلي ريلوي اسٽيشن

General information
- Coordinates: 25.0374°N 68.6543°E
- Owner: Ministry of Railways
- Line: Hyderabad–Badin Branch Line

Other information
- Station code: MTX

Services
Preceding station	Pakistan Railways	Following station
Tando Muhammad Khan towards Kotri Junction	Hyderabad–Badin Branch Line	Palh towards Badin
Location

Matli Railway Station (Urdu: ماتلی ریلوے اسٹیشن, Sindhi: ماتلي ريلوي اسٽيشن) is situated at Matli which is a town and capital of Matli Taluka in Badin District in the Sindh province of Pakistan.

== See also ==
- List of railway stations in Pakistan
- Pakistan Railways
