= Bucheri railway station =

Railway station in Pakistan

Buchheri Railway Station بُھچھيری ریلوے اسٹیشن بڇيري ريلوي اسٽيشن

General information
- Coordinates: 26.3537°N 68.3656°E
- Owner: Ministry of Railways
- Line: Karachi–Peshawar Railway Line

Other information
- Station code: BCR

History
- Opened: 1915

Services
Preceding station	Pakistan Railways	Following station
Nawabshah towards Kiamari	Karachi–Peshawar Line	Daur towards Peshawar Cantonment
Location

Buchheri railway station (Urdu: بُھچھيری ریلوے اسٹیشن, Sindhi: بڇيري ريلوي اسٽيش) is in Buchheri, a small town in sub-district Daur, Shaheed Benazir Abad district Sindh province of Pakistan. In 2015, Buchheri has been declared town committee. Baalu Ja Qubba is located in Buchheri, where father and mother of former president of Pakistan Asif Ali Zardari are buried in the graveyard of Baalu Ja Qubba (Tomb of Baalu). Dr. Ghulam Mustafa Abbasi, former Director General Health Government of Sindh is also from a small village Allah Bux near Buchheri.

== See also ==
- List of railway stations in Pakistan
- Pakistan Railways
