= Tando Muhammad Khan railway station =

Railway station in Pakistan

Tando Muhammad Khan Station ٹنڈو محمد خان ریلوے اسٹیشن ٽنڊو محمد خان ريلوي اسٽيشن

General information
- Coordinates: 25.1226°N 68.5299°E
- Owner: Ministry of Railways
- Line: Hyderabad–Badin Branch Line

Other information
- Station code: TMN

Services
| Preceding station | Pakistan Railways | Following station |
|---|---|---|
| Norai Sharif towards Kotri Junction | Hyderabad–Badin Branch Line | Matli towards Badin |
Location

Tando Muhammad Khan Railway Station (Urdu: ٹنڈو محمد خان ریلوے اسٹیشن, Sindhi: ٽنڊو محمد خان ريلوي اسٽيشن) is located at Tando Muhammad Khan, Sindh, Pakistan.

== See also ==
- List of railway stations in Pakistan
- Pakistan Railways
