= Tando Allahyar railway station =

Railway station in Pakistan

Tando Allahyar Station ٹنڈو اللہ یار ریلوے اسٹیشن ٽنڊو الهيار ريلوي اسٽيشن

General information
- Coordinates: 25.4697°N 68.7256°E
- Owner: Ministry of Railways
- Line: Hyderabad–Khokhrapar Branch Line

Other information
- Station code: TDA

Services
Preceding station	Pakistan Railways	Following station
Rashidabad Halt towards Kotri Junction	Hyderabad–Khokhrapar Branch Line	Sultanabad towards Zero Point
Location

Tando Allahyar Railway Station (Urdu: ٹنڈو اللہ یار ریلوے اسٹیشن, Sindhi: ٽنڊو الهيار ریلوي اسٽیشن) is located in Tando Allahyar, Sindh, Pakistan.

== See also ==
- List of railway stations in Pakistan
- Pakistan Railways
