= Munabao =

- Village
- Location in Rajasthan, India Munabao (India)
- Coordinates: 25.75°N 70.2833°E
- Country: India
- State: Rajasthan
- District: Barmer
- Talukas: Gadra Road
- Elevation: 71 m (233 ft)

Population (2001)
  - Total: 411

Languages
  - Official: Hindi, Rajasthani
- Time zone: UTC+5:30 (IST)
- ISO 3166 code: RJ-IN
- Lok Sabha constituency: Barmer
- Vidhan Sabha constituency: Sheo

Munabao is a bordering village, approx.124 km from Barmer city in Barmer district in the Indian state of Rajasthan. It borders Pakistan's Sindh province. It is a designated border crossing, where a daily beating retreat border ceremony is held.

== Geography ==
It is about 125 km from district headquarters Barmer city in the Barmer district. It is 177 km southwest of Jaisalmer, 660 km west of state capital Jaipur, and 931 km from national capital New Delhi. The Pakistani village of Khokhrapar is just across the border.

== Transport ==
Munabao is served by the Munabao railway station on Marwar Junction–Munabao line.

From 2006 to 2019, a train service used to run once-a-week between Bhagat Ki Kothi near Jodhpur and Karachi, Pakistan, passing through Munabao on India side, Zero Point border station, Khokhrapar on Pakistan side. This train was known as the Thar Express. It was the second active rail connection between India and Pakistan. Thar link express was extended for 3 years from 1 February 2018 to 31 January 2021, but as of 9 August 2019, the train was cancelled due to escalating tensions between India and Pakistan.

A passenger train runs between Munabao and Barmer.

== Munbao-Khokhrapar border ceremony ==
India and Pakistan jointly host a beating retreat flag ceremony every day at 6 pm which is open for the public. This ceremony is similar to the Wagah-Attari border ceremony held near Amritsar.

== In popular culture ==
The 2022 film Thar featuring Anil Kapoor was filmed there.

== See also ==
- Attari
- Hussainiwala
- India–Pakistan border
- Borders of India
- North Western Railway zone
