= Ratanabad railway station =

Railway station in Pakistan

Coordinates: 25.515994°N 68.954709°E

General information
- Owner: Ministry of Railways

Other information
- Station code: RAD

History
- Former names: Great Indian Peninsula Railway
Location

Ratanabad railway station (Urdu: رتنا آباد ریلوے اسٹیشن) is located in Pakistan.

== See also ==
- List of railway stations in Pakistan
- Pakistan Railways
