= Bhagat Ki Kothi =

Place in Rajasthan, India

Bhagat Ki Kothi is a place in Rajasthan, near Jodhpur. Bhagat Ki Kothi is famous for the Thar Express. This train connects India and Karachi, Pakistan. It is also famous for the Taj Hotel and the Lahariya Sweet Home.

Bhagat Ki Kothi is home to a major diesel locomotive shed. In railway communications it is abbreviated as BGKT.
