= Mirani railway station =

Railway station in Pakistan

Mirani railway station ميراڻي ريلوي اسٽيشن

General information
- Owner: Ministry of Railways

Other information
- Station code: MRNI

History
- Former names: Great Indian Peninsula Railway
Location

Mirani railway station (Urdu: میرانی ریلوے اسٹیشن, Sindhi: ميراڻي ريلوي اسٽيشن) is located in Pakistan.

== See also ==
- List of railway stations in Pakistan
- Pakistan Railways
