= Husri railway station =

Railway station in Sindh, Pakistan

Coordinates: 25.315404°N 68.411169°E

Husri railway station هوسڙي ريلوي اسٽيشن

General information
- Owner: Ministry of Railways

Other information
- Station code: HSE

History
- Former names: Great Indian Peninsula Railway
Location

Husri railway station (Urdu: ہوسری ریلوے اسٹیشن, Sindhi: هوسڙي ريلوي اسٽيشن) is in Sindh, Pakistan.

== See also ==
- List of railway stations in Pakistan
- Pakistan Railways
