= Kamaro Sharif railway station =

Railway station in Pakistan

Coordinates: 25.485358°N 68.80138°E

General information
- Owner: Ministry of Railways

Other information
- Station code: KMOS

History
- Former names: Great Indian Peninsula Railway
Location

Kamaro Sharif railway station (Urdu: کامارو شریف ریلوے اسٹیشن) is located in Pakistan.

== See also ==
- List of railway stations in Pakistan
- Pakistan Railways
