= India–Pakistan border =

International border

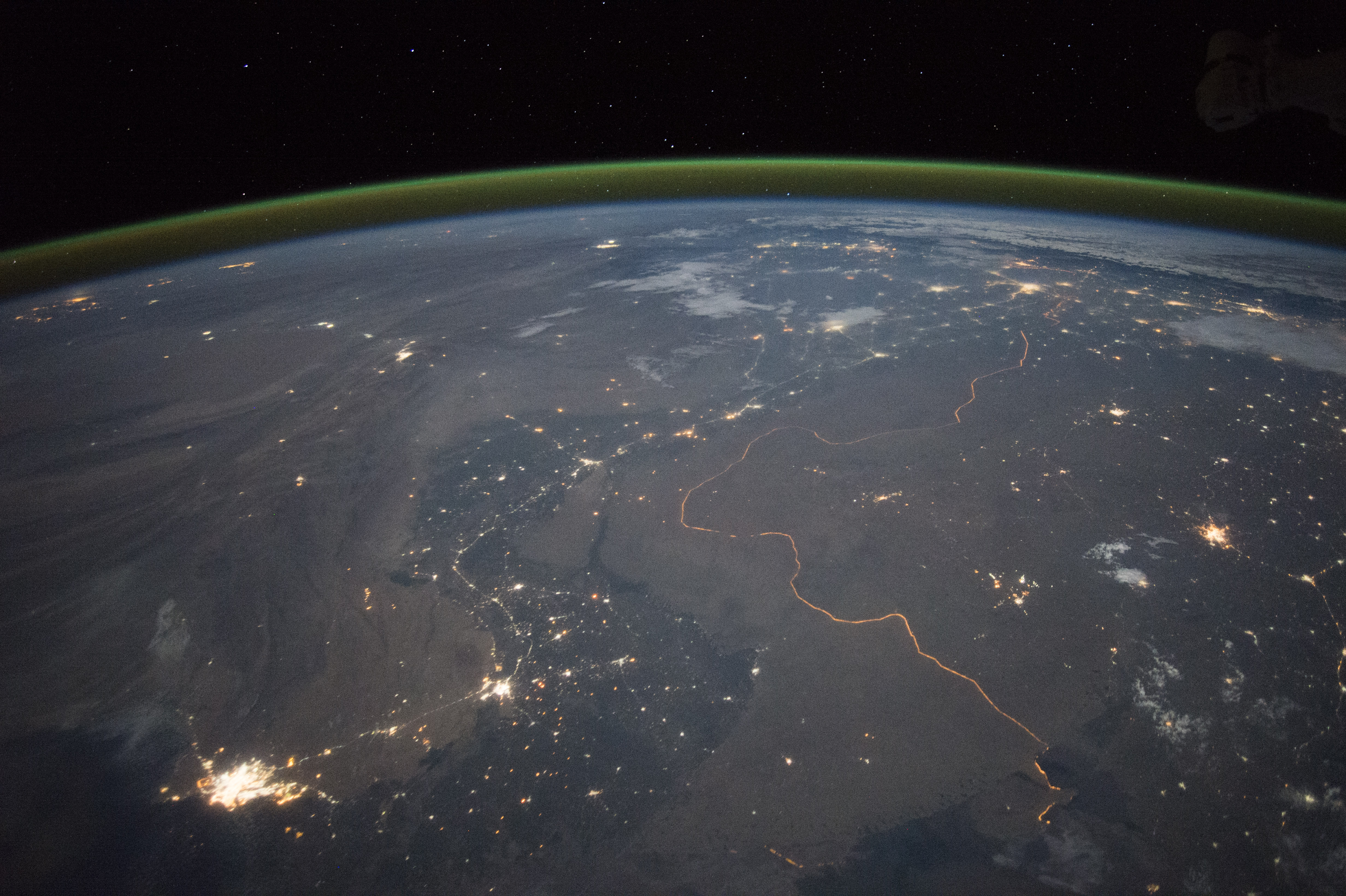
- Nighttime panorama from outer space showing the border's span from the Arabian Sea to the foothills of the Himalayas

Characteristics
- Entities: India; Pakistan
- Length: 3,323 kilometres (2,065 mi)

History
- Established: 17 August 1947; Partition of India
- Current shape: 2 July 1972; Demarcation of the Line of Control post-ratification of the Shimla Agreement
- Treaties: Karachi Agreement (1949), Shimla Agreement (1972)
- Notes: The Line of Control divides Kashmir between India and Pakistan—it is not a part of the internationally recognized section of the border due to the Kashmir conflict

The India–Pakistan border is the international boundary that separates the nations of the Republic of India and the Islamic Republic of Pakistan. At its northern end is the Line of Control, which separates Indian-administered Jammu & Kashmir and Ladakh from Pakistani-administered Azad Kashmir and Gilgit-Baltistan; and at its southern end is Sir Creek, a tidal estuary in the Rann of Kutch between the Indian state of Gujarat and the Pakistani province of Sindh.

Arising from the partition of India in 1947, the border covers the provincial boundaries of Gujarat and Rajasthan with Sindh, and the Radcliffe Line between the partitions of Punjab. It traverses a variety of terrain in the northwestern region of the subcontinent, ranging from major urban areas to inhospitable deserts. Since the beginning of the India–Pakistan conflict shortly after the two countries' conjoined independence, it has been the site of numerous cross-border military standoffs and full-scale wars. The border's total length is 3,323 kilometres (2,065 mi) according to figures given by PBS; it is also ranked as one of the most dangerous international boundaries in the world, based on an article written in Foreign Policy in 2011. During the nighttime, the India–Pakistan border is distinctly visible from outer space due to the 150,000 floodlights installed by India on approximately 50,000 poles.

== Sections ==
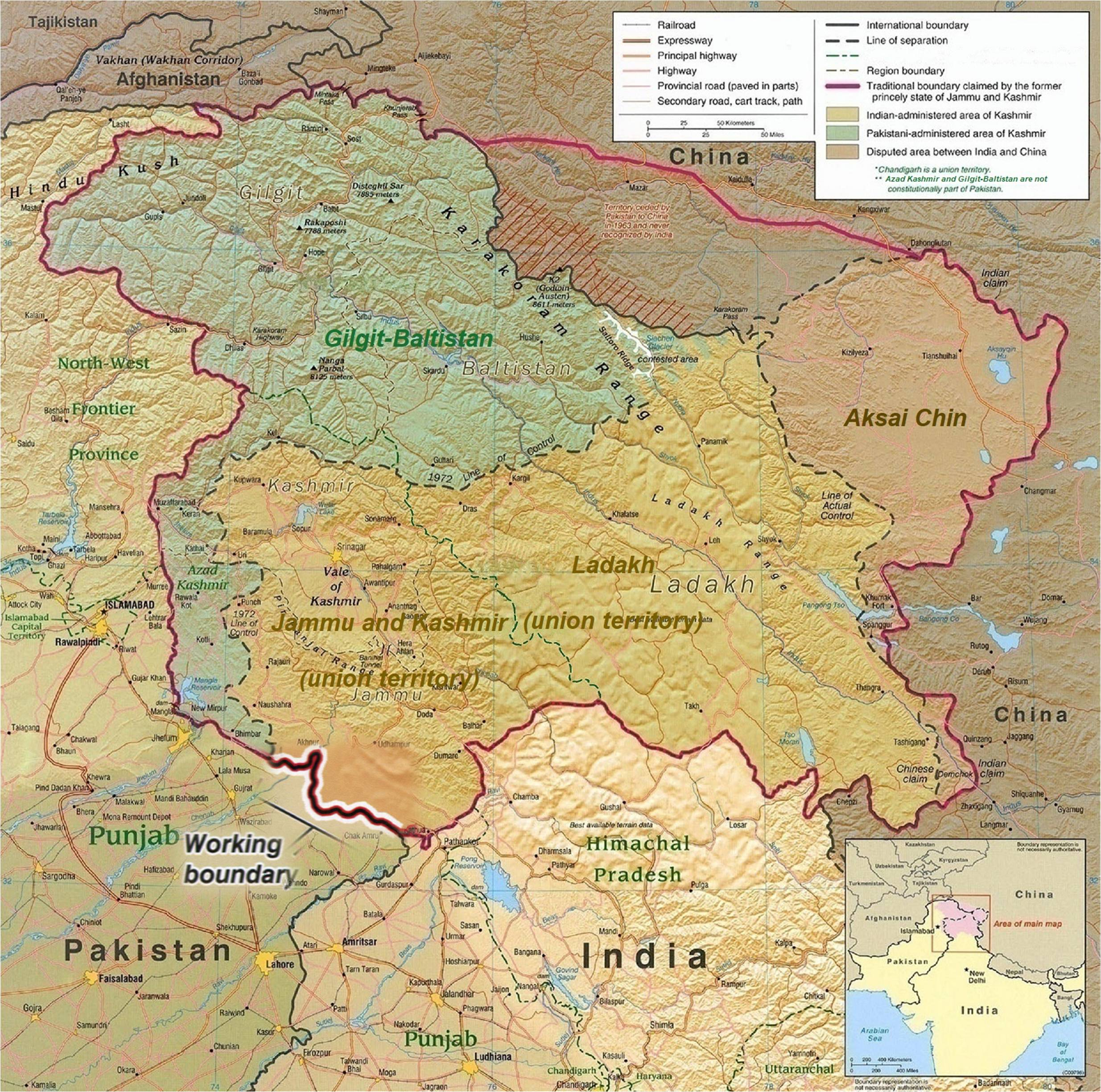
Map of the Kashmir region showing the Line of Control (LoC) and the Working Boundary between India and Pakistan

The India-Pakistan border includes mutually-recognised International Border and several disputed sections, listed from north to south:

1. Actual Ground Position Line (AGPL) - separates the current positions of Indian and Pakistani military posts and troops along the 110 kilometres (68 mi) long frontline in the disputed region of Siachen Glacier: It runs along the Saltoro Mountains range, beginning from the northernmost point of the (LOC) at Point NJ 9842 and ending in the north on the Indira Ridge at the India-China-Pakistan LAC tripoint near Sia Kangri about 4 km (2.5 mi) northwest of Indira Col West, with peaks in excess of 7,000 m (23,000 ft) and temperatures ranging to around −55 °C (−67 °F). India gained control of 1,000 square miles (2,600 km^{2}) of disputed territory in 1984 because of its military operations in Siachen.
2. Line of Control (LoC) - separates disputed areas of Indian-administered Ladakh and Jammu and Kashmir UT from Pakistani-administered Kashmir: It was demarcated after the 1972 Simla Agreement. Earlier the UN-mediated ceasefire line of 1949 served as the de facto border between the two regions after the Indo-Pakistani War of 1947, which was revised to a Line of Control after the Indo-Pakistani War of 1971.
3. Working Boundary (WB) - separates the disputed section of Indian-administered Jammu and Kashmir from the Pakistani Punjab: It is referred to as a working boundary by the United Nations (UN), while India regards it as the international border. Pakistani Punjab is internationally recognized as a part of Pakistan by both parties while Jammu and Kashmir is a disputed territory (claimed by Pakistan, controlled by India).
4. International Boundary (IB) or Radcliffe Line - runs from Punjab to Gujarat and Sindh: The demarcated line between India and Pakistan is recognized by both nations.
5. Sir Creek - separates southern Gujarat in India from southern Sindh in Pakistan: The long-standing India-Pakistan Sir Creek border dispute stems from the demarcation "from the mouth of Sir Creek to the top of Sir Creek, and from the top of Sir Creek eastward to a point on the line designated on the Western Terminus". From this point onward, the boundary is unambiguously fixed as defined by the Tribunal Award of 1968.

== Barrier ==
Out of total 3,323 kilometres (2,065 mi) length of border with Pakistan, Government of India has completely fenced 2,064 kilometres (1,283 mi) by 2024 and the remaining 916 kilometres (569 mi) is covered by physical and non-physical barriers as it is not feasible to fence the entire border due to densely forested rugged mountains, riverine and marshy areas. India has similar fence on borders with Bangladesh and Myanmar.

In February 2025, India's Central Public Works Department (CPWD) started to construct a 1,450 km long border road along the border barrier across the Indian Punjab (354 km) and Rajasthan (1096 km). This will enable swifter access, strengthen the anti-drug and anti-terrorism patrolling, and act as an anti-tunnel mechanism.

== Border crossings ==
- Border crossings with designated immigration and customs facilities are:
  - Attari and Wagah is the most famous and prominent, due to the Attari–Wagah border ceremony. The crossing is located 32 kilometres from Amritsar and 24 kilometers from Lahore. It has shut down indefinitely on May 1, 2025 after the 2025 Pahalgam terrorist attack and Operation SINDOOR
  - Kartarpur Corridor is the newest border crossing. While currently it only serves pilgrims from India to Gurdwara Darbar Sahib Kartarpur with a valid Electronic Travel Authorisation, it has designated immigration and customs facilities. It has been shut down on May 1, 2025 after the 2025 Pahalgam terrorist attack and Operation SINDOOR but the Pakistani side is still open.
  - Munabao, a village in Barmer district, Rajasthan, has a railway station through which the Thar Express connects India with Pakistan. The crossing point had been closed after the Indo-Pakistani War of 1965. It reopened in 2006 but closed again in 2019.
- Other crossings
  - Ganda Singh Wala border, Kasur District (Pakistan side) / Hussainiwala border, Punjab (India side)
  - Sulaimanki, Punjab (Pakistan side) / Fazilka border, Fazilka district, Punjab (India side)
  - Longewala (closed)

== Border ceremonies ==
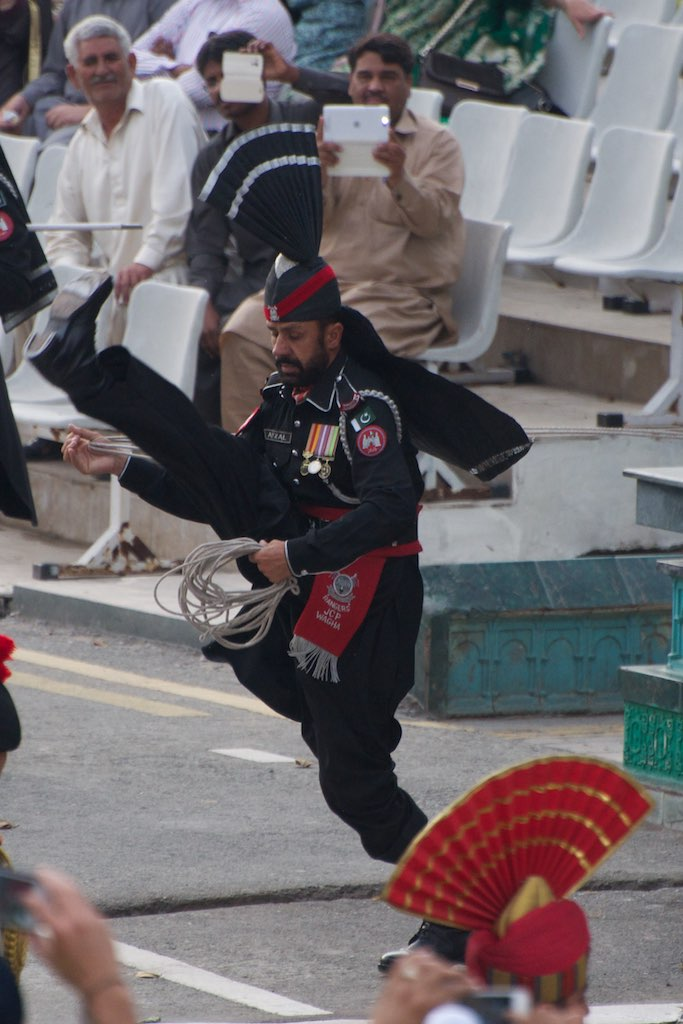
Wagah border ceremony, 2015.

At the following border crossing sites and the beating retreat flag ceremonies are jointly held by the military of both nations every day at 6:30 pm, which are open to public as tourist attractions. No special permit or ticket is needed. The ceremony sites are as follows (from north to south):

- Punjab, India – Punjab, Pakistan
  - Attari–Wagah border ceremony near Amritsar in Punjab: The flag lowering ceremony at the village of Wagah is held each evening immediately before sunset by the border agents of Pakistan (Pakistan Rangers) and India (Border Security Force or BSF). The ceremony begins with battle calls from both sides in the form of loud screaming done by the border guards. This is followed by a series of organized high kicks, stomps, and dance moves during which the opposing forces stare each other down. The event ends with a handshake of good faith being exchanged by the head guards along with the lowering of the flags. It is symbolic of the brotherhood as well as the rivalry that these two nations share. The border troops are known to exchange sweets with the opposing side during the Muslim holidays of Eid and Hindu holiday of Diwali. It has been a peaceful gathering with the exception of the 2014 Wagah border suicide attack by Islamist terrorists in which 60 people were killed and over 110 people were left injured. The border ceremony was temporarily suspended after the Pahalgam terror attack in April 2025, but resumed in an altered form on 20 May 2025.
  - Hussainiwala–Ganda Singh Wala border ceremony near Firozepur in Punjab.
  - Sadiqui–Sulemanki border ceremony near Fazilka in Punjab.
- Rajasthan – Sindh
  - Munabao–Khokhrapar border ceremony in Barmer district in Rajasthan.

== Gallery ==
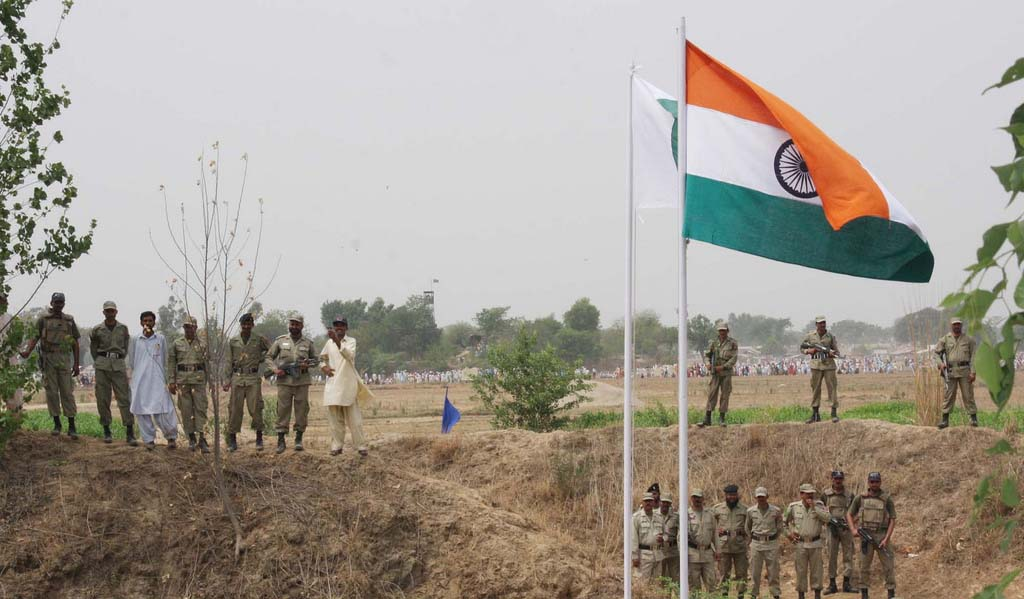
"Baba Chamliyal Mela" traditional celebration at the India–Pakistan border near Ramgarh, 45 km (28 mi) from Jammu, where both Indians and Pakistanis take part in the festivities.

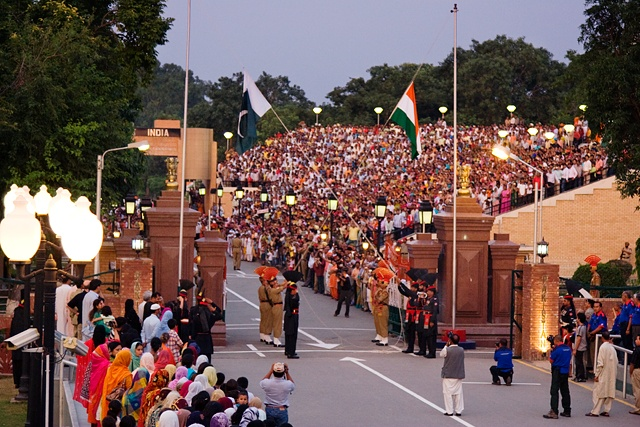
Evening Wagah–Attari border ceremony, as seen from the Pakistan side.

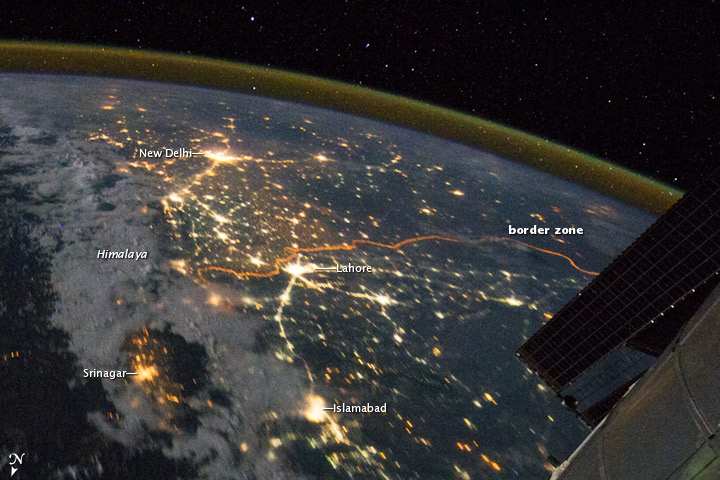
The floodlit border zone between Pakistan and India seen from outer space.

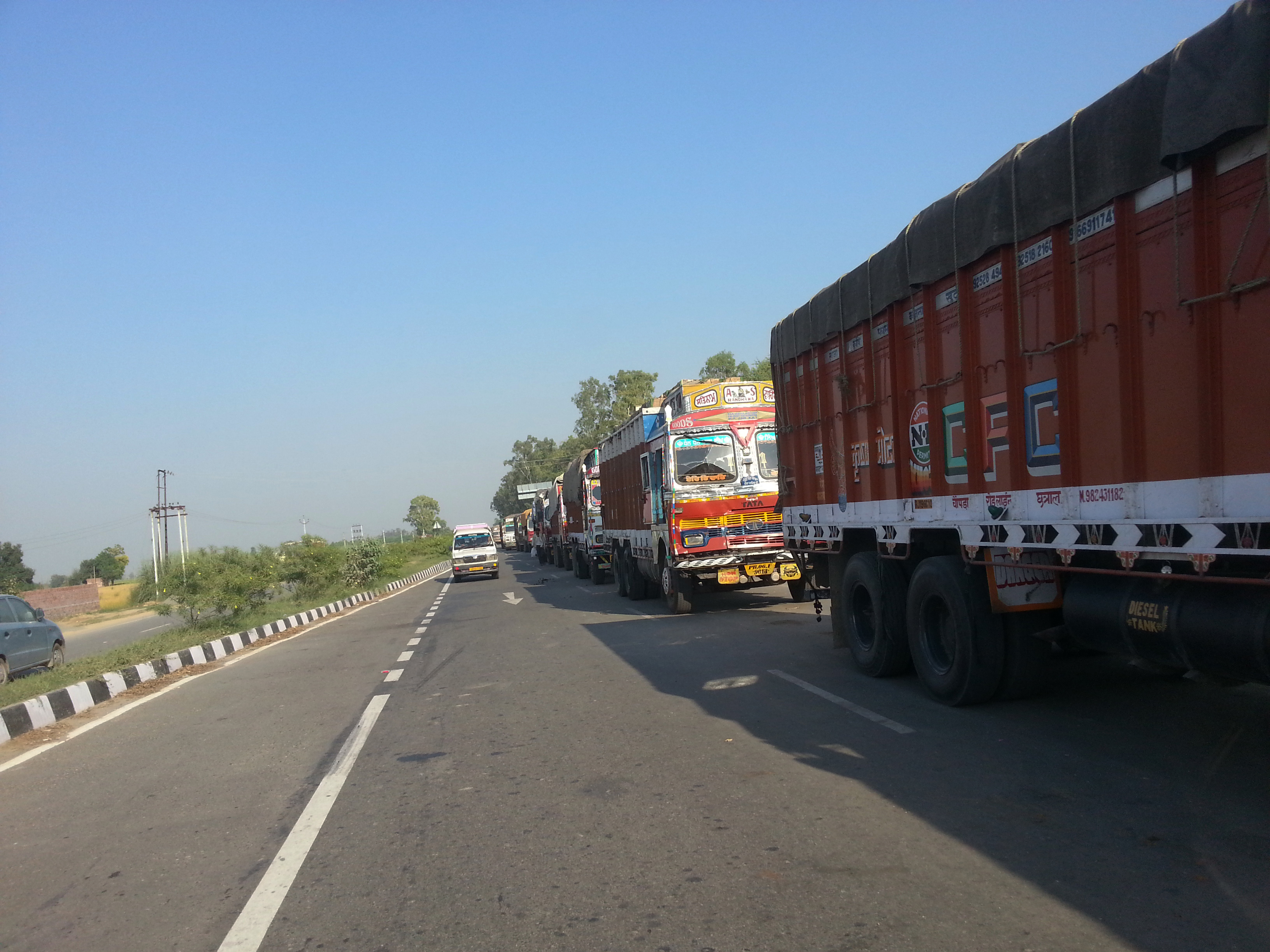
Trucks on the former Indian National Highway 1, waiting to cross the border at Wagah–Attari.

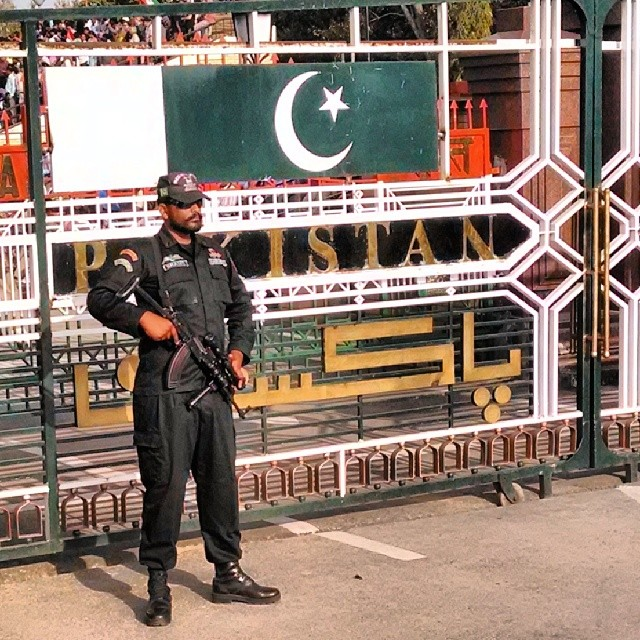
Pakistani Ranger standing guard at the Wagah border crossing.

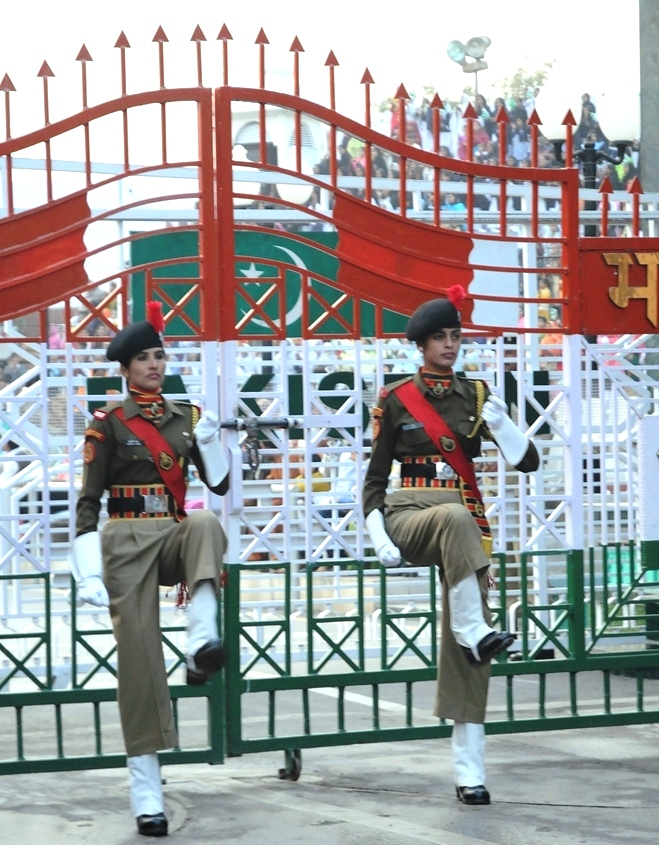
Female Indian Border Security Force personnel taking part in the ceremonial retreat at the India–Pakistan border crossing (Wagah–Attari), 2010.

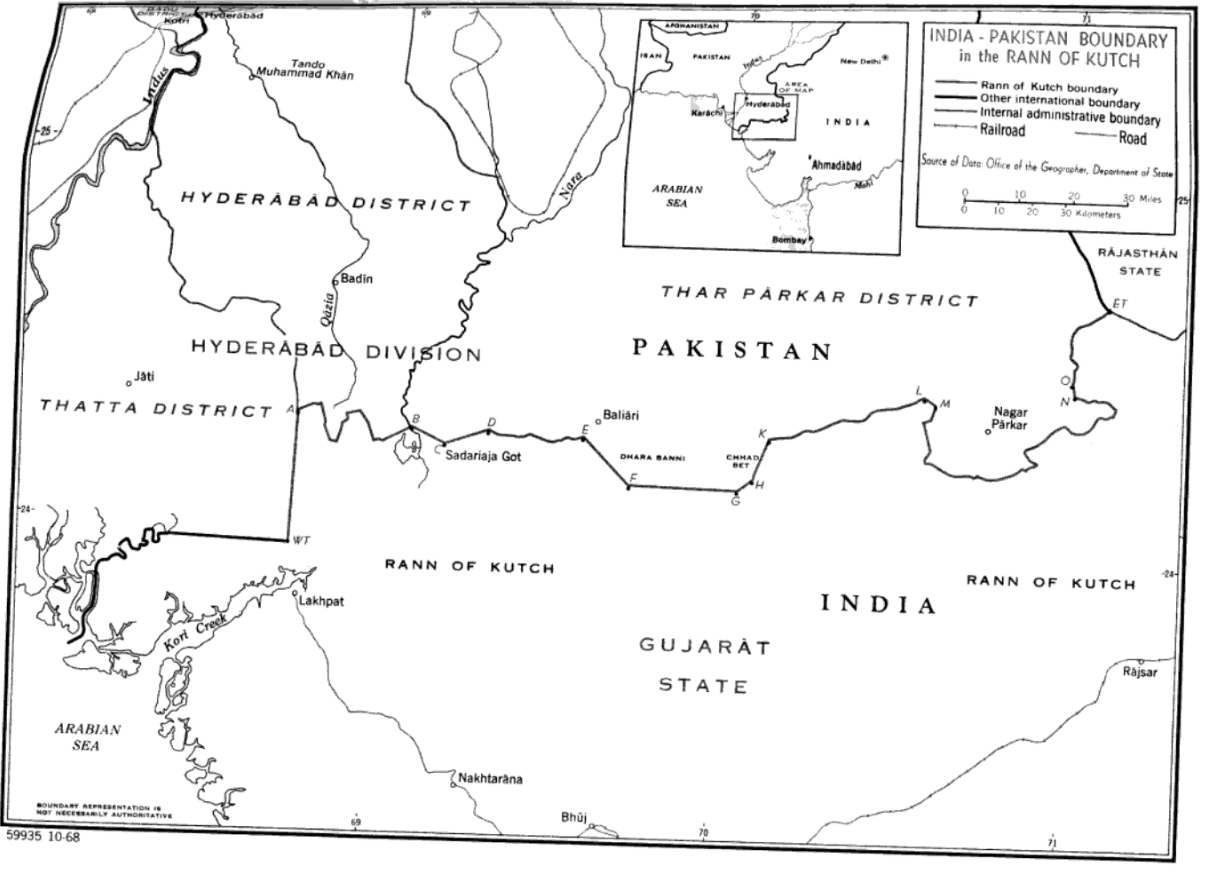
Map of the India–Pakistan border along the Rann of Kutch between Gujarat, India and Sindh, Pakistan.

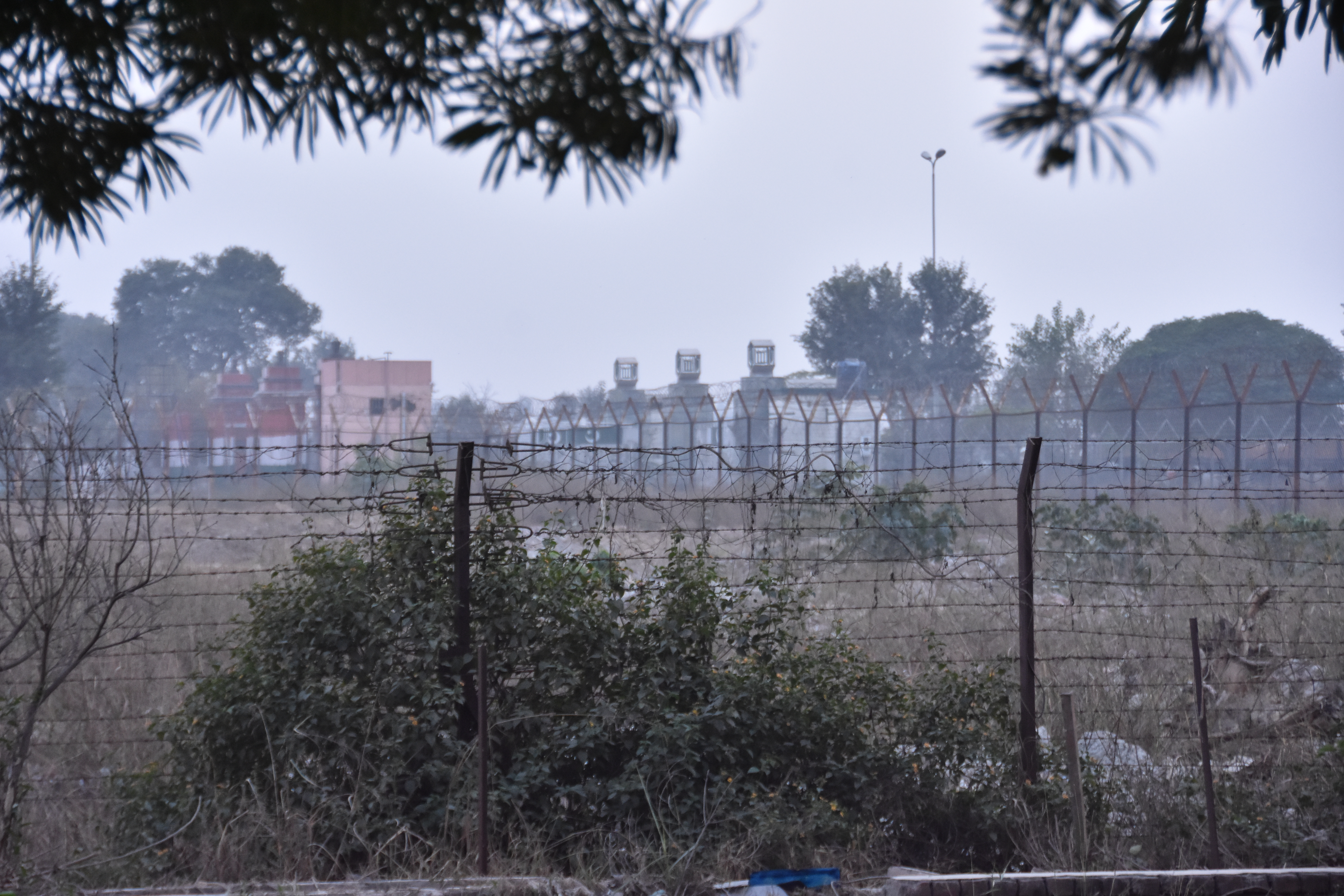
India-Pakistan border at Wagah, 2017

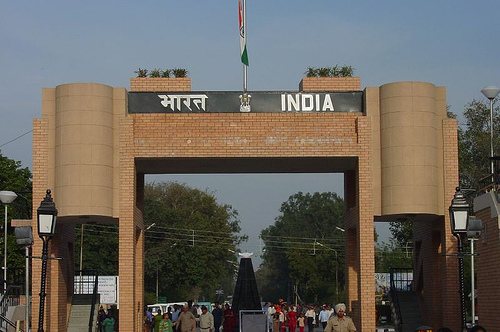
India gate in Wagah/Attari

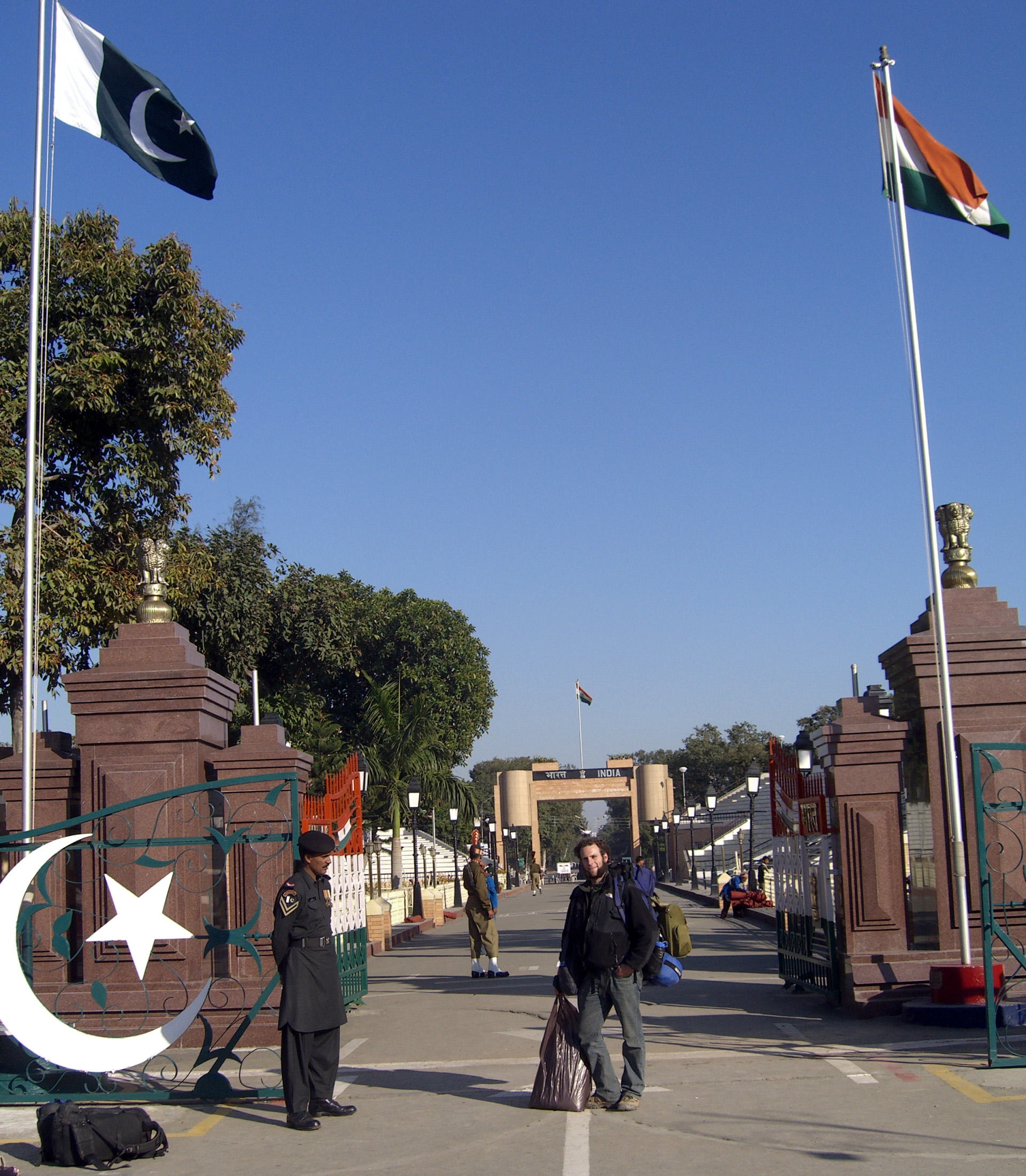
A tourist in front of the Wagah border post, on the Pakistani side, looking towards Attari on the Indian side.

== See also ==
- Borders of India
- Borders of Pakistan
- Partition of India
  - Radcliffe Line
- India–Pakistan relations
- India–Pakistan border skirmishes
- India–Pakistan maritime trespassing
