= Talhar railway station =

Railway station in Pakistan

Talhar Railway Station تلہار ریلوے اسٹیشن تلهار ريلوي اسٽيشن
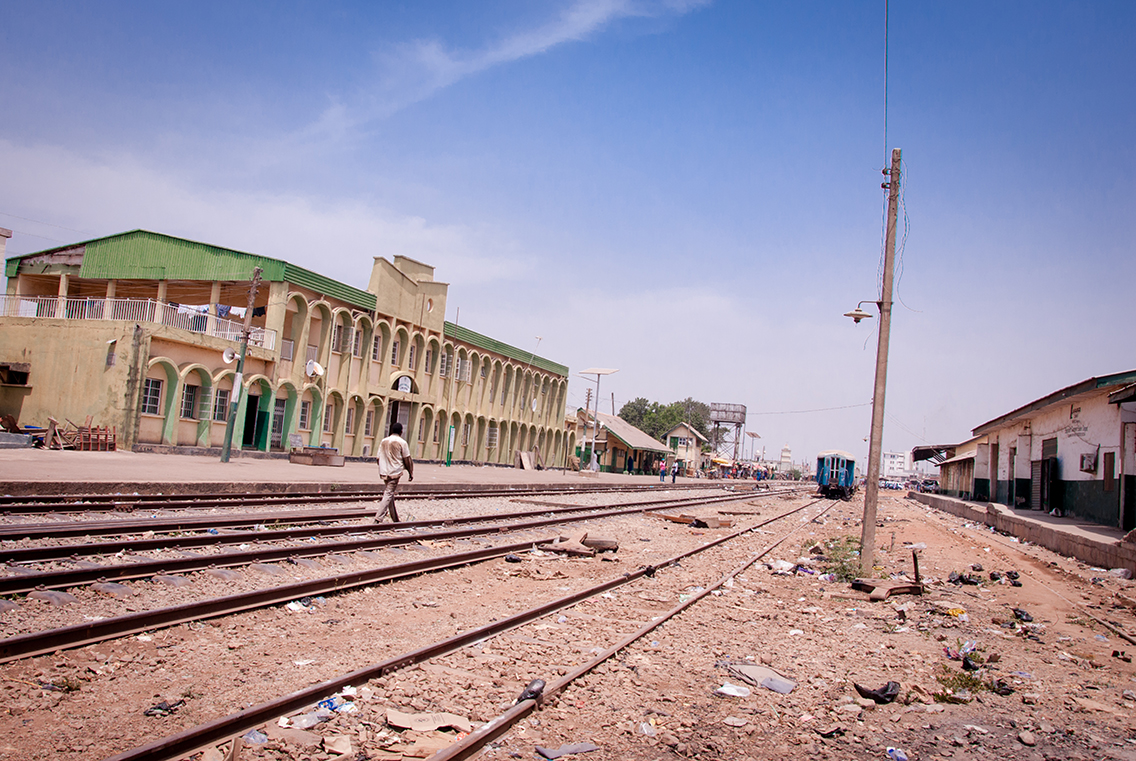
- The image of Talhar Railway station you've shared appears to be a replica, as Wikipedia typically doesn't host local images.

General information
- Location: Talhar Railway Station, Talhar, Badin, Sindh
- Coordinates: 24.8813°N 68.8144°E
- Owner: Ministry of Railways
- Line: Hyderabad–Badin Branch Line

Construction
- Structure type: At-grade
- Platform levels: One
- Parking: Available

Other information
- Station code: THRS
- Fare zone: Talhar

History
- Former names: Talhar Railway station

Passengers
- 2017: 50 (Offline)

Services
Preceding station	Pakistan Railways	Following station
Palh towards Kotri Junction	Hyderabad–Badin Branch Line	Badin Terminus
Location

Talhar Railway Station (Urdu: تلہار ریلوے اسٹیشن, Sindhi: تلهار ريلوي اسٽيشن) is located at Talhar Town of District Badin, Sindh, Pakistan. The Talhar Railway Station, a testament to the North Western State Railway's expansion program, proudly stands for over 119 years, predating Pakistan's existence by an impressive 43 years. Inaugurated on August 15, 1904, it served as a vital artery, connecting the people of Badin to major cities like Matli, Tando Muhammad Khan, and the divisional city of Hyderabad.

== See also ==
- List of railway stations in Pakistan
- Pakistan Railways
