= Rahuki railway station =

Railway station in Pakistan

Coordinates: 25.414424°N 68.473221°E

Rahuki railway station راهوڪي ريلوي اسٽيشن

General information
- Owner: Ministry of Railways

Other information
- Station code: RHK

History
- Former names: Great Indian Peninsula Railway
Location

Rahuki railway station (Urdu: راہوکی ریلوے اسٹیشن, Sindhi: راهوڪي ريلوي اسٽيشن) is an abandoned railway station located in Sindh, Pakistan near the city of Hyderabad.

== See also ==
- List of railway stations in Pakistan
- Pakistan Railways
