= Ganja Takkar railway station =

Railway station in Pakistan

Ganja Takkar railway station گنجو ٽڪر ريلوي اسٽيشن

General information
- Owner: Ministry of Railways

Other information
- Station code: GJT

History
- Former names: Great Indian Peninsula Railway

Ganja Takkar railway station (Urdu: گنجا ٹکر ریلوے اسٹیشن, Sindhi: گنجو ٽڪر ريلوي اسٽيشن) is located in Pakistan.

== See also ==
- List of railway stations in Pakistan
- Pakistan Railways
