= Yousaf Shah Halt railway station =

Railway in station Pakistan

General information
- Owner: Ministry of Railways

Other information
- Station code: YSF

History
- Former names: Great Indian Peninsula Railway

Yousaf Shah Halt railway station (Urdu: یوسف شاہ ہالٹ ریلوے اسٹیشن) is located in Pakistan.

== See also ==
- List of railway stations in Pakistan
- Pakistan Railways
