= Khokhropar =

Khohkhropar: کھوکھروپار; کوکروپار
- Border town
- Location within Pakistan
- Coordinates: 25°41′N 70°12′E
- Country: Pakistan
- Subdivision: Sindh
- District: Tharparkar
- Elevation: 71 m (233 ft)
- Time zone: UTC+5 (PST)

Khokhropar or Khokhrapar (Sindhi: کوکروپار; Urdu: کھوکھروپار [kʰoːkʰɾoːˈpaːɾ]) is a border town situated in Tharparkar District, Sindh, Pakistan. It is located at 25°41 North 70°12 East and has an altitude of 71 metres (233 ft).

== Railway ==
Khokhrapar railway station was established in 1916. Before the independence of Pakistan in 1947, the Sind Mail was run between Hyderabad, Pakistan and Ahmedabad, India via Mirpur Khas, Khokhrapar, Munabao, Barmer, Luni, Jodhpur, Pali, Marwar and Palanpur. After the independence Khokhrapar was the last railway station in Pakistan on Hyderabad, Pakistan - Jodhpur, India railway line and used for customs and immigration.

The train service between Hyderabad, Pakistan and Jodhpur, India closed down after the 1965 war. The town, and the rest of the Nagarparkar salient were captured by India in the 1971 war, and returned to Pakistan in 1972.

In February 2006 Mirpur Khas - Munabao railway line reopened after the conversion of metre gauge railway track to broad gauge. Now Zero Point railway station is the last station in Pakistan on this railway line for customs and immigration.
