= Badin railway station =

Railway station in Sindh, Pakistan

Badin Railway Station بدین ریلوے اسٹیشن بدين ريلوي اسٽيشن
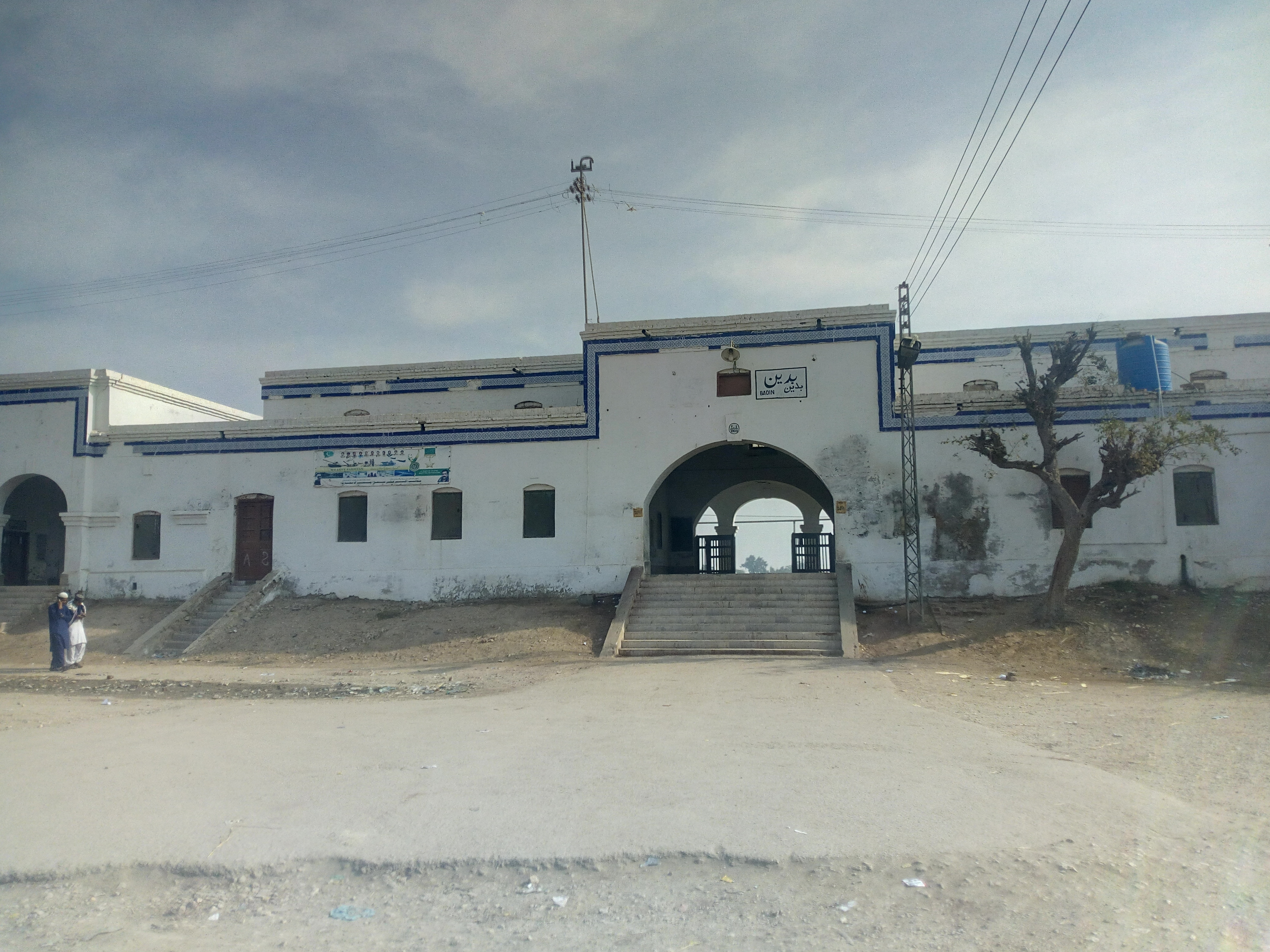

General information
- Coordinates: 24.6622°N 68.8384°E
- Owner: Ministry of Railways
- Line: Hyderabad–Badin Branch Line

Other information
- Station code: BDX

History
- Opened: 1908

Services
Preceding station	Pakistan Railways	Following station
Talhar towards Kotri Junction	Hyderabad–Badin Branch Line	Terminus
Location

Badin Railway Station (Urdu: بدین ریلوے اسٹیشن, Sindhi: بدين ريلوي اسٽيشن) is located at Badin, Sindh, Pakistan.

== Services ==
The following trains stop at Badin station:

Preceding station	Pakistan Railways	Following station
Talhar towards Hyderabad Junction	Badin Express	Terminus

== See also ==
- List of railway stations in Pakistan
- Pakistan Railways
