= Mirpur Khas railway station =

Railway station in Pakistan

Mirpur Khas Junction Station میرپور خاص ریلوے اسٹیشن ميرپور خاص ريلوي اسٽيشن
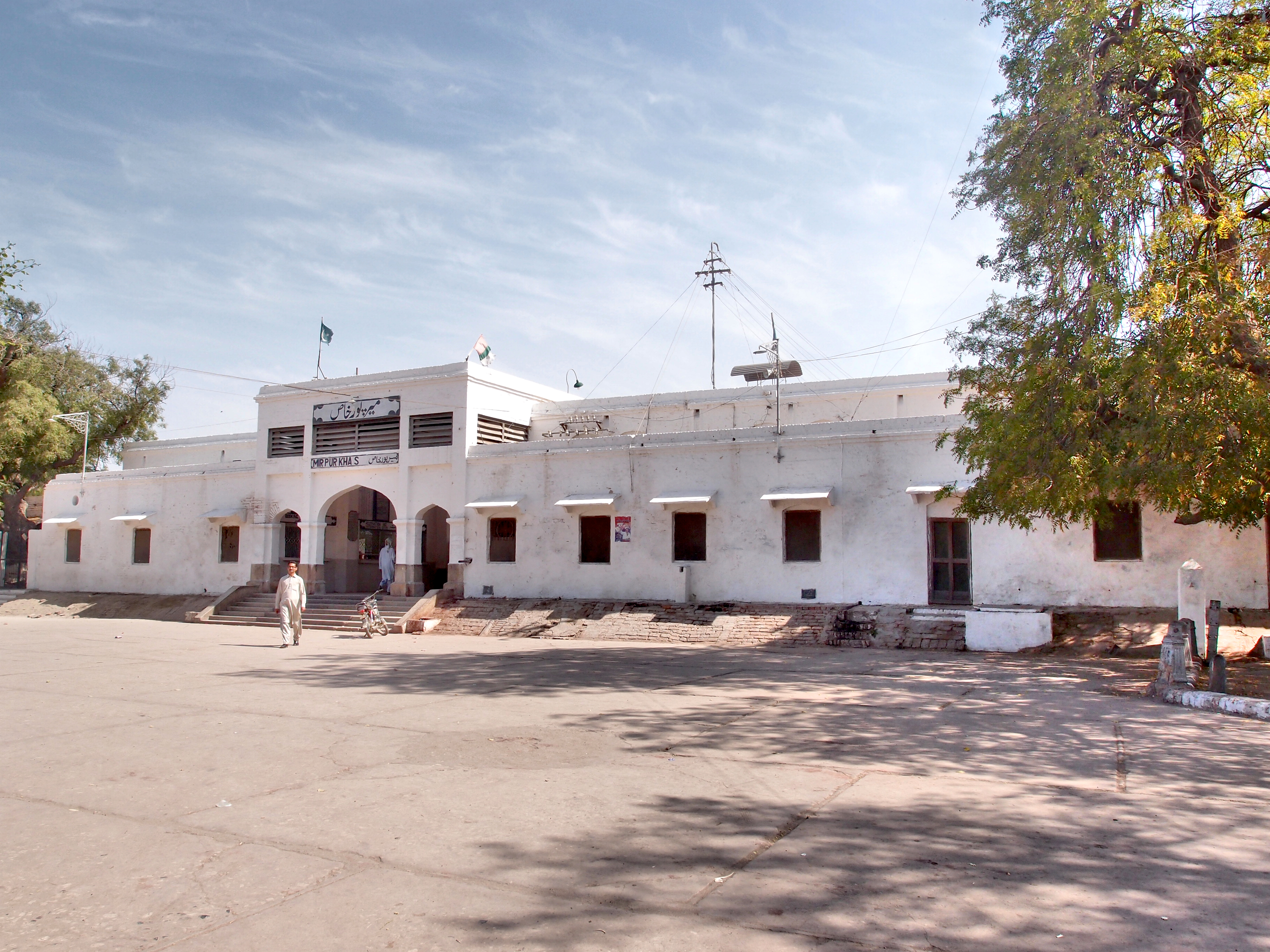

General information
- Coordinates: 25.5251°N 69.0172°E
- Owner: Ministry of Railways
- Lines: Hyderabad–Khokhrapar Branch Line; Mirpur Khas–Nawabshah Railway

Other information
- Station code: MPS

History
- Opened: 1926

Services
| Preceding station | Pakistan Railways | Following station |
|---|---|---|
| Tando Allahyar towards Kotri Junction | Hyderabad–Khokhrapar Branch Line | Jamrao Junction towards Zero Point |
| Terminus | Mirpur Khas–Nawabshah Railway (defunct) | Khan towards Nawabshah |
Location

Mirpur Khas Junction Railway Station (Urdu: میرپور خاص ریلوے اسٹیشن,Sindhi: میرپور خاص ریلوي اسٽیشن) is a junction located in the middle of the Mirpur Khas, Sindh, Pakistan on the Hyderabad - Khokhrapar branch railway line. The station is staffed and has a booking office.

== History ==
Before 1965, the Hyderabad-Khokhrapar Branch Line was metre gauge and Mirpur Khas railway station was the junction of Mirpur Khas - Nawabshah railway line. In 1965 Hyderabad - Mirpur Khas railway section converted to broad gauge and the rail link between Pakistan and India via Khokhrapar and Munabao closed. In 2006 the train service between Mirpur Khas and Nawabshah closed. In February 2006 Mirpur Khas - Khokhrapar metre gauge railway line converted to broad gauge and railway link between Pakistan and India via Khokhrapar and Munabao was restored again.

== Train routes ==
The routes of Hyderabad Mirpur Khas branch line are linked from Karachi as follows: Karachi, Landhi, Dhabeji, Jang Shahi, Jhampir, Kotri,Hyderabad, Tando Jam, Tando Allahyar, Mirpur Khas, Dhoro Naro, Pithoro, Chorr, Khokhrapar.

=== Train services from Mirpur Khas ===
| Train Name | Train Code | Stations |
|---|---|---|
| Express | 305 UP, 306 DN | Mirpur Khas, Tando Allahyar, Rashidabad, Tajpur Nasarpur Road, Tando Jam, Hyderabad |
| Hyderabad Express | 163 UP, 164 DN | Mirpur Khas, Tando Allahyar, Tajpur Nasarpur Road, Hyderabad |
| Kotri Express | 153 UP, 154 DN | Mirpur Khas, Tando Allahyar, Tajpur Nasarpur Road, Hyderabad, Kotri |
| Mehran Express | 149 UP, 150 DN | Mirpur Khas, Tando Allahyar, Hyderabad, Landhi, Drigh Road, Karachi |
| Mirpur Khas Express | 159 UP, 160 DN | Mirpur Khas, Tando Allahyar, Tajpur Nasarpur Road, Hyderabad |
| Marvi Passenger | 335 UP, 336 DN | Mirpur Khas, Pithoro, Dhoro Naro, Hasisar, Chhor, Vasar Bah, Khokhrapar |
| Saman Sarkar Express | 155 UP, 156 DN | Mirpur Khas, Tando Allahyar, Tajpur Nasarpur Road, Hyderabad |

== See also ==
- Pakistan Railways
- List of railway stations in Pakistan
- Rawalpindi Railway Station
- Lahore Railway Station
- Quetta Railway Station
- Peshawar Railway Station
- Larkana Railway Station
