= Marvi railway station =

Railway station in Pakistan

Marvi Railway Station

General information
- Coordinates: 25.7320°N 70.2573°E
- Owner: Ministry of Railways
- Line: Hyderabad–Khokhrapar Branch Line
- Platforms: 1
- Tracks: 1

Construction
- Platform levels: Ground

Other information
- Station code: ZPT

History
- Opened: 2006

Services
Preceding station	Pakistan Railways	Following station
Khokhropar towards Kotri Junction	Hyderabad–Khokhrapar Branch Line	Terminus
Location

Marvi Railway Station (Urdu: ماروی ریلوے اسٹیشن, is the eastern terminus of the Hyderabad–Khokhrapar Branch Line. It is situated 8 km (5.0 mi) east of Khokhrapar, Sindh and lies on the Pakistan–India border. The station was constructed in February 2006 when Mirpur Khas–Munabao 1,000 mm (3 ft 3 3/8 in) railway was converted to the present day 1,676 mm (5 ft 6 in). The station is used for immigration and customs of passengers who travel on the Thar Express between Pakistan and India.

== History ==
In 2019, it was renamed as Marvi railway station.

== Services ==
Preceding station	Pakistan Railways	Following station
Karachi Cantonment Terminus	Thar Express	Terminus

== See also ==
- Pakistan Railways
- Munabao railway station
