= Nawabshah railway station =

Railway station in Pakistan

Nawabshah Railway Station نواب شاہ ریلوے اسٹیشن نواب شاھ ريلوي اسٽيشن

General information
- Coordinates: 26.2458°N 68.4117°E
- Owner: Ministry of Railways
- Lines: Karachi–Peshawar Railway Line; Mirpur Khas–Nawabshah Railway
- Platforms: 03
- Tracks: 04

Other information
- Station code: NWS

History
- Opened: 1892

Services
Preceding station	Pakistan Railways	Following station
Sarhari towards Kiamari	Karachi–Peshawar Line	Bucheri towards Peshawar Cantonment
Shafiabad towards Mirpur Khas	Mirpur Khas–Nawabshah Railway (defunct)	Terminus
Location

Nawabshah Junction Railway Station (Urdu: نواب شاہ ریلوے اسٹیشن, Sindhi: نواب شاہ ریلوي اسٽیشن) is located in the city of Nawabshah on main railway line in Pakistan. It is a major railway station of Pakistan Railways and was the junction of Nawabshah-Tando Adam loop and Nawabshah-Mirpur Khas meter gauge railway lines. It is the stop of almost all Express trains. The station is staffed and has advance and current reservation offices. Food stalls are also located on it platforms.

== Services ==
The following trains stop at Nawabshah station:

Preceding station	Pakistan Railways	Following station
Tando Adam Junction towards Karachi Cantonment	Allama Iqbal Express	Bhiria Road towards Sialkot Junction

The routes Nawabshah from linked to Karachi, Lahore, Rawalpindi, Peshawar, Multan, Faisalabad, Sargodha, Jhang, Attock, Rahim Yar Khan, Bahawalpur, Gujrat, Gujranwala, Rohri, Khanewal, Hyderabad and Nowshera.

== See also ==
- List of railway stations in Pakistan
- Pakistan Railways
