= List of railway accidents and incidents in Pakistan =

Pakistan Railways is the national, state-owned railway company of Pakistan with its headquarters in Lahore. Founded in 1861 as the North Western State Railway and headquartered in Lahore, it owns 7,789 kilometers (4,840 miles) of operational track across Pakistan, stretching from Peshawar to Karachi, offering both freight and passenger services, covering 488 operational stations across Pakistan.

== Statistics ==
There have been 27 major railway accidents during March 16, 2002 to June 7, 2021. There have been 537 railway accidents from June 2019 to June 2024 including 313 leading to loss of life or serious injury. Federal Government Inspector of Railways said that they are seeing a decline in railway accidents in the last 4 years. This is an incomplete chronological list of railway accidents and incidents in Pakistan.

== 1950s ==
- 1953: about 200 people were killed in a railway accident at Jhampeer.
- 1954: about 60 people were killed in an accident at Jung Shahi.
- 29 September 1957: 1957 Gambar train crash - Deaths 300, Injured 150.

== 1990s ==
- 4 January 1990: Sukkur rail disaster
- 8 June 1991:

== 2000s ==
Date	Accident	Location	Trains	Cause	Deaths	Injured	Refs
16 March 2002	A train from Lahore to Faisalabad derailed at Qila Sattar Shah railway station	near Sheikhupura	1		7	15	
26 Sept 2002	Quetta Express derailed	near Sibi	1	as a railway bridge on the Sibi-Jacobabad section collapsed	7	57	
20 Sept 2003	A train collided with a bus	near Malikwal, Mandi Bahauddin district	1		28	10	
13 July 2005	2005 Ghotki rail crash	at the Sarhad railway station, about 49km from Sukkur	3	three passenger trains collided	130	1000	
30 Jan 2006	A train from Rawalpindi to Lahore derailed resulting 6 of its coaches fell into a deep ravine	at Domaili near Jhelum			4	40	
19 December 2007	Mehrabpur derailment				50	200	
3 Nov 2009	Allama Iqbal Express collided head-on with a goods train	in Karachi.			18	45	

== 2010s ==
Date	Accident	Location	Trains	Cause	Deaths	Injured	Refs
30 Aug 2011	Karachi-bound Khyber Mail ran into a stationary passenger train	nearly two kilometres from the Badami Bagh Railway Station in Lahore			3	18	
25 July 2013	A train heading to Rawalpindi from Lahore derailed	near Gujranwala City railway station			2	Several	
7 May 2014	Karakoram Express derailed	near the Bandhi railway station, 55km from Nawabshah			2	15	
11 Nov 2014	A collision between a passenger coach and truck	near the Theri Bypass in Khairpur			58	Several	
2 July 2015	2015 Gujranwala derailment	near Gujranwala.		3 bogies of army official's special train fell into a canal and another one derailed as a railway bridge collapsed	19	100+	
19 July 2015	A collision between car and a Karachi-bound Green Line (Pakistan Railways)	at an unnamed railway crossing at the Palijani railway station yard in Matiari			6 (family)		
17 November 2015	Aab-e-Gum derailment	at Aab-e-Gum	1	Jaffar Express derailed on its way from Quetta to Rawlpindi.	20	96	
15 Sept 2016	Karachi-bound Awam Express Train collided with a freight train	near Multan			6	150+	
8 Oct 2016	A freight train collided with a bus carrying workers of a factory	at Landa level-crossing near Gujjar Chowk	1		4	10	
3 November 2016	Karachi rail crash, Bahauddin Zakaria Express from Multan rammed into Fareed Express from Lahore	near Karachi's Landhi Junction railway station			22	40+	
6 Jan 2017	A train crushed two motorized rickshaws on an un-gated crossing	in Punjab's Lodhran district			7 (schoolchildren)	1	
28 March 2017	Karachi-bound Shalimar Express collided with an oil tanker	in Punjab's Sheikhupura district			2	5	
24 Dec 2018	3 coaches of Shalimar Express derailed and hit Millat Express stationed at an adjacent track	at the Resalewala train crossing in Faisalabad			1	6	
20 June 2019	Jinnah Express, hit a freight car	near Hyderabad			3	Several	
11 July 2019	Quetta-bound Akbar Express crashed into the back of a goods train	at Walhar railway station’s loop line, near Sadiqabad			21	185	
31 Oct 2019	2019 Tezgam train fire Tezgam Express caught fire	near Rahim Yar Khan			74	40	

== 2020s ==
Date	Accident	Location	Trains	Cause	Deaths	Injured	Refs
28 Feb 2020	A bus crossing an unstaffed railway crossing was crushed by the Lahore-bound Pakistan Express train coming from Karachi	near Rohri	1		19	30+	
3 July 2020	Shah Hussain Express train rammed into a coaster	near Sheikhupura in Punjab			20 (19 Sikh pilgrims)		
7 March 2021	several coaches of the Lahore-bound Karachi Express derailed	between Mando Dero and Sangi railway station near Rohri.			1	30	
7 June 2021	2021 Ghotki rail crash	near Daharki, a city located in the Ghotki district of upper Sindh		2 passenger trains collided	65	150+	
27 April 2023	2023 Karachi Express train fire	near Tando Masti Khan			7	Unknown	
6 August 2023	2023 Hazara Express derailment	near Nawabshah, in Sindh.			30	100+	
24 September 2023	A passenger train collided with a freight train	In Sheikhupura				31	
