= Karachi Express =

Pakistani passenger train

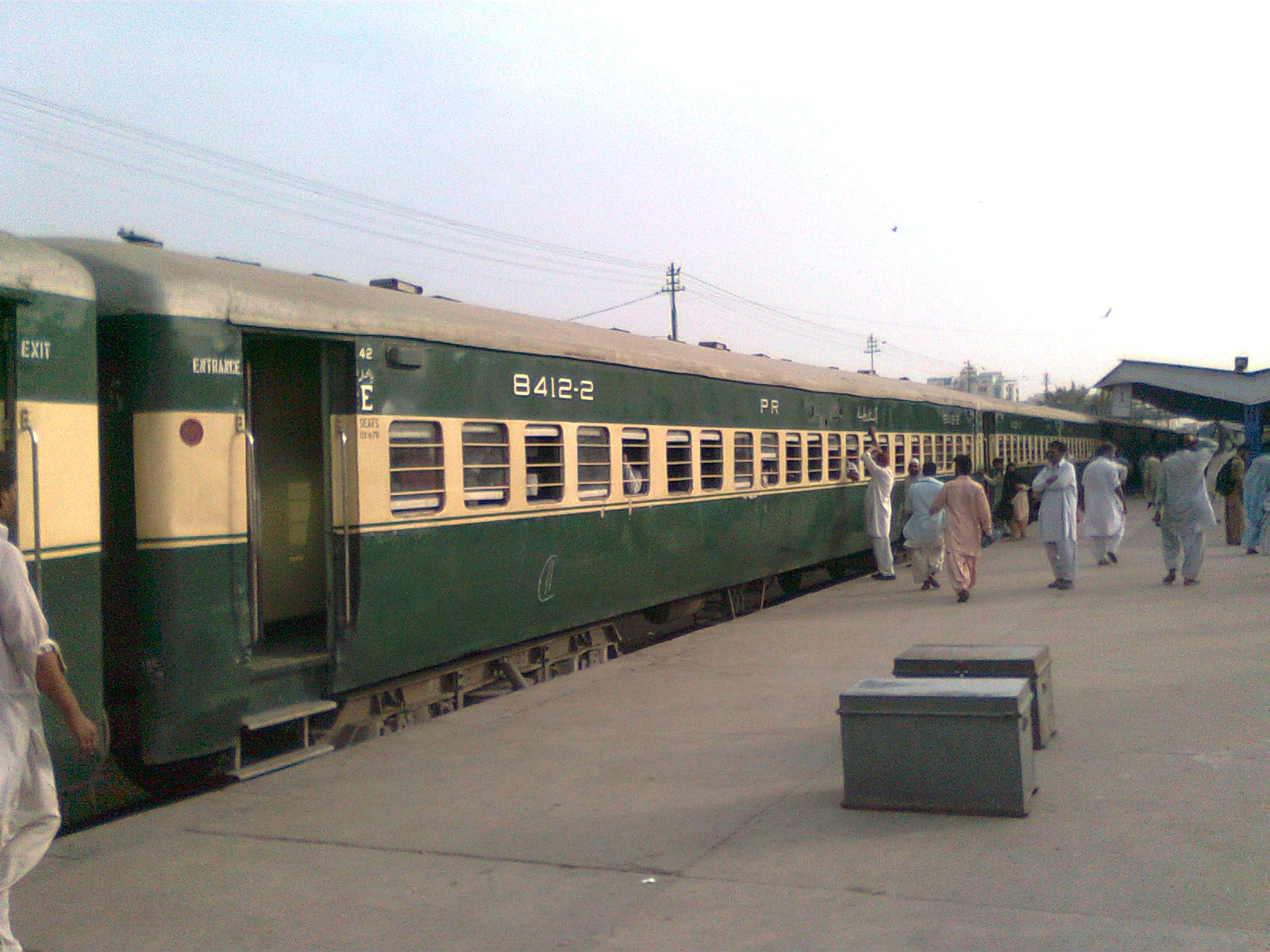
- Karachi Express at Karachi Cantonment railway station

Overview
- Service type: Inter-city rail
- First service: 1943
- Current operator: Pakistan Railways

Route
- Termini: Karachi City; Lahore Junction
- Stops: 12
- Distance travelled: 1,259 kilometres (782 mi)
- Average journey time: 19 hours, 30 minutes
- Service frequency: Daily
- Train numbers: 15UP (Karachi→Lahore); 16DN (Lahore→Karachi)

On-board services
- Classes: AC Sleeper; AC Business; AC Standard; Economy Class
- Sleeping arrangements: Available
- Catering facilities: Available
- Observation facilities: Medium sized windows in all carriages
- Baggage facilities: Underseat; Overhead racks

Technical
- Track gauge: 1,676 mm (5 ft 6 in)
- Track owner: Pakistan Railways

Karachi Express (Urdu: کراچی ایکسپریس) is a passenger train operated daily by Pakistan Railways between Karachi City and Lahore. The trip takes approximately 18 hours and 30 minutes to cover a published distance of 1,259 kilometres (782 mi), traveling along a stretch of the Karachi–Peshawar Railway Line.

== History ==
The Karachi Express began in 1943 and was originally between Karachi and Peshawar. Shortly after, the route was shortened between Karachi to Lahore. In 1999, Pakistan Railways began running non-stop, with only one technical stop at Khanpur. By 2003, economy class coaches were added and ceased to be a non-stop train. During the PPP government in Pakistan, 2008–2013, the train service was almost completely finished due to shortage of power vans and locomotives. During much of 2012, the train was only running with economy class coaches and coupled with Millat Express from Khanewal onwards to Karachi. On 16 May 2013, the train was refurbished and a new rake was arranged that included 10 Economy, 3 AC Business, 2 AC Standard and 1 AC Sleeper class coaches. The route of the train was also changed so that now the train is running between Karachi and Lahore via Lodhran-Multan-Khanewal section instead of the Lodhran-Jahanian-Khanewal section. The train still covers the 1,225 kilometres (761 mi) distance between Karachi and Lahore in 18 hours.

== Route ==
- Karachi City–Lahore Junction via Karachi–Peshawar Railway Line

== Station stops ==
- Karachi Cantonment
- Hyderabad Junction
- Nawabshah
- Rohri Junction
- Bahawalpur
- Multan Cantonment
- Khanewal Junction
- Sahiwal
- Okara
- Raiwind Junction
- Kot Lakhpat
- Lahore Junction

== Incidents ==
- Ghotki train crash
  - In its worst accident three passenger trains collided on 13 July 2005, derailing 13 carriages and leaving at least 120 dead. The Karachi Express ran into the back of the Quetta Express while it was stopped at a station near Ghotki, and the Tezgam travelling in the opposite direction hit several of the derailed carriages. According to officials, the conductor of the Karachi Express misread a signal.
- Mehrabpur train derailment
  - On 19 December 2007, Karachi Express derailed near the town of Mehrabpur in the Sindh province of Pakistan. At around 2:25 a.m. local time, fourteen of the train's sixteen carriages left the tracks, some being mangled by the crash, others simply sliding down an embankment into the water. Sabotage and terrorism were ruled out as the reason for the crash, with officials believing a faulty track was the cause of the derailment.
- Sukkur train derailment
  - On 6 March 2021, the Karachi Express, headed from Karachi to Lahore, derailed near Sukkur District, injuring 13 passengers.
- Tando Masti Khan fire
  - On 26 April 2023, the Karachi Express, headed from Karachi to Lahore, Caught fire near Tando Masti Khan Railway station, in which 6 people were killed.

== See also ==
- List of railway accidents and incidents in Pakistan
