= Ghotki rail crash =

Ghotki rail crash may refer to:

- 1991 Ghotki train crash
- 2005 Ghotki rail crash
- 2021 Ghotki rail crash
