= 2023 Karachi Express train fire =

Train fire in Pakistan

Details
- Location: Tando Masti Khan, Khairpur district, Sindh, Pakistan
- Country: Pakistan
- Line: Karachi-Lahore line
- Operator: Pakistan Railways
- Incident type: Train fire
- Cause: Under investigation; possible sabotage or electrical malfunction

Statistics
- Deaths: 7
- Injured: unknown
- Missing: 4

On 27 April 2023, early in the morning, a fire broke out in a coach of the Karachi Express train, leaving at least seven people dead, including four children and a woman. The event happened as the train was traveling from Karachi to Lahore in Sindh's Khairpur district near Tando Masti Khan. The cause of the fire has not been conclusively determined.

== Background ==
Before the train arrived at the Rohri station, the railway authorities reported that the fire had begun in the business class compartment. The driver stopped the train and began getting the passengers off. The fire was extinguished, and the rescue mission was over. Following the affected cabin's separation from other compartments, the train continued on its route to Khairpur. A woman allegedly perished while attempting to jump from the train to escape the fire, according to the authorities.

Khawaja Saad Rafique, Federal Minister of Railways and Aviation, commissioned an investigation into the event. The investigative team arrived in Khairpur to ascertain the origin of the fire and any potential government negligence.

== Reactions ==
Caretaker Punjab Chief Minister Mohsin Naqvi expressed his sorrow over the loss of lives. He sought a report from the commissioner and RPO Faisalabad and directed to take legal action against the driver responsible for the negligence that led to the incident. The CM also instructed that the best medical facilities be provided to those who were injured in the accident.

Speaking about the incident during a National Assembly session, Railways Minister Khawaja Saad Rafique suggested that sabotage may have been involved. The minister promised a comprehensive investigation into the incident, which would reveal why the woman had to leap and how long it took the train to halt when the chain was pulled. The minister emphasized the necessity for provincial funding to increase rail safety and security measures in order to prevent further tragedies.

== See also ==
- List of railway accidents and incidents in Pakistan
- 2019 Tezgam train fire
- List of transportation fires
