= 2021 Ghotki rail crash =

2021 derailment and collision in Pakistan

Details
- Date: 7 June 2021; 03:38 PKT (22:38 UTC, 6 June)
- Location: near Daharki, Ghotki District, Sindh
- Coordinates: 28°04′22″N 69°50′34″E
- Country: Pakistan
- Line: Karachi–Peshawar Line
- Operator: Pakistan Railways
- Incident type: Derailment and collision

Statistics
- Trains: 2
- Passengers: 1,208
- Deaths: 65
- Injured: c. 150

On 7 June 2021, before dawn, two trains collided near Daharki, in the Ghotki District of the southern province of Sindh in Pakistan, killing at least 65 people and injuring about 150 others. An express train derailed onto the opposite track, and a second express train crashed into the first roughly a minute later. (Note: A Pakistan Railways statement made to Dawn noted that both the derailment and the collision happened at 03:38 PKT (22:38 UTC, 6 June) and Arab News reported that a Pakistan Railways spokesperson stated that the derailment occurred "some 30 seconds before" the collision, while The Washington Post reported that the collision happened "a little more than a minute later" and the Associated Press reported that the derailment happened "minutes earlier".) About six to eight bogies were left "completely destroyed".

Locals rushed to the scene to rescue survivors, hindered by the darkness. The Pakistan Army, paramilitary Pakistan Rangers, an urban search and rescue team, helicopters, and accident relief trains later joined in the rescue efforts. An official investigation was ordered to establish the cause of the crash.

An investigation report done by Dr Omer M Qureshi/Automotive Design and Crash-worthiness Research determined that the initial derailment had been caused by the failure of a welding joint.

== Background ==
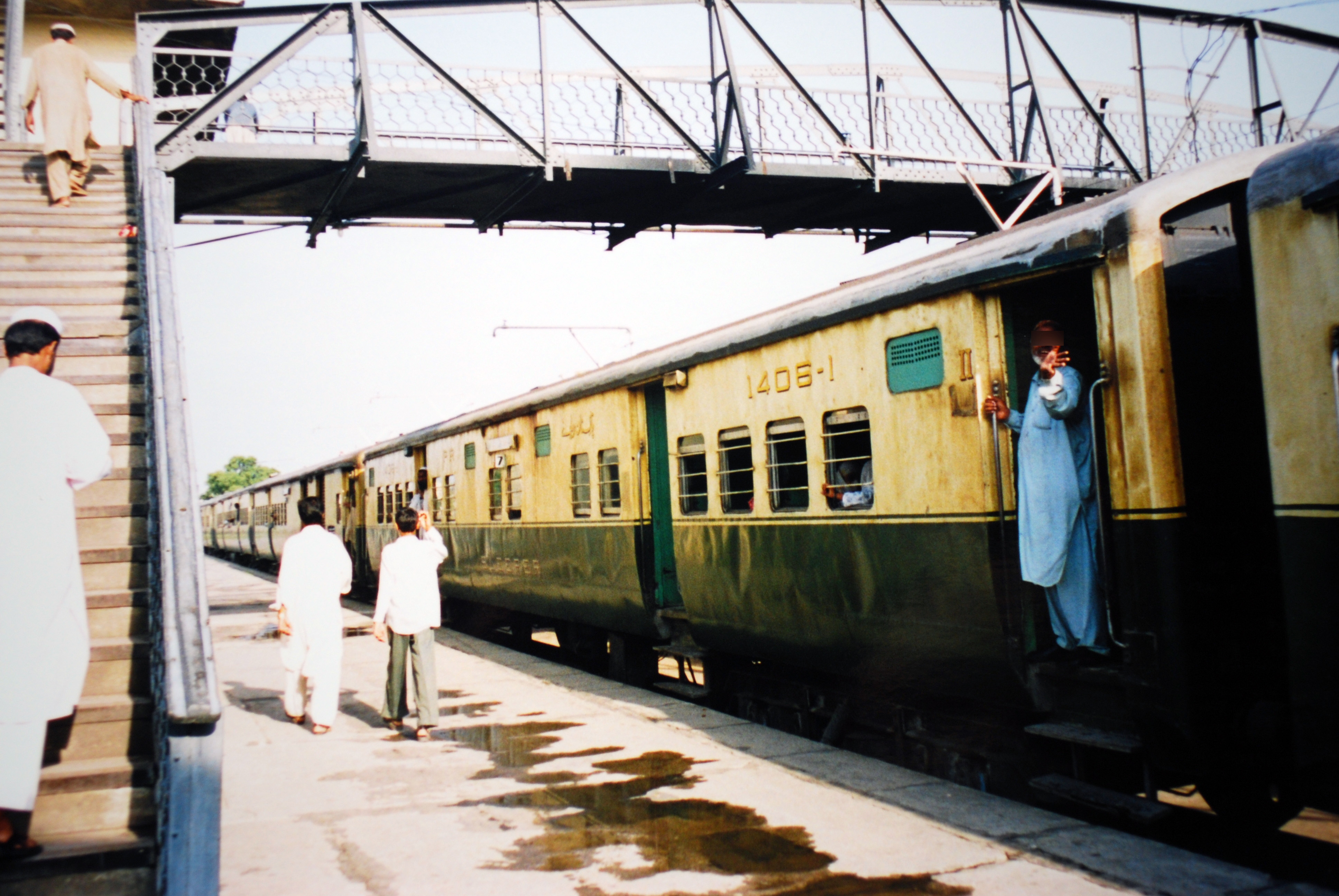
Pakistani sleeping car

The Pakistani railway system had been plagued with problems that have accumulated over decades of decay. Its signal system was poorly maintained, and much of its tracks were in a state of disrepair. Due to corruption and mismanagement, the railway system sees frequent accidents, and a lack of investment exacerbates issues. Although a number of governments have pledged to clean up the system, none have yet succeeded.

Prime Minister Imran Khan had also promised to modernise the railways, but accidents had continued to occur since he took office in 2018, including a train fire in 2019 that killed more than 70 people. The system had seen little maintenance in the years leading up to the accident, while The Express Tribune reported that "deadly train accidents ... seem to have increased in frequency".

Habibur Rehman Gilani, chairman of Pakistan Railways, stated that the tracks around the site of the accident were old and needed to be replaced. A former official has stated that some railway segments are still using tracks that had been laid before independence in 1947.

The Millat Express ran daily between Karachi, in the province of Sindh, and Lalamusa, in the province of Punjab.

== Collision ==
On 7 June 2021, before dawn, the Millat Express, originating from Karachi, left Daharki station, in the Ghotki District of the southern province of Sindh in Pakistan, at 03:28 PKT (22:28 UTC, 6 June), heading for Sargodha in the province of Punjab. Ten minutes later, at 03:38, the train derailed between the Daharki and Reti train stations, spilling eight bogies onto the opposite track whilst most of the train's passengers were sleeping. About a minute later and travelling in the opposite direction, the Sir Syed Express, which had left Rawalpindi bound for Karachi, crashed into the derailed train.

The driver of the Sir Syed Express stated that the train was travelling at a normal speed when he saw the derailed Millat Express on the tracks. He engaged the emergency brakes, but was unable to stop the train in time. A spokesperson for Pakistan Railways said that the Sir Syed Express did not have enough time to avoid crashing into the derailed train. According to the administration of Pakistan Railways, 703 passengers had been aboard the Millat Express, and 505 aboard the Sir Syed Express.

Ghotki deputy commissioner Usman Abdullah stated that 13 or 14 bogies had derailed due to the accident, and 6 to 8 of them had been "completely destroyed".

== Casualties ==
The collision killed at least 65 people and injured about 150 more. Four railway employees were among those killed. Umar Tufail, head of the Ghotki District police, stated that up to 25 people remained trapped in the wreckage.

== Response ==
External images
- Rescuers moving a victim from the site
- Heavy machinery extricating victims

Locals quickly rushed to the scene during the night to assist survivors, though darkness hindered their efforts. As daylight broke, authorities were still attempting to bring heavy machinery to the scene. The driver of the Sir Syed Express, who had been slightly injured, was rescued by locals two hours after the accident.

Also taking part in the rescue efforts were the Pakistan Army and paramilitary Pakistan Rangers, including military doctors, paramedics, and ambulances. A specialist urban search and rescue team was airlifted from Rawalpindi to assist in the operation. Two helicopters from Multan were flown in to evacuate victims. Accident relief trains arrived from Sadiqabad and Rohri with heavy machinery and rescue teams. The afternoon heat also hampered rescue efforts, with temperatures as high as 44 °C (111 °F) being reported.

Casualties were transported to hospitals in Daharki, Ghotki, Mirpur Mathelo, and Ubauro, where emergencies were declared. Seriously injured victims were airlifted to Pano Aqil.

== Aftermath ==
Authorities announced that the next of kin of those deceased would receive an ex gratia payment of Rs. 1.5 million (US$5,400), while those injured would receive between Rs. 100000 (US$360) and Rs. 300000 (US$1,100) depending on the injury.

== Investigation ==
Prime Minister Imran Khan stated that he was "shocked by the horrific train accident" and ordered an investigation. Federal Minister for Railways Azam Khan Swati stated that a "high-level inquiry" has been ordered to determine how the collision occurred, adding that it was unclear if the accident was a result of sabotage or the track's poor quality.

An initial investigation report stated that the failure of a welding joint on the right side of the northbound tracks caused the derailment of the Millat Express. Data were being retrieved from the black boxes of the two train engines for the final report.

== See also ==
- List of railway accidents and incidents in Pakistan
- 1990 Sukkur rail disaster
- 1991 Ghotki train crash
- 2005 Ghotki rail crash
- List of rail accidents (2020–present)
- Track spacing
