= 1957 Gambar train crash =

Train collision in Pakistan

Gambar Train Crash

Details
- Date: September 29, 1957
- Location: Gambar Railway Station, Pakistan
- Coordinates: 30.7500°N 73.3315°E
- Country: Pakistan
- Line: Karachi–Peshawar Line
- Operator: Pakistan Railways
- Incident type: Train collision
- Cause: 1. Lack of signals 2. Allowing two trains into same occupied block section

Statistics
- Trains: 2
- Deaths: 300
- Injured: 150

On September 29, 1957, a Karachi-bound express passenger train collided at full speed with a stationary oil-tanker train before midnight, at Gambar Railway Station. 300 people were killed and 150 wounded by the accident.

== See also ==
- List of railway accidents and incidents in Pakistan
