= Daud Memorial Hospital =

Daud Memorial Medical Center
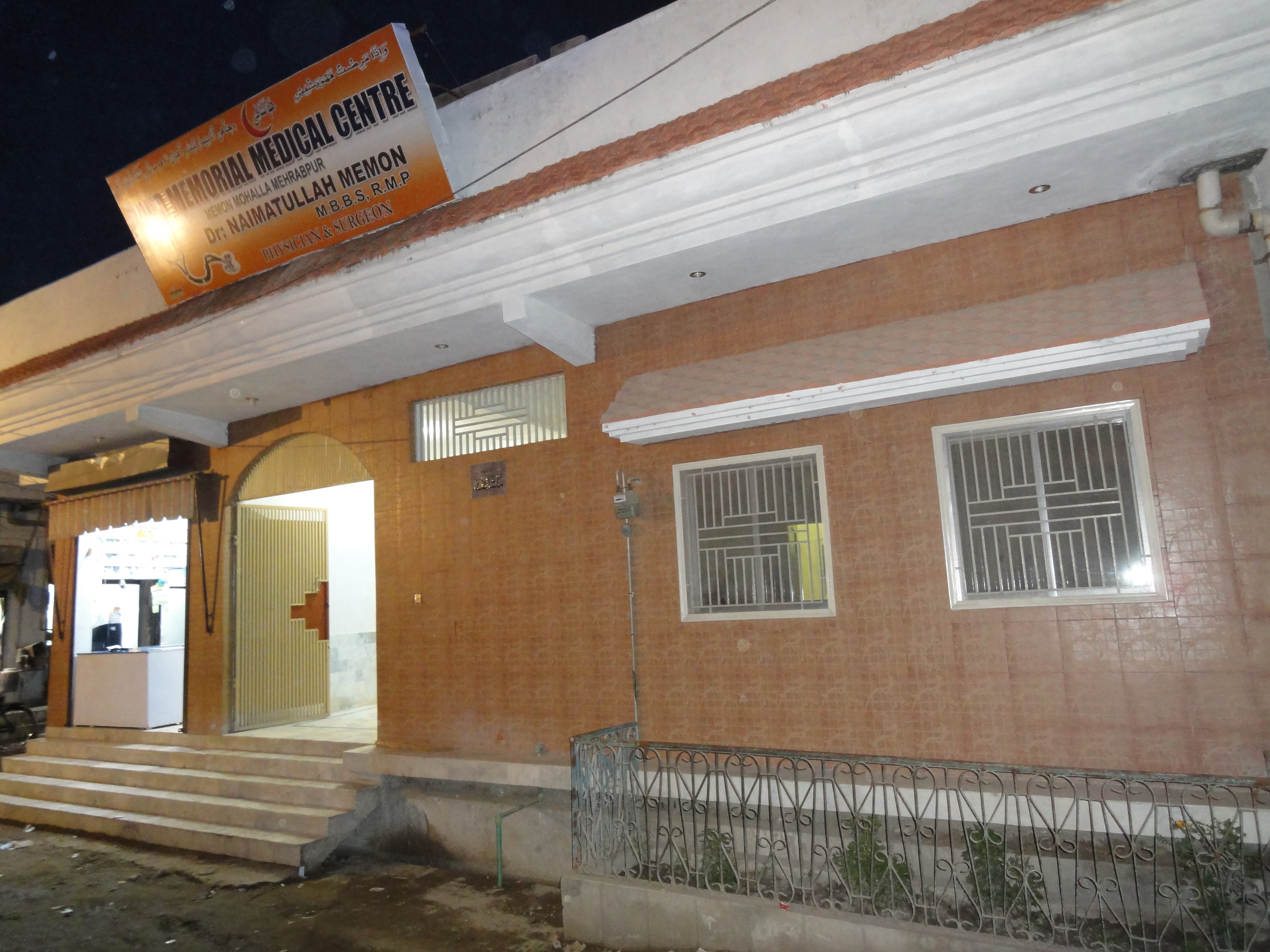
- Daud Memorial Medical Center, twilight view.

Geography
- Location: Mehrabpur, Sindh, Pakistan

Organisation
- Care system: Public
- Type: General

Services
- Emergency department: 24 Hours
- Beds: 08

History
- Founded: 5 April 2010

Links
- Lists: Hospitals in Pakistan

Daud Memorial Medical Center is a well equipped medical center which is located at unit no.06 on thari road at Mehrabpur.

The main objective of the founder is to establish a not-for-profit medical center, which would provide health care services to patients from all income groups, especially to lower and middle social classes.
