= Sarhad railway station =

Railway station in Pakistan

Sarhad Railway Station سرحد ریلوے اسٹیشن سرحد ريلوي اسٽيشن

General information
- Coordinates: 28.0370°N 69.4173°E
- Owner: Ministry of Railways
- Line: Karachi–Peshawar Railway Line

Other information
- Station code: SHD

Services
Preceding station	Pakistan Railways	Following station
Ghotki towards Kiamari	Karachi–Peshawar Line	Mirpur Mathelo towards Peshawar Cantonment
Location

Sarhad Railway Station (Urdu: سرحد ریلوے اسٹیشن, Sindhi: سرحد ریلوي اسٽیشن) is located in Sarhad village, Ghotki district of Sindh province, Pakistan.

== Incidents ==
The railway station was the unfortunate location of the 2005 Ghotki rail crash that took 130 lives.

== See also ==
- List of railway stations in Pakistan
- Pakistan Railways
