= 2023 Hazara Express derailment =

Train crash in Pakistan

Details
- Date: 6 August 2023; 13:18 PKT
- Location: Between Shahdadpur and Nawabshah, Sindh
- Coordinates: 26°09′33″N 68°27′04″E
- Country: Pakistan
- Line: Karachi–Peshawar Line
- Operator: Pakistan Railways
- Incident type: Train derailment

Statistics
- Trains: Hazara Express
- Deaths: At least 30
- Injured: Over 100

On 6 August 2023, at 13:18 PKT (08:18 UTC), ten coaches of the Hazara Express travelling from Karachi to Havelian in Pakistan derailed near Nawabshah, in Sindh. At least 30 people were killed and more than 100 were injured.

== Background ==
Due to outdated systems, some of which have not been updated since the colonial era, crashes and derailments on Pakistan's railways are not uncommon. The government has faced criticism for neglecting the signal systems and aging tracks. Residents said the tracks remained in bad condition after the 2022 floods. A day earlier, the Allama Iqbal Express derailed near Padidan without casualties. The 2021 Ghotki rail crash also took place in the same province. According to local reports from 2013 to 2019, 150 people died in train incidents.

== Incident ==
At 13:18 PKT (08:18 UTC), ten coaches of the Hazara Express derailed near Sarhari railway station, between Shahdadpur and Nawabshah, en route from Karachi to Sargodha. The train was carrying around 1,000 passengers. The injured went to the nearby Peoples Medical College Hospital in Nawabshah and operations on the main rail were halted as repair crews arrived. Investigators are determining the cause.

== Aftermath ==
Rescue 1122, Pakistan Railways, Pakistan Army, Rangers and police conducted relief and rescue operations at the crash site. Benazirabad Deputy Inspector General of Police Younis Chandio said that nine out of ten wrecked coaches had been cleared of the dead and injured.

== Investigation ==
Railway Minister Khawaja Saad Rafique said that no faults had been reported on the stretch of line where the crash happened, and ordered an investigation. A preliminary report submitted by a six-member team on 8 August 2023 stated that metal fishplates connecting the rails at the accident site were missing and that a section of track had been replaced with wood. The report also noted that wheels on the locomotive were damaged and that sabotage could not be ruled out. Six employees, including three officials, were later suspended. On 9 August 2023, Rafique disclaimed earlier reports that fishplates were missing and that wood had been used for repairs. The main cause of the accident, he said, was two stuck locomotive wheels and a damaged section of track.

== Reactions ==
Prime Minister Shehbaz Sharif tweeted: "I have sought a report on the incident from railway authorities." Interior Minister Rana Sanaullah tweeted: "My heartfelt sympathies go out to the families of the deceased passengers. The injured should be provided with the best healthcare facilities in the hospitals."

== See also ==
- List of railway accidents and incidents in Pakistan
