= 2015 Gujranwala derailment =

Railway incident in Gujranwala, Pakistan

Details
- Date: 2 July 2015
- Location: Gujranwala
- Country: Pakistan
- Operator: Pakistan Army
- Incident type: Derailment, causing a bridge collapse
- Cause: Bridge collapse

Statistics
- Passengers: ~300
- Deaths: 19
- Injured: 100+

The 2015 Gujranwala derailment occurred on 2 July 2015 when a military-special train carrying Pakistan Army unit was derailed at Gujranwala due to a bridge collapsing under it. Nineteen people were killed and over 100 were injured.

== Accident ==
On 2 July 2015 at 1200 hours, a Pakistan Army mixed train was derailed near the Chanawan Bridge on the Upper Lower Chanawan Canal near Jamkey Chattha, Gujranwala. The train comprised six passenger carriages and 21 wagons. It was travelling from Pano Akil to Kharian Cantonment. Four of the carriages were derailed. The train was carrying about 300 people, soldiers of the Pakistan Army Corps of Engineers and their families. One of the derailed carriages ended up in the canal. Authorities took steps to drain the canal in order to assist the rescue operation. At least nineteen people were killed and over 100 were injured. The injured were taken to the Combined Military Hospital in Gujranwara. A Pakistan Railways train had crossed the bridge safely an hour before the accident.

Railways Minister Khawaja Saad Rafique stated that the possibility that the cause was a terrorist attack could not be ruled out. A regional police officer stated that the bridge was in poor condition and that no explosive materials had been found at the accident site. Rafique suggested other forms of sabotage may have been used. Bridges in Pakistan are checked four times a year. Conflicting information was given about the state of the bridge, with Rafique stating that it passed an inspection in January 2015 and was found to be "faultless". It was also reported that the bridge was reported to be in an "extremely dangerous" condition.

It was subsequently reported that the locomotive hauling the train had derailed some 250 metres (270 yd) before the bridge, which collapsed as a result of the derailed train attempting to cross it. The condition of the track was reported as the cause of the derailment.

== Casualties ==
Among the 19 dead were the Commanding Officer Lieutenant Colonel Amir Jadoon, his wife and two children - a daughter and a son. Subedar Major Islam of the Engineer Battalion also died in the accident. Others include:

- Major Adil
- Captain Kashif
- Lieutenant Muhammad Abbas
- Train Driver Chaudary Muhammad Riaz
- Subedar Usman
- Naik Arif Nasir
- Lance Naik Zafar
- Sanitary workers Saleem and Usman

== Investigation ==
The Joint Investigation Team opened an investigation into the accident. Railways Minister Rafique stated that a final report would be produced within 72 hours. It was reported that Pakistan Railway officials had tried to remove evidence from the scene before investigators arrive on site. According to the report, a bogie of one of the carriages derailed 1 kilometre (1,100 yd) before the bridge. The condition of the track and sabotage are possible causes of the crash. On 7 July 2015, Federal Minister for Railways Khawaja Saad Rafique while putting the responsibility of the incident on the deceased driver revealed that the train incident occurred due to over-speeding. He also reiterated that Chawan bridge and the railway track was perfectly fine. However, an investigation team found some bolts and fish plates approximately some 400 meters away from the accident spot along with some frictional scratches on the track which contradicts the statement by Rafique.

== See also ==
- List of railway accidents and incidents in Pakistan
