= Aab-e-Gum derailment =

2015 railway accident in Pakistan

Coordinates: 29°48′15″N 67°24′02″E

Details
- Date: 17 November 2015
- Location: Aab-e-Gum, Balochistan
- Country: Pakistan
- Operator: Pakistan Railways
- Incident type: Derailment
- Cause: Under investigation

Statistics
- Trains: One
- Deaths: 20
- Injured: 96

The Aab-e-Gum derailment occurred on 17 November 2015 at Aab-e-Gum, Balochistan, Pakistan when the Jaffar Express passenger train derailed. Twenty people were killed and 96 were injured.

== Accident ==
The Jaffar Express, travelling from Rawalpindi to Quetta, derailed at Aab-e-Gum. Four carriages were derailed. At least twenty people were killed and 96 were injured, including about a dozen with critical injuries, and 33 with serious injuries. Both train crew were amongst the victims. The seriously injured were airlifted to hospital in Quetta by Pakistan Army Mil Mi-17 helicopters.

== Investigation ==
The cause of the accident is under investigation by Pakistan Railways. Officials have stated that the trains' brakes failed. A survivor of the accident alleged that the train was allowed to proceed with a known fault in its braking system.

== See also ==
- List of railway accidents and incidents in Pakistan
