= Track spacing =

Distance of the track centres of double-track railway lines

The track spacing is the distance between the track centres of double-track railway lines. There are standard distances derived from the standard loading gauge in a country. For high-speed trains and in tighter curves that distance needs to be increased.

The track spacing is also called the centre-to-centre spacing to differentiate it from the edge-to-centre spacing of a railway. These two values may be different depending on how signal masts are added to the overall track geometry.

== Description ==
The distance between the track centres makes a difference in cost and performance of a double-track line. The track centres can be as narrow and as cheap as possible, but maintenance must be done on the side. Signals for bi-directional working cannot be mounted between the tracks so must be mounted on the 'wrong' side of the line or on expensive signal bridges. Track centres are usually wider on high-speed lines, as aerodynamic pressure waves knock each other as high-speed trains pass.

The minimum track spacing can be derived from the loading gauge. The European Berne Gauge has a width of 3,150 mm (10 ft 4 in). The minimal distance to structures on the side of the track is half of it but that is doubled again for double track lines. As the carriage can sway and bounce within the rail gauge, one adds 100 mm (3.9 in) and with a possible displacement of tracks over time one adds some 250 mm (9.8 in) as a security margin. This leads to a minimum centre-to-centre spacing of 3,500 mm (11 ft 6 in). In fact, the first Prussian railways were built to that standard but it soon became apparent that it was too dangerous with some passengers having a hand or their head out of the window.

Narrow track centres might be 4 metres (13 ft) or less. Narrow track centres may have to be widened on sharp curves to allow for long rail vehicles following the arc of the curve, and this increases a surveyor's workload. Widening a track centre to 5 m (16 ft) or so suits high-speed trains passing each other, and eliminates the need to widen the centres on sharp curves. Increasing width of track centres of 6 m (20 ft) or more makes it much easier to mount signals and overhead wiring structures.

In the United Kingdom, the early lines of the Great Western Railway were built to Brunel's broad gauge, which was also associated with a more generous loading gauge. That is still apparent along those lines remaining in use today: structures such as bridges and tunnels are larger, and the distances between opposite platform faces are greater.

Very wide centres at major bridges can have military value, to make it more difficult to knock out both lines at the same time. It also makes it harder for rogue ships and barges knocking out both bridges in the same accident.

Railway lines in desert areas affected by sand dunes are sometimes built on alternate routes so that if one is covered by sand, the other(s) are still serviceable.

If the standard for track centres is changed, it can take a very long time for most or all tracks to be brought into line.

=== Regulations ===
The general standard in Germany and Switzerland had been to build new tracks with a centre-to-centre spacing of 3.8 m (12 ft) and a spacing of 4.5 m (15 ft) in railway stations. Depending on the use of the tracks it is still possible to build new double track lines with track centres of just 3.5 m (11 ft). With the trains going faster over time, the track centres were increased to 4 m (13 ft) on main lines.

The advent of high-speed trains required a stronger regulation which was done in Germany's EBO. The first update of 1982 increased the minimum track centre to 4 m (13 ft) allowing no more exceptions. However, in 1991 it was replaced with a formula taking into account the maximum speed of the trains on a track as well as the curvature. A distance of 4 m (13 ft) was considered enough for speeds up to 200 km/h (120 mph). At 250 km/h (160 mph) the tracks have a centre-to-centre distance of 4.5 m (15 ft) (while the first tracks in the 1980s were built with a distance of 4.7 m (15 ft)).

The TGV track construction puts both rail tracks into a common concrete block, so they can disregard the need for a safety margin due to track displacement. That allows high-speed rail to have a centre-to-centre distance of just 4.2 m (14 ft). Additionally, those lines are only allowed to be used by high-speed passenger trains. No out-of-gauge loads are expected and the train windows cannot be opened.

In Japan, the first high-speed tracks of the Central Japan Railway Company Shinkansen were built with a distance between track centres of 4.3 m (14 ft).

The largest minimum track centre is planned for India's high-speed network requiring a common distance of 5.3 m (17 ft).

=== Track centre examples ===
Track spacing distance	Example
9 ft 8 in (2.95 m)	Liverpool and Manchester Railway 1830 at opening day; later widened.
10 ft 8.5 in (3.26 m)	United Kingdom (standard gauge plus 6 ft (1.83 m))
11 ft 0 in (3.35 m)	New South Wales 1855 old standard (estimated)
12 ft 0 in (3.66 m)	New South Wales 1910 new standard for 10 ft 6 in (3.20 m) wide carriages. Rounded in imperial.
13 ft 1.5 in (4.00 m)	New South Wales 1973 metric standard; rounded in metric.
13 ft 9 in (4.20 m)	LGV Rhône-Alpes
13 ft 11 in (4.23 m)	Tōkaidō Shinkansen
14 ft 1 in (4.30 m)	San'yō Shinkansen
14 ft 9 in (4.50 m)	New South Wales Certain ARTC lines after about 2012.
14 ft 9 in (4.50 m)	Erfurt–Leipzig/Halle high-speed railway
15 ft 5 in (4.70 m)	Nuremberg–Erfurt high-speed railway (before 1998)

== Measurement ==
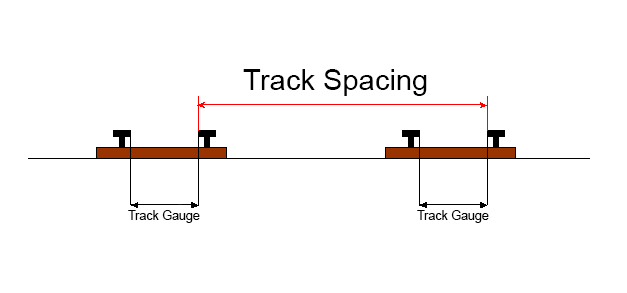
Measurement of track spacing from the rail head to rail head

By definition, the track spacing is given from centre to centre of a rail track. In actual construction, the distance is measured from the inside of a rail head to the matching one of the other track. If both tracks have the same gauge, it is the same distance.

== Sharp curves ==
The track centre may need to be widened on sharp curves. Gauge may also need to be widened. If concrete sleepers are used, they will have to be specially made.

== Accidents ==
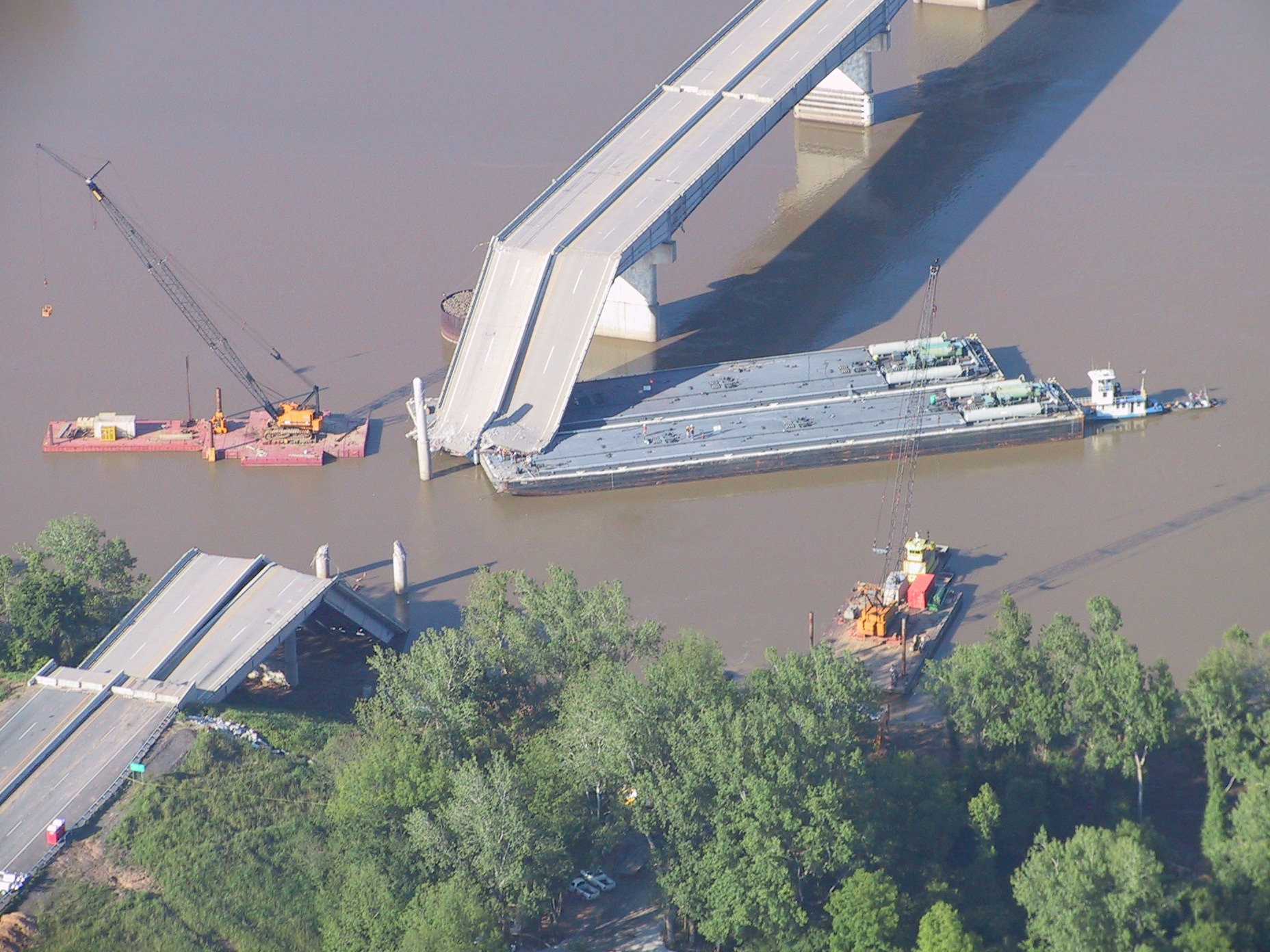
Bridge collision closes roads in both directions.

If track centres are "narrow" then a problem on one track may affect other track(s). That is called a "common mode" failure, and it affects railways, roads, and canals.

- In the 2020 Wallan accident, three of the four tracks were blocked by a derailed train.
- 2021 Ghotki rail crash - a second train ran into an already derailed train on the other track of a double track line.
