= Karachi rail crash =

2016 train accident in Karachi, Pakistan

Details
- Date: 3 November 2016; 07:18 PST
- Location: Karachi
- Coordinates: 24.8508°N 67.2119°E
- Country: Pakistan
- Operator: Pakistan Railways
- Incident type: Collision
- Cause: Wrong signal

Statistics
- Trains: 2
- Deaths: 21
- Injured: 65

The Karachi rail crash (also referred to as the Landhi rail disaster) was a train accident between the Fareed Express and the Bahauddin Zakaria Express that occurred on 3 November 2016 at 7:18 PST at Landhi station, in Karachi, Pakistan. The Fareed Express (from Lahore to Karachi) was parked at the Landhi station when the Bahauddin Zakaria Express, which was traveling from Multan to Karachi, collided with the Fareed Express from behind, killing 21 people and injuring 65 people. Minister of Railways Khawaja Saad Rafique originally attributed the crash to the engineers of the Bahauddin Zakaria Express for failing to see both yellow and red signals earlier en-route, but Senator Saeed Ghani attributed the crash to a green signal being accidentally activated on the track the Bahauddin Zakaria Express was traveling on.

== Accident ==
Witnesses described that Zakaria Express from Multan rammed into Fareed Express from Lahore, which was parked there, with the roar of the crash swiftly followed by the screams of people trapped inside. At least two carriages from the trains overturned due to the collision. TV footage showed the trains had suffered heavy damage. The train operation came to a complete halt after the accident. Two bogies of Fareed Express and one bogie of Zakaria Express were completely destroyed due to the collision. Adviser to Sindh Chief Minister on Labour Senator Saeed Ghani said that railway officials gave a green signal to the train coming from behind by mistake, and it went on to hit the train at rest. A factory worker Ajab Gul told to media that he was on his way to work when the accident occurred. Suddenly another train came speeding in and smashed into the parked train.

=== Drivers ignored signals ===
Federal Minister for Railways Khawaja Saad Rafique pointed to the negligence of the driver and assistant driver of the train coming from behind as possible cause for the incident. He said the drivers were first shown a yellow signal — an indication to slow down — followed by a red signal, "the [standard operating procedure] of which is stop (the train) dead for a minute and then proceed very slowly". He said the drivers ignored both signals, which "apparently" led to the collision.

=== Reactions ===
Pakistan Peoples Party Chairman Bilawal Bhutto Zardari visited those injured in the train accident at Jinnah Postgraduate Medical Centre. Zardari said there should be no politics on terrorism and accidents. Bilawal sympathised with families who had lost their loved ones. He also asked for the best medical treatment to be provided to the injured. He added there was not a single emergency centre in Pakistan and it would be the provincial government’s focus to build one in Sindh.

Chief Minister Sindh Murad Ali Shah also paid a visit to the injured.

== Aftermath ==
There were 16 dead bodies and 40 injured people taken to Jinnah Hospital, according to Dr. Seemi Jamali, head of the Emergency Department at Jinnah Hospital.

The injured were transferred to Jinnah Hospital, Abbasi Shaheed Hospital and Civil Hospital, where an emergency was declared.

All train traffic between Karachi and the rest of the country was suspended after the collision.

== See also ==
- List of railway accidents and incidents in Pakistan
