= 1991 Ghotki train crash =

Crash that killed over 100 people in Pakistan

Details
- Date: 8 June 1991
- Location: Ghotki
- Country: Pakistan
- Operator: Pakistan Railways
- Incident type: Collision

Statistics
- Trains: 3
- Deaths: 128

On 8 June 1991, a train crash killed over 100 people in Ghotki, Sindh, Pakistan. A passenger train carrying 800 passengers from Karachi to Lahore crashed into a parked freight train.

== See also ==
- List of railway accidents and incidents in Pakistan
