= Bahauddin Zakaria Express =

Pakistani train

Overview
- Service type: Inter-city rail
- First service: 1973
- Current operator(s): APNI RAIL (SSR GROUP)

Route
- Termini: Karachi City; Multan Cantonment
- Stops: 27
- Distance travelled: 929 kilometres (577 mi)
- Average journey time: 16 hours, 20 minutes
- Service frequency: Daily
- Train number(s): 25UP (Karachi→Multan); 26DN (Multan→Karachi)

On-board services
- Class(es): AC Business; AC Standard; Economy
- Sleeping arrangements: Available
- Catering facilities: Available

Technical
- Track gauge: 1,676 mm (5 ft 6 in)
- Track owner(s): Pakistan Railways
Route map
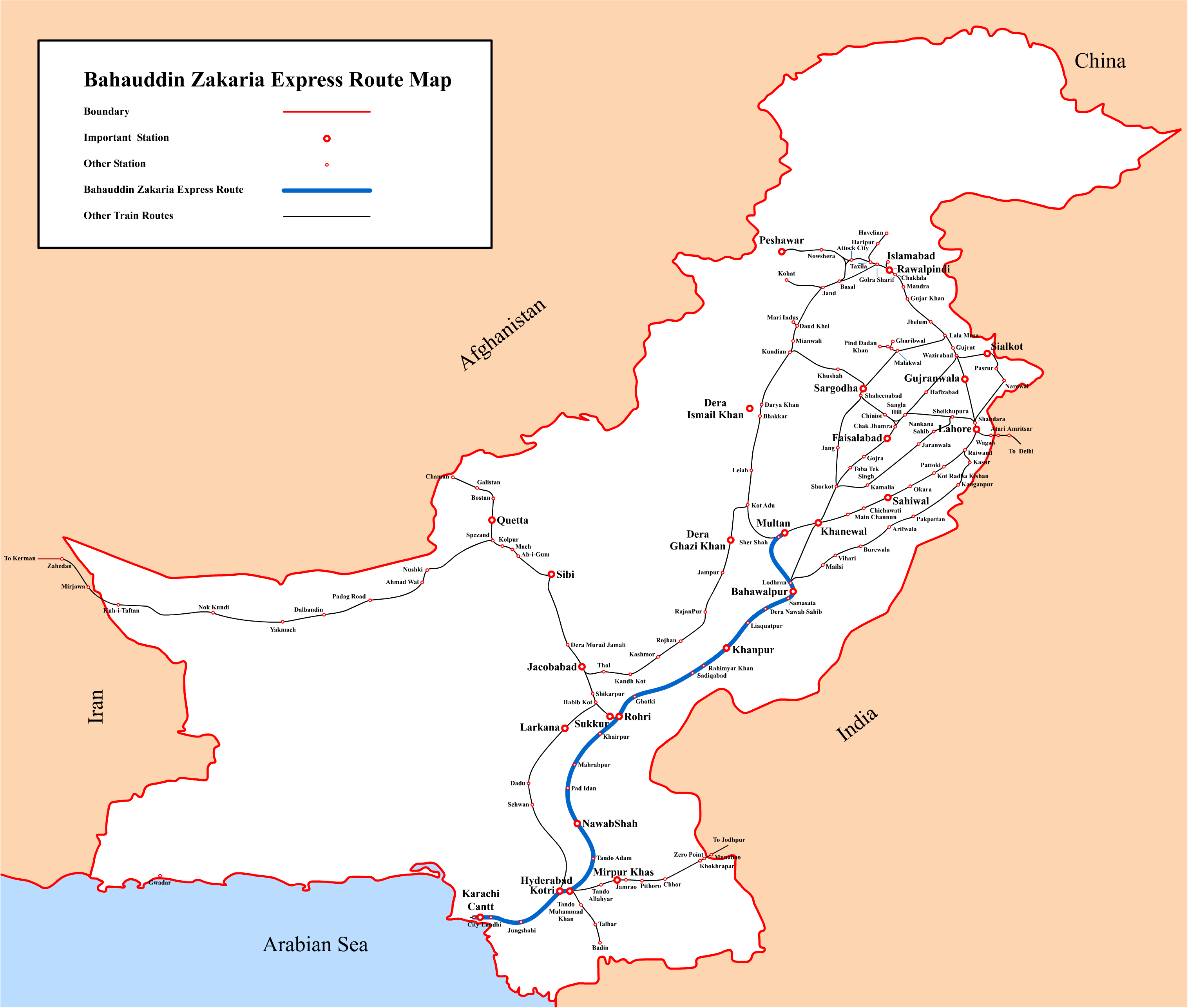
- Bahauddin Zakaria Express route map

Bahauddin Zakaria Express (Seraiki, Urdu: بهاءالدین زکریا ایکسپریس) is a passenger train operated daily by Pakistan Railways between Karachi and Multan. The trip takes approximately 16 hours and 5 minutes to cover a published distance of 929 kilometres (577 mi), traveling along a stretch of the Karachi–Peshawar Railway Line. The train named after Abu Muhammad Bahauddin Zakariya, a famous Sufi saint of the Suhrawardiyya order who lived in Multan between 1171 and 1262.

== Route ==
- Karachi City–Multan Cantonment via Karachi–Peshawar Railway Line

== Station stops ==
- Karachi City
- Karachi Cantonment
- Landhi Junction
- Kotri Junction
- Hyderabad Junction
- Tando Adam Junction
- Shahdadpur
- Nawabshah
- Daur
- Bhiria Road
- Mahrabpur Junction
- Rohri Junction
- Sadiqabad
- Rahim Yar Khan
- Khanpur Junction
- Firoza
- Liaquatpur
- Dera Nawab Sahib
- Samasata Junction
- Bahawalpur
- Lodhran Junction
- Shujabad
- Multan Cantonment

== Equipment ==
Bahauddin Zakaria Express offers AC Business, AC Standard and Economy seating accommodations.

== Incidents ==
- 1990 Sukkur rail disaster: On 4 January 1990, the Bahaudddin Zakaria Express was on a 560-mile (900 km) overnight run from Multan to Karachi. Near Sangi village outside of Sukkur, Sindh the tracks were incorrectly set and sent the train hurdling into a siding where it collided with an empty 67-car freight train at a speed of at least 55 mph, killing 307 people. It remains one of the worst rail disasters in Pakistan Railways history.
- 2016 Landhi rail accident: 22 people were killed and more than 65 injured when the Bahauddin Zakaria Express collided with the Fareed Express at Juma Goth Train station situated in Landhi, Karachi on the morning of 3 November 2016.
