= Akbar Express =

Pakistani express train

Overview
- Service type: Inter-city rail
- Status: Suspended
- Locale: Quetta
- Predecessor: Quetta Express
- First service: 5 August 1974
- Last service: 23 March 2020
- Successor: Pakistan Railways
- Current operator: Pakistan Railways
- Former operator: Pakistan Railways

Route
- Termini: Quetta; Lahore
- Stops: 30
- Distance travelled: 1,225 kilometres (761 mi)
- Average journey time: 24 hours 20 Minutes
- Train numbers: 23UP (Quetta→Lahore); 24DN (Lahore→Quetta)

On-board services
- Classes: First Class Sleeper; Economy; AC Standard
- Seating arrangements: Available
- Sleeping arrangements: Available
- Catering facilities: Available
- Baggage facilities: Available

Technical
- Track gauge: 1,676 mm (5 ft 6 in)
- Track owner: Pakistan Railways
- Timetable number: 23 UP 24DN
Route map
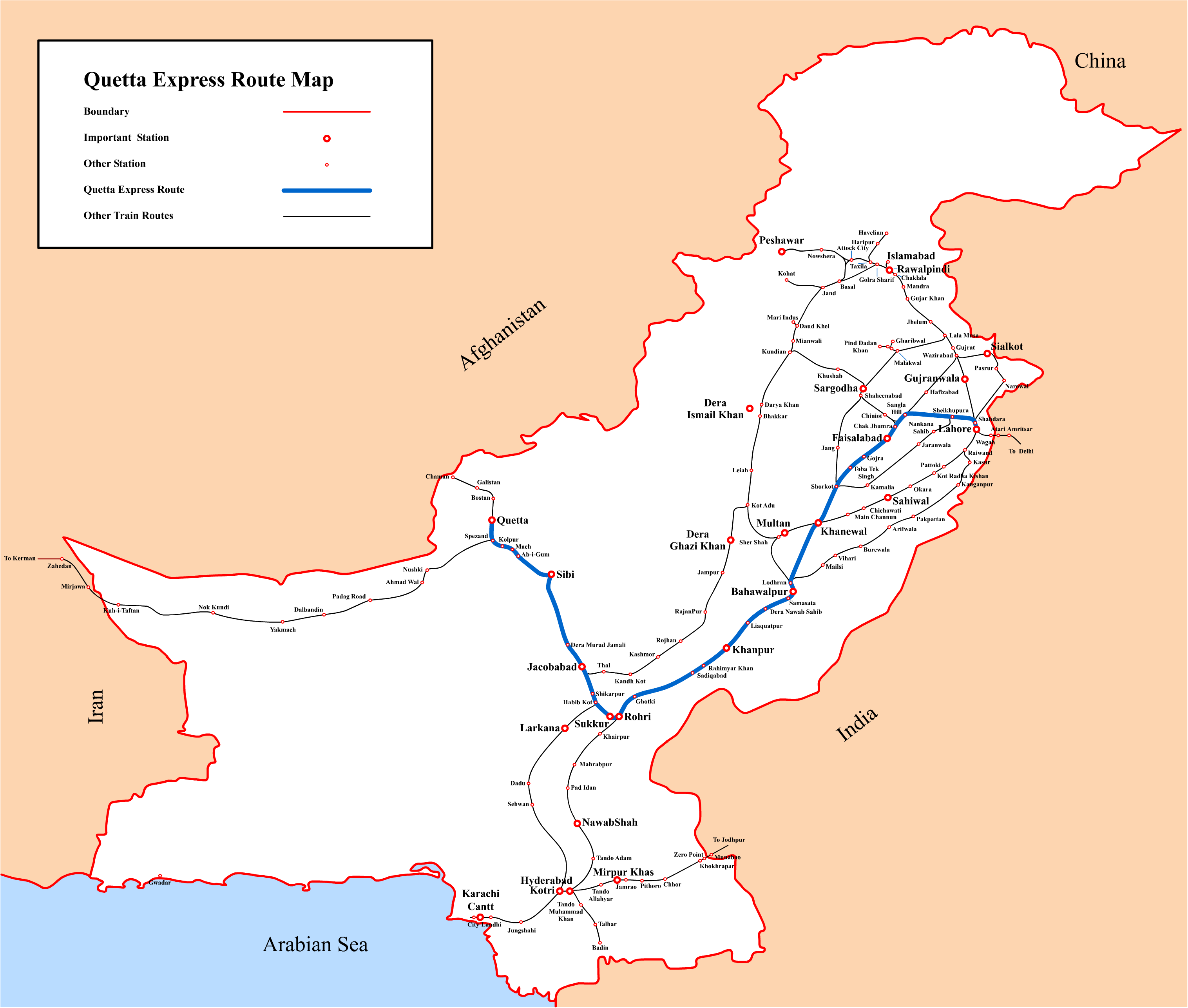

The Akbar Express (Note: Balochi: اکبر ایکسپریس, Urdu: اکبر ایکسپریس) was a passenger train operated daily by Pakistan Railways (PR) between Quetta and Lahore. The trip took approximately 23 hours and 30 minutes to cover a published distance of 1,225 kilometres (761 mi), traveling along the Rohri–Chaman Railway Line, Karachi–Peshawar Railway Line, Khanewal–Wazirabad Branch Line and the Shahdara Bagh–Sangla Hill Branch Line.

The Akbar Express was the only train that connected Faisalabad with Quetta.

== History ==
The Akbar Express was previously known as the Quetta Express. In August 2013, it was renamed to Akbar Express in honour of Nawab Akbar Khan Bugti, a Baloch nationalist leader and former head of the Jamhoori Wattan Party.

Pakistan Railways (PR) suspended the train in 2010 due to lack of locomotives but was resumed on 25 April 2013. However it was again suspended in March 2020 due to the COVID-19 pandemic.

== Route ==
Originally, the Quetta Express ran between Quetta and Peshawar via Rohri, Multan, Lahore, and Rawalpindi. Since being renamed to Akbar Express, the route has been shortened to Lahore via Faisalabad.

- Quetta–Rohri Junction via the Rohri–Chaman Railway Line
- Rohri Junction–Khanewal Junction via the Karachi–Peshawar Railway Line
- Khanewal Junction–Sangla Hill Junction via the Khanewal–Wazirabad Branch Line
- Sangla Hill Junction–Shahdara Bagh Junction via the Shahdara Bagh–Sangla Hill Branch Line
- Shahdara Bagh Junction–Lahore Junction via the Karachi–Peshawar Railway Line

== Station stops ==
- Quetta
- Kolpur
- Mach
- Aab-e-Gum
- Sibi Junction
- Bakhtiarabad Domki
- Dera Murad Jamali
- Dera Allah Yar
- Jacobabad Junction
- Shikarpur
- Sukkur
- Rohri Junction
- Pano Akil
- Ghotki
- Mirpur Mathelo
- Sadiqabad
- Rahim Yar Khan
- Khanpur Junction
- Liaquatpur
- Dera Nawab Sahib
- Bahawalpur
- Jahanian
- Khanewal Junction
- Shorkot Cantonment Junction
- Toba Tek Singh
- Gojra
- Faisalabad
- Sangla Hill Junction
- Sheikhupura
- Lahore Junction

== Equipment ==
The Akbar Express consists of ten coaches and four rakes with AC Standard, First Class Sleeper, and Economy Class accommodations.

1	2	3	4	5	6	7	8	9	10
Power Van	AC Standard	Economy	Economy	Economy	First Class Sleeper	Economy	Economy	Economy	Brake Van

== Incidents ==
On Sept 26, 2002, Quetta Express derailed near Sibi resulting 7 dead and 57 injured.

== See also ==
- List of railway accidents and incidents in Pakistan
- Pakistan Railways (PR)
- Jaffar Express
  - 2025 Jaffar Express hijacking
