= Aab-e-Gum railway station =

Railway station in Pakistan

Aab-e-Gum Railway Station آب گم ریلوے اسٹیشن

General information
- Coordinates: 29.8039°N 67.4031°E
- Owner: Ministry of Railways
- Line: Rohri-Chaman Railway Line

Other information
- Station code: ABG

History
- Opened: 1886

Services
Preceding station	Pakistan Railways	Following station
Peshi towards Rohri Junction	Rohri–Chaman Line	Mach towards Chaman
Location

Aab-e-Gum Railway Station (Balochi/Urdu: آب گم ریلوے اسٹیشن; also spelled Ab-i-Gum) is located in the town of Ab-I-gum, Kachhi District of Balochistan province, Pakistan. It is located 50 kilometers (31 mi) southeast of Quetta near Chilton mountain on the Rohri-Chaman Railway Line.

Ab-e-gum (Urdu: آب گم) is a Persian word meaning 'vanished water', a name given to a nearby underground spring.

== Services ==
The following trains stop at Aab-e-Gum station:

Preceding station	Pakistan Railways	Following station
Mach towards Quetta	Akbar Express	Sibi towards Lahore Junction
Sibi towards Karachi City	Bolan Mail	Mach towards Quetta
Mach towards Quetta	Jaffar Express	Sibi towards Peshawar Cantonment

== Stops ==
Only the Jaffar Express has a stop at the Aab-e-Gum Railway Station.

== Incidents ==
- 17 November 2015, the Jaffar Express derailed at Aab-e-Gum, killing 20 and injuring 96 people.

== See also ==
- List of railway stations in Pakistan
- Pakistan Railways (PR)
- Outline of Pakistan
