= Tezgam =

Pakistani passenger train

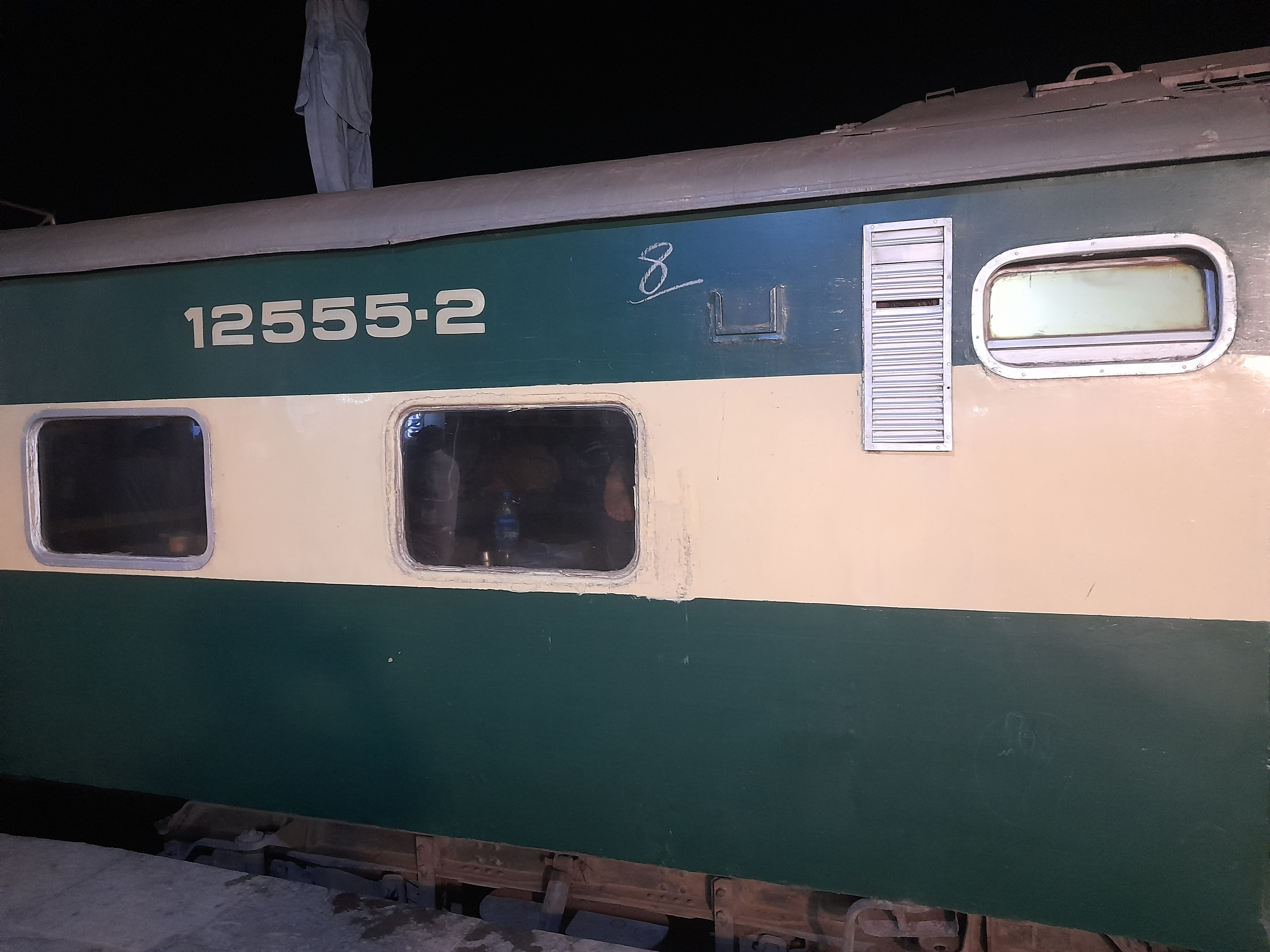

Overview
- Service type: Express
- Current operator: Pakistan Railways
- Website: www.pakrail.gov.pk

Route
- Termini: Karachi Cantt; Rawalpindi
- Stops: 26
- Distance travelled: 1,552 kilometres (964 mi)
- Average journey time: 26 hours and 30 minutes
- Service frequency: Daily
- Train numbers: 7 UP (Karachi-Rawalpindi); 8 DN (Rawalpindi-Karachi)

On-board services
- Classes: Economy Class; AC Standard; AC Business; AC Sleeper
- Seating arrangements: Available
- Sleeping arrangements: Available
- Catering facilities: Available
- Baggage facilities: Available

Technical
- Track gauge: Broad Gauge
Route map
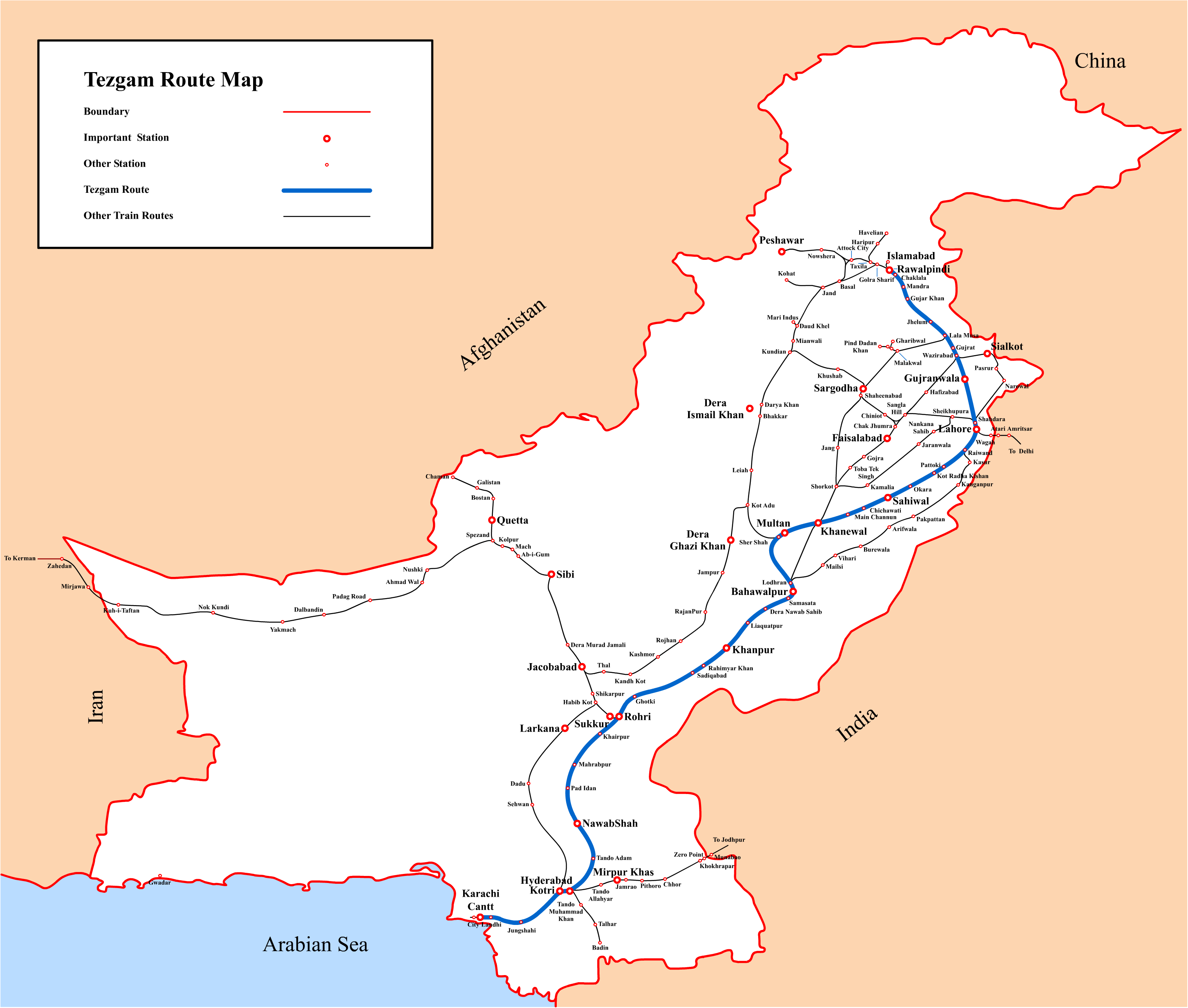
- Tezgam route map

Tezgam Express (Urdu: تیز گام ) is a daily express train service between Karachi and Rawalpindi in Pakistan. Tezgam means "fast runner". It is one of the oldest and popular trains of Pakistan. It was started in 1950s between Karachi and Peshawar. Later its route was shortened to Karachi and Rawalpindi.

Tezgam has Economy Class, AC Standard, AC Business and AC Sleeper accommodations. It covers 1,548 kilometres (962 mi) of distance from Karachi to Rawalpindi in 26 hours and 40 minutes.

== Route ==
Karachi to Rawalpindi via Hyderabad Junction, Rohri Junction, Bahawalpur, Multan, Lahore Junction and Lala Musa Junction

- Karachi Cantt
- Hyderabad Jn
- Tando Adam
- Shahdadpur
- Nawabshah
- Mehrabpur
- Khairpur
- Rohri Jn
- Rahim Yar Khan
- Khanpur
- Bahawalpur
- Multan Cantt
- Khanewal Jn
- Mian Channun
- Chichawatni
- Sahiwal
- Okara
- Pattoki
- Raiwind Jn
- Lahore Jn
- Gujranwala
- Wazirabad
- Gujrat
- Lalamusa Jn
- Jhelum
- Gujar Khan
- Chaklala
- Rawalpindi

== Incidents ==
- 2019 Tezgam train fire
