= Mehrabpur derailment =

2007 railway accident in Sindh, Pakistan

Details
- Date: December 19, 2007; 0200
- Location: Mehrabpur Junction railway station
- Country: Pakistan
- Line: Karachi–Peshawar main railway line
- Cause: Derailment

Statistics
- Deaths: 50
- Injured: 200

The Mehrabpur derailment was a fatal railway accident that occurred shortly after 02:00 local time on 19 December 2007 near the town of Mehrabpur in the Sindh province of Pakistan.

== Incident ==
The train, "Karachi Express", was an express service from Karachi to Lahore, and was packed with passengers returning home for the Eid ul-Adha Islamic holiday. At around 2:25 a.m. local time, fourteen of the train's sixteen carriages left the tracks, some being mangled by the crash, others simply sliding down an embankment into the water.

Sabotage and terrorism were ruled out as the reason for the crash, with officials believing a faulty track was the cause of the derailment. The death toll was initially estimated as at least 56 people, but Junaid Qureshi, director of operations for the state-run Pakistan Railways, later lowered the official estimate to 40 deaths and 269 injuries.

Among local people and those who were traveling through accident area, opinions about the number of deceased is much higher, estimated between 400 and 800 dead (with an average of around 500) and over a thousand injured. This is based upon the fact that 14 bogies were almost completely wrecked, and only two of the carriages were left more or less intact, with others being severely damaged.

Given that the accident took place in the holiday period, practically all the seats and sleepers were occupied, bringing the number of people in one carriage close to 80, therefore justifying higher estimation.

== See also ==
- List of railway accidents and incidents in Pakistan
