= Sukkur rail disaster =

1990 train crash in Sukkur, Sindh Province, Pakistan

Details
- Date: 4 January 1990
- Location: Sukkur
- Country: Pakistan
- Line: Multan to Karachi
- Operator: Pakistan Railways
- Incident type: Collision
- Cause: Incorrectly set points

Statistics
- Trains: 2
- Deaths: 307
- Injured: 700

The Sukkur rail disaster occurred on 4 January 1990 in the village of Sangi, near Sukkur in Sindh, Pakistan, claiming 307 lives. This makes it the deadliest rail accident in the country's history.

The Bahauddin Zakaria Express, on an 800-kilometre (500 mi) overnight journey from Multan to Karachi, was significantly over capacity with far more passengers than its 1,408-seat limit. The train was meant to pass through Sangi, but misaligned rail points diverted it into a siding where it collided with a stationary 67-car freight train at a speed of at least 55 kilometres per hour (35 mph). The collision destroyed the first three carriages and severely damaged two others, resulting in 700 injuries alongside the fatalities.

An investigation held railway staff directly responsible for the disaster, leading to manslaughter charges against three employees on duty at Sangi station.

== See also ==
- List of railway accidents and incidents in Pakistan

== Sources ==
- At Least 210 Die in Pakistan's Worst Rail Crash from The New York Times
- An improperly set railroad switch is blamed for the early morning collision from the Los Angeles Times
