= 2019 Tezgam train fire =

2019 train fire in Pakistan

2019 Pakistan train fire
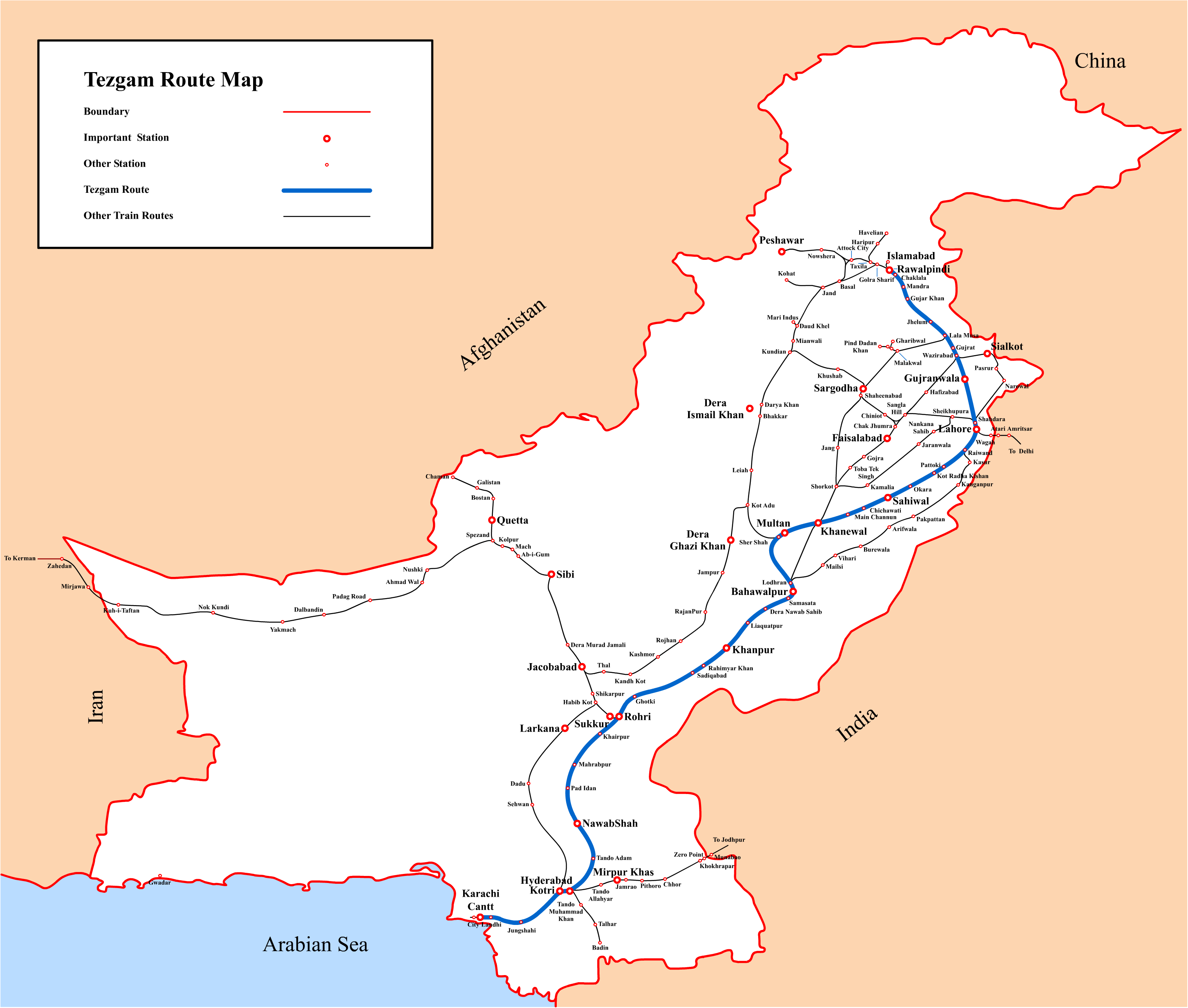
- Route of the Tezgam express shown in blue.

- Location of the fire on map of Pakistan

Details
- Date: 31 October 2019; 06:18 am PST (01:18 UTC)
- Location: near Liaquat Pur railway station
- Coordinates: 29°00′26″N 70°59′20″E
- Country: Pakistan
- Line: Karachi–Peshawar Line
- Operator: Pakistan Railways
- Service: Tezgam
- Incident type: Train fire

Statistics
- Trains: 1
- Passengers: 933
- Deaths: 75
- Injured: 43
- Damage: Three carriages destroyed

On 31 October 2019, Pakistan Railways' Tezgam passenger train caught fire while traveling from Karachi to Rawalpindi, resulting in at least 75 passenger deaths. It was the deadliest train accident in the country since the 2005 Ghotki rail crash, which killed more than 100 people. Preliminary evidence suggested the explosion of a portable stove might have occurred because some passengers illegally cooked food aboard the train. Such use of gas stoves is common on Pakistan's railways; train authorities often turn a blind eye to the dangerous practice. However, an inquiry report revealed in January 2020 that the incident occurred due a short-circuit in the electric wiring of the train, negating earlier reports of a cylinder blast.

== Fire ==
The accident occurred at 6:18 a.m. PST (01:18 UTC) on Main Line 1 in Liaquatpur tehsil, Rahim Yar Khan district, Punjab aboard the Tezgam express passenger train. Sheikh Rasheed Ahmad, the Pakistani Federal Minister for Railways, reported that two gas stoves exploded, setting the train on fire. Other reports, though, along with survivors' testimonies, suggested an electrical problem was the cause of the fire. The train was carrying 933 people, 207 of whom were in the three carriages that were gutted.

Ten fire engines were dispatched to the scene of the fire and Pakistani Army troops assisted in the rescue operation. The most severely injured were taken to Bahawal Victoria Hospital in Bahawalpur and Nishtar Hospital in Multan. Those with less severe wounds were treated at THQ hospital in Liaquatpur and Shaikh Zayed Hospital in Rahim Yar Khan. According to witnesses, the train's fire took 20 minutes to put out. Another train was dispatched to rescue stranded passengers and take them to Rawalpindi.

== Victims ==
Some of the 75 victims died jumping from the moving train, which reportedly did not stop until about 20 minutes after the fire broke out, despite the communication cord being pulled. Fifty-seven of the dead were burned beyond recognition; DNA tests were needed for identification. At least 43 passengers were injured, 11 critically.

== Reaction ==
The Prime Minister of Pakistan, Imran Khan, ordered an immediate inquiry into the accident. Sheikh Rasheed, the railways minister, announced a ₨1.5 million compensation fund for each of the families of the dead, as well as ₨0.5 million for those injured. Six railway officers were suspended after the accident.The inquiry report revealed in January 2020 that the incident occurred due a short-circuit in the electric wiring of the train, negating earlier reports of a cylinder blast.

== See also ==
- 2002 El Ayyat railway accident – a train fire with a similar cause.
- List of transportation fires
