= Pakistan Railways =

Pakistani state-owned railway company

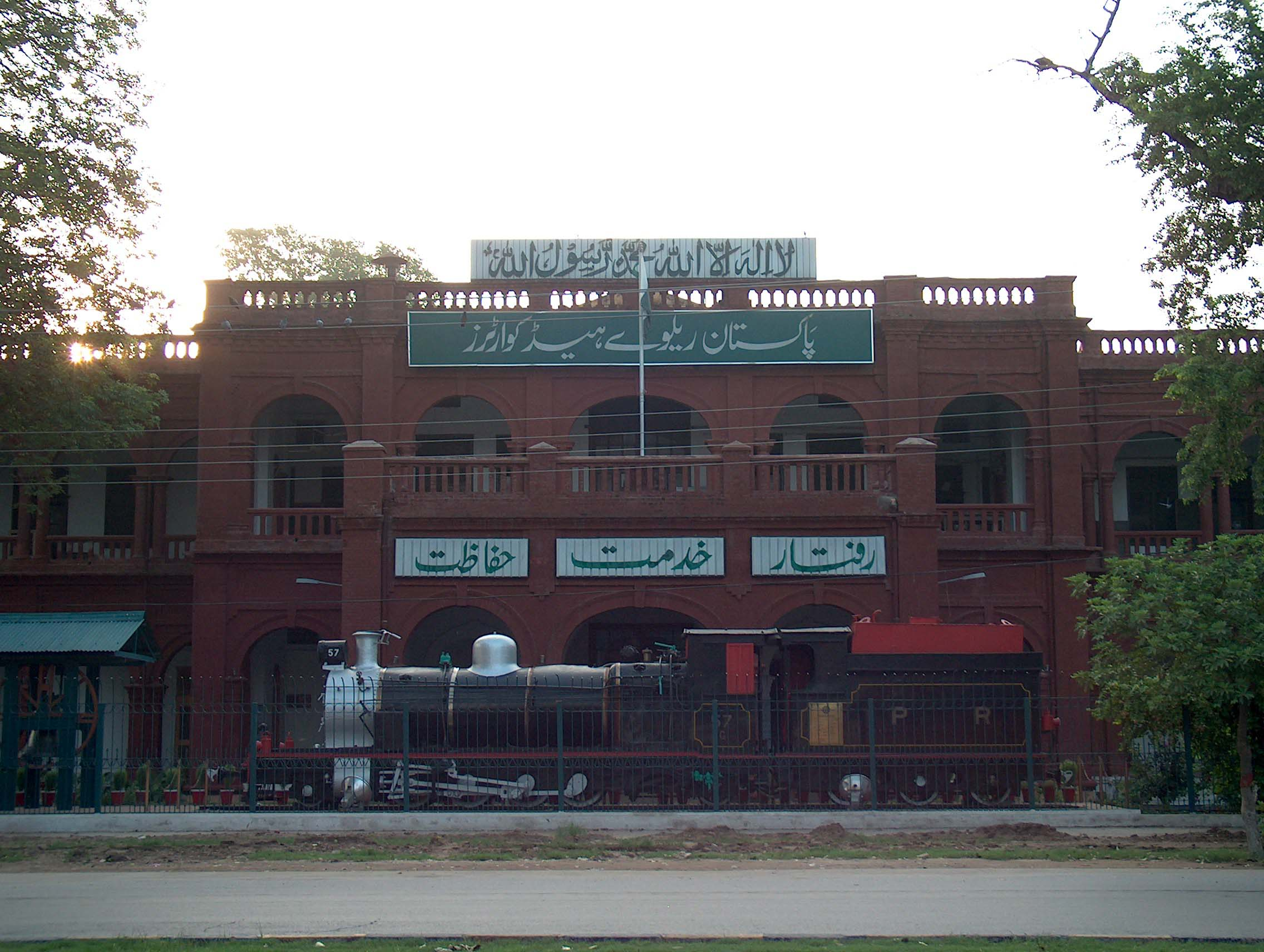
- Pakistan Railways headquarters, Lahore
- Native name: پاکستان ریلویز
- Type: State-owned enterprise
- Industry: Rail transport
- Predecessor: North Western State Railway; Pakistan Western Railway
- Founded: 1886 (140 years ago)
- Headquarters: Lahore-54010, Pakistan
- Area served: Pakistan
- Key people: Mazhar Ali Shah (Federal Secretary for Railways & Chairman of the Board); Muhammad Hafeezullah (CEO, General Manager)
- Services: Rail transport; Cargo transport; Parcel carrier; Catering
- Revenue: ▲ Rs. 93 billion (US$330 million) (2024–25)
- Owner: Government of Pakistan (1947–present)
- Number of employees: 58,680 (2023–24)
- Parent: Ministry of Railways
- Divisions: 07
- Subsidiaries: Pakistan Railway Freight Transportation Company (PRFTC) Pakistan Railways Advisory & Consultancy Services Limited (PRACS) Railway Constructions Pakistan Limited (RAILCOP) Railway Estate Development and Marketing Company (REDAMCO)
- Website: www.pakrail.gov.pk

Pakistan Railways (PR)

Operation
- Infrastructure company: Pakistan Railways (PR)

System length
- Total: 7,791 kilometres (4,841 mi)
- Double track: 1,409 kilometres (876 mi)

Track gauge
- Main: 5 ft 6 in (1,676 mm)

Features
- Longest tunnel: Khojak Tunnel
- No. of bridges: 14,021
- Longest bridge: Jhelum railway bridge
- No. of stations: 494
Map
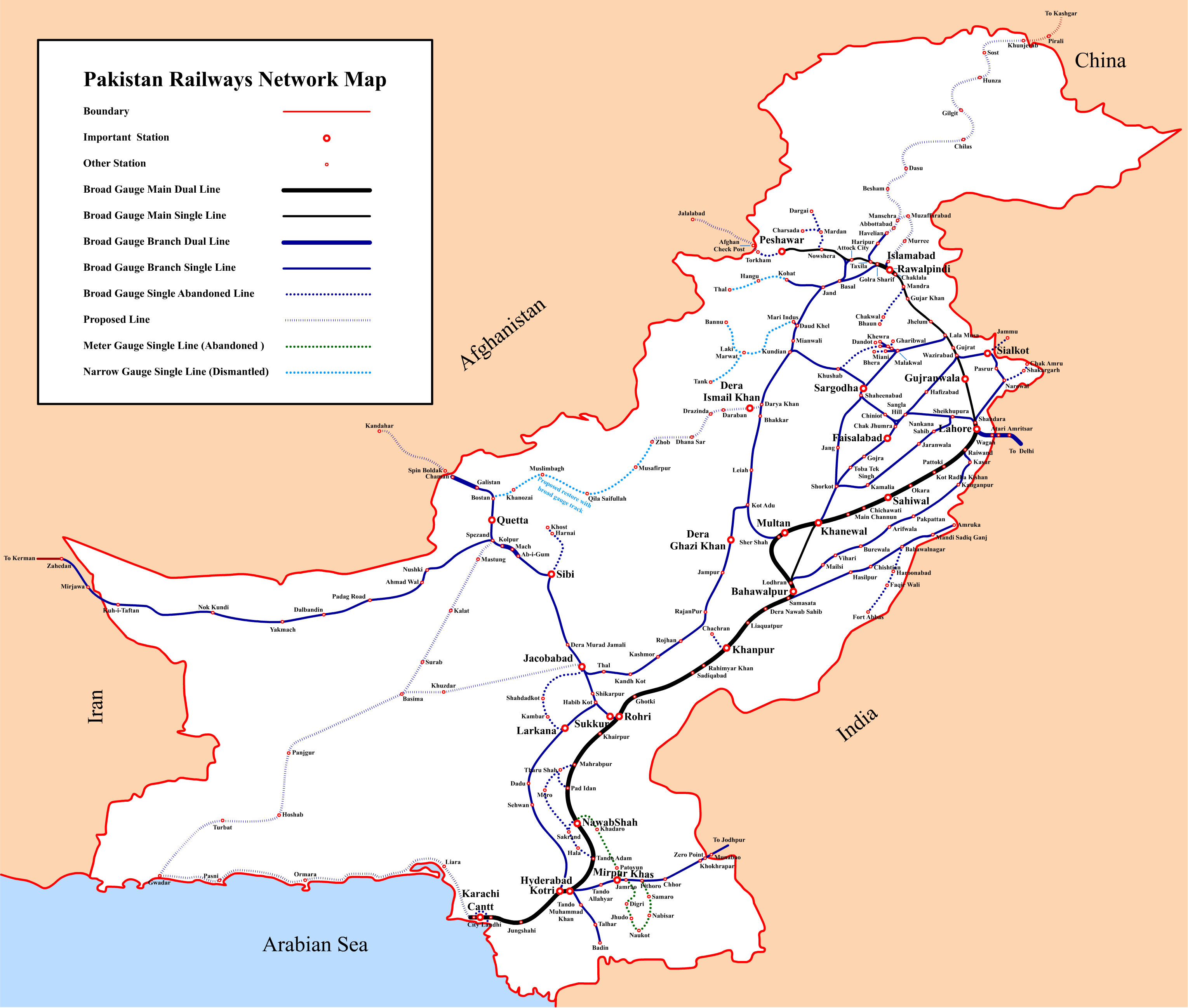

Pakistan Railways (Note: Urdu: پاکستان ریلویز; reporting mark: PR) is the state-owned railway operator in Pakistan. Founded in 1886 as the North Western State Railway and headquartered in Lahore, it owns 7,791 kilometres (4,841 miles) of operational track, stretching from Peshawar to Karachi, offering both freight and passenger services, covering 494 operational stations across Pakistan.

In 2014, the Ministry of Railways launched Pakistan Railways Vision 2026, which seeks to increase PR's share in Pakistan's transportation sector from 4% to 20%, using the Rs. 886.68 billion (US$3.2 billion) China–Pakistan Economic Corridor rail upgrade. The plan includes building new locomotives, development and improvement of current rail infrastructure, an increase in average train speed, improved on-time performance and expansion of passenger services. The first phase of the project was completed in 2017, and the second phase is scheduled for completion by 2021. Among them is the ML-1 project, which will be completed in three phases at a cost of Rs. 1.11 trillion (US$4.0 billion). Until October 2022, these projects have not started construction or tendering.

Pakistan Railways is an active member of the International Union of Railways. In the 2023–24 financial year, Pakistan Railways carried 42.1 million passengers and 5.7 million tonnes of freight. Currently, it is suffering from poor maintenance.

Mazhar Ali Shah is the current federal secretary and chairman for Pakistan Railways.

== History ==
=== North-Western State Railway (1886–1905) ===
In 1855, during the British Raj, several railway companies began laying track and operating in Sindh and Punjab. The country's railway system was originally a patchwork of local rail lines operated by small, private companies, including the Scinde Railway, Punjab Railway, Delhi Railway and Indus Flotilla. In 1870, the four companies combined to form the Scinde, Punjab & Delhi Railway. Several other rail lines were soon built, including the Indus Valley State Railway, Punjab Northern State Railway, Sind–Sagar Railway, Sind–Pishin State Railway, Trans–Baluchistan Railway and Kandahar State Railway. These six companies merged with the Scinde, Punjab & Delhi Railway to form the North Western State Railway in 1886.

=== North-Western Railway (1905–1961) ===
The North Western State Railway was renamed as North Western Railway in 1905.

Following the partition of British India and independence of Pakistan in 1947, most of the North Western Railway infrastructure became part of the Pakistani territory. The country adopted 8,122 km (5,047 mi) of the North Western State Railway; 6,880 km (4,280 mi) was 1,676 mm (5 ft 6 in), 506 kilometres (314 mi) was 1,000 mm (3 ft 3 3/8 in) metre gauge, and 736 kilometres (457 mi) was 762 mm (2 ft 6 in) narrow gauge.

In 1954, a branch line was extended from the Karachi–Peshawar Railway Line to Mardan and Charsada. Two years later, the Jacobabad–Kashmore metre-gauge line was converted to 5 ft 6 in (1,676 mm) broad gauge.

=== Pakistan Western Railway (1961–1974) ===
On 1 February 1961, the North-Western Railway was renamed the Pakistan Western Railway. In East Bengal, the portion of the Assam Bengal Railway in Pakistani territory was renamed the Pakistan Eastern Railway.

The Kot Adu–Kashmore section of the Kotri–Attock Railway Line was built from 1969 to 1973, providing an alternate route from Karachi to northern Pakistan.

=== Pakistan Railways (1974–present) ===
In 1974, Pakistan Western Railways was renamed Pakistan Railways. In February 2006, the 126-kilometre (78 mi) Hyderabad–Khokhrapar Branch Line was converted to 5 ft 6 in (1,676 mm). All narrow-gauge tracks in the country were converted to broad gauge or dismantled during the 2000s. On 8 January 2016, the Lodhran–Raiwind Branch Line double-rail project was completed.

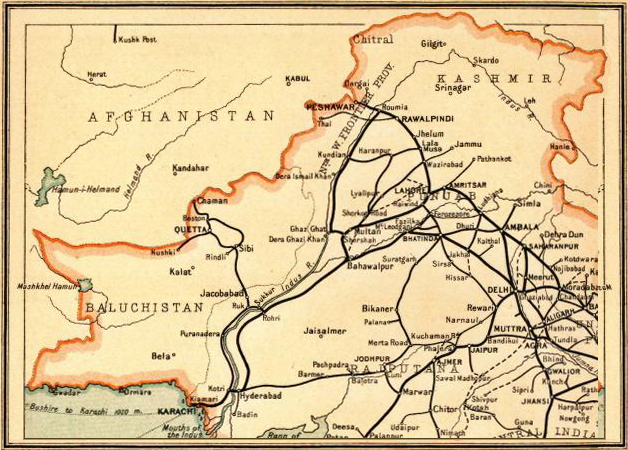
An 1890s map of the North Western State Railway

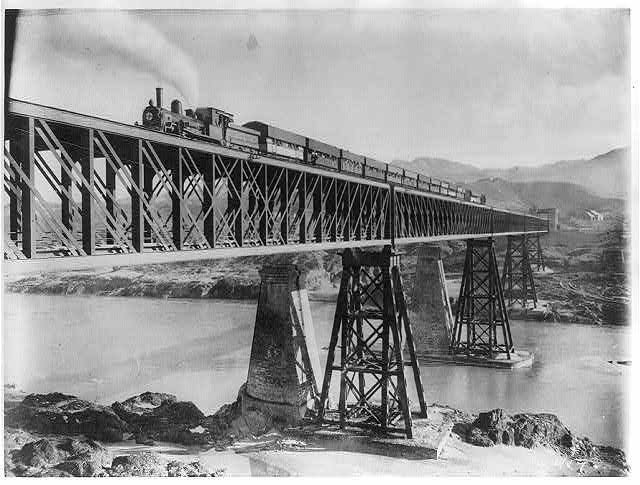
Attock Bridge over the Indus River in 1895

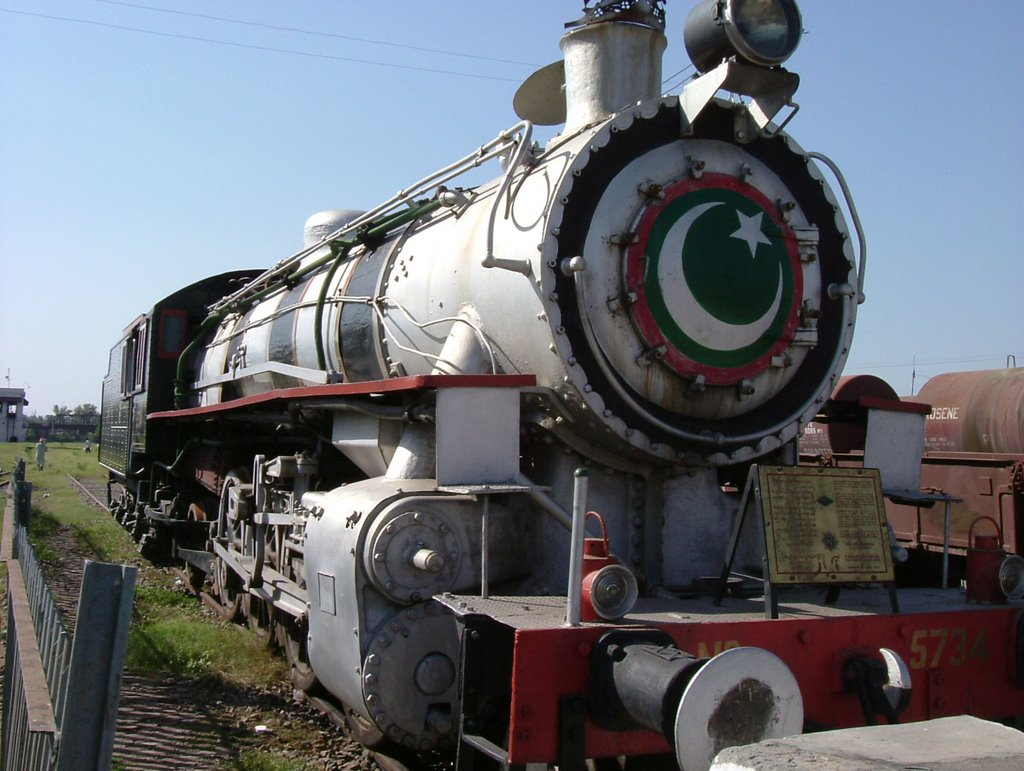
A 1932 steam locomotive at Rawalpindi railway station

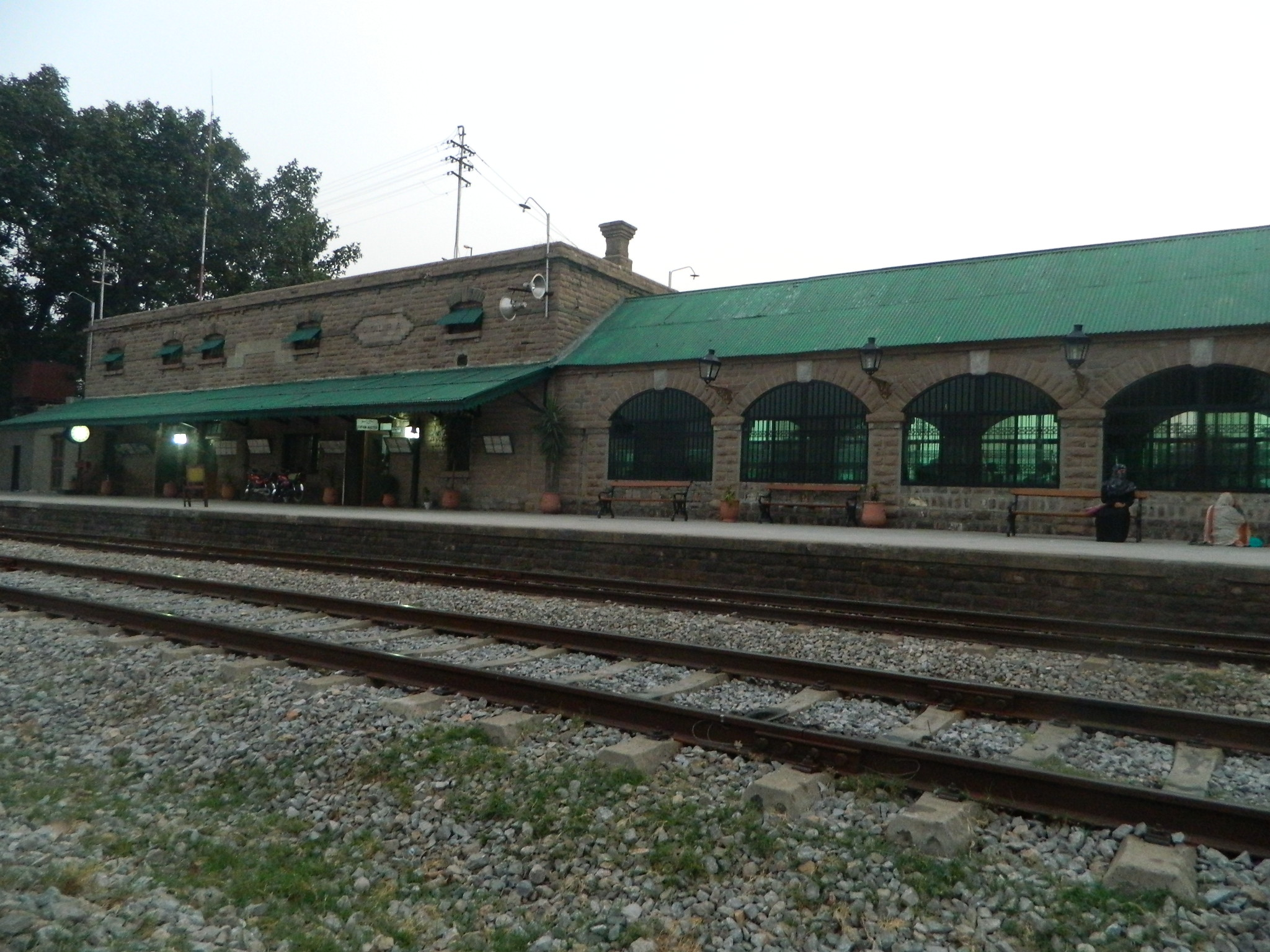
Golra Sharif Railway Museum and station in Islamabad

== Structure ==
Pakistan Railways is a state-owned enterprise under the Ministry of Railways (MoR) of the government of Pakistan, tasked with and primarily responsible for planning, administering and establishing passenger rail service and regulating railway companies and industries. Pakistan Railways policy and development are administered by the ministry. From 1947 to 1959, the Pakistan Western Railway and Pakistan Eastern Railway were administered by the Railway Division of the Ministry of Communications, headed by the Director General of Railways (DG Railways) in the ministry. In 1959, an ordinance was passed by Parliament outlining the need for a semi-autonomous railway board. The board was conceived in accordance with the principal powers of the central government as stipulated in the Railways Act IX of 1890. After the first session of the third national assembly, President Muhammad Ayub Khan issued Presidential Order 33 on 9 June 1962. The order directed the transfer of control of both railways (PWR and PER) from the central government to the provincial governments of West Pakistan and East Pakistan, respectively. When PO 33 came into effect on 1 July 1962, railway boards were established by both provinces (repealing the Railway Board Ordinance of 1959).

The presidential order reinstated a separation convention that began in the fiscal year 1961–62, which kept railway finances separate from general finances and gave each board more autonomy. In 1974, the Ministry of Railways was established to handle planning, policy-making, technical advice, and management of the railway. In 1982, a presidential order merged the Ministry of Railways with the Railway Board, creating a federal ministry.

=== Railway Board ===
The Railway Board, in existence from 1959 to 2000, was modified with an executive committee from 2000 and 2014. The Railway Board was reconstituted on 20 February 2015. The Board members are:

- Federal Secretary Railways (Chairman of Board)
- Federal Secretary Communications
- Finance Secretary of Pakistan
- Planning and Development Secretary of Pakistan
- General Manager Railways (Operations)
- General Manager Railways (Manufacturing and Services)
- Member Finance, Ministry of Railways

=== Units and divisions ===
Pakistan Railways has three functional units: operations, manufacturing and welfare and special initiatives. The operations unit is divided into three main departments. The Infrastructure Department oversees civil engineering, signaling, telecommunications, design and the directorate of property. The Mechanical Engineering Department oversees mechanical engineering, purchasing, stores and electrical engineering, and the Traffic Department oversees passenger facilities, operations, marketing and the directorate of information technology. Several smaller departments, including personnel, railway police, planning, legal affairs, public relations and the Pakistan Railways Academy, are also part of the operations unit.

The railway has seven territorial operating divisions:

1. Pakistan Railways Karachi Division
2. Pakistan Railways Sukkur Division
3. Pakistan Railways Multan Division
4. Pakistan Railways Lahore Division
5. Pakistan Railways Rawalpindi Division
6. Pakistan Railways Peshawar Division
7. Pakistan Railways Quetta Division

In addition to these seven divisions, the Mughulpura Division in Lahore is primarily engaged with maintenance of rolling stock.

== Rolling stock ==
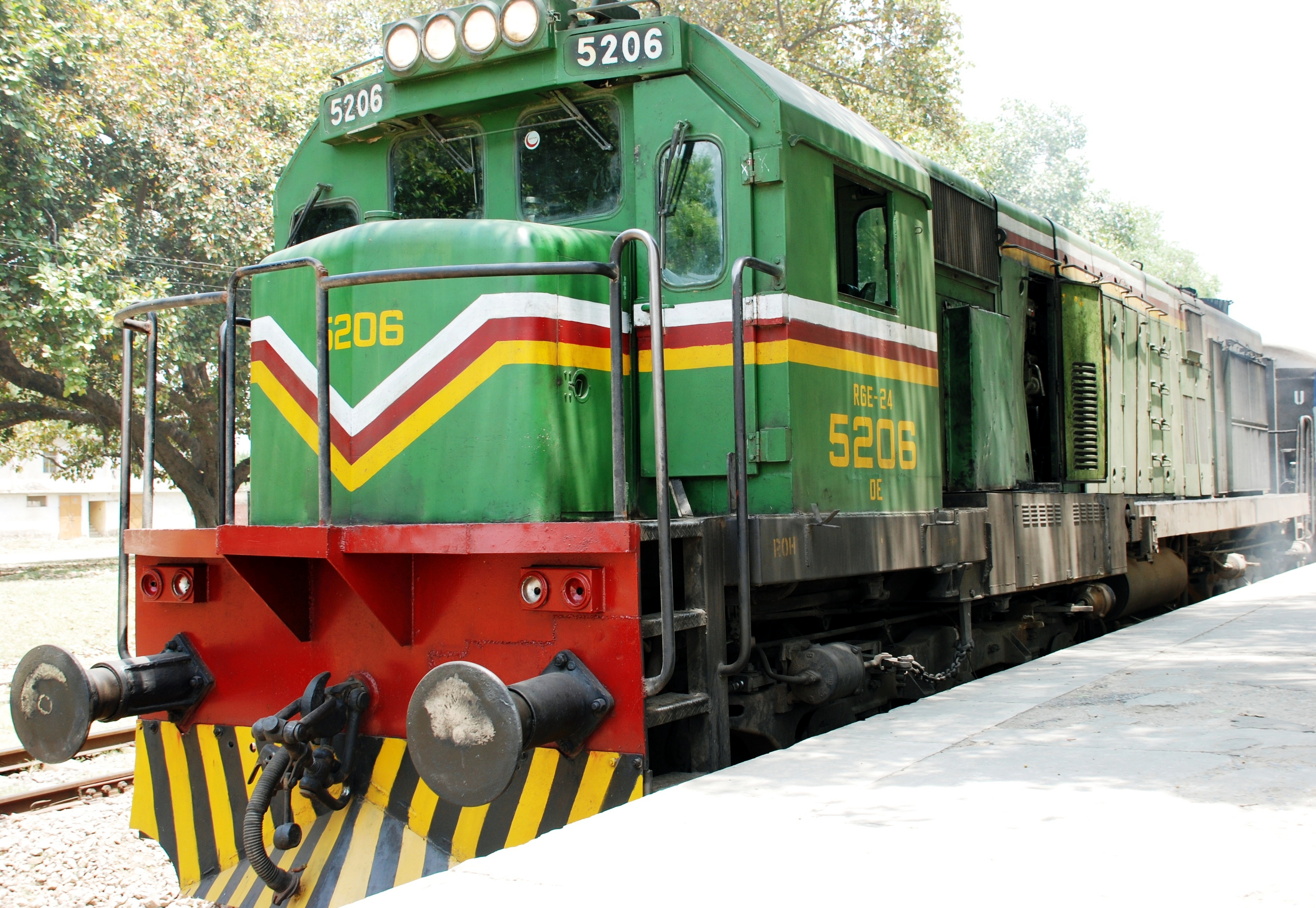
A Pakistan Railways diesel locomotive

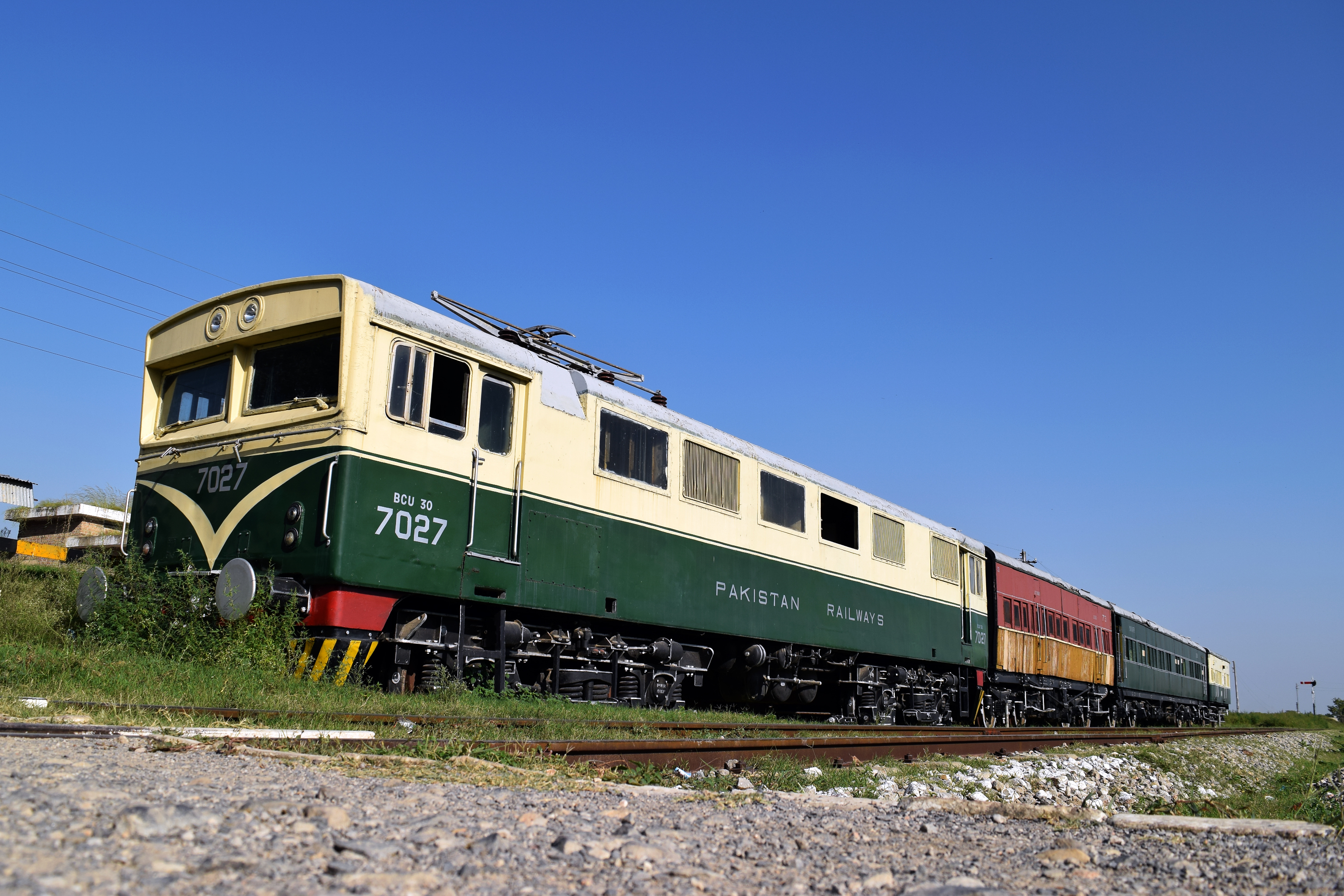
A Pakistan Railways electric locomotive

Pakistan Railways has 190 working diesel-electric locomotives. The average life of the fleet is 25 years, and they are serviced at the Pakistan Locomotive Factory.

In January 2016, the railway ordered 800 hopper wagons from Jinan Railway Vehicles Equipment. The first 205 wagons will be built in China, and the remaining 595 wagons will be assembled at the Moghalpura Railway Workshops in Pakistan. The wagons will carry coal to power stations in Karachi and Qadirabad.

In 2017, 55 additional locomotives (4000 horsepower) manufactured in the United States were added to the Pakistan Railways fleet.

In July 2025, the operator decided to hand over the commercial management of 11 trains to the private sector in an effort to improve travel facilities and increase revenue. These included Hazara Express, Bahauddin Zakaria Express, Millat Express, Subak Kharam Express, Rawal Express, Badar Express, Ghori Express, Ravi Express, Thall Express, Faiz Ahmed Faiz Passenger, and Mohenjo Daro Passenger. The infrastructure and regulatory control of the trains were retained by Pakistan Railways, however.

== Manufacturing ==
=== Pakistan Locomotive Factory Risalpur ===
The Pakistan Locomotive Factory was established in Risalpur in 1993 at a cost of Rs. 228.4 million (US$820,000). Its function is to manufacture indigenous diesel electric and electric locomotives, thus allowing Pakistan Railways to have less dependency on foreign technology. The factory has capacity to manufacture 25 locomotives per year. Technology for manufacturing of locomotives has been acquired from Hitachi Japan, General Electric, ADtranz Germany and Dalian Locomotives & Rolling Stock Works, China.

=== Carriage Factory Islamabad ===
Pakistan Railways Carriage Factory, Islamabad was set up in 1970 under the technical collaboration of LHB, Germany for manufacture of passenger carriages. The capacity of the Factory is 150 passenger coaches per year on single shift basis.

=== Moghalpura Railway Workshops ===
The Moghalpura Railway Workshops, on the Lahore–Wagah Branch Line at Moghalpura Junction railway station (MGPR) in Lahore, are one of several rolling-stock repair sites. The workshop complex emerged at its present site in 1904 to manufacture, repair and overhaul passenger coaches and freight wagons for the North Western State Railway. In 1947, it was the only state-of-the-art workshop for Pakistan Railways. After partition, the Moghalpura Railway Workshops continued to host some 14,000 workers specializing in engineering skills.

=== Concrete Sleeper Factories ===
The railway owns four concrete sleeper factories in Sukkur, Khanewal, Kohat, and Kotri. The first factory was established in Sukkur in 1967, and the other three factories were opened between 1981. A fifth factory, at Shaheenabad, was closed in 1996 due to financial constraints and the scarcity of water.

== Network ==
=== Lines ===
The Pakistan Railways network is divided into main lines and branch lines. The Karachi–Peshawar Line is the main north-south line, and the Rohri–Chaman Line is the main east-west line.

==== Main lines ====
- Main Line 1 (ML-1) Karachi–Peshawar Line
- Main Line 2 (ML-2) Kotri–Attock Line
- Main Line 3 (ML-3) Rohri–Chaman Line
- Main Line 4 (ML-4) Quetta–Taftan Line
- Main Line 5 (ML-5) Taxila–Khunjerab Line

==== Branch lines ====
- Hyderabad–Khokhrapar Branch Line
- Sher Shah–Kot Addu Branch Line
- Lodhran–Khanewal Branch Line
- Lodhran–Raiwind Branch Line
- Khanewal–Wazirabad Branch Line
- Shorkot–Sheikhupura Branch Line
- Shorkot–Lalamusa Branch Line
- Jand-Thal Branch Line
- Nowshera–Dargai Railway
- Daud Khel–Lakki Marwat Branch Line
- Malakwal–Khushab Branch Line
- Sangla Hill–Kundian Branch Line
- Lahore–Wagah Branch Line
- Shahdara Bagh–Sangla Hill Branch Line
- Shahdara Bagh–Chak Amru Branch Line
- Wazirabad–Narowal Branch Line
- Golra Sharif–Basal Branch Line
- Sibi-Zardalu Branch Line

=== Tracks ===
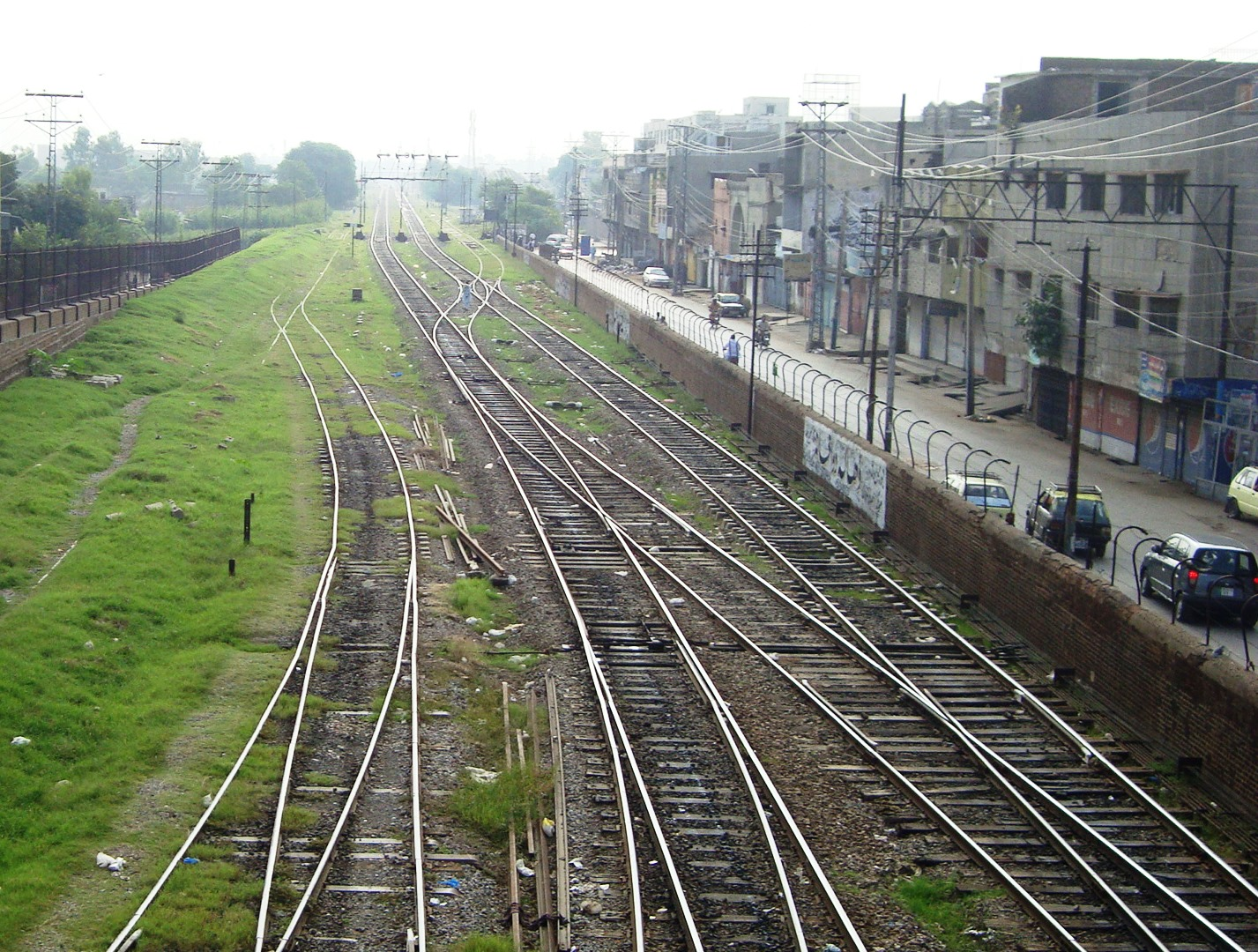
Tracks at Rawalpindi station

The Pakistan Railways network comprises 7,791 route-kilometres (7,479 km of broad gauge and 312 km of metre gauge). There are 1,043 km of double-track sections (in total).

The broad-gauge track axle load limit is 22.86 tonnes, except for the Rohri–Chaman Line (limit 17.78 tonnes) and Quetta–Taftan Line (limit 17.27 tonnes). The maximum speed on most lines is 105 kilometres per hour (65 mph), but upgraded sections of the Karachi–Peshawar Line allow speeds up to 120 kilometres per hour (75 mph). In future, Pakistan Railways aim to upgrade all main lines to 160 kilometres per hour (99 mph).

=== Electrification ===
The Lahore–Khanewal line was electrified at 25 kV AC, but electric service had ceased by 2011. The theft of overhead wire was cited as a reason. The future electrification with 25 kV AC requiring minimum overhead wiring height must be 7.45 m (24 ft 5 in) above top of rail and minimum track center spacing must be 5.3 m (17 ft 5 in), and platform height must be no more than 200 mm (7.9 in) above top of rail, to prevent catenary thefts.

=== Rail links with adjacent countries ===
- Iran – Pakistan Railways is connected to the Islamic Republic of Iran Railways at Zahedan, where a break-of-gauge exists between the 1,676 mm (5 ft 6 in) Quetta–Taftan Line and the 1,435 mm (4 ft 8 1/2 in) Kerman–Zahedan line. The link was completed on 18 May 2007.
- Afghanistan – Presently there is no rail link to Afghanistan, but Pakistan Railways has proposed to help build an Afghan rail network in three phases. Phase one would stretch from the Chaman to Spin Boldak as an extension of the Rohri–Chaman Line. Phase two would extend the line from Spin Boldak to Kandahar. Phase three would run from Kandahar to Herat and Khushka, Turkmenistan, linking the 1,676 mm (5 ft 6 in) with the Central Asian 1,520 mm (4 ft 11 27/32 in). It is unknown where the break-of-gauge station would be. Another proposal would extend the Karachi–Peshawar Line to Kabul via Jalalabad.
- Turkmenistan via Afghanistan – Proposed, avoiding the intervening 1,435 mm (4 ft 8 1/2 in) gauge
- China – There is no present rail link with China. On 28 February 2007, contracts were awarded for feasibility studies on the Taxila–Khunjerab Line, extending it from Havelian via the Khunjerab Pass to the Chinese railhead at Kashgar, a distance of about 750 kilometres (470 mi).
- Turkey – The completion of the Pakistan–Iran link has made it possible, in principle, to run trains between Pakistan and Turkey via Iran. A container train trial service was begun by Prime Minister Yusuf Raza Gilani between Islamabad and Istanbul on 14 August 2009. The first train carried 20 containers with a capacity of about 750 t (738 long tons; 827 short tons), and was scheduled to travel 6,500 km (4,000 mi) from Islamabad through Tehran to Istanbul. An Istanbul–Tehran–Islamabad passenger rail service has also been proposed. In 2009, Minister for Railways Ghulam Ahmad Bilour expressed the hope that after the container-train trial a passenger train would be introduced. There are also hopes that the route would link Europe and Central Asia and carry passengers.
- India – Two rail links to India exist: the Thar Express from Jodhpur, Rajasthan to Karachi and the Samjhauta Express from Delhi to Lahore. The more rail links (including reopening) being proposed.
- Russia – Proposed 1,676 mm (5 ft 6 in) Indian broad-gauge corridors extension via Central Asia.

== Service ==
=== Passenger service ===
Passenger traffic is 50 percent of total annual revenue; in 1999–2000, this amounted to Rs. 4.8 billion (US$17 million). Pakistan Railways carried 52.2 million passengers in 2016 and operates 28 mail, express and passenger trains. The railway carries a daily average of 178,000 people, and provides special trains for Eid al-Fitr, Eid al-Adha, Independence Day and Raiwind Ijtema. It set up a website during the early 2000s to provide travelers with up-to-date information about seat availability, departures and arrivals. Online ticket purchase was added to the website in 2016, with reservations confirmed by SMS. Wi-Fi service is included on the Green Line Express.

	2004	2005	2006	2007	2008	2009	2010	2011	2012	2013	2014	2015	2016	2017	2018
Passengers (millions)	72.8	81.4	83.8	79.9	82.5	74.9	64.9	41.0	41.9	47.6	48.5	50.9	52.2	52.4	60.0

=== Freight service ===
Pakistan Railways was the predominant mode of freight transportation from coastal ports to the interior. At their peak, between 1955 and 1960, PR handled 73 percent of the country's freight traffic (compared to less than four percent in 2015). The Freight Business Unit operates over 200 freight stations, including the Port of Karachi and Bin Qasim Port, and several dry ports in Pakistan's four provinces. With 12,000 employees, the unit generates revenue from the movement of agricultural, industrial and imported products such as petroleum oil and lubricants, wheat, coal, fertilizer, rock phosphate, cement and sugar from the ports to the interior.

On 14 August 2009, Prime Minister Yusuf Raza Gilani launched a freight train between Islamabad and Istanbul via Tehran. The first train carried 20 containers with a capacity of 750 t (738 long tons; 827 short tons), and made the 6,500 km (4,000 mi) trip from Islamabad to Tehran and Istanbul in two weeks. In 2015, freight carried by Pakistan Railways increased significantly to 3.3 million tons.

On 22 February 2020, the first cargo train bound for Afghanistan left the Pakistan International Container Terminal in Karachi, with a load of 35 containers. The goods were transported to the city of Chaman, neighbouring Afghanistan, and passed over the border by road.

	2011	2012	2013	2014	2015	2016	2017	2018	2019	2020	2021	2022	2023
Freight carried (million tonnes)	1.75	0.40	0.42	1.09	3.30	4.77	5.63	8.40	8.30	7.41	8.20	8.00	4.29

=== Travel Classes ===
Pakistan Railways has several classes of travel. Depending on the route, some trains have one class. Fares for the classes vary, with unreserved seating the least expensive. The following table lists the classes and codes:

Class	Code
AC Sleeper	ACSL
AC Parlour	PC
AC Business	ACLZ
AC Standard	ACL
First Class Sleeper	ISL
Economy Class	EC
Second Class	SEC

=== Heritage ===
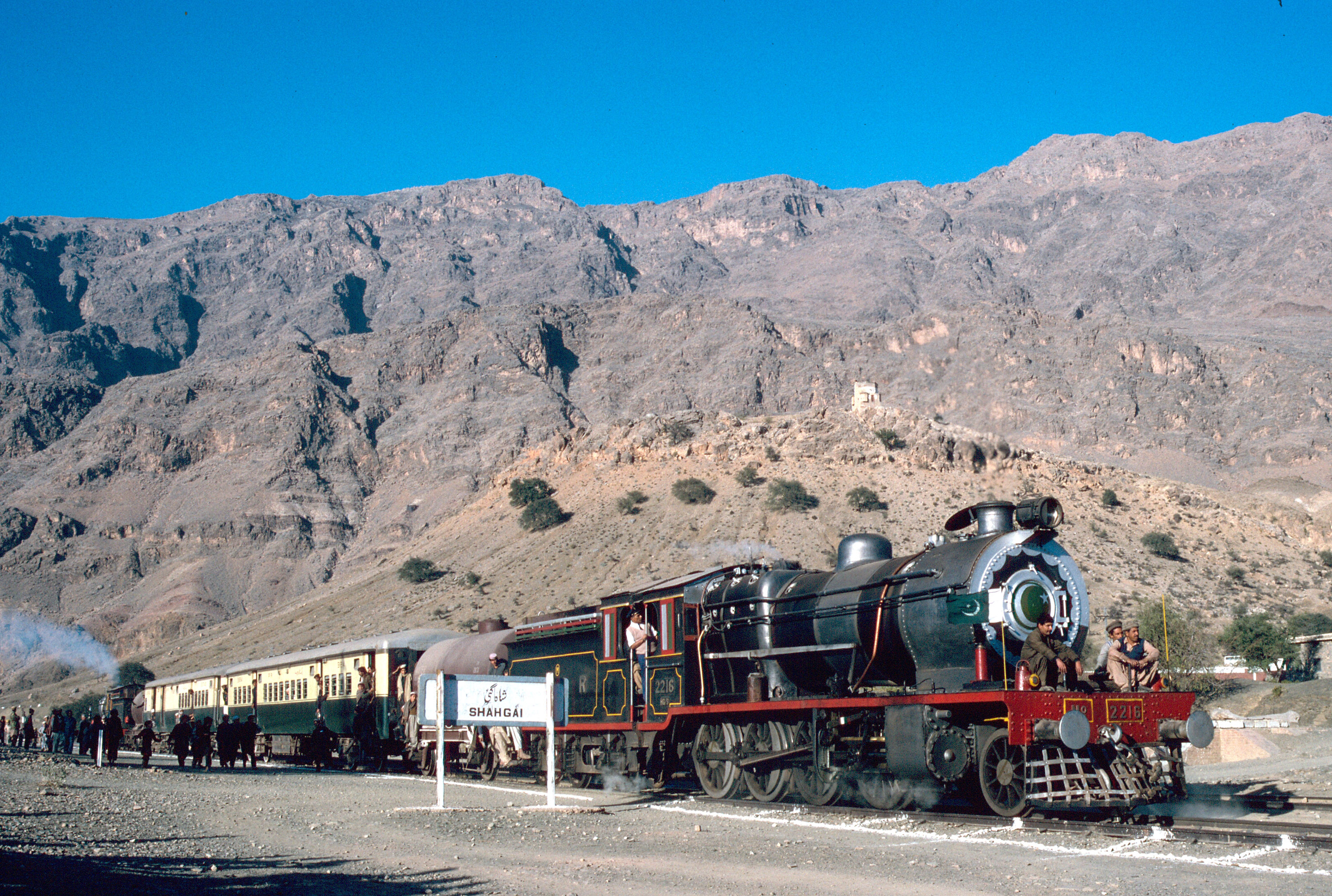
Khyber train safari at Shahgai station

In Ghangha Pur, a 2 ft (610 mm) narrow-gauge horse-drawn tramway is operational. It was first opened in 1898, closed in 1998, and re-opened in 2010. and soon abandoned again.

The Khyber train safari is a defunct steam operated train between Peshawar and Attock Khurd. It was first opened in 1925, suspended in 1982, reopened in 1996 as Khyber steam safari, suspended again in 2006 and finally reopened in 2015 with present name and soon abandoned again. A documentary film of the railway featuring its steam locomotives was made by Nick Lera in 1997 with the title Pakistan - Rails to the North West Frontier.

== Accidents and incidents ==
Train accidents are common in Pakistan.

- Sukkur rail disaster: Occurred on 4 January 1990 in the village of Sangi, near Sukkur in Sindh province. In Pakistan's worst rail disaster, 307 people were killed. The Bahauddin Zakaria Express, on an 800-kilometre (500 mi) overnight run from Multan to Karachi, carried many more passengers in its 16 carriages than its 1,408-seat capacity. The train was supposed to pass through the village of Sangi, but incorrectly-set points sent it into a siding and it struck an empty 67-car freight train at a speed of at least 56 km/h (35 mph).
- 2005 Ghotki rail crash: In PR's worst accident in recent years, three passenger trains collided on 13 July 2005. Thirteen carriages derailed, and over 120 people were killed. The Karachi Express struck the rear of the Quetta Express while it was stopped at a station near Ghotki, and the Tezgam (travelling in the opposite direction) struck several of the derailed carriages. According to officials, the conductor of the Karachi Express misread a signal.
- Super Parcel Express derailment: On 21 August 2005, the upcountry Super Parcels Express derailed while crossing the Malir Bridge near Landhi in Karachi Division. Eight bogies were seriously damaged when an axle broke due to overloading, and rail traffic was suspended for 24 hours; all trains were terminated and turned around at Landhi.
- Mehrabpur derailment: The Karachi Express, from Karachi to Lahore, derailed near the town of Mehrabpur in Sindh on 19 December 2007. At about 2:25 a.m. local time, fourteen of the train's sixteen carriages left the tracks; some were mangled by the crash, and others slid down an embankment into water. Sabotage and terrorism were ruled out as reasons for the derailment, with officials blaming faulty track.
- 2011 Bolan Mail bombing: On 29 July 2011, five bogies of the Bolan Mail coming from Karachi to Quetta were derailed and 300 feet of track damaged as a result of an explosion near the Marri Farm in Dera Allah Yar. The Baloch Republican Army took responsibility for the attack.
- 2012 Bolan Mail collision: On 16 November 2012, the driver of Bolan Mail was injured when the train accidentally collided with another engine near Kotri Railway Station. Bolan Mail had a clear signal to proceed, but it struck a halted engine on the same track.
- 2015 Bolan Mail derailment: On 17 June 2015, several passengers were injured when five cars of the Quetta-bound Bolan Mail derailed near Madeji. Cracks in the Dadu Canal dyke had made a hole beneath the track, which resulted in the accident.
- 2015 Gujranwala derailment: On 2 July 2015, three carriages of a special train fell into a canal and another derailed near Gujranwala. Nineteen people were killed.
- Aab-e-Gum derailment: On 17 November 2015, the Jaffar Express derailed at Aab-e-Gum in Balochistan. Twenty people were killed.
- Karachi rail crash: The Bahauddin Zakaria Express collided with the Fareed Express (parked at Landhi railway station) on 3 November 2016, killing 21 people.
- 2017 Mehr Express derailment: On 23 December 2017, a Multan-bound Mehr Express collided with a trailer truck carrying sugarcane produce. At least four people were injured.
- On 17 September 2018, a distressing incident occurred when the Peshawar-bound Khushhal Khan Khattak Express derailed in a hilly area between the Massan railway station and Sawan Bridge, approximately 45 km (27.3 mi) from the location. Seven coaches along with the locomotive were involved in the derailment, resulting in injuries to twenty-one passengers. Rescue 1122 reported that one of the injured passengers was admitted to the Kalabagh tehsil headquarters hospital in critical condition. According to a railways press release, twenty passengers sustained injuries, with four of them being admitted to the Mianwali DHQ hospital for treatment.
- On 17 March 2019, a tragic incident occurred near Nasirabad when the railway track was deliberately blown up, causing five carriages of the Jaffar Express to derail. This resulted in the loss of at least five lives, with eight individuals sustaining injuries. The Jaffar Express was en route to Quetta at the time of the incident. Following the derailment, rescue teams promptly arrived at the scene to assist the victims and transport them to nearby hospitals for medical treatment. The explosion not only caused damage to the railway track but also disrupted the movement of other trains in the area.
- Sadiqabad railway accident: On 11 July 2019, the Akbar Express hit a parked cargo train at Walhar railway station, resulting in the death of 21 people and 100 injuries. Minister for Railways Sheikh Rasheed Ahmad also expressed grief over the loss of precious lives caused by the accident. He announced compensation of Rs2 million for the families of the deceased and Rs1.5 million each for the injured.
- 2019 Tezgam train fire: On 31 October 2019, at least 75 people died after a fire broke out in the Tezgam Express—travelling from Karachi to Rawalpindi—after a gas canister reportedly exploded on board as the train was passing through Rahim Yar Khan. The fire started after passengers started cooking on the train, and the resulting inferno destroyed three economy-class carriages of the train. A witness claimed that the fire could not be attributed to the gas cylinder blast since all the cylinders were emptied at the station. Many of the victims died when they jumped from the moving train to escape the inferno.
- 2020 Sheikhupura level crossing accident: On 3 July 2020, at least 20 people died and ten others were injured mostly members of the Pakistani Sikh community in the Shah Hussain Express collided with a bus near Sachcha Sauda railway station in Sheikhupura District.
- 2021 Ghotki rail crash: On 7 June 2021, at least 62 people died and 200 others were injured so far in a collision between the Millat Express and the Sir Syed Express.
- The 2022 Jaffar Express bombing occurred on 19 January 2022, when a bomb blast derailed four carriages of the Jaffar Express train traveling from Quetta to Rawalpindi. Six passengers were injured in the powerful explosion, according to Pakistan Railways officials.
- On 25 April 2022, a collision between the Bolan Mail and a goods train in Balochistan resulted in four injuries. The incident occurred in the Peeru Kunri Post area of Kachhi. The Bolan Mail, en route from Karachi to Quetta, collided with the goods train, causing three carriages of the train to derail from the track. Injured passengers were promptly transported to a nearby hospital for medical treatment, as reported by Levies sources.
- 2023 Hazara Express derailment: At least 30 were killed and over 80 injured after as many as 10 bogies of Havelian-bound Hazara Express derailed Sunday near Sahara Railway Station in Sindh's Nawabshah district, 275 kilometres (170.8 miles) away from Karachi. The reason behind the derailment as cited by the Railway Minister Khawaja Saad Rafique was strained wooden sleepers.
- 2025 Jaffar Express Hijacking: 31 people were killed after Balochistan Liberation Army insurgents hijacked a Jaffar Express train bound for Peshawar. The hijackers had blown up the tracks so that the train would stop, then boarded the train, killed 21 people.

== Future ==
=== New lines ===
New rail lines have been proposed by Pakistan Railways to connect Gwadar Port to Central Asia, including:

- Karachi–Gwadar Railway Line (Makran Railway)
- Gwadar–Mastung Branch Line
- Basima–Jacobabad Branch Line
- Bostan–Zhob–Dera Ismail Khan Branch Line
- Islamabad–Muzaffarabad Branch Line
- Jhang Sadar–Risalewala Branch Line

=== Breaks of gauge ===
- In Pakistan: 1,676 mm (5 ft 6 in)–1,435 mm (4 ft 8 1/2 in) at Gwadar Port
- Outside Pakistan: 1,676 mm (5 ft 6 in)–1,520 mm (4 ft 11 27/32 in) at Mazar-i-Sharif, Afghanistan and 1,676 mm (5 ft 6 in)–1,435 mm (4 ft 8 1/2 in) at Kashgar, China

=== Track-doubling project ===
Over 1,409 kilometres (876 mi) of tracks have been doubled since the track-doubling project began in the 1990s. Sections of the Karachi–Peshawar Line were first doubled, since it was the country's busiest and longest line.

==== Karachi–Peshawar Line ====
- Kiamari–Shahdara Bagh Junction: 1,275 kilometres (792 mi)
- Chaklala–Golra Sharif Junction: 20 kilometres (12 mi)

==== Rohri–Chaman Line ====
- Aab-e-Gum–Kolpur: 37 kilometres (23 mi)
- Gulistan–Chaman: 60 kilometres (37 mi)

==== Lahore–Wagah Branch Line ====
- Lahore Junction–Wagah: 23 kilometres (14 mi)

=== Restructuring ===
In March 2010, the Pakistani government announced plans to privatise Pakistan Railways and split it into four businesses focusing on passenger operations, freight, infrastructure and manufacturing. In February 2010, "unbundling" was proposed the previous month, with activities being outsourced, privatised, or operated separately. However, complete privatisation has been ruled out.

=== Public-private partnership ===
Pakistan Railways has faced financial and management crisis, and has met with private operators. Several trains are a public-private partnership. The Pakistan Business Express train made its first run on 3 February 2012, and the Shalimar Express resumed operation on 25 February of that year.

In July 2025, Pakistan Railways once again issued tenders to outsource operations of 11 passenger trains to the private sector, including Hazara Express, Millat Express, and Thal Express. However, this move follows a failed earlier attempt, where only two bids were received—both for a single train, Shalimar Express while the rest saw no interest. The renewed effort highlights the dire financial state of Pakistan Railways and the broader economic crisis, as even private firms remain unwilling to invest in the ailing national transport system.

=== China–Pakistan Economic Corridor ===
China is involved in the development of Pakistan Railways, and has been increasing its stake in Pakistan's communications sector. Freight and passenger service make up 50 percent of the railway's total revenue. Pakistan Railways carries 65 million passengers annually and operates 228 mail, express and passenger trains daily. It introduced new mail and express trains between major terminals from 2003 to 2005. The railway has entered developmental agreements with Chinese rail companies. In 2001, Pakistan Railways signed a $91.89 million contract with China National Machinery Import and Export Corporation to manufacture 175 high-speed passenger coaches. The project was funded by Exim Bank of China on a supplier-credit basis. Forty passenger coaches have been received, and 105 were scheduled to be assembled in Pakistan Railways' carriage factory. The coaches are in use on Pakistan Railways' Rawalpindi–Lahore–Karachi, Lahore–Faisalabad and Rawalpindi–Quetta mail and express trains. The manufacturing kits for the remaining 30 coaches have been received, and 12 are assembled. The technology transfer for the coaches was obtained from China's Changchun Car Company.

Pakistan Railways purchased 69 locomotives, 15 of which are in use by the railway, as part of a 2003 agreement with China. The remaining 54 are scheduled to be built at Pakistan Railways' locomotive factory. The Chinese locomotives are 37 percent less expensive than European locomotives. Although some Pakistani observers have criticised faulty locomotives purchased by Pakistan Railways from Dongfang Electric of China, the railway decided to purchase 45 more 2,000–3,000-horsepower locomotives from Dongfang. The company is willing to redesign the 30 delivered locomotives, strengthening their underframes and reducing their weight below 140 tons each. The Beijing Research and Design Institute is committed to provide 300 rail cars to Pakistan Railways.

According to a 2004 agreement with China National Machinery and Equipment Group, the Chinese company would begin the construction of Corridor 1 of a light-rail mass-transit system in Karachi which is intended to serve four million commuters. The project, costing about $568 million, would take four-and-a-half years to complete. The contract, awarded on a build–operate–transfer basis, consists of five corridors. Pakistan signed a series of agreements with China to expand the capability of its railway system. Under an agreement with China Railway, a Chinese company would provide 1,300 freight cars to Pakistan Railways; 420 would be manufactured in China, and the remaining 880 would be produced at the Moghalpura Railway Workshops in Lahore. In another project, 450 passenger coaches would be rehabilitated at an estimated cost of Rs2.14 billion. This would include air-conditioning 40 coaches, converting 10 power vans and providing 100 high-speed bogies; 30 would be imported from China, and 70 would be manufactured domestically on a transfer-of-technology basis. In a separate agreement, 175 new passenger coaches are being purchased from China.

As part of a $100 million agreement signed by Pakistan and China in November 2001, China is to export 69 locomotives to Pakistan to modernise the country's rail fleet. The new engines consume less fuel than older models, and cost less to maintain. The first 15 engines would be manufactured in China, and the remainder would be assembled in Pakistan with Chinese parts and technology. For a Rs7.2 billion project Sindh laying 78,000 tons of rails, China delivered 64,000 tons to Pakistan Railways. In Pakistan's case, CPEC has continually been discussed ever since its announcement back in 2015, despite the fact that there has not been a major development in years.

Main Railway Line-1 (ML-1)

The ML-1 railway line project is one of the biggest projects not only of CPEC Phase-II ($6.8 billion) but of Pakistan's recent history in terms of logistics and communications. Since the partition of British India into India and Pakistan this is the single biggest expansion of the railway system. It spans a total distance of 1,872 km from Karachi to Peshawar. It covers 184 railway stations and carries over 75% of country's cargo and passengers.

Once upgraded, the railway line will be installed with a computer-based signaling and control system—reducing the epidemic of railway accidents that has been seen across Pakistan. It follows all the international safety procedures and protocols to ensure safe operations of Pakistan Railway.

Main Railway Line-2 (ML-2)

The project is expected to cost approximately $3.4 billion, however, this amount may increase as the project progresses. ML-2 connects southern and northern Pakistan.

Main Railway Line-3 (ML-3)

Projected cost is expected to be in the range of $2–3 billion. ML-3 connects Rohri (Sindh) to Quetta (Balochistan) and is largely focused on enhancing connectivity between the western provinces and the interior regions of Pakistan.

==== Khunjareb Railway ====
Pakistan awarded a Rs. 72 million (US$1.2 million) contract to an international consortium to conduct a feasibility study for establishing a rail link with China to improve trade between the countries. The study will cover a 750-kilometre (470 mi) section between Havelian and the 15,520-foot-high (4,730 m) Khunjerab Pass over Mansehra District and the Karakoram Highway. Havellian is already linked with the Pakistani rail network; China would lay about 350 kilometres (220 mi) of track in China from Kashgar to the Khunjerab Pass, linking Pakistan with China's rail network (largely along the Karakoram Highway). By expanding its stake in Pakistan's rail sector, China can utilise the country's advantageous geographic position at the confluence of South, Central and West Asia. During the first week of February 2007, Pakistan Railways and Dongfang Electric signed an agreement to establish a rail link between Havellian and Khunjerab. The route from Havellian and Khunjerab will probably include tunnels. The pre-feasibility study was completed in July 2011.

==== Gwadar link ====
As part of the development plan for its transport and communications network, Pakistan Railways has completed a feasibility study of the Chaman–Kandahar section for laying track between Pakistan and Turkmenistan through Afghanistan. A feasibility study for cost, engineering and design for the construction of a rail link from Gwadar to the existing rail network in Mastung district in Balochistan has been finalised. The link to the port of Gwadar will open underdeveloped areas of Balochistan to development. The chief aim of the venture is to connect the Central Asian republics with Pakistan Railways' network through Afghanistan.

China will benefit from Gwadar's accessible international trade routes to the Central Asian republics and China's Xinjiang border region. By extending its east-west railway from the Chinese border city of Kashgar to Peshawar in Pakistan's northwest, Beijing can trade freight to and from Gwadar along the shortest route (from Karachi to Peshawar). Pakistan's rail network could also supply oil from the Persian Gulf to Xinjiang and give China rail access to Iran.

== See also ==
- List of railway stations in Pakistan
- List of named passenger trains of Pakistan
- Abandoned and dismantled railway lines in Pakistan
- Karachi Circular Railway
- Transport in Pakistan
