= 2005 Ghotki rail crash =

2005 train crash in Pakistan

Coordinates: 28°02′13″N 69°25′02″E

Ghotki rail crash

Details
- Date: 13 July 2005
- Location: Ghotki
- Country: Pakistan
- Line: Karachi to Rawalpindi
- Operator: Pakistan Railways
- Incident type: Collision
- Cause: Incorrectly set points; Signal malfunction

Statistics
- Trains: 3
- Deaths: more than 100
- Injured: 1000

The Ghotki rail crash occurred on 13 July 2005, at around 3:40am local time (2240 July 12 UTC) near Ghotki, Pakistan. No. 24 Dn train (Quetta Express) stopped at the station of Sarhad was hit from behind by the following Karachi Express (No. 16 Dn) train, causing several cars to derail; these were then hit by a third train running in the opposite direction (Tezgam). A total of seventeen train cars, carrying over 3000 passengers, were wrecked. Estimates of the death toll ranged as high as over 130. It was the worst train accident in Pakistan in fifteen years.

== Accident ==
The Quetta Express was stopped at Sarhad station because of a fault in the brakes when the Karachi Express travelling from Lahore to Karachi on the same line half an hour later and moving at about 120 km/h (75 mph), collided with it from behind. An emergency brake application after the crew saw the tail light of the stopped train could not prevent the collision because of insufficient braking power; two coaches had been isolated from the train braking system. The collision caused at least three train cars to derail onto the opposite direction track, where they were subsequently hit by Tezgam, heading from Karachi to Rawalpindi. More cars were derailed by this second impact, bringing the total to thirteen. All three trains were full of passengers, as trains often are in Pakistan. a total of seventeen cars were wrecked, with over 3000 passengers.

The Ghotki crash was the worst rail accident in Pakistan since the 1990 Sukkur rail disaster. The exact number killed was not originally known; initial reports were of 109, 120, 127, or more than 130 deaths, with many critically injured.

== Causes ==
Initially the conductor or driver of the Karachi Express was believed to have missed or misread a signal, but subsequent investigations found that the signalling system was faulty and the crew had misjudged which signal was wrong. Also the points had not been set to direct the train to the loop line.

== See also ==
- List of railway accidents and incidents in Pakistan
