= Mehrabpur =

- City
- Mehrabpur Sindh Pakistan
- Location of Mehrabpur Mehrabpur (Pakistan) Mehrabpur (South Asia)
- Coordinates: 27.099444°N 68.420833°E
- Country: Pakistan
- Province: Sindh
- Elevation: 28 m (92 ft)

Population (2023 census)
  - Total: 57,978
- Time zone: UTC+5 (PST)
- Postal code: 67000
- Calling code: 0242
- Website: mehrabpursindh.com

Mehrabpur (Urdu: محراب پور), (Sindhi:محرابپور), is a city in the Naushahro Feroze District in the Sindh province of Pakistan. The city is administratively subdivided into 8 Union Councils.

It has a busy railway station on the main railway line between Karachi and Lahore. It is a junction station with a disused branch line to Naushahro Feroze.

== Demographics ==
Population

Historical population
Year	Pop.	±%
1972	9,643	—
1981	16,158	+67.6%
1998	30,686	+89.9%
2017	53,608	+74.7%
2023	57,978	+8.2%

According to 2023 census Mehrabpur population is 57,978.

Languages

Languages of Mehrabpur Town (2023 Census)
1. Sindhi (46.9%)
2. Urdu (28.3%)
3. Punjabi (22.6%)
4. Saraiki (1.10%)
5. Others (1.10%)

== Train crash ==
On 19 December 2007, at 2:30 am an overcrowded express train traveling from Karachi to Lahore derailed 2 km (1.2 mi) south of Mehrabpur killing over 49 people and injuring two hundreds more. The derailment seems to have been caused by defective rails.

== See also ==
- Rajkumar Hirani
- The Educators
