= Presidency of Zia-ul-Haq =

Pakistani presidential administration from 1978 to 1988

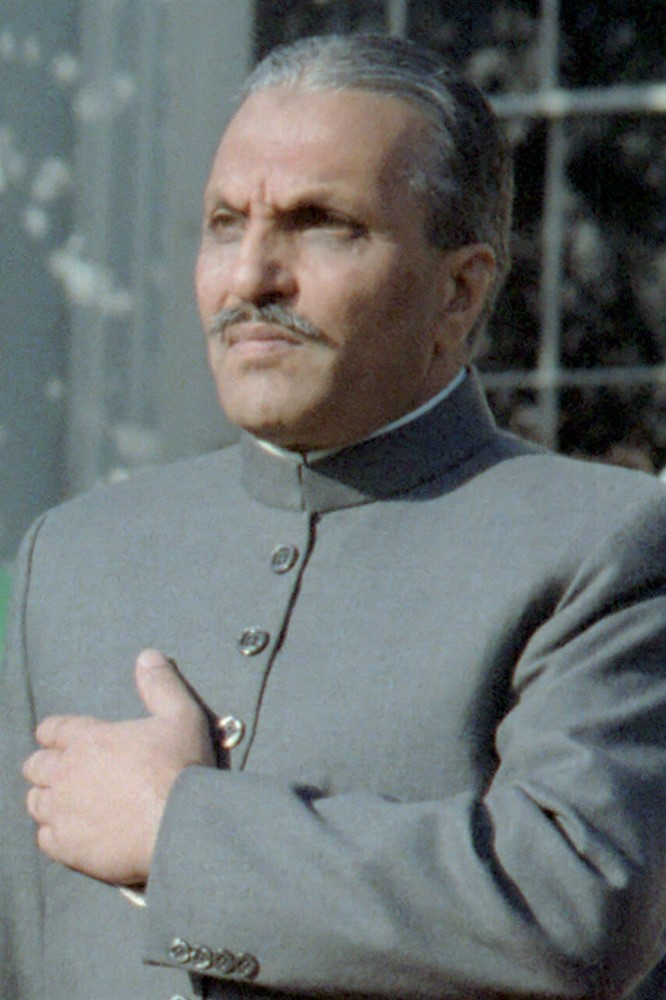
- Zia-ul-Haq during his presidency in 1982.
- Presidency of Zia-ul-Haq; 16 September 1978 – 17 August 1988
- Seat: Aiwan-e-Sadr
- Presidential Standard of Pakistan

Zia-ul-Haq assumed the position of sixth president of Pakistan on 16 September 1978 and his presidency ended with his death in an aircraft crash on 17 August 1988. Zia came to power after a coup, overthrowing prime minister Zulfikar Ali Bhutto and imposing martial law in 1977.

During his reign, there was significant political and military repression in Pakistan. Among the complaints against the Muhammad Zia ul-Haq administration were its repression of press and journalists, oppression of rape victims imprisoned for zina (extra-marital sex) under its Hudood Ordinances, and its repression of protestors. Zia's government repressed communists and protestors violently during the Movement for the Restoration of Democracy campaign.

Zia-ul-Haq came to power as a result of a coup, overthrowing Pakistan's first popularly elected Prime Minister, Zulfikar Ali Bhutto. Though the coup itself was bloodless, civilian opposition in parts of the country was substantial. Martial law was declared, senior civilian politicians opposing Zia were imprisoned, and less well known figures in opposition student groups, trade and journalist unions and political parties were "made an example of" with public floggings.

International geopolitics played a significant role in the state of human rights in Pakistan during this time. About two years after the coup, the Soviet Union invaded Pakistan's neighbor Afghanistan, transforming Pakistan and Zia's government into a key Cold War ally of the United States, and giving Zia latitude to ignore internationally accepted human rights norms.

== Cabinets ==
=== 1978: First presidential cabinet ===
In July 1978, first presidential cabinet was sworn-in under the presidency of Muhammad Zia-ul-Haq.

==== Federal ministers ====
Name	Portfolio	Period
A. K. Brohi	Law, Parliamentary Affairs, Religious Affairs, and Minorities Affairs	5 July 1978 to 23 August 1978
Faiz Ali Chishti	1. Establishment, Federal Inspection Commission; 2. Kashmir Affairs & Northern Areas	5 July 1978 to 23 August 1978
Fida Mohammad Khan	Housing and Works	5 July 1978 to 23 August 1978
Mustafa Gokal	Shipping and Ports and Export Promotion	5 July 1978 to 23 August 1978
Habibullah Khan Khattak	Industries and Production	5 July 1978 to 23 August 1978
Mahmoud Haroon	Interior	5 July 1978 to 23 August 1978
Ghulam Hassan Khan	Petroleum & Natural Resources	5 July 1978 to 23 August 1978
Ghulam Ishaq Khan	Finance, Planning, and Provincial Coordination	5 July 1978 to 23 August 1978
Jamal Said Mian	States and Frontier Regions	5 July 1978 to 23 August 1978
Gul Mohammad Khan Jogezai	Water and Power	5 July 1978 to 23 August 1978
Muhammad Junejo	Railways	5 July 1978 to 23 August 1978
Mohammad Ali Khan Hoti	Education, Culture, and Tourism	5 July 1978 to 23 August 1978
Mohyuddin Ahmedzai Baloch	Communications	5 July 1978 to 23 August 1978
Sharifuddin Pirzada	Attorney General for Pakistan	5 July 1978 to 23 August 1978
Khawaja Muhammad Safdar	Food and Agriculture, Cooperatives, and Livestock	5 July 1978 to 23 August 1978
Mian Zahid Sarfraz	Commerce	5 July 1978 to 23 August 1978
Chaudhry Zahoor Elahi	Labour, Manpower, and Local Government and Rural Development	5 July 1978 to 23 August 1978

==== Ministers of state ====
Name	Portfolio	Period
Hamid D. Habib	Export Promotion (Minister of State)	5 July 1978 to 23 August 1978
Javed Hashmi	Youth and Students Affairs (Minister of State)	5 July 1978 to 23 August 1978
Mahmud Ali	Health, Population and Social Welfare, and National Council of Social Welfare (Minister of State)	5 July 1978 to 23 August 1978
Agha Shahi	Foreign Affairs (Minister of State)	5 July 1978 to 23 August 1978
Viqar-un-Nisa Noon	Pakistan Tourism Development Corporation (Minister of State)	5 July 1978 to 23 August 1978

=== 1978–1979: Second presidential cabinet ===
In August 1978, second presidential cabinet was sworn-in under the presidency of Muhammad Zia-ul-Haq.

==== Federal ministers ====
Name	Portfolio	Period
Zia-ul-Haq	Cabinet Division, CMLA's Secretariat, Establishment Division, Federal Inspection Commission, Youth & Students Affairs, Foreign Affairs, Atomic Energy Commission, Industries, Petroleum & Natural Resources, Shipping, Ports & Export Promotion, Re-designated as Culture, Sports and Youth Affairs Division	23 August 1978 to 21 April 1979
Ali Ahmad Talpur	Defence	27 August 1978 to 21 April 1979
A. K. Brohi	Law & Parliamentary Affairs	27 August 1978 to 22 April 1979
Rehmat Elahi	Water & Power, Ministry of Petroleum and Natural Resources	27 August 1978 to 21 April 1979
Chaudhry Zahoor Elahi	Labour & Manpower, Re-designated as Ministry of Labour, Manpower & Overseas Pakistanis	27 August 1978 to 21 April 1979
Haji Faqir Mohammad Khan	States & Frontier Regions, Northern Areas and Kashmir Affairs	27 August 1978 to 21 April 1979
Fida Mohammad Khan	Housing & Works	27 August 1978 to 21 April 1979
Abdul Ghafoor Ahmed	Production Industries	27 August 1978 to 21 April 1979
Ghulam Ishaq Khan	Finance & Planning, Re-designated as Minister for Finance & Coordination	27 August 1978 to 21 April 1979
Iftikhar Ahmad Khan Ansari	Religious Affairs & Minorities Affairs	27 August 1978 to 21 April 1979
Khawaja Muhammad Safdar	Food, Agriculture and Cooperative	27 August 1978 to 21 April 1979
Mahmood Azam Farooqui	Information & Broadcasting	27 August 1978 to 21 April 1979
Mahmoud Haroon	Interior	27 August 1978 to 21 April 1979
Mian Zahid Sarfraz	Commerce	27 August 1978 to 21 April 1979
Subuh Sadiq Khan Khoso	Health & Production	27 August 1978 to 21 April 1979
Mohammad Arshad Chaudhri	Science & Technology	27 August 1978 to 21 April 1979
Ali Khan Hoti	Education, Culture and Tourism, Re-designated as Minister for Education	27 August 1978 to 2 May 1979
Mohyuddin Ahmedzai Baloch	Communications	27 August 1978 to 21 April 1979
Muhammad Junejo	Railways	27 August 1978 to 21 April 1979
Zaman Khan Achakzai	Local Government & Rural Development	27 August 1978 to 21 April 1979
Mustafa K. Gokal	Shipping, Ports & Export Promotion	27 August 1978 to 23 January 1979
Sharifuddin Pirzada	Attorney General for Pakistan	27 August 1978 to 31 May 1979
Khurshid Ahmad	-	30 August 1978 to 21 April 1979

==== Ministers of state ====
Name	Portfolio	Period
Hamid D. Habib	Statistics, Deputy Chairman, Planning Commission, Export Promotion Bureau	30 August 1978 to 21 April 1979
Javed Hashmi	Youth & Students Affairs, Re-designated as Minister of State for Culture, Sports and Youth Affairs	27 August 1978 to 21 April 1979
Mahmud Ali	National Council of Social Welfare	27 August 1978 to 21 April 1979

=== 1979–1981: Third presidential cabinet ===
In 1979, second presidential cabinet was sworn-in under the presidency of Muhammad Zia-ul-Haq.

==== Federal ministers ====
Name	Portfolio	Period
Muhammad Zia-ul-Haq	Cabinet Division, CMLA's Secretariat, Establishment Division, Federal Inspection Commission, Youth & Students Affairs, Foreign Affairs, Atomic Energy Commission, Industries, Petroleum and Natural Resources, Shipping, Ports & Export Promotion, Culture and Tourism, Health, Social Welfare and Population, Science and Technology, States and Frontier Regions, Railways, Local Government and Rural Development	21 April 1979 to 9 March 1981
Ali Ahmad Talpur	Defence	21 April 1979 to 9 March 1981
Faiz Ali Chishti	Labour and Manpower, Northern Areas and Kashmir Affairs, Petroleum and Natural Resources	21 April 1979 to 31 March 1980
Ghulam Hassan Khan	Production Industries	21 April 1979 to 9 March 1981
Ghulam Ishaq Khan	Finance and Economic Affairs, Planning and Development, Statistics, Commerce, Coordination	21 April 1979 to 9 March 1981
Inamul Haque Khan	Housing and Works, Water and Power	21 April 1979 to 9 March 1981
Jamal Said Mian	Railways, Local Government and Rural Development	21 April 1979 to 31 March 1980
Javed Hashmi	Culture and Tourism	21 April 1979 to 30 June 1979
Mahmoud Haroon	Interior, Religious Affairs & Minorities Affairs, Political Affairs	21 April 1979 to 9 March 1981
Ali Khan Hoti	Education, Culture, Sports and Tourism	2 May 1979 to 9 March 1981
Fazil Janjua	Food, Agriculture and Cooperatives	21 April 1979 to 9 March 1981
Mohyuddin Ahmedzai Baloch	Communications	21 May 1979 to 9 March 1981
Shahid Hamid	Information & Broadcasting, Culture, Sports and Tourism	21 April 1979 to 3 July 1980 (Information & Broadcasting); 3 July 1980 to 9 March 1981 (Culture, Sports and Tourism)
Sharifuddin Pirzada	Attorney General for Pakistan, Law & Parliamentary Affairs	31 May 1979 to 9 March 1981
Agha Shahi	Foreign Affairs	29 May 1980 to 9 March 1981

==== Ministers of state ====
Name	Portfolio	Period
Hamid D. Habib	Export Promotion Bureau (Minister of State)	21 April 1979 to 9 March 1981
Mahmud Ali	National Council of Social Welfare (Minister of State)	21 May 1979 to 9 March 1981

=== 1981–1985: fourth presidential cabinet ===
In 1981, a new cabinet took oath under the presidency of Muhammad Zia-ul-Haq.

==== Federal ministers ====
Name	Portfolio	Period
Zia-ul-Haq	Cabinet Division, Establishment Division, O & M Division, Women's Division, Commerce, Planning & Development Division, Population Division, Statistics Division, Railways, Religious Affairs & Minorities Affairs, Science and Technology, States & Frontier Regions Divisions, Defence, Health, Special Education & Social Welfare, Information & Broadcasting	9 March 1981 to 24 March 1985
Mohyuddin Ahmedzai Baloch	Communications	9 March 1981 to 26 February 1985
Arbab Niaz	Culture, Sports and Tourism	9 March 1981 to 26 February 1985
Ali Ahmad Talpur	Defence	9 March 1981 to 26 February 1985
Ali Khan Hoti	Education	9 March 1981 to 5 March 1983
Ghulam Ishaq Khan	Finance and Economic Affairs, Commerce, Planning & Development, Water & Power	9 March 1981 to 21 March 1985
Fazil Janjua	Food, Agriculture and Cooperatives, Labour, Manpower and Overseas Pakistanis, Housing & Works	9 March 1981 to 24 March 1985
Agha Shahi	Foreign Affairs	9 March 1981 to 9 March 1982
Nasir Ud Din Jogezai	Health & Social Welfare, Health, Special Education & Social Welfare (Redesigned on 23 December 1982)	9 March 1981 to 10 March 1984
Inamul Haque Khan	Housing & Works	9 March 1981 to 17 February 1983
Elahi Bux Soomro	Industries, Housing & Works	9 March 1981 to 26 February 1985
Raja Zafar-ul-Haq	Information & Broadcasting, Religious Affairs & Minorities Affairs	9 March 1981 to 26 February 1985
Mahmoud Haroon	Interior	9 March 1981 to 18 November 1984
Ghulam Dastgir Khan	Labour, Manpower and Overseas Pakistanis, Local Government and Rural Development	9 March 1981 to 26 February 1985
Sharifuddin Pirzada	Law and Parliamentary Affairs, Justice & Parliamentary Affairs (Redesignated on 17 January 1985)	9 March 1981 to 21 December 1984
Syed Fakhar Imam	Local Government and Rural Development	9 March 1981 to 8 December 1983
Rao Farman Ali	Petroleum and Natural Resources	9 March 1981 to 10 March 1984
Saeed Qadir	Production, National Logistic Board, Railways	9 March 1981 to 24 March 1985
Abbas Abbasi	Minister without Portfolio, Religious Affairs & Minorities Affairs	9 March 1981 to 18 March 1984
Jamal Dar	Kashmir Affairs and Northern Affairs	9 March 1981 to 25 December 1982
Raja Sikander Zaman	Water and Power, Kashmir Affairs & Northern Affairs	9 March 1981 to 26 February 1985
Sahabzada Yaqub Khan	Foreign Affairs	21 March 1982 to 24 March 1985
Muhammad Afzal	Education, Religious Affairs & Minorities Affairs	5 March 1983 to 24 March 1985
Jamal Said Mian	Kashmir Affairs & Northern Affairs, Local Government & Rural Development, Culture & Tourism	5 March 1983 to 24 March 1985
Abdul Ghafoor Hoti	Railways	5 March 1983 to 26 February 1985
Mahbub ul Haq	Planning & Development, Health, Special Education & Social Welfare, Industries	14 April 1983 to 24 March 1985
Zafarullah Khan Jamali	Local Government & Rural Development	17 April 1984 to 26 February 1985
F. S. Lodhi	Interior	22 January 1985 to 24 March 1985

==== Ministers of state ====
Name	Portfolio	Period
Zafarullah Khan Jamali	Food, Agriculture and Cooperatives	9 March 1981 to 17 April 1984
Mahmud Ali	Chairman, National Council of Social Welfare	9 March 1981 to 26 February 1985
Afifa Mamdot	Health, Special Education & Social Welfare, Women's Division	9 March 1981 to 23 April 1984
Muhammad Asad Khan	Petroleum & Natural Resources	25 August 1983 to 24 March 1985
Sartaj Aziz	Food, Agriculture & Cooperatives	17 April 1984 to 24 March 1985
Basahrat Jazbi	Health, Special Education & Social Welfare	14 June 1984 to 26 February 1985

== Domestic affairs ==
=== 1977 to 1979 ===
On July 5, 1977, the forces of Pakistan army swiftly moved to arrest the Prime Minister Zulfiqar Ali Bhutto, placing all the members of cabinet and leaders of Pakistan Peoples Party under house arrest. With entire party cadres under arrest, the regime faced little opposition until the death penalty for Bhutto was announced on 18 March 1978. His conviction was met with non-violent mass protests throughout Sindh and parts of Punjab. The protest in Nawabshah was crushed in first instance of mass murder by the regime where hundreds of protesting peasants were killed by use of combat helicopters on the orders of the provisional governor of Sindh Lieutenant-General S.M. Abbasi. This was followed by imposition of curfew in Nawabshah, Larkana, Sukkur, Hyderabad and parts of Karachi. The regime made thousands of arrests throughout Sindh and Punjab effectively banning display of the flag of Pakistan Peoples Party or its symbol. Cities throughout Sindh remained in continual state of curfew until April 4, 1979, when Bhutto was executed in secret, without a pre-announced date. The execution was followed by pre-emptive curfew throughout Sindh and reactionary curfews in Multan, Bhawalpur and other parts of Punjab. More than 50 people protested in Lahore, Rawalpindi, Peshawar, by self-immolation while thousands of participants and onlookers were arrested and jailed on grounds ranging from disruption of public order to sedition and high treason.

Public flogging of political prisoners was carried out by "bare-chested wrestlers" during the martial law era. Martial Law Regulation no.48 of October 1979 invoked a maximum penalty of 25 lashes for taking part in political activities. All political activities being banned at that time. When Islamic punishment were introduced, women were also flogged, a fact that the Pakistan Human Rights Society protested in August 1983. In Liaqatpur, Bahawalpur, a woman was lashed for Zina in front of a crowd of 5000.

=== Movement for Restoration of Democracy ===
In February, 1981 a coalition of eleven, primarily leftist, political parties led by Pakistan Peoples Party formed the Movement for Restoration of Democracy. The movement was strongest in Sindh, which was not favored by prosperity or by General Zia. According to author Ian Talbot "massive repression was required" to crush the MRD agitations in Larkana, Khairpur, Jacobabad and Nawabshah. The governor of Sindh was "forced to admit" that 1999 people had been arrested, 189 killed and 126 injured in the opening three weeks of the Movement's campaign. The movement claimed a death toll in thousands. In Nawabshah helicopters of Pakistan military used combat helicopters to shoot masses of protesting peasants. In Sukkur protestors were bulldozed on the instruction of army officer in charge when they refused orders to move and stop protesting. The human rights group Amnesty International reported that torture, imprisonment and violation of human rights increased steadily during 1981 and 6,000 political prisoners were arrested in March 1981.

On September 27, 1982, General Zia issued an executive decree, the Martial Law Regulation No. 53, allowing the death sentence as the prescribed punishment for "any offense liable to cause insecurity, fear or despondency amongst the public." Crimes punishable under this measure, which superseded civil law, included "any act with intent to impair the efficiency or impede the working" of, or cause damage to, public property or the smooth functioning of government. Another was abetting "in any manner whatsoever" the commission of such an offense. The regulation also prohibited the failure to inform the police or army of the "whereabouts or any other information about such a person." It also provided that "a military court on the basis of police or any other investigation alone may, unless the contrary is proved, presume that this accused has committed the offense charged." Thus reversing the principle of justice that citizens are innocent until proven guilty. The regulation was retroactive, as it "shall be deemed to have taken effect on July 5, 1977"—the day General Zia overthrew his predecessor Prime Minister Zulfiqar Ali Bhutto.

During the 11 year regime of General Zia, international human rights groups repeatedly expressed concern over army's ruthless measures to suppress dissent. Amnesty International, in a report released on 15 May 1978 expressed that, "We are very concerned at the use of flogging in Pakistan and are disturbed that this unusual punishment is also being inflicted on political prisoners for committing acts which often appear to be no more than exercise of the right of freedom of speech and expression guaranteed in the constitution. The first public hanging took place in March, after death sentences were passed by a military court on three civilians convicted for murder. At least 16 prisoners have so far been sentenced to floggings for political activities."

According to The Economist magazine: "Relatives, many of them teenagers, have in some cases been held temporarily as hostages until a wanted person was found. Bhutto's Attorney General, Yahya Bakhtiar was beaten up in his cell in Quetta jail this month: his family was given his bloodstained clothes for cleaning."

The Geneva-based International Commission of Jurists citing a report by the Lahore Bar Association, charged that "systematic torture" occurred in five Lahore prisons in 1984, particularly at a jail where many political detainees were held. Military courts are used increasingly to clear the backlog of cases in ordinary courts. The survey cited reports that the military courts decide cases in minutes and refuse defendants the rights to lawyers. Special military courts that try serious offenses allow defense counsel but "the judges often obstruct the lawyers in their work," the survey said.

On 19 November 1985, Amnesty International also accused the Zia regime of torturing and denying fair trials to political prisoners tried by special military courts. "As of September, more than 130 prisoners were serving sentences of between seven and 42 years after special military courts convicted them of political offenses or politically motivated criminal offenses. The military courts regularly use as evidence confessions extracted by torture while prisoners are hung upside down and beaten, given electric shocks, strapped to blocks of ice, deprived of food and sleep for two or three days and burned with cigarettes. Many prisoners are held in fetters and chains. People often are tried in courts held in closed session and denied the right of appeal to a higher court." The number of prisoners held without trial and shot on site was estimated to be ten-fold.

In 1986 a national convention ended with a resolution calling for a commission to monitor human rights violations.

International Commission of Jurists again published a report on 7 September 1987 stating that "some human rights abuses continue in Pakistan, including alleged military attacks on villagers, despite the lifting of martial law 20 months ago." The ICJ report cited reports by villagers who said their villages were raided and looted by soldiers sometimes accompanied by local police. "Some male villagers were shot to death and women beaten, in at least two cases pregnant women, who subsequently miscarried." When Zia died in 1988, the reputed Paris daily Le Monde wrote, "Certainly, no defender of democracy or human rights is going to shed tears over General Zia's death."

The Zia-ul-Haq military regime coincided with much of the Soviet–Afghan War (December 1979 to February 1989), which took place across its border and which Pakistan was a major participant helping the mujahideen insurgents against the Soviets. Despite the human rights situation in Pakistan being assessed as "very grim" during this era, the United States's Ronald Reagan administration—a major supporter of the Afghan mujahideen—continued to provide military and economic assistance to the Zia ul-Haq government.

=== Women's rights ===
The 1979 Hudood Ordinance decreed by General Zia ul-Haq replaced parts of the secular, British-era Pakistan Penal Code, adding new criminal offenses of adultery and fornication, and new punishments of whipping, amputation, and stoning to death. Pakistani women's rights activists and lawyers and international human rights organizations alleged that the ordinance made it exceptionally difficult and dangerous to prove an allegation of rape. Although Zia was killed in 1988, the effects of the law continued until 2006 when it was amended.

In 1979, before the ordinances went into effect there were 70 women held in Pakistani prisons, by 1988 there were 6000. A 2003 report by the National Commission on Status of Women (NCSW) estimated "80% of women" were incarcerated because "they had failed to prove rape charges and were consequently convicted of adultery." According to legal scholar Martin Lau

While it was easy to file a case against a woman accusing her of adultery, the Zina Ordinance made it very difficult for a woman to obtain bail pending trial. Worse, in actual practice, the vast majority of accused women were found guilty by the trial court only to be acquitted on appeal to the Federal Shariat Court. By then they had spent many years in jail, were ostracized by their families, and had become social outcasts.

Two other decrees or proposed decrees that caused a fervor among women activists were the Diyat Ordinance (which set the "blood money" compensation for a woman victim at half that for a male), and later the proposed Law of Evidence (which required two women to testify in place of one man). Human Rights Watch complained the laws relegated women to "inferior legal status" to men.

These were opposed by Women's groups (All Pakistan Women's Association and Women's Action Forum (which was formed by Najma Sadeque). These rules were challenged on an Islamic basis—the opponents offered an alternative interpretation of the ayah (verse) Quranic injunction ^{[Quran 2:282]} used as the basis of the law, emphasised that in other ayat (verses) men and women are assumed to be equal, and noted the importance of the importance of the testimony of two of Muhammad's wives, (Khadija and Aisha) in early Muslim history.

These pious rebuttal notwithstanding, the protesters were met with tear gas and lathi (baton) charges by police outside the High Court building.

== Freedom of religion ==
In 1982 Zia decreed new articles 298B and 298C of the Pakistani Penal Code. They prohibited the small Ahmadiyya religious minority from saying or implying they were Muslims, to "preach or propagate by words wither spoken or written" or to use Islamic terminology or Muslim practices of worship. Human rights advocates found these laws violated the principles of freedom to profess religion, freedom of speech and equality of citizens enshrined in both the Universal Declaration of Human Rights and the Constitution of Pakistan. Many of the policies of Zia-ul-Haq's government are seen as 'clearly anti-Shia'. Zia-ul-Haq's regime implemented policies that favored certain interpretations, which marginalized Shia rights and contributed to the rise of sectarian militant groups and leading to sectarian tensions and violence against Shia communities in Pakistan.

== Violation of women's rights ==
During the military regime of Zia-ul-Haq, a number of amendments were implemented which are perceived to have infringed upon women's rights. In some instances, women who reported cases of sexual assault were subject to punishment, such as lashes, as they lacked witnesses to corroborate their claims. It is worth noting that in Islam, the requirement of four witnesses is typically associated with cases of consensual sex (Zina bi'l Raza), to prevent false-accusers of Zina to someone and securing the 'dignity' of the accused person, however in the case of rape every clear evidence is sufficient for punishing the rapist. The legal framework introduced under Zia-ul-Haq's governance has often been viewed as diverging significantly from traditional Islamic Shari'ah laws. It is generally understood that the entire violation of women's rights started due to the effects of the military rule of Zia-ul-Haq, including victim-blaming of rape victims, even by the police many a time to the complainants, to avoid solving the case due to corruption.

== Freedom of the press ==
The repression of journalists started with the imposition of ban on the publication of the Daily Musawaat (Urdu: مساوات "Equity"). In response to the ban the Pakistan Federal Union of Journalists came out openly against the regime. After the failure of efforts to convince the Martial Law authorities to lift the ban, the PFUJ launched a campaign of hunger strike in Karachi from December 1, 1977. The strike was a surprising success, as journalists and press workers from all over the country participated, and within eight days the government lifted the ban. Unchastened the government rebounded from this setback by banning other periodicals: the daily Musawaat in Lahore, and weeklies including Al-Fatah and Meyar, all of which were critical of the Martial Law regime.

After negotiations failed, journalists and press workers launched another hunger strike in Lahore from April 30 to May 30, 1978. To break the strike, hunger strikers were arrested and sentenced under Martial Law Regulations for six months to one year rigorous imprisonment. Three—Khawar Naeem, Iqbal Jaferi Hashimi and Nasir Zaidi—were flogged, while a fourth, Masoodullah Khan, was spared on the intervention of the doctor. Full publicity in official media was given to a break-away, pro-government PFUJ (created by four PFUJ members and known as the "Rashid Siddiqui Group"), who condemning the strike.

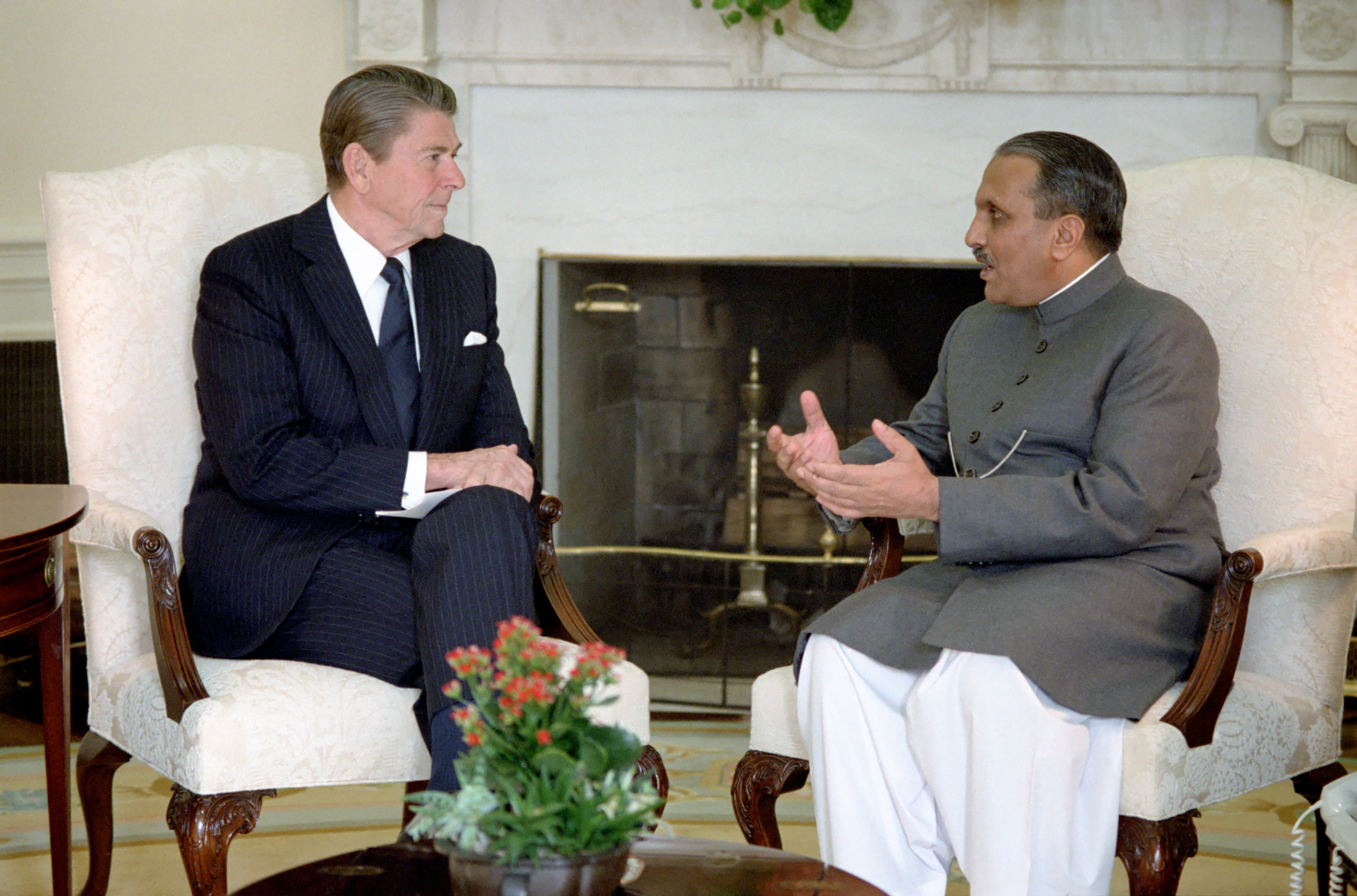
American President Ronald Reagan meeting with Pakistani President Zia-ul-Haq.

In October 1978, along with banning all political parties and meetings, rigid censorship was established. Editors of "defamatory" publications were subject to punishment of ten lashes and 25 years of imprisonment.

In January 1982, direct government censorship was ended and editors no longer had to submit stories to Government censors before publication. However, the Government continued to ban press/media coverage of political activity, "which, according to some reporters here, merely shifted the burden of responsibility to editors, making them more vulnerable and therefore more timid."

Ten senior journalists and office-bearers of the PFUJ belonging to the National Press Trust newspapers—Pakistan Times, Imroze, and Mashriq—were summarily removed from service because they signed an appeal for "Peace in Sindh" calling for an end to government repression during the 1983 MRD campaign.

== See also ==
- Spillover of Soviet - Afghan war in Pakistan
