= Nakus railway station =

Railway station in Balochistan, Pakistan

Nakus Railway Station ناکوس ریلوے اسٹیشن

General information
- Coordinates: 30.1416°N 67.8362°E
- Owner: Ministry of Railways
- Line: Kandahar State Railway

Other information
- Station code: NKS

Services
Preceding station	Pakistan Railways	Following station
Harnai towards Sibi Junction	Kandahar State Railway	Sharigh towards Zardalu
Location

Nakus Railway Station (Urdu: ناکوس ریلوے اسٹیشن, Balochi: ناکوس ریلوے اسٹیشن) is located in Balochistan, Pakistan.

== See also ==
- List of railway stations in Pakistan
- Pakistan Railways
