= Sibi-Zardalu Branch Line =

Sibi-Zardalu Branch-Line
- Native name: سبی-خوست برانچ لائن
- Industry: Railways
- Predecessor: Kandahar State Railway (1881-85)
- Founded: 1881; 145 years ago
- Area served: Balochistan
- Services: Rail transport
- Parent: North Western State Railway (1886-1905); North Western Railway (1905-1947); Pakistan Western Railway (1947-1971); Pakistan Railways (1971-Present)

The Sibi-Zardalu Branch Line, previously known as Kandahar State Railway opened in 1881, originally ran from Sibi and then on wards to Rindli, with the intention to reaching Quetta and onwards to Kandahar. However, the line never reached Kandahar. The Kandahar State Railway had its headquarters at Sibi, Balochistan. The Kandahar State Railway joined with the southern section of the Sind–Pishin State Railway and in 1886 amalgamated, with other railways, to form North Western State Railway (NWSR). The total length of this line is 140 kilometers with 10 railway stations. The railway line was closed in 2006 after a terrorist attack. Rehabilitation work started in 2016, and after several delays the railway line became partially-operational in 2023 up to Harnai.. Again this section has been closed by Pakistan Railways.

== History ==
From Sibi, the line ran southwest, skirting the hills to Rindli, and originally followed the course of the Bolan stream to its head on the plateau. The destructive action of floods, however, led to the abandonment of this alignment. The railway now follows the Mashkaf Valley. The Bolan Pass Railway construction enabled this NW route to be selected.

== Locals Problems ==
When the railway line was closed in 2006 due to terrorist attacks, locals have been facing travelling problems. As there is no direct road which connects Sibi to Harnai and further, locals have to go to Quetta first and then they go to their original destination. Using the railway makes a much simpler journey for local people.

== Stations ==
- Sibi Junction
- Nari
- Tanduri (Abandoned)
- Babar Kachh
- Kuchali Halt
- Dalujal (Abandoned)
- Spintangi
- Sunehri
- Harnai

Abandoned Section

- Nakus
- Sharigh
- Khost
- Zardalu

== Personnel ==
- Henry Francis Storey: 1880, Engineer-in-Chief of the Jacobabad section. 1881, appointed Engineer-in-Chief. 1883, promoted to the Superintendent of Way and Works.
- Hugh Lewin Monk: deployed from the Railway Branch of the Public Works Department to Kandahar State Railway until 1881.

== See also ==
- History of rail transport in Pakistan
- North Western State Railway
- Sind–Pishin State Railway
- Pakistan Railways
