= Sharigh railway station =

Railway station in Balochistan, Pakistan

Sharigh Railway Station شارغ ریلوے اسٹیشن

General information
- Owner: Ministry of Railways
- Line: Kandahar State Railway

Other information
- Station code: SGH

Services
Preceding station	Pakistan Railways	Following station
Nakus towards Sibi Junction	Kandahar State Railway	Khost towards Zardalu
Location

Sharigh Railway Station (Urdu: شارغ ریلوے اسٹیشن, Urdu: شارغ ریلوے اسٹیشن) is located in Balochistan, Pakistan.

== See also ==
- List of railway stations in Pakistan
- Pakistan Railways
