= Harnai Passenger =

Daily Pakistan Railways passenger train

Overview
- Service type: Inter-city rail
- First service: 7 August 2023
- Last service: 2024
- Current operator: Pakistan Railways

Route
- Termini: Sibi Junction; Harnai
- Stops: 5
- Distance travelled: 93 kilometres (58 mi)
- Average journey time: 5 hours
- Service frequency: Daily
- Train numbers: 223UP (Sibi Junction→Harnai); 224DN (Harnai→Sibi Junction)

On-board services
- Class: Economy
- Seating arrangements: yes
- Baggage facilities: yes

Technical
- Track gauge: 1,676 mm (5 ft 6 in)
- Track owner: Pakistan Railways

Harnai Passenger was a passenger train operated daily by Pakistan Railways between Sibi Junction and Harnai. The allotted numbers are 223UP/224DN. The trip took approximately five hours and forty-five minutes to cover a published distance of 93 kilometres (58 mi), travelling along a stretch of the Sibi-Zardalu Branch Line. On 7 August 2023 an inauguration ceremony was held. In the first phase the train ended at Spintangi railway station. On 29 October 2023, another inauguration ceremony was held and the train completed its journey till Harnai.

The train is discontinued from 2024.

== Route ==
- Sibi Junction–Harnai via Sibi-Khost Branch Line

== Station stops ==
- Sibi Junction
- Nari
- Babar Kachh
- Kuchali Halt
- Spintangi
- Sunehri
- Harnai

== History ==
The train service was closed in 2006 because track was badly damaged by terrorists. Harnai Railway Station (Urdu: ہرنائی ریلوے اسٹیشن, Balochi: ہرنائی ریلوے اسٹیشن) was re-built in 2017. In 2023 train service was restored making a direct line between Sibi and Harnai.

== Equipment ==
Harnai Passenger only offers economy class seating.
