= Indian locomotive class WL (1939) =

Indian WL (1939)
Type and origin
- Power type: Steam
- Builder: Vulcan Foundry
- Serial number: 4779–4782
- Build date: 1939
- Total produced: 4
Specifications
- Configuration
  - Whyte: 4-6-2
  - UIC: 2′C1′h2
- Gauge: 5 ft 6 in (1,676 mm)
- Driver dia.: 5 ft 7 in (1.702 m)
- Fuel type: Coal
- Cylinders: Two, outside
- Cylinder size: 18 1/2 in × 28 in (470 mm × 711 mm)
- Valve gear: Walschaerts
Career
- Operators: North Western Railway (British India); North Western Railway of Pakistan
- Number in class: 4
- Numbers: 101–104

The Indian locomotive class WL of 1939 was a class of 4-6-2 "Pacific"-type steam locomotives used on 5 ft 6 in (1,676 mm) broad-gauge lines in British India, and then in post-partition Pakistan.

== Classes ==
The four members of the class were built for the North Western Railway (of British India) by Vulcan Foundry in Newton-le-Willows, Lancashire, England, in 1939, and were delivered the following year. Upon the partition of India in 1947, they all went to Pakistan.

The class WL of 1939 is not to be confused with the Indian locomotive class WL of 1955, the first ten members of which were also built by Vulcan Foundry. According to Vulcan Foundry's publicity material, the two classes bore no resemblance to each other.

== Class table ==
Table of orders and numbers
Year	Manufacturer	Serial nos.	Qty	First nos.	All-India nos.	Notes
1939	Vulcan	4779–4782	4	101–104		All 4 transferred to Pakistan

== See also ==
- Rail transport in India#History
- History of rail transport in Pakistan
- Locomotives of India
- Pakistan Railways
