= Khost railway station =

Railway station in Balochistan, Pakistan

Coordinates: 30.222959°N 67.578119°E

Khost Railway Station خوست ریلوے اسٹیشن

General information
- Owner: Ministry of Railways
- Line: Kandahar State Railway

Other information
- Station code: KOS

Services
| Preceding station | Pakistan Railways | Following station |
|---|---|---|
| Sharigh towards Sibi Junction | Kandahar State Railway | Zardalu Terminus |
Location

Khost Railway Station (Urdu: خوست ریلوے اسٹیشن, Balochi: خوست ریلوے اسٹیشن) is a railway station located in Balochistan, Pakistan. Khost railway station has been inoperative since 2007.

== See also ==
- List of railway stations in Pakistan
- Pakistan Railways
