= Jhandi railway station =

Railway station in Pakistan

Jhandi Station جھنڈی ریلوے اسٹیشن

General information
- Owner: Ministry of Railways
Location

Jhandi railway station (Urdu: جھنڈی ریلوے اسٹیشن) is an abandoned city station on a narrow gauge track in Kohat. It was operational till late 1980s.

== History ==
The station was built by North Western Railways in 1890s.

== Services ==
The station once provided a train stoppage between Kohat Cantonment railway station and Thall town. It was an important public place of Kohat city in yesteryear.

== Station building and platform ==
After being abandoned by Pakistan Railways due to security reasons in 1991, the only remnants of the old Jhandi (flag) railway station are the collapsing structure of the ticket office, a passenger shed now turned into a cattle shed, and the railway lines made by Barrow Hematite Steel Company of England in 1896 for North Western Railways. The railway carriages and engines have disappeared from the record books. The ruined ticket office still has instructions for passengers in English and Urdu.

== Kidnapping of a stationmaster ==
In 1951–52, a stationmaster posted at Jhandi railway station, was reportedly kidnapped by some tribesmen from Tirah valley. Though the poor railway official was lucky enough to get escaped from a distant tribal territory after a month later.

== See also ==
- Khushalgarh–Kohat–Thal Railway
- Thal And Out Agency railway station
