= Punjab Northern State Railway =

- Industry: Railways
- Founded: 1876
- Defunct: 1885
- Successor: North Western State Railway (NWR)
- Headquarters: Lahore, British Raj
- Area served: Punjab, Northwest Frontier Province
- Services: Rail transport

The Punjab Northern State Railway (reporting mark PNSR), opened in 1876, was a railway line between Lahore and Peshawar.

== History ==
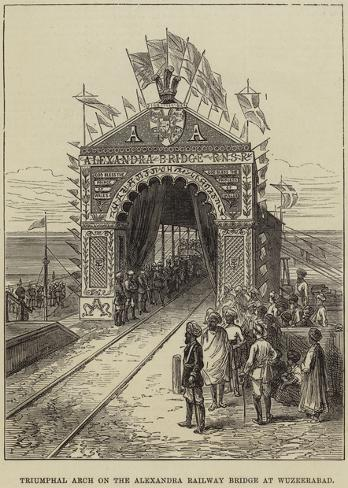
Triumphal Arch on the Alexandra Railway Bridge at Wuzeerabad in 1876

The route of what became the Punjab Northern State Railway, was first surveyed in 1857. Years of political and military debate followed as described under the "Lahore & Peshawar Railway". The Punjab Northern State Railway was created in 1870–71 to construct and operate the railway between Lahore and Peshawar. The first section of the line was opened in 1876 from Lahore to Peshawar and in 1883 the Attock Bridge over the Indus River was completed. Francis Joseph Edward Spring was deployed from the Imperial Civil Service's engineering section in 1873 as consulting engineer for the survey of the PNSR and the construction of various parts of that railway and bridges. He remained attached to the PNSR until 1878. Several major bridges required construction to complete the PNSR line between from Lahore and Peshawar:

- Jhelum Bridge, over the Jhelum River at Jhelum. Construction began in 1871 by William St. John Galwey and opened in 1873.
- Alexandra Bridge, over the Chenab River between Wazirabad and Gujrat. Construction began in 1871 by Francis Joseph Edward Spring and opened in 1876 by King Edward VII.
- Ravi Bridge, over the Ravi River situated between Sadiqpura, Lahore and Shahdara Bagh. Construction began in 1871 by Francis Joseph Edward Spring and completed in 1876.
- Attock Bridge, over in Indus River. Construction began in 1880 by Francis Langford O'Callaghan and completed 1883.

Along with several other railways, the Punjab Northern State Railway was merged with the Scinde, Punjab & Delhi Railway in 1886 to form the North Western State Railway.

== Personnel ==
The following from the railway branch of the public works department were deployed to the PNSR:

- Henry Francis Storey: (1868–78), employed on the construction of the Alexandra bridge over the Chenab river
- Henry Thomas Geoghegan: (1868), executive engineer
- Robert Trefusis Mallet: (1868), executive engineer
- Hugh Lewin Monk: (1870–73), assistant engineer
- Horace Bell: (1874), executive engineer during construction
- Joseph Bonus: (1877–81), superintending engineer and engineer-in-chief for the construction from Rawalpindi-Peshawar section
- James Condor: (1875), executive engineer
- Thomas Gracey Col. R.E.: (1879), engineer-in-chief of the Rawalpindi-Kohat section
- Frederick Lewis Dibblee: (1879–80), PNSR engineer-in-chief (Jhelum division) and later superintending engineer of Rawalpindi section
- Ernest Lindsay Marryat: (1880–86), PNSR manager.
- Richard Arthur Sargeaunt: (1884–87), PNSR office manager.

== See also ==
- History of rail transport in Pakistan
- Indus Valley State Railway
- North Western State Railway
- Pakistan Railways
