= Nari railway station =

Railway station in Balochistan, Pakistan

Coordinates: 29.654023°N 67.889097°E

Nari Railway Station ناری ریلوے اسٹیشن

General information
- Owner: Ministry of Railways
- Line: Kandahar State Railway

Other information
- Station code: NAR

Services
Preceding station	Pakistan Railways	Following station
Sibi Junction Terminus	Kandahar State Railway	Babar Kachh towards Zardalu
Location

Nari Railway Station (Urdu: ناری ریلوے اسٹیشن, Balochi: ناری ریلوے اسٹیشن) is located in Balochistan, Pakistan.

== See also ==
- List of railway stations in Pakistan
- Pakistan Railways
