= Ahmedzai (surname) =

Ahmedzai is a surname of Persian origin. Notable people with the surname include:

- Mohammad Sarwar Ahmedzai (born 1972), Afghan politician
- Prince Ahmed Ali Ahmedzai (born 1968), Pakistani politician
- Prince Ahmed Umer Ahmedzai, Pakistani politician in Balochistan
- Sam Ahmedzai (born 1950), British palliative care specialist
- Mohyuddin Ahmedzai Baloch (1942–2021), Pakistani politician
