= Sind–Pishin State Railway =

Former state railway

- Industry: Railways
- Founded: 1879
- Defunct: 1885
- Successor: North Western State Railway (NWR)
- Headquarters: Kotri, British Raj
- Area served: Balochistan, Sindh
- Services: Rail transport

The Sind–Pishin State Railway (reporting mark SPR) was the name of a broad gauge line that ran between Rohri, Sindh and Chaman, Balochistan. In 1886, the southern section of the Sind–Pishin State Railway was amalgamated with the Kandahar State Railway and several other railways to form the North Western State Railway (NWR). Today the line is still active and part of the Rohri–Chaman Railway Line.

== History ==
- 6 October 1879: First rail laid of the 20 mile section from Ruk to Sibi, at the entrance of the Nari Pass and this section was opened on 14 January 1880. The track of 133 miles had been laid in 101 days across the waterless desert by 5000 men and their animals.
- 1880: orders issued for the line to be extended Pishin and to be through the Harnai Pass rather than the Bolan Pass. It was considered that the Harnai was suited to the broad gauge while the Bolan was only possible for a narrow gauge.
- April 1881: Afghanistan was evacuated and seeing no further need for the railway, construction of the line was dropped.
- 1883: Construction begins again, but in secret and known in public as the "Harnai Road Improvement Scheme". This subterfuge was abandoned in February 1884 and the line was then known as the Sind–Pishin State Railway. Colonel (later Sir) James Browne was in charge of the work. Commencing from Sibi, at Nari, 500 feet above sea level and 459 miles from Karachi, it entered the Nari Gorge through a tunnel and then followed the river by crossing it by six bridges built in Portland Cement Concrete. Then it traversed the Kuchali defile. From Babar Kachh to Harnai it traversed six further bridges, before rising 425 feet in 7 miles between Babar Kachh to Kuchali and then 560 feet in 13 miles between Dalujal and Spintangi. Harnai was 2950 feet; Nakus 3362 feet; Sharigh was reached at 3963 feet then it dropped down to Khost before going up to Dirgi at 4756 feet. From Dirgi the line rose at 1 in 44 crossing the Chapper Rift to Mangi, traversing a steady 1 in 45 and a series of tunnels and bridges including the Louise Margaret Bridge, which was 225 above the river bed. Four miles on from Mangi was the Mudgorge region which extended five miles to Kuchali, a wilderness of boulders and clay. Through Mudgorge, the line was arched because of the land slips and in 1892 and 1893 the slips took away parts of the line and hence the building of the Mushkaf-Bolan Railway section as part of the North Western Railway network. From Kachh the line descended rapidly and crossed itself near the 566 mile mark, passed through Fuller's Camp and Khanai at 5,487 feet, and reached Bostan at 5,154 feet. There is joined the Bolan Railway from Quetta and turned north toward the Khojak and Chaman. The section from Bostan to Chaman, some 62 miles, opened in January 1888 and fully through to Chaman in January 1892. The main work here was the Khojak Tunnel and was the longest railway tunnel.

== Personnel ==
- James Arthur Anderson, from the Public Works Department(PWD) was the Executive Engineer at the time of construction.
- Ernest Ifill Shadbolt, from the Railway Branch of the PWD, 1887–91, to the Sind–Pishin State Railway as Executive Engineer.
- George Pringle Rose, from the Railway Branch of the PWD, deployed to the Sind–Pishin State Railway as Executive Engineer in 1890.
- Vans Righy, from the Railway Branch of the PWD, deployed to the Sind–Pishin State Railway as Executive Engineer, was in 1890 on furlough.

== See also ==
- History of rail transport in Pakistan
- Scinde Railway
- Kandahar State Railway
- Pakistan Railways
