= Tanduri railway station =

Railway station in Pakistan

Coordinates: 29.7233°N 67.9432°E

General information
- Owner: Ministry of Railways

Other information
- Station code: TDI

History
- Former names: Great Indian Peninsula Railway
Location

Tanduri railway station (Urdu: تندوری ریلوے اسٹیشن) is located in Pakistan.

== See also ==
- List of railway stations in Pakistan
- Pakistan Railways
