= Indus Valley State Railway =

Former railway station in British India

- Industry: Railways
- Founded: 1870
- Defunct: 1885
- Successor: North Western State Railway (NWR)
- Headquarters: Kotri, British Raj
- Area served: Sindh, Punjab
- Services: Rail transport

The Indus Valley State Railway (reporting mark IVSR) was a railway founded in 1871 to provide a rail link between Kotri and Multan and to replace the Indus Steam Flotilla. The opening of the line thus connected Karachi with Lahore.

== History ==
The survey of the Indus Valley railway line began in 1869 and was undertaken by John Brunton, the Chief Resident Engineer of Scinde Railway, and assisted by his son William Arthur Brunton. The Empress Bridge, opened in 1878, carried the IVSR over the Sutlej River near Bahawalpur. The Indus and Sutlej rivers were seen as major impediments in the expansion of the railways. The IVSR had reached Rohri in 1879 and a steam ferry would transport eight wagons at a time across the Indus River between from Rohri to Sukkur. This was found to be cumbersome and time-consuming. The opening of Lansdowne Bridge in 1889 solved this bottleneck, as rail traffic could now travel from Karachi uninterrupted to Lahore. The Indus Valley State Railway was merged in 1886 to form the North Western State Railway. Today, this line forms a section of the Karachi–Peshawar Line.

== Personnel ==
- Frederick Ewart Robertson, 1869–70, deployed from Public Works Department State Railways Department; 1869–89. 1869, employed on the IVSR survey; 1870, Engineer-in-Charge of the construction division in Upper Sind until the IVSR was opened for traffic in 1877; 1879, In-charge of a sub-division of the IVSR. He established the railway ferry over the Indus at Sukkur. The ferry was successfully worked until it was replaced by the Lansdowne Bridge; 1887, Lansdowne Bridge, of the cantilever type, with an 820 feet(248M) span, involved his design of novel and suitable plant for its erection. The whole of the work was successfully carried out by him, and the bridge was opened in 1889; 1889, appointed Engineer-in-Chief of the IVSR, which included the Khojak Junction under construction; 1889, resigned.
- Hugh Lewin Monk, 1869–79. 1869 as an Assistant Engineer. Then 1874–79 as Executive Engineer assisting in the construction of the Empress Bridge
- Joseph Bonus, 1870–77, Executive Engineer, Engineer-in-Chief and then Superintending Engineer IVSR.
- James Arthur Anderson, c.1871-c.1890 dates unspecified. Executive Engineer deployed from PWD to IVSR
- William St. John Galwey c.1872-78, Engineer-in-Chief for the construction of the Empress Bridge, opened in 1878, deployed from the Public Works Department (PWD) Railway Branch.
- C. Campbell, 1872, Engineer-in-Chief, Multan Division.
- J. Collet, 1872, Superintending Engineer, Multan Division.
- R. Heenan, 1872, Executive Engineer, Multan Division.
- W. Scott, 1872, Executive Engineer, Multan Division (Soojabad).
- F. M. Avern, 1872, Executive Engineer, Multan Division (Satlaj Bridge).
- H. C. Graham, 1872, Executive Engineer, Multan Division (Bhawalpur).
- W. Nethersole, 1872, Superintending Engineer, Rohree (Sakkhar) Division.
- T. T. Ryan, 1872, Executive Engineer (Khanpur), Rohree (Sakkhar) Division.
- C. E. Pridden Lieut., 1872, Executive Engineer, Rohree (Sakkhar) Division (Upper Scind).
- Archibald Cuthbert Bigg-Wither 1872-96?, deployed from Railway Branch - PWD to IVSR, dates unspecified ‘Served chiefly on the Indus Valley State Railway'.
- William St. John Galwey, 1873 Engineer-in-charge of the Empress Bridge construction over the River Sutlej.
- Frederick Lewis Dibblee, 1874-78 Superintending Engineer.
- Frederick Nicholas Gutersloh, 1874-78, deployed from PWD - Railway Branch - PWD as Assistant Engineer.
- George Winmill, 1875-88 deployed from Public Works Department (PWD) on joining as 2nd sub-Engineer.
- Middleton Rayne, 1876-79, Engineer-in-chief. See British Library IOR IOR Mss Eur D904; "Middleton Rayne papers" with the catalogue contents 'Papers of Middleton Rayne (1830–82), Public Works Dept, Government of India 1868–79, Engineer in Chief, Indus Valley State Railway 1876–79, comprising diaries, sketchbooks, letters and photographs; also two diaries, dated 1871 and 1883, of his wife Annie.
- James Condor, 1878–81, Traffic Superintendent IVSR.
- Henry Thomas Geoghegan, 1877–79, Superintending Engineer IVSR.
- Henry Francis Storey, 1879–86. 1879 as Engineer, 1881 as Engineer-in-Chief and promoted to Superintendent of Way and Works until transferred in 1886
- Robert Trefusis Mallet, 1879–80, Engineer-in-Chief IVSR; and 1885-86 Engineer-in-Chief of IVSR Empress Bridge, 1885–86.
- William Michell, 1883–87, Executive Engineer IVSR where he held charge from time to time of the Jacobabad, Kandahar and Northern divisions.
- James Ramsay 1880-? Engineer-in-Chief IVSR.

== See also ==
- History of rail transport in Pakistan
- Pakistan Railways
- Punjab Railway
- Scinde, Punjab & Delhi Railway
