= Indian locomotive class WL (1955) =

Indian WL (1955)
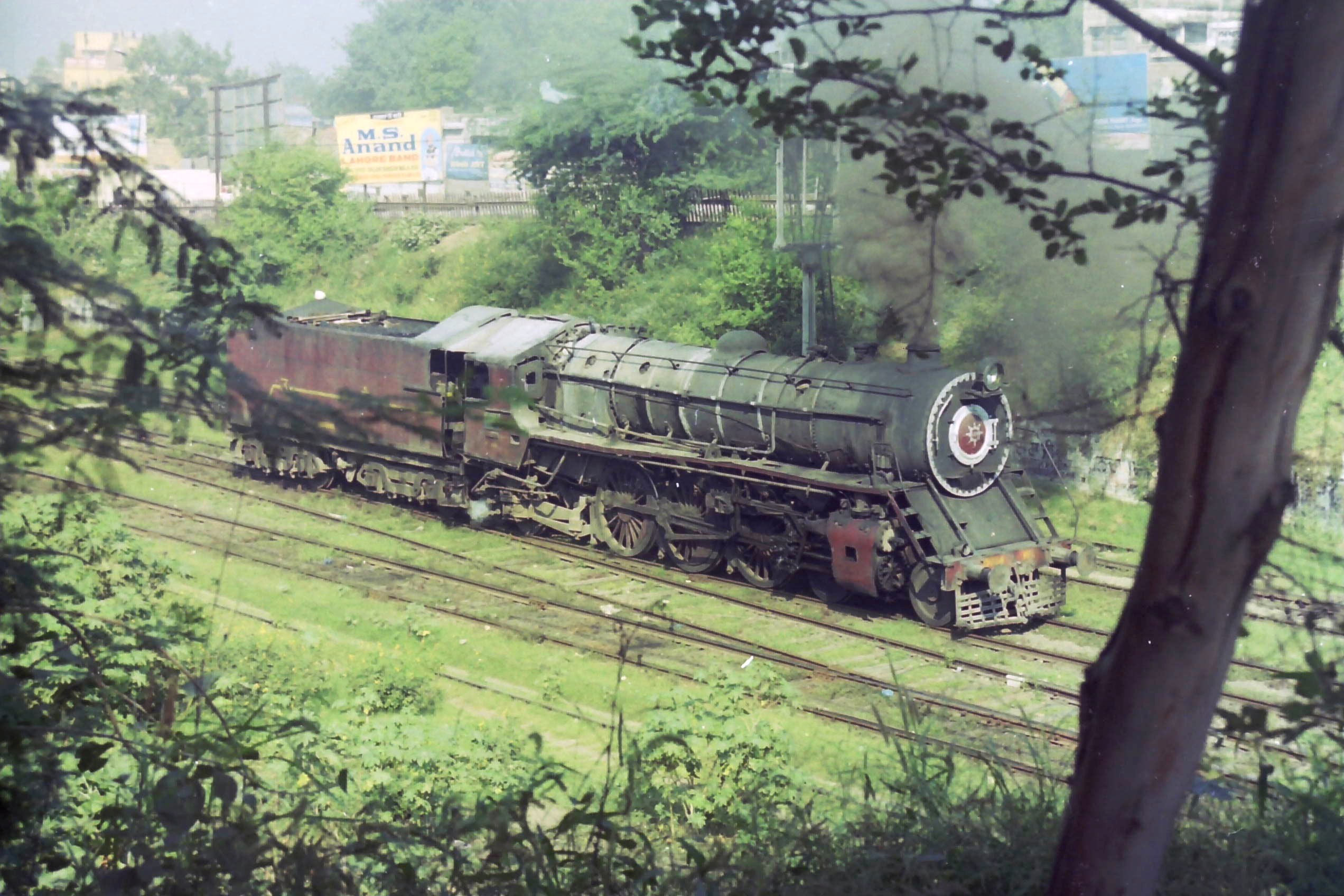
- WL 15084 at Amritsar Jn, 1993.
Type and origin
- Power type: Steam
- Builder: Vulcan Foundry (10); Chittaranjan Locomotive Works (94)
- Build date: 1955, 1966–1969
- Total produced: 104
Specifications
- Configuration
  - Whyte: 4-6-2
  - UIC: 2′C1′ h2
- Gauge: 5 ft 6 in (1,676 mm)
- Driver dia.: 5 ft 7 in (1.702 m)
- Axle load: 16.9 long tons (17.2 t; 18.9 short tons)
- Loco weight: 88.1 long tons (89.5 t; 98.7 short tons)
- Tender weight: 62.59 long tons (63.59 t; 70.10 short tons)
- Fuel type: Coal
- Fuel capacity: 12 long tons (12 t; 13 short tons)
- Water cap.: 4,500 imp gal (20,000 L; 5,400 US gal)
- Boiler pressure: 210 psi (1.45 MPa)
- Cylinders: Two, outside
- Cylinder size: 19 1/4 in × 28 in (489 mm × 711 mm)
- Valve gear: Walschaerts
Performance figures
- Tractive effort: 27,640 lbf (122.95 kN)
Career
- Operators: Indian Railways
- Number in class: 104
- Numbers: 15000–15009; 15014–15107
- First run: 1955
- Last run: 6 December 1995
- Preserved: #15005 is the only one to be preserved.
- Current owner: Rewari Steam Heritage Shed
- Disposition: One preserved, remainder scrapped

The Indian locomotive class WL of 1955 was a class of light axle load 4-6-2 "Pacific" type steam locomotives used on 5 ft 6 in (1,676 mm) broad gauge lines in India between 1955 and 1995. A total of 109 of them were built in two batches.

The first batch, of 10 engines, was built by Vulcan Foundry in Newton-le-Willows, Lancashire, England, in 1955. The second, main, batch, totalling 94 engines, was built in India by the Chittaranjan Locomotive Works between 1966 and 1969.

The WL class of 1955 is not to be confused with the WL class of 1939, all of which went to Pakistan upon partition in 1947. The two classes bore no resemblance to each other according to Vulcan.

WL #15005 "Sher-e-Punjab" is the one used on the last run of broad gauge steam locomotive on the Indian Railways. This historic run was between Ferozepur and Jalandhar on the Northern Railway on 6 December 1995.

== Class table ==
Table of orders and numbers
Year	Manufacturer	Serial Nos.	Qty	First Nos.	All-India Nos.	Notes
1955	Vulcan	6188-6197	10	7785-7794	15000–15009	
1966-1968	Chittaranjan		94		15014–15107	

== Preservation ==
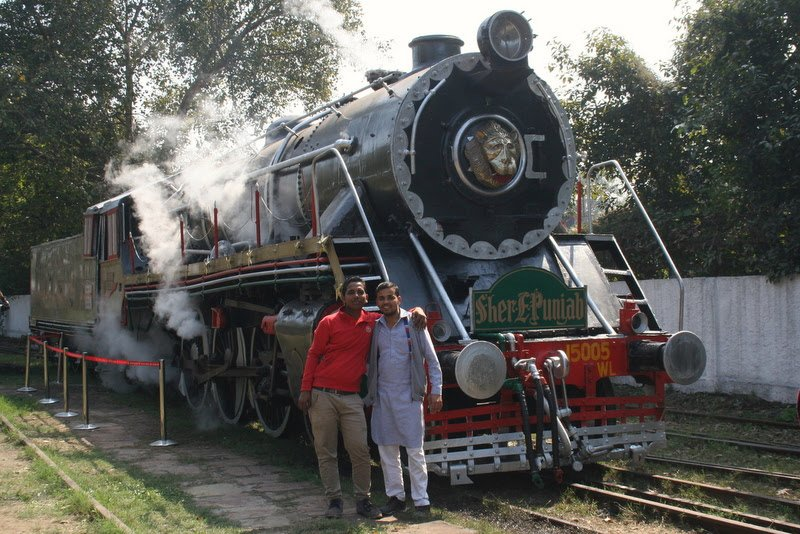
WL 15005 renamed as Sher e Punjab was brought from Rewari loco shed to NRM delhi for display in 2013

Working	Class	Number	Location	Built	Zone	Builders	Build No	Name
Yes	WL	15005	Rewari Steam Shed	1955	NW	Vulcan Foundry	6193	Sher e Punjab

== See also ==
- Rail transport in India#History
- Indian Railways
- Locomotives of India
- Rail transport in India
