= Ali Khan Hoti =

Pakistani politician (1922 - 2012)

Muhammad Ali Khan Hoti
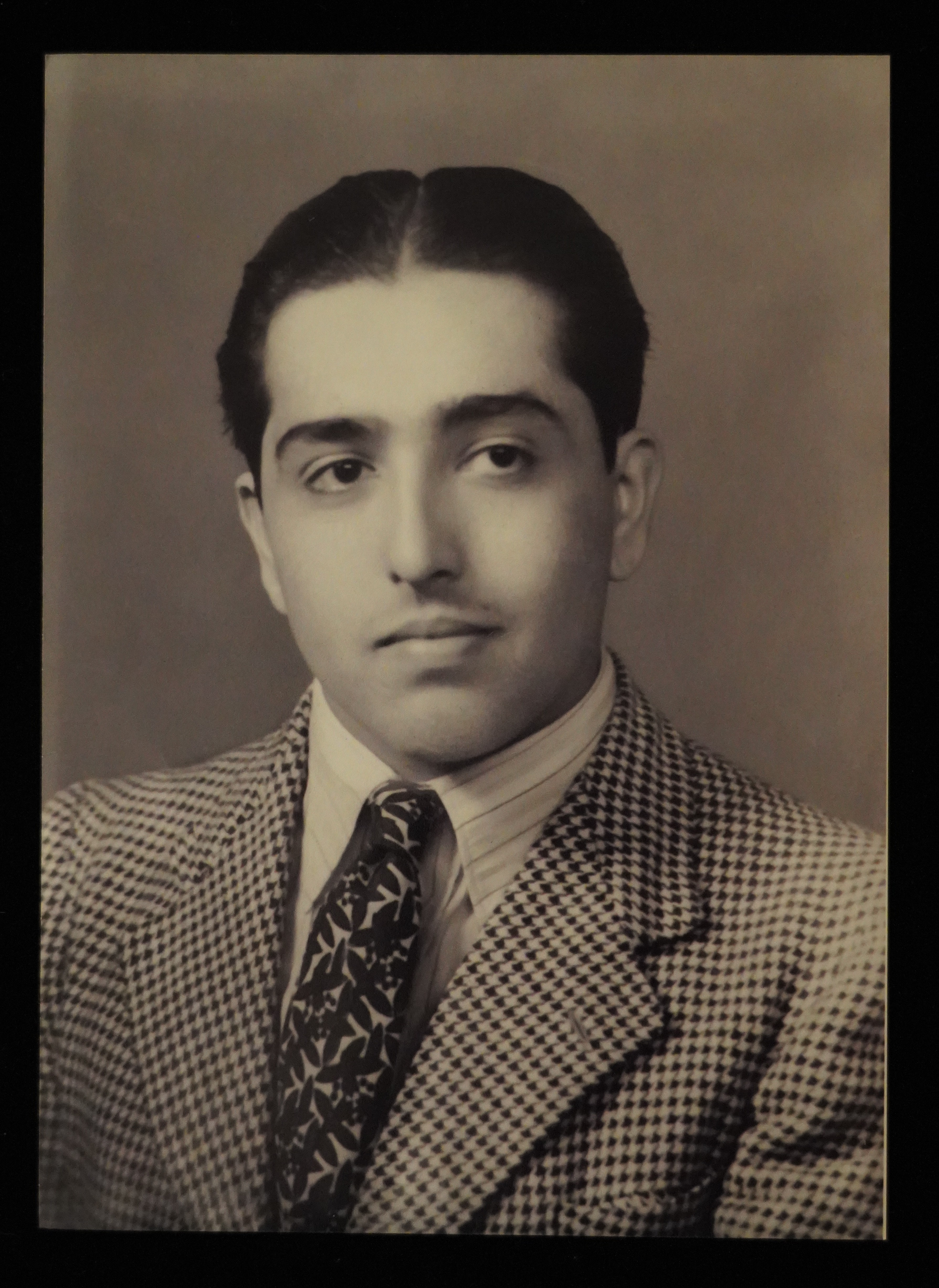
- Born: 15 October 1922; Hoti, Mardan, Khyber Pakhtunkhwa, Pakistan
- Died: 18 October 2012 (aged 90); Islamabad, Pakistan
- Resting place: Hoti, Mardan, Khyber Pakhtunkhwa, Pakistan
- Education: The Doon School, Dehra Dun; Government College, Lahore
- Children: 7
- Father: Sardar Muhammad Aslam Khan

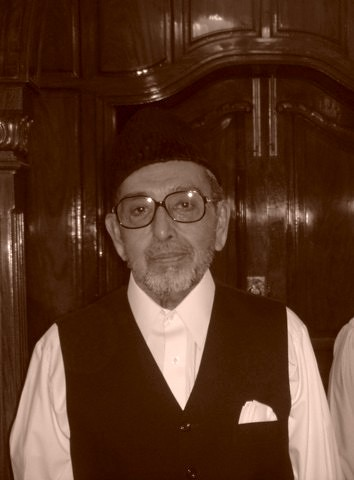

Nawabzada Muhammad Ali Khan Hoti (Urdu: محمد علی خان ہوتی) (15 October 1922 – 18 October 2012) was a Pakistani politician who served as Leader of the House in the Senate and as a Federal Minister. He was also a prominent landlord, hailing from the village of Hoti in Mardan, Khyber Pakhtunkhwa, Pakistan.

== Early life ==
Muhammad Ali Khan Hoti completed his Senior Cambridge from The Doon School in Dehra Dun, India. He pursued his intermediate education under the Allahabad Board in Uttar Pradesh, India, and graduated with distinction in Political Science and History in 1943 from Government College, Lahore. He received his religious education from Maulana Abdul Latif Khan Sahib. During his student life, he was an active member of the Muslim Students' Federation and later joined the All-India Muslim League in 1944, after the release of his estate from the Court of Wards.

== Career ==
Muhammad Ali Khan Hoti entered politics before the creation of Pakistan and maintained close ties with the Muslim League throughout his political career. When he became Secretary General of the Frontier Muslim League, he was the youngest office bearer in the All-India Muslim League at that time, as well as the youngest member of its Central Council. As a young Muslim Leaguer, he took an active part in the Pakistan Movement, particularly in the North-West Frontier Province (now Khyber Pakhtunkhwa). His role in spreading awareness among the people of Mardan about the objectives and ideology of the Muslim League and the creation of Pakistan was noteworthy. Nawab Liaquat Ali Khan, recognizing his tireless efforts for the All-India Muslim League, visited Muhammad Ali Khan's residence during his tour of the NWFP and addressed two public meetings under his presidentship — one at Takht Bhai and another at Mardan Public Park.

Muhammad Ali Khan was appointed General Secretary of the Provincial Muslim League of NWFP in March 1945. In this capacity, he visited numerous villages across Bannu, Kohat, Hazara, Mardan, and Peshawar, spreading the message of the Muslim League and uniting people under its flag for the freedom movement.

Muhammad Ali Khan represented Pakistan in the United Nations' Conference on Trade and Employment held at Havana, Cuba in 1947-48. He was elected as a member of the West Pakistan Assembly in 1965, and served in two Provincial Cabinets — first as Minister of Health, and later as Minister of Education. In 1978, he was appointed Federal Minister of Education during the regime of General Zia-ul-Haq, a position he held for five years (5 July 1978 – 5 March 1983). He was elected to the Senate twice — first on 14 March 1985, and again on 12 December 1988. Later, in 2010, he was elected as Senior Vice President and member of the Working Committee of the Pakistan Muslim League (N).

Muhammad Ali Khan was also the Rector of the International Islamic University, Islamabad from August 1982 to February 1983.

== Death ==
Muhammad Ali Khan Hoti died in Islamabad after protracted illness, leaving behind his wife, two sons, and five daughters. He was buried in his ancestral graveyard in Hoti, Mardan.
