= Sunehri Halt railway station =

Railway station in Pakistan

General information
- Owner: Ministry of Railways

Other information
- Station code: SNRI

History
- Former names: Great Indian Peninsula Railway

Sunehri Halt railway station (Urdu: سنہری ہالٹ ریلوے اسٹیشن) is located in Pakistan.

== See also ==
- List of railway stations in Pakistan
- Pakistan Railways
