= Mahmood Azam Farooqui =

Pakistani politician

Member of the National Assembly of Pakistan
- In office 1970–1977
- Constituency: NW-131 (Karachi-IV)

Minister of Education and Broadcasting
- In office 23 August 1978 – 21 April 1979
- President: Muhammad Zia-ul-Haq

Personal details
- Party: Jamaat-e-Islami
- Occupation: Politician

Mahmood Azam Farooqui was a Pakistani politician who served as the federal minister for education and broadcasting in the second presidential cabinet of Muhammad Zia-ul-Haq from August 1978 to April 1979. He was earlier elected to the National Assembly from Karachi as a candidate of Jamaat-e-Islami in the 1970 Pakistani general election.

== Political career ==
In the 1970 Pakistani general election, Farooqi was elected from Constituency NW-131 (Karachi-IV) as a Jamaat-e-Islami candidate. He received 48,785 votes and narrowly defeated Maulana Muhammad Shafi Okarvi, who received 48,737 votes.

During the early years of the post-1971 parliament, Farooqi was active in National Assembly proceedings. He moved an adjournment motion on the proposed trial of Yahya Khan.

On 23 August 1978, Farooqi was inducted into Zia-ul-Haq's second presidential cabinet. He served as a Federal Minister of Information and Broadcasting.
