= Pakistan Western Railway =

State owned enterprise

- Native name: پاکستان مغربی ریلویز
- Company type: State-owned enterprise
- Industry: Rail Transport; Logistics; Shipping
- Predecessor: North Western State Railway
- Founded: 14 August 1947 (78 years ago)
- Defunct: 1974
- Successor: Pakistan Railways
- Headquarters: Lahore, West Pakistan
- Area served: West Pakistan (with limited service to Iran)
- Owner: Government of Pakistan
- Parent: Ministry of Railways

The Pakistan Western Railway (Urdu: پاکستان مغربی ریلویز) was one of two divisions of Pakistan Railways which operated between 1947 and 1971. The company was headquartered in Lahore. In 1971, Pakistan Western Railway renamed itself to Pakistan Railways.

Originally named the North-Western Railway, it was officially renamed as the Pakistan Western Railway in 1961, few decades after the independence of Pakistan. In East Bengal the same year, the portion of the Assam Bengal Railway in Pakistani territory was renamed the Pakistan Eastern Railway.

In 1974, Pakistan Western Railway renamed itself to Pakistan Railways.

== See also ==
- History of rail transport in Pakistan
