= History of rail transport in Pakistan =

Rail transport in Pakistan began in 1855 during the British Raj, when several railway companies began laying track and operating in present-day Pakistan. The country's rail system has been nationalised as Pakistan Railways (originally the Pakistan Western Railway). The system was originally a patchwork of local rail lines operated by small private companies, including the Scinde, Punjab and Delhi Railways and the Indus Steam Flotilla. In 1870, the four companies were amalgamated as the Scinde, Punjab & Delhi Railway. Several other rail lines were built shortly thereafter, including the Sind–Sagar and Trans–Baluchistan Railways and the Sind–Pishin, Indus Valley, Punjab Northern and Kandahar State Railways. These six companies and the Scinde, Punjab & Delhi Railway merged to form the North Western State Railway in 1886. It was later renamed as North-Western Railway in 1905, and few decades following the independence of Pakistan in 1947, the North Western Railway which mostly became part of Pakistani territory was renamed Pakistan Western Railway in 1961. It was later renamed as Pakistan Railways in 1974.

== Early development (1855–1870) ==
=== Scinde Railway ===
The Scinde Railway Company was established in 1855, after Karachi's potential as a seaport was first explored in the early 1850s. Henry Bartle Frere, who was appointed Commissioner of Sindh shortly after its fall in the Battle of Miani, sought permission from Lord Dalhousie to begin a survey for a seaport. The Scinde Railway was established by a settlement in March 1855, and was incorporated by Parliament in the Scinde Railway Act of July of that year. Frere began the rail survey in 1858, and a rail line from Karachi to Kotri; steam navigation up the Indus and Chenab Rivers to Multan, and another rail line to Lahore were proposed. Work on the railway began in April 1858, and Karachi and Kotri—a distance of 108 miles (174 km)—were connected by rail on 13 May 1861.

=== Punjab Railway ===
The Punjab Railway was established shortly after the July 1855 passage of the Scinde Railway Act. As the Karachi-to-Kotri line was being constructed and the Indus Steam Flotilla was being set up to transport passengers to Multan, the Punjab Railway was laid from Multan to Lahore and onward to Amritsar. The line opened in 1861, connecting Karachi and Lahore.

=== Indus Steam Flotilla ===
The Indus Steam Flotilla was a freight and passenger steamship company which operated initially between Karachi and Multan and later between Kotri and Multan after the completion of the Karachi-Kotri Railway Line between 1858 and 1870. The Indus Steam Flotilla provided "the navigation of the Indus, &c, by means of steam vessels [sic], between Kotri and Multan, to be worked in connection with the railways." It plied the Indus and Chenab Rivers from Karachi Port in the south to Makhad in the north via Jhirk and Mithankot. The journey between Karachi and Multan alone took up to 40 days. The company had its headquarters in Kotri, and its promoters negotiated the same guaranteed rate of return as the original guaranteed railways. It later merged with the Scinde and Punjab Railways to form the Scinde, Punjab & Delhi Railway. With the Scinde Railway in place, the Indus Flotilla steamers could take cargo from Kotri instead of Karachi (saving about 150 miles (240 km) through the Indus River delta). The railway bypassed Jhirk (Jherruk), reducing its importance. In 1856, the Scinde Railway charter was expanded to include the construction of Punjab Railway connecting Multan

== Mergers and expansion (1870–1885) ==
=== Scinde, Punjab & Delhi Railway ===
The Scinde, Punjab & Delhi Railway was formed in 1870 from the incorporation of the Indus Steam Flotilla and the Scinde, Punjab and Delhi Railways by the Scinde Railway Company's Amalgamation Act of 1869. Deepak The company inherited a reputation as the worst-managed of the early private companies. After its purchase in 1885, the SP&DR was merged with several other railways to form the North Western State Railway (NWR).

=== Indus Valley State Railway ===
The Indus Valley State Railway was undertaken by Scinde Railway chief resident engineer John Brunton, assisted by his son William Arthur Brunton, in 1869–70. The Empress Bridge, opened in 1878, carried the IVSR over the Sutlej River between Ferozepur (Firozpur, south of Lahore) and Kasur. The line reached Sukkur in 1879, and the steam ferry which transported eight wagons at a time across the Indus between Rohri and Sukkur was found to be cumbersome and time-consuming. The opening of the Lansdowne Bridge in 1889 resolved the bottleneck, and Karachi Port was connected to the rail network. With other companies, the Indus Valley State Railway was merged with the Scinde, Punjab & Delhi Railway in 1886 to form the North Western State Railway.

=== Punjab Northern State Railway ===
The Punjab Northern State Railway, opened in 1876, was a line between Lahore and Peshawar. The route of what became the railway was first surveyed in 1857, followed by years of political and military debate. The Punjab Northern State Railway was created in 1870–71 to construct and operate a railway between Lahore and Peshawar. The first section of line (from Lahore to Peshawar) was opened in 1876, and in 1883 the Attock Bridge over the Indus River was completed. Francis Joseph Edward Spring was deployed from the Imperial Civil Service's engineering section in 1873 as consulting engineer for the PNSR survey and the construction of portions of the railway and bridges, and remained attached to the railway until 1878. Several major bridges were constructed to complete the PNSR line from Lahore to Peshawar.

=== Sind–Pishin State Railway ===
Government considered Russia, who might advance from Afghanistan into Quetta, a threat to its rule in the subcontinent. In 1857, Scinde, Punjab and Delhi Railway chairman William Andrew suggested that rail lines to the Bolan Pass would have a strategic role in responding to a Russian threat. During the Second Anglo-Afghan War (1878–80), a new urgency was felt to construct a rail line to Quetta for easier access to the frontier. Work began on the line on 18 September 1879, and the first 215 kilometres (134 mi) from Ruk to Sibi was completed in January 1880. Beyond Sibi, however, the terrain was difficult. After harsh weather, the over-320-kilometre (200 mi) line finally reached Quetta in March 1887.

=== Trans–Baluchistan Railway ===
The Trans-Balochistan Railway ran from Quetta to Taftan and onward to the Iranian city of Zahidan. It was named the Nushki Extension Railway, since its construction began west of Nushki in 1916. The line reached Zahidan in 1922. It is 732 kilometres (455 mi) long, with the last 100-kilometer section in Iran. It is little used, with one fortnightly train between Quetta and Zahidan.

=== Kandahar State Railway ===
The Kandahar State Railway opened in 1881 and originally ran from Sibi and onward to Rindli, with the intention of reaching Quetta and Kandahar. However, the line never reached Quetta. The railway joined with the southern section of the Sind–Pishin State Railway and, in 1886, amalgamated with other railways to form the North Western State Railway (NWR). From Sibi the line ran south-west, skirting the hills to Rindli, and originally followed the Bolan stream to its head on the plateau. Flooding led to the abandonment of this alignment, and the railway follows the Mashkaf Valley. Although the Bolan Pass rail construction enabled the NWR route to be selected, the line was later dismantled.

==== The Sind–Sagar Railway ====
The Sind–Sagar Railway was originally constructed as a Metre Gauge railway line from Lala Musa to Malakwal. In 1886 the Sind–Sagar Railway was amalgamated with other railways to form the North Western State Railway and railway line from was converted to broad gauge. The Chak Nizam Bridge, also known as Victoria Bridge, was completed in early 1887 over the Jhelum river in Shahpur District and connected Jhelum to Lahore. The NWR Sind-Sagar Branch Line was the new name for the line and continued to be extended with branch lines and designated as part of the 'Frontier Section – Military Line'.

== North-Western State Railway (1886–1905) ==
The North Western State Railway (reporting mark NWR) was formed in January 1886 from the merger of the Scinde, Punjab & Delhi Railway, the Indus Valley State Railway, the Punjab Northern State Railway, the eastern section of the Sind–Sagar Railway, the southern section of the Sind–Pishin State Railway and the Kandahar State Railway. The NWR also absorbed several smaller railways, including the Quetta Link Railway (a strategic line constructed by the Scinde, Punjaub & Delhi Railway in 1887), Jammu–Sialkot Railway (opened in 1897), Kasur–Lodhran Railway (opened 1909–10 and later dismantled), Shorekot Road–Chichoki Railway (opened 1910), Sialkot–Narowal Railway (opened 1915), Shahdara Bagh–Narowal Railway (opened 1926) and the Trans–Indus Railway (opened 1913). The military and strategic concerns for securing the border with Afghanistan were such that Francis Langford O'Callaghan, who was posted from the state railways as engineer-in-chief, was called on for a number of demanding railway projects, surveys and constructions in the Northwest Frontier. What began as military and strategic railway projects became part of the North Western State Railway network at its formation in 1886. The Bolan Pass railway was completed in 1886, and the 1887 Khawaja Amran Railway Survey included the Khojak Tunnel and the Chaman Extension Railway. The Khojak Tunnel opened in 1891 and the railway reached Chaman, near the Afghan border.

== North-Western Railway (1905–1961) ==
The North Western State Railway was renamed as North Western Railway in 1905. By 1905, it was the longest railway under one administration and the strategic railway of the Northwest Frontier. Following the partition of British India and independence of Pakistan in 1947, most of the North Western Railway infrastructure became part of the Pakistani territory; the Indian portion was incorporated into the Eastern Punjab Railway.

== Pakistan Western Railway (1961–1974) ==
On 1 February 1961, the North-Western Railway was renamed the Pakistan Western Railway. In East Bengal, the portion of the Assam Bengal Railway in Pakistani territory was renamed the Pakistan Eastern Railway.

The railway was extended to Mardan and Charsada in 1954, and two years later the Jacobabad–Kashmore 2 ft 6 in (762 mm) line was converted to 5 ft 6 in (1,676 mm) broad gauge. In 1961, the Pakistani portion of the North Western Railway was renamed Pakistan Railways. The Kot Adu–Kashmore line, constructed between 1969 and 1973, provided an alternative route north from Karachi.

== Pakistan Railways (1974–present) ==
In 1974, Pakistan Western Railways was renamed Pakistan Railways.

== Gallery ==
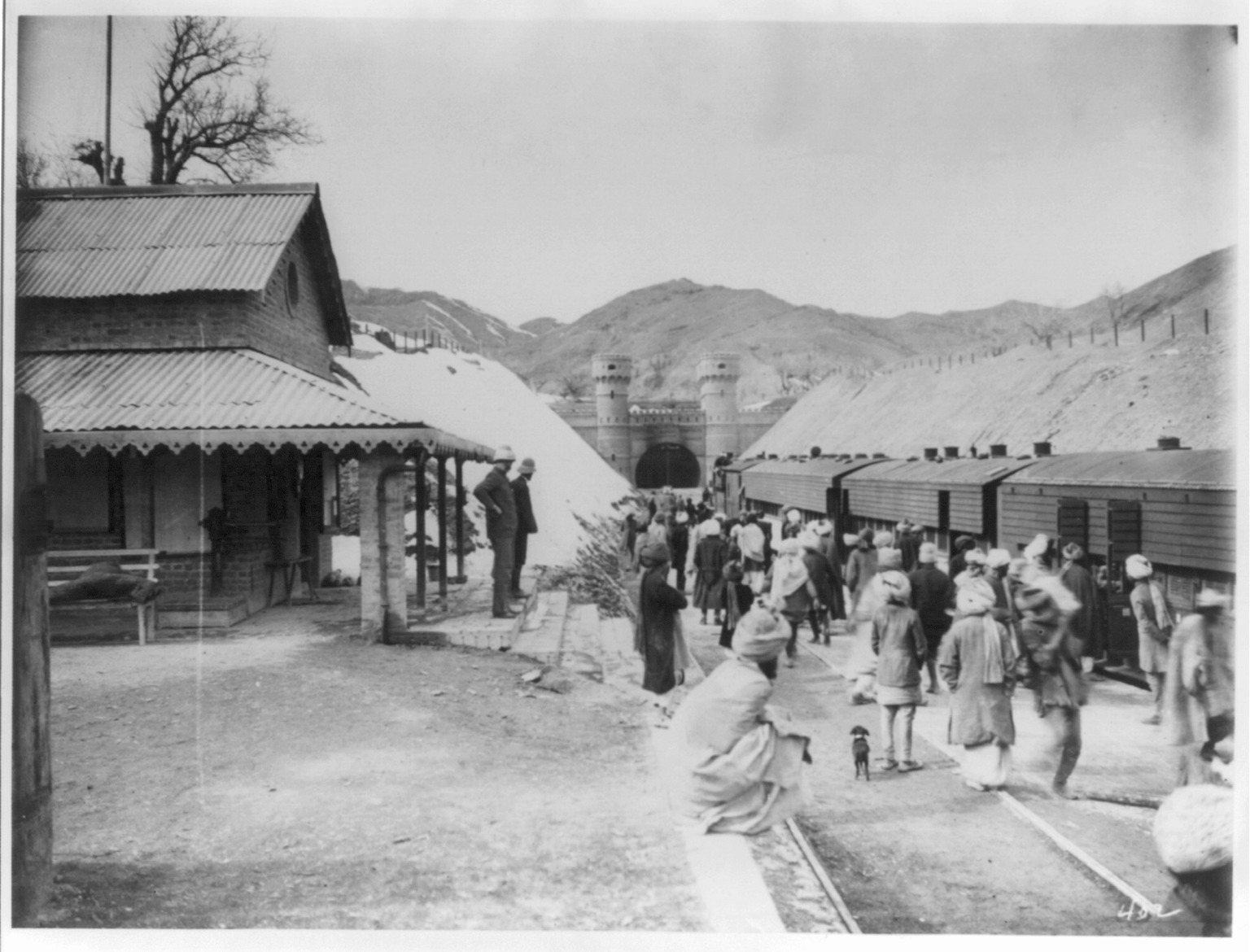
Gulistan Station on the Great Military Railway at entrance to Khojak Tunnel (1895)

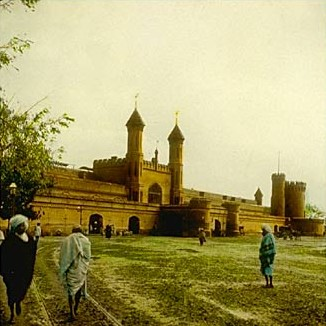
Magic lantern image of Lahore Railway Station around 1895

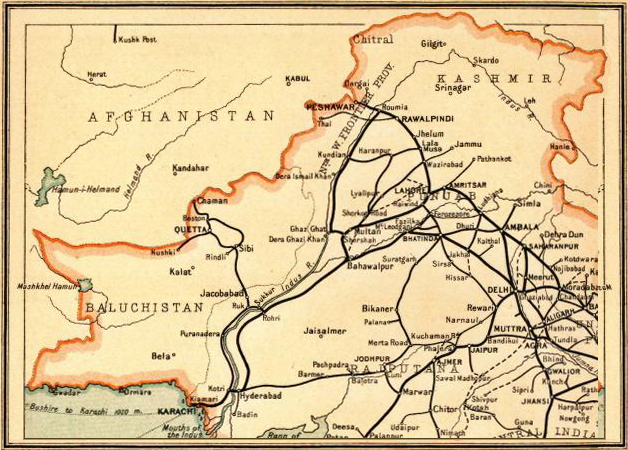
North Western Railway network in 1909

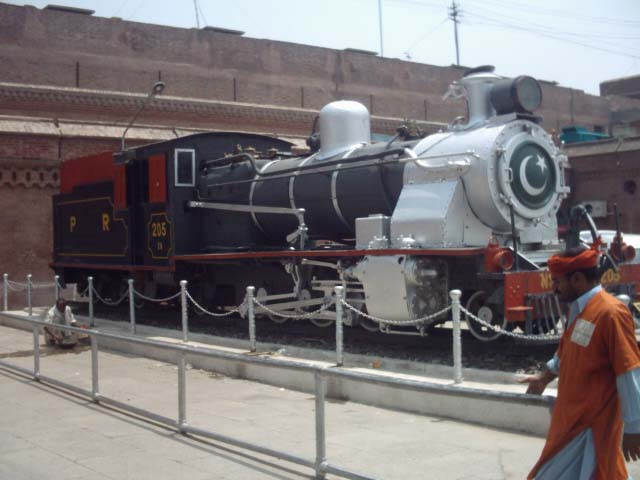
Narrow-gauge ZB-class number 205 (Hanomag 10761, 1932) at Lahore rail station

== See also ==
- History of rail transport
- Pakistan Eastern Railway
- Pakistan Western Railway
- Sind–Sagar Railway
