= Ali Ahmad Talpur =

Pakistani politician (d. 1987)

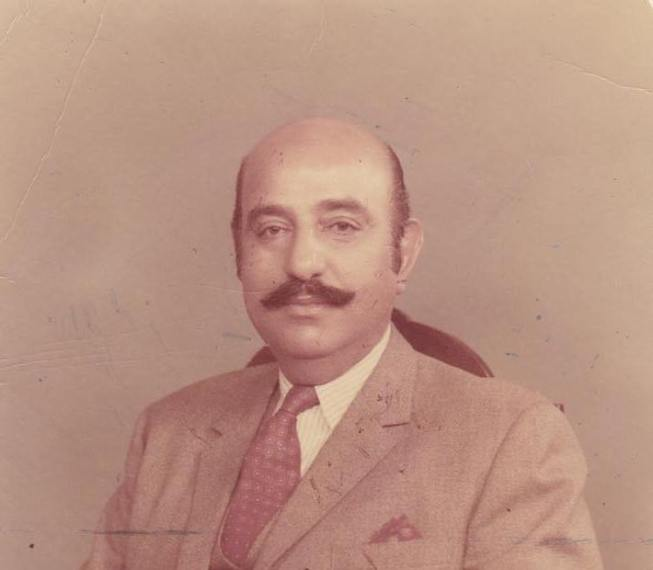

15th Minister of Defence
- In office 27 August 1978 – 25 February 1985
- President: Muhammad Zia-ul-Haq

Personal details
- Born: Hyderabad, Sindh
- Died: April 1987
- Children: Mir Mohammad Ali Talpur
- Relatives: Mir Rasool Bux Talpur (Brother)

Mir Ali Ahmed Khan Talpur (died 5 April 1987) was a Pakistani politician who served as the 15th defence minister of Pakistan from 1978 to 1985 in the government of general Zia-ul-Haq. Prior to his appointment as defence minister, he served as agriculture and food minister in East Pakistan from 1955 to 56.

== Biography ==
Mir Sahib was born on 31 August 1915 in his hometown Tando Mir Mahmood Hyderabad, Sindh in the house of Mir Nabi Bakhsh Khan Talpur. He started his political career when he joined Jamiat Ulema-e-Hind in 1936. Later in 1939, he joined Khaksar movement when Inayatullah Khan Mashriqi invited him. When Mashriqui was imprisoned in 1941, Talpur was elected as the acting head of the movement for the 22 months. However, in 1944 he disassociated himself from the movement after Allama wrote a letter to him concerning his role in forming Fidayeen-e-Ameer (Islamic military organisation) in Sindh against the movement, and he subsequently joined the Indian National Congress to participate in the Indian independence movement. He allegedly opposed the partition of India. When Pakistan was formed as a sovereign state in 1947, he was imprisoned for six months under court-martial law.

He was among the five cabinet ministers to support Zia's campaign for Islamic law enforcement in Pakistan. He had been living in London for the purpose of treatment since October 1986, where he died on 5 April 1987. Mir's body was brought back to country and buried in his ancestral graveyard "Ganju Takkar" in Hyderabad, Sindh on 8 April 1987. President of the country, Provincial Governors high military and senior civil officials and Political and social figures participated in Mir Sahib's funeral prayer, the prayer was led by Moulana Muhammad Ali Rezvi, ex:MNA. Sindh Jo Syed Sain G.M Syed was also present on this time.
