= Mian Zahid Sarfraz =

Pakistani politician

Member of the National Assembly of Pakistan
- In office 1990–1993
- Constituency: NA-64 (Faisalabad-VIII)

Minister of Interior
- In office 7 October 1990 – 6 November 1990
- Prime Minister: Ghulam Mustafa Jatoi

Minister of Commerce
- In office 5 July 1978 – 21 April 1979
- President: Muhammad Zia-ul-Haq

Mian Zahid Sarfraz is a Pakistani politician. He served as the minister of commerce under President Muhammad Zia-ul-Haq from July 1978 to April 1979. He later briefly served as minister of interior in 1990 and was elected to the National Assembly of Pakistan from Faisalabad.

== Political career ==
Sarfraz was inducted into the first federal cabinet formed by Zia-ul-Haq on 5 July 1978 and was assigned the commerce portfolio. When the second presidential cabinet was formed on 23 August 1978, he was re-inducted with the same portfolio and remained in office until 21 April 1979.

In the 1990 Pakistani general election, he was elected to the National Assembly from Constituency NA-64 (Faisalabad-VIII). During the transition following the election, he served as minister of interior from 7 October to 6 November 1990.

He remained active in party politics in the 2000s. By 2012, he was serving as chief organiser of the All Pakistan Muslim League.

== Personal life ==
Sarfraz is the father of Muhammad Ali Sarfraz, who was elected to the National Assembly in 2024.
