= Fazil Janjua =

Pakistani naval officer

Minister of Food, Agriculture and Cooperatives
- In office 21 April 1979 – March 1985
- President: Muhammad Zia-ul-Haq

Personal details
- Occupation: Naval officer
- Awards: Hilal-i-Imtiaz (Military)

Fazil Janjua was a Pakistan Navy vice admiral who served as the federal minister for food, agriculture and cooperatives under President Zia-ul-Haq. He was inducted into Zia's third federal cabinet on 21 April 1979 and continued in the same portfolio in the fourth federal cabinet formed on 9 March 1981, remaining in office until 1985.

== Political career ==
Janjua was among the military members of Zia-ul-Haq's federal cabinet. In the third cabinet of the regime, he was appointed minister of food, agriculture and cooperatives. When Zia's fourth cabinet took office on 9 March 1981, Janjua continued with the same portfolio.

In October 1980, he presided over the annual passing out ceremony of the Pakistan Forest Institute in Peshawar in his capacity as minister for food, agriculture and cooperatives. He again presided over the institute's passing-out ceremony in September 1982 while holding the same office.

In December 1984, Janjua visited Tehran on an official trip as Pakistan's federal minister for food and agriculture.

In January 2008, Janjua was among a group of retired senior military officers who called on President Pervez Musharraf to step down.
