= Chaudhry Rehmat Elahi =

Pakistani politician and Jamaat-e-Islami leader

- چودھری رحمت الٰہی

Minister for Water and Power
- In office 23 August 1978 – 21 April 1979
- President: Muhammad Zia-ul-Haq

Personal details
- Born: 1923 Jhelum District, Punjab, British India
- Died: 5 January 2019 (aged 95–96) Lahore, Punjab, Pakistan
- Party: Jamaat-e-Islami
- Occupation: Politician

Chaudhry Rehmat Elahi (Urdu: چودھری رحمت الٰہی; 1923 – 5 January 2019) was a Pakistani politician and senior leader of Jamaat-e-Islami who served as the federal minister for water and power under President Muhammad Zia-ul-Haq from August 1978 to April 1979. He later served Jamaat-e-Islami as its deputy emir and secretary general, and was regarded as one of the party's old guards and a close associate of Abul A'la Maududi.

== Early life ==
Elahi was born in 1923 in Jhelum District. After completing his graduation, he joined the British Indian Armed Forces. He later left military service and joined Jamaat-e-Islami, becoming one of the movement's early workers.

== Political career ==
By 1969, Elahi was serving as secretary general of Jamaat-e-Islami Pakistan.

Elahi was inducted into Zia-ul-Haq's second presidential cabinet formed on 23 August 1978 and served as minister for water and power until the cabinet resigned on 21 April 1979.

In later years, he held senior organisational positions in Jamaat-e-Islami, including deputy emir and secretary general. He also served briefly as acting emir of the party in 1994 after the temporary resignation of Qazi Hussain Ahmad.
