= Delhi Railway =

Railway Company Operated in British India

- Industry: Railways
- Defunct: 1870
- Successor: Scinde, Punjab & Delhi Railway
- Headquarters: Delhi, British India
- Area served: Punjab
- Services: Rail transport

The Delhi Railway (reporting mark DR) was a railway company that operated in British India. It later merged with Scinde Railway, Punjab Railway and Indus Steam Flotilla to form the Scinde, Punjab & Delhi Railway.
