= Eastern Punjab Railway =

Railway in India

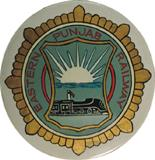
- Industry: Railways
- Predecessor: North Western State Railway
- Successor: Northern Railway
- Headquarters: India
- Area served: East Punjab
- Services: Rail transport

The Eastern Punjab Railway was the successor of the North Western State Railway in East Punjab after the partition of India. In 1952, Northern Railway was formed with a portion of East Indian Railway Company, north-west of Mughalsarai, Jodhpur Railway, Bikaner Railway and Eastern Punjab Railway.

It was labeled as a Class I railway according to Indian Railway Classification System.
