= Afifa Mamdot =

Pakistani politician

Minister of State for Health, Social Welfare and Special Education
- In office 1981–1984
- President: Zia-ul-Haq

Member of the Provincial Assembly of the Punjab
- In office 1988–1990

Personal details
- Born: Afifa Jamal Leghari; 7 September 1928
- Died: 19 January 2025 (aged 96) Lahore, Punjab, Pakistan
- Spouse: Zulfiqar Ali Khan Mamdot
- Relatives: Farooq Leghari (nephew)
- Occupation: Politician

Afifa Mamdot (born Afifa Jamal Leghari; 7 September 1928 – 19 January 2025) was a Pakistani politician and Pakistan Movement activist who served in the federal government as minister of state for health, social welfare and special education during the rule of President Muhammad Zia-ul-Haq. She later served as a member of the Provincial Assembly of the Punjab from 1988 to 1990 and also represented Pakistan at the United Nations.

== Early life and family ==
Mamdot was born as Afifa Jamal Leghari on 7 September 1928. She was the eldest daughter of Nawab Sir Jamal Khan Leghari, chief of the Leghari Alyani tribe of the Baloch.

She married Nawabzada Zulfiqar Ali Khan Mamdot, son of Nawab Shahnawaz Khan of Mamdot, a prominent figure in the Pakistan Movement and the Muslim League. Former president Farooq Leghari was her nephew.

== Political career ==
Mamdot served in the federal government under Zia-ul-Haq as minister of state for social welfare.

She also represented Pakistan at the United Nations. During the 33rd session of the UN General Assembly's Special Political Committee, she introduced a draft resolution on behalf of Pakistan.

Mamdot served as a member of the assembly from 1988 to 1990. She had contested elections in Dera Ghazi Khan in 1988 on the ticket of the Islami Jamhoori Ittehad.
