= Zardalu railway station =

Railway station in Pakistan

Coordinates: 30.222959°N 67.578119°E

Zardalu Railway Station زردالو ریلوے اسٹیشن

General information
- Owner: Ministry of Railways
- Line: Kandahar State Railway

Other information
- Station code: ZLU

Services
Preceding station	Pakistan Railways	Following station
Khost towards Sibi Junction	Kandahar State Railway	Terminus
Location

Zardalu Railway Station (Urdu: زردالو ریلوے اسٹیشن, Balochi: زردالو ریلوے اسٹیشن) is located in Balochistan, Pakistan.

== See also ==
- List of railway stations in Pakistan
- Pakistan Railways
