= Punjab Railway =

- Industry: Railways
- Founded: 1857
- Defunct: 1870
- Headquarters: Lahore, Punjab, British Raj
- Area served: Punjab
- Services: Rail transport

The Punjab Railway (reporting mark PR) was one of the pioneering railway companies that operated during the British Raj between 1855 and 1885 in Punjab.

== History ==
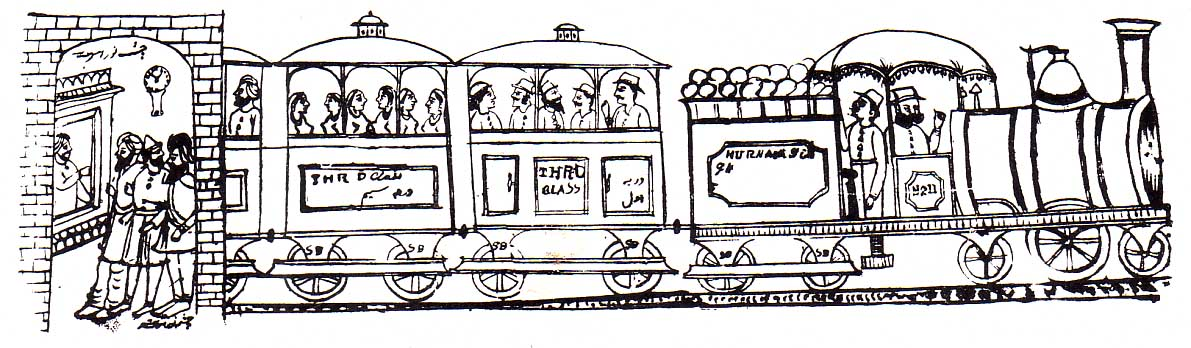
'A Railway Train', lithographed sketch by Hurnam Singh, circa mid-19th century

The Punjab Railway was established shortly after the Scinde Railway Act of Parliament in July 1855 was passed. The Punjab Railway began soon after the Karachi-Kotri Railway Line opened on 13 May 1861. The Indus Flotilla was set up to transport passengers from Kotri to Multan by steamship. From Multan, a new railway line began being laid from to Lahore and onwards to Amritsar. The line opened in 1861 and in 1870, the Punjab Railway was amalgamated with the Scinde Railway and Delhi Railway companies and renamed as the Scinde, Punjab & Delhi Railway company.

== Rolling stock ==
By the end of 1864 the company owned 8 steam locomotives, 36 coaches and 140 goods wagons.

== See also ==
- History of rail transport in Pakistan
- Pakistan Railways
- Scinde, Punjab & Delhi Railway
