= Scinde Railway =

Railway company in British India

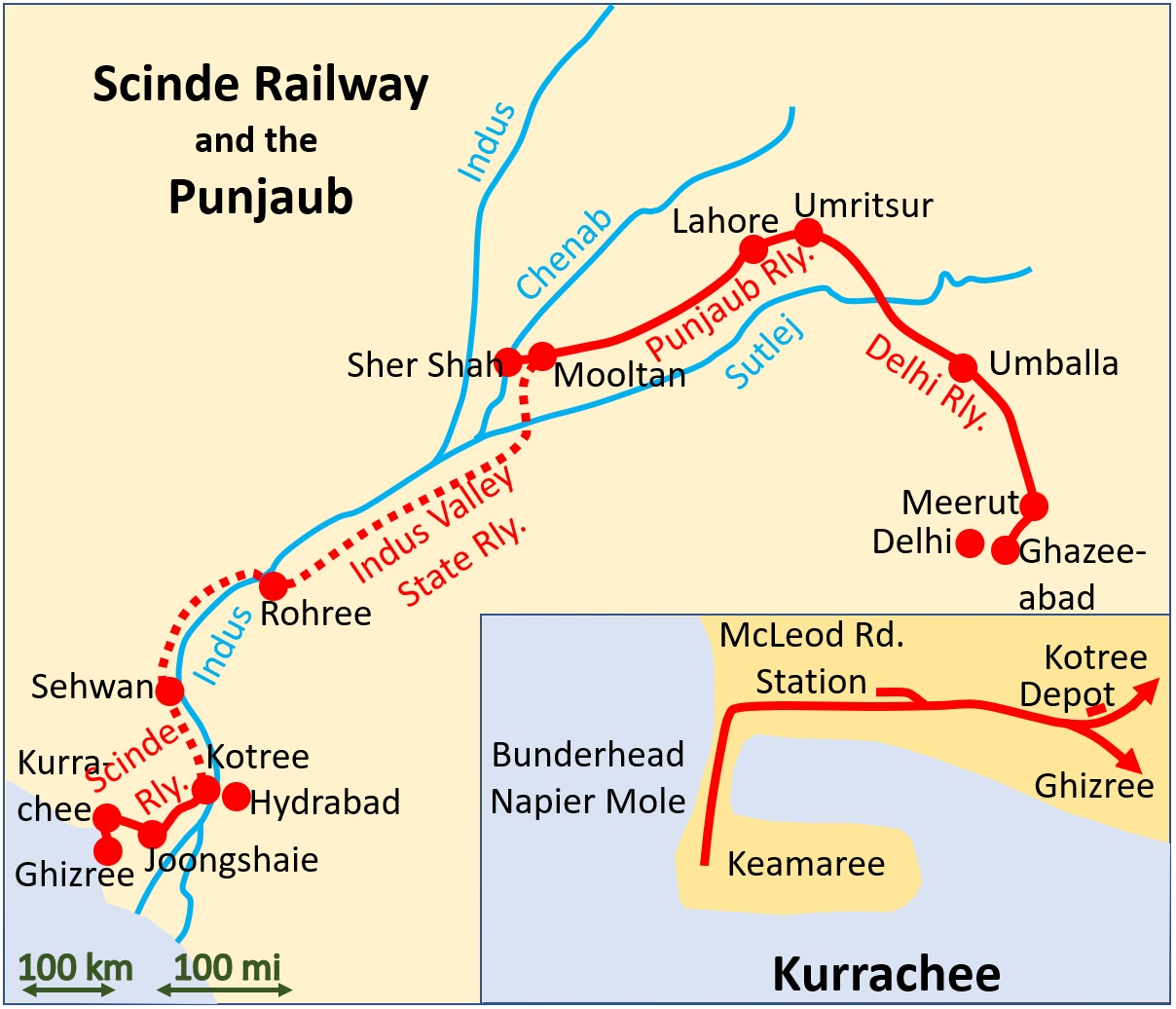
- Industry: Railways
- Founded: 1857
- Defunct: 1870
- Headquarters: Karachi, Sind, British Raj
- Area served: Sindh
- Services: Rail transport

The Scinde Railway (Sindhi: سند ريلوي) (reporting mark SR) was one of the pioneering railway companies that operated in Sind during the British Raj between 1855 and 1885.

== History ==
Scinde Railway Act 1855 (Note: Section 1.)
- Act of Parliament
- Parliament of the United Kingdom
- Long title: An Act for incorporating the Scinde Railway Company, and for other Purposes connected therewith.
- Citation: 18 & 19 Vict. c. cxv
- Territorial extent: United Kingdom

Dates
- Royal assent: 2 July 1855
- Commencement: 2 July 1855 (Note: The Acts of Parliament (Commencement) Act 1793.)
- Repealed: 25 August 1857

Other legislation
- Repealed by: Scinde Railway Act 1857

Status: Repealed

Text of statute as originally enacted

Scinde Railway Act 1857
- Act of Parliament
- Parliament of the United Kingdom
- Long title: An Act for authorising the Scinde Railway Company to extend their Operations, and for regulating the Capital of the Company; and for other Purposes.
- Citation: 20 & 21 Vict. c. clx
- Territorial extent: United Kingdom

Dates
- Royal assent: 25 August 1857
- Commencement: 25 August 1857
- Repealed: 31 January 2013

Other legislation
- Repeals/revokes: Scinde Railway Act 1855
- Repealed by: Statute Law (Repeals) Act 2013

Status: Repealed

Text of statute as originally enacted

Scinde Railway Company's Amalgamation Act 1869
- Act of Parliament
- Parliament of the United Kingdom
- Long title: An Act for authorising the Scinde Railway Company to amalgamate their several undertakings, and to make further agreements with the Secretary of State in Council of India; and for other purposes.
- Citation: 32 & 33 Vict. c. lxxx
- Territorial extent: United Kingdom

Dates
- Royal assent: 12 July 1869
- Commencement: 12 July 1869
- Repealed: 31 January 2013

Other legislation
- Repealed by: Statute Law (Repeals) Act 2013

Status: Repealed

Text of statute as originally enacted

The Scinde Railway was first established by deed of settlement in March 1855 and incorporated by the Scinde Railway Act 1855 (18 & 19 Vict. c. cxv) in July of that year. The company contracted with the government to construct a line between Karachi and Kotri. The company was granted a 5% return on investment up to a maximum of £1 million in order to build the 120-mile line. The Karachi-Kotri Railway Line work commenced in April 1858 and on 13 May 1861 succeeded in connecting Karachi to Kotri. This was the first railway line for public use between Karachi and Kotri, a distance of 108 miles (174 km). The company was involved in a number of additional railway line projects, as well as the establishment of the Indus Steam Flotilla along the Indus River and Chenab River. The Scinde Railway Act 1857 (20 & 21 Vict. c. clx) granted it the opportunity to extend its operations. In 1870, the Scinde Railway Company was amalgamated with the Punjab Railway and Delhi Railway companies and renamed as the Scinde, Punjab & Delhi Railway company. This was covered by the Scinde Railway Company's Amalgamation Act 1869 (32 & 33 Vict. c. lxxx).

== Rolling stock ==
By the end of 1864 the company owned 31 steam locomotives, 66 coaches and 617 goods wagons.

== Personnel ==
- John Brunton: (1857), appointed chief resident engineer of Scinde Railway, (1858–62) supervised the construction of the 108 miles (174 kilometers) Scinde Railway line between Karachi and Kotri until its completion in 1862. His detailed "Description of the line and works of the Scinde Railway" itemise the problems of building the line.
- William Arthur Brunton, (son of John Brunton): (1857) at age 17, assistant engineer and later area surveyor on the Scinde Railway and Indus Valley State Railway, (1859-1861) responsible for the erection of the thirty-two 45 foot (13.7 meter) span of Bahrun Valley Viaduct. This is the longest bridge on the Karachi-Kotri section and is a viaduct across the Bahrun River. Construction on this bridge was started on 5 March 1859 and completed on 26 January 1861.
- Willoughby Charles Furnivall: (c.1860-70), district engineer in charge of construction under John Brunton

== See also ==
- History of rail transport in Pakistan
- Pakistan Railways
- Punjab Railway
- Scinde, Punjab & Delhi Railway
