= North Western State Railway =

Railway company in British India

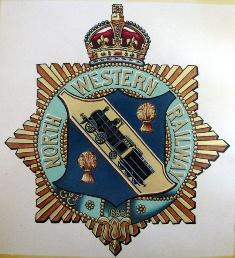
- Logo of North Western Railway (1905-1947)

Overview
- Locale: Punjab Province; Sind Province; North-West Frontier Province; Baluchistan, Karachi, British Raj
- Dates of operation: 1886–1905
- Predecessor: Scinde, Punjab & Delhi Railway; Indus Valley State Railway; Punjab Northern State Railway; Sind–Sagar Railway; Sind–Pishin State Railway; Kandahar State Railway
- Successor: North Western Railway (1905-1947); Pakistan Western Railway (1947-1971); Pakistan Railways (1971 – present); Eastern Punjab Railway

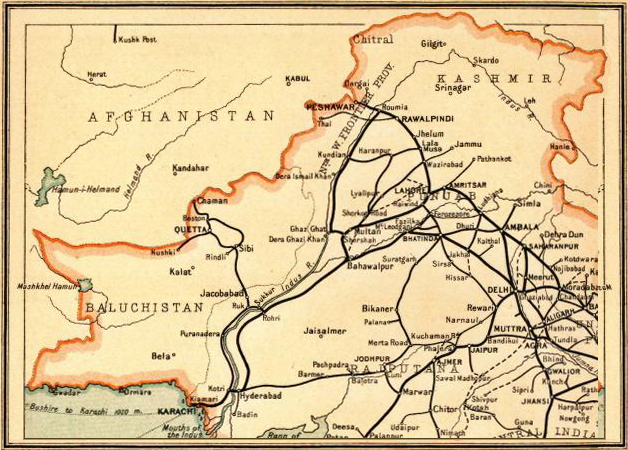
1909 Map of the North Western Railway

The North Western State Railway (NWSR) was formed in January 1886 from the merger of the Scinde, Punjab & Delhi Railway, the Indus Valley State Railway, the Punjab Northern State Railway, the eastern section of the Sind–Sagar Railway and the southern section of the Sind–Pishin State Railway and the Kandahar State Railway.

== History ==
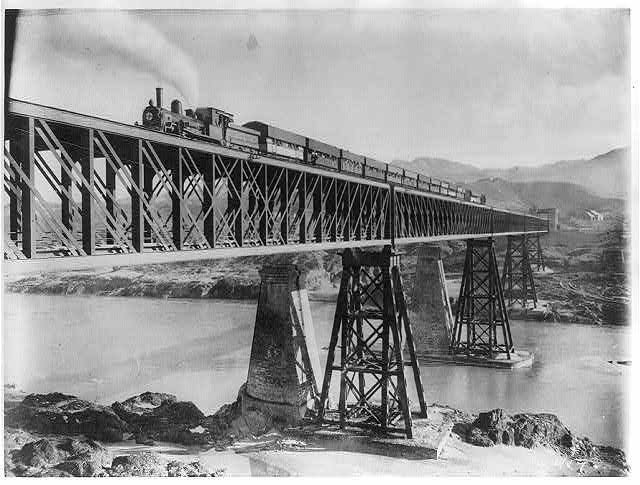
Fortified North Western State Railway bridge over the Indus at Attock, 1895

The military and strategic concerns for securing the border with Afghanistan were such that, Francis Langford O'Callaghan (who was posted from the state railways as engineer-in-chief) was called upon for a number of demanding railway projects, surveys and constructions in the Northwest Frontier. What initially started off as military and strategic railway project, ended up becoming part of the North Western State Railway network upon its formation in 1886. The Bolan Pass railway was completed in 1886 and in 1887 the Khawaja Amran Railway Survey included the Khojak Tunnel and the Chaman Extension Railway. The Khojak Tunnel opened in 1891 and the railway reached Chaman near the Afghan border. By 1905, it was the longest railway under one administration and the strategic railway of the entire Northwest frontier. The North Western State Railway was renamed as North Western Railway in 1905. In 1947, much of the North Western Railway fell in Pakistan territory domain and became part of the Pakistan Western Railways, while railways in Indian territory became incorporated into the Eastern Punjab Railway.

== Mergers ==
The North Western State Railway network was formed by merging several major and minor railways together. These included:

=== Major railways absorbed ===
- Scinde, Punjab & Delhi Railway
- Indus Valley State Railway
- Punjab Northern State Railway
- Sind–Sagar Railway
- Sind–Pishin State Railway
- Kandahar State Railway
- Trans–Baluchistan Railway

=== Minor railways absorbed ===
- Quetta Link Railway, opened in 1887
- Jammu–Sialkot Railway, opened in 1897
- Kasur–Lodhran Railway, opened in 1909, dismantled in 1917 and rebuilt in 1922
- Shorekot Road–Chichoki Railway, opened in 1910
- Trans–Indus Railway, opened 1913
- Sialkot–Narowal Railway, opened in 1915
- Shahdara Bagh–Narowal Railway, opened in 1926

== Construction ==
The North Western State Railway undertook a major railway expansion program, which included:

- Amritsar–Patti Railway, opened in 1906 and extended to Kasur in 1910
- Bahawalnagar–Fort Abbas Railway, opened in 1928 and financed by the Princely Bahawalpur State
- Mari Indus Railway, opened in 1913
- Bannu Railway, under survey in 1909 but never constructed
- Dandot Light Railway, opened in 1905 to serve the Khewra Salt Mine
- Hyderabad–Badin Railway, opened in 1905, dismantled in 1917 and rebuilt in 1922
- Jacobabad–Kashmore Railway, opened in 1911
- Mari–Attock Railway, opened in 1891
- Kotri–Rohri Railway, opened in 1900 following the completion of Kotri Bridge in 1899
- Khanai–Hindubagh Railway, opened in 1921
- Khanpur–Chachran Railway, opened in 1911 and financed by the Princely State of Bahawalpur
- Khushalgarh–Kohat–Thal Railway
- Khyber Pass Railway, opened in 1925 as a strategic line to Afghanistan
- Larkana–Jacobabad Light Railway, opened in 1921
- Mandra–Bhaun Railway, opened in 1915
- Mushkaf–Bolan Railway
- Nowshera–Dargai Railway, opened in 1901
- Patti–Kasur Railway, opened in 1909
- Sirhind–Rupar Railway, opened in 1927
- Wazirabad–Multan Railway, opened in 1899
- Zhob Valley Railway, opened in 1921

== Rolling stock ==
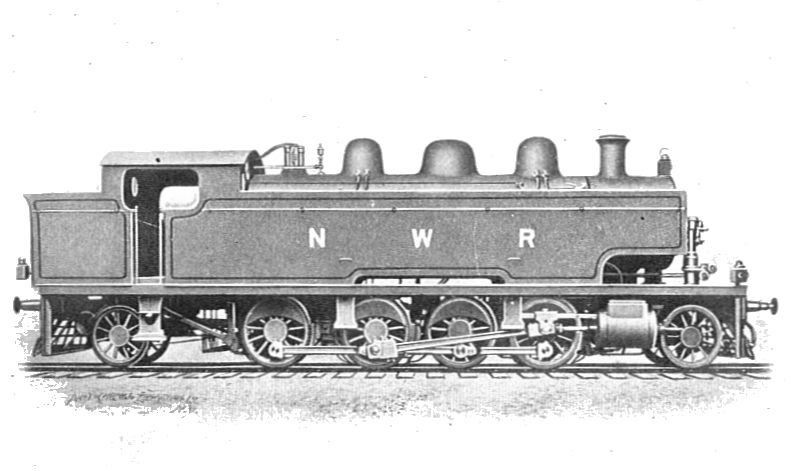
Tank locomotive, built around 1907 for service on the Bolān Pass.

In 1899 the North Western State Railway owned 602 steam locomotives, 2,121 coaches and 10,312 goods wagons. In 1906 a steam motor coach from Vulcan Foundry was purchased. By 1936, the rolling stock had increased to 1332 locomotives, 18 railcars, 1,494 coaches and more than 30,000 freight wagons.

== Classification ==
It was labeled as a Class I railway according to Indian Railway Classification System of 1926.

== See also ==
- History of rail transport in Pakistan
- Pakistan Railways
- Scinde, Punjab & Delhi Railway
- North Western Railway School
- Jhandi railway station, an abandoned city station on a narrow gauge track in Kohat
