= Saeed Qadir =

Pakistani military officer

Minister of Production
- In office 9 March 1981 – 24 March 1985
- President: Zia-ul-Haq

Minister for Railways
- In office 16 March 1981 – 5 March 1983
- President: Muhammad Zia-ul-Haq

Personal details
- Occupation: Military officer

Saeed Qadir is a Pakistani military officer who served in the federal cabinet of President Zia-ul-Haq. He served as the federal minister for production from March 1981 to March 1985, and also held the railways portfolio from March 1981 to March 1983.

== Career ==
Qadir was inducted into Zia-ul-Haq's fourth federal cabinet, which took oath on 9 March 1981. He served as a minister of production and led the National Logistic Board. He also served as the federal railways minister from 16 March 1981 to 5 March 1983.

In later years, Qadir served as chairman of Pakistan Steel Mills and Privatisation Commission. He was later imprisoned due to his role in unfair privitization of state-owned companies.
