= Mohyuddin Ahmedzai Baloch =

Pakistani politician

Mohyuddin Ahmedzai Baloch (1942–2021) was a Pakistani politician.

== Biography ==
Mohyuddin, born on November 5, 1942, in Khanate of Kalat to Mir Ahmed Yar Khan Ahmedzai, the Khan of Kalat. He received his early education at Government Dawood High School in Kalat before continuing his studies in Quetta.

During the martial law regime of Ayub Khan in 1958, he and his father were detained and spent several years in prison. In the 1970s, when his father was appointed Governor of Balochistan, Mohyuddin served as his principal staff secretary until the government of Prime Minister Zulfikar Ali Bhutto was overthrown by Muhammad Zia-ul-Haq.

Mohyuddin entered politics in 1985, being elected as a member of the National Assembly in the non-party elections held under General Zia's regime. Although considered for the prime ministership, the position went to Muhammad Khan Junejo, under whom Mohyuddin served as Federal Minister for Communications and later as Minister for Trade.

After the 1988 elections, he co-founded the Baloch Rabita Ittifaq Tehreek in Karachi with his younger brother, Yahya Ahmedzai Baloch, establishing branches both within Pakistan and internationally.
