= Jamal Said Mian =

Pakistani military officer and politician

- Lieutenant General Jamal Said Mian

Minister for Water and Power
- In office 28 January 1986 – 20 December 1986

Minister for Culture and Tourism
- In office 21 May 1985 – 28 January 1986

Member of the Senate of Pakistan
- In office March 1985 – March 1991
- Constituency: FATA

Minister for States and Frontier Regions
- In office 5 July 1978 – 23 August 1978
- President: Muhammad Zia-ul-Haq

Personal details
- Born: Shakardara, Kurram Agency, British India
- Died: 15 October 2026 Islamabad, Pakistan
- Resting place: Shakardara, Kurram District, Khyber Pakhtunkhwa, Pakistan
- Awards: Hilal-i-Imtiaz (Military), Sitara-i-Basalat

Military service
- Allegiance: Pakistan
- Branch/service: Pakistan Army
- Rank: Lieutenant General
- Unit: Artillery

Jamal Said Mian was a Pakistani military officer and politician who served in the Pakistan Army, rising to the rank of lieutenant general, before entering federal politics. He held several ministerial portfolios during the governments of President Muhammad Zia-ul-Haq and Prime Minister Muhammad Khan Junejo. His federal appointments included Minister for States and Frontier Regions, Railways, Local Government and Rural Development, Kashmir Affairs and Northern Areas, Culture and Tourism, and Water and Power.

Mian was elected to the Senate of Pakistan as an independent member representing the Federally Administered Tribal Areas (FATA) in March 1985 and served until March 1991. He belonged to an influential Tori family of Kurram Agency in the former FATA. He was among the military officers from the tribal areas who attained general officer rank in the Pakistan Army.

== Early life and family ==
Mian belonged to an influential Tori family from Kurram Agency, then part of the Federally Administered Tribal Areas in north-western Pakistan. The Center for Research and Security Studies (CRSS), in its 2018 report FATA Tribes: Finally Out of Colonial Clutches? Past, Present and Future, identified General (retired) Jamal Said Mian and former senator Sajjad Mian as members of an influential family of the area.

His ancestral village was Shakardara in Kurram. Following his death in October 2026, he was buried in the village beside his father.

== Military career ==
=== Indian Military Academy ===
Mian's military career began in the period surrounding the independence and partition of British India in 1947. He has been described as one of the senior Muslim cadets of the Indian Military Academy (IMA), Dehradun, who opted to join the newly established Pakistan Army.

The transfer of Muslim cadets from the IMA took place amid the deteriorating security situation following the partition of British India. In an account published in Defence Journal, military historian Hamid Hussain described how Muslim cadets who had opted for Pakistan were evacuated from Dehradun in October 1947 in an operation known as Operation Exodus.

The article describes the roles of two IMA instructors, Major Tikka Khan, an artillery officer who later became Chief of Army Staff of Pakistan, and Major Atiq ur Rahman, in the movement of Muslim personnel to Pakistan. Atiq ur Rahman was involved in bringing the remaining Muslim elements of the academy and Muslim soldiers from various units to Pakistan. Some of the personnel travelled through Bombay.

The commissioning of the senior cadets who arrived from the IMA has also been associated with 20 October 1947. The historical article Partition of the IMA, published by The Tribune, discusses the date with reference to Lieutenant General Sushil Kumar's book Jawan to General.

The junior cadets continued their training at the newly established Pakistan Military Academy at Kakul. According to Hussain, 66 cadets from the third post-war IMA course were among those heading to Pakistan, while new cadets selected in Pakistan began training at Kakul in January 1948.

=== Forty-Seveners ===
Following the partition of British India in 1947, Muslim cadets at the Indian Military Academy who opted for Pakistan were transferred to the newly established Pakistan Army. The transfer took place in October 1947 under an evacuation operation known as Operation Exodus. An account of the IMA's partition states that 45 cadets left for Pakistan on 14 October 1947 and were commissioned on 20 October 1947 after arriving at Chaklala.

Jamal Said Mian has been associated with the group of senior IMA cadets who opted for Pakistan in 1947 and became known as the "Forty-Seveners" or IMA seniors.

Senior cadets of the IMA's second post-war course, who had been scheduled to graduate in December 1947, were commissioned on arrival at Pakistan Army General Headquarters by the Adjutant General, Major General N. A. M. Raza.

=== Senior military service ===
Mian continued his military career in the Pakistan Army and rose to the rank of lieutenant general. A 2015 report in The News International on the representation of people from FATA in the army identified Lieutenant General Jamal Said Mian among the generals originating from the tribal areas.

The report also named other senior officers from the region, including Lieutenant Generals Alam Jan Mehsud, K. K. Afridi, Ishaq Orakzai and Ali Mohammad Jan Aurakzai.

The official Cabinet Division record for the period 9 March 1981 to 24 March 1985 lists him as Lieutenant General Jamal Said Mian and records the honours HI(M) and S Bt after his name. These designations refer to the Hilal-i-Imtiaz (Military) and Sitara-i-Basalat.

== Political career ==
After his military service, Mian entered public life and served in several federal ministerial positions under President Zia-ul-Haq and Prime Minister Muhammad Khan Junejo. He also represented the Federally Administered Tribal Areas in the Senate.

=== Minister for States and Frontier Regions (1978) ===
On 5 July 1978, Mian was appointed Minister for States and Frontier Regions in the first formal federal cabinet formed by President and Chief Martial Law Administrator General Muhammad Zia-ul-Haq. At the time, he held the rank of major general.

The book Working with Zia: Pakistan's Power Politics 1977–1988 identifies Major-General Jamal Said Mian as the minister responsible for States and Frontier Regions in Zia's first formal cabinet.

Mian's tenure in the portfolio ended on 23 August 1978, when the first cabinet resigned and a second cabinet was formed under Zia-ul-Haq.

=== Railways and Local Government and Rural Development (1979–1980) ===
Mian returned to the federal cabinet in the third cabinet of the Zia-ul-Haq government, which took office on 21 April 1979. He was appointed Minister for Railways and Local Government and Rural Development.

He held these portfolios during the period of the third federal cabinet. The original cabinet record lists his appointments from 21 April 1979 to 31 March 1980.

=== Kashmir Affairs, Northern Areas, Local Government and Rural Development, and Culture and Tourism (1983–1985) ===
Mian returned to the federal cabinet during the fourth cabinet of Zia-ul-Haq. According to the official Cabinet Division record, he held the portfolios of Kashmir Affairs and Northern Areas, Local Government and Rural Development, and Culture and Tourism from 5 March 1983 to 24 March 1985.

The official record identifies him as Lieutenant General Jamal Said Mian and lists his military honours alongside his name.

In May 1983, Mian participated in an official visit to the offices of the Aga Khan Rural Support Programme in Gilgit during a visit by the Aga Khan IV. The programme's contemporary record, dated 13 May 1983, lists him among the Pakistani participants as Lieutenant General Jamal Said Mian, Minister for Kashmir Affairs and Northern Areas. Other participants included Major General Pir Dad Khan, Martial Law Administrator of Zone E, and Brigadier Safdar Ali, Director General of the Northern Areas Works Organization.

=== Minister for Culture and Tourism (1985–1986) ===
Following the 1985 general election and the formation of Prime Minister Muhammad Khan Junejo's first federal cabinet, Mian was appointed Minister for Culture and Tourism on 21 May 1985. He held the portfolio until 28 January 1986.

The official Cabinet Division record lists Lieutenant General (retired) Jamal Said Mian as Minister for Culture and Tourism during this period.

=== Member of the Senate (1985–1991) ===
Mian was elected to the Senate of Pakistan as an independent member representing the Federally Administered Tribal Areas in March 1985. He served until March 1991.

The book Working with Zia: Pakistan's Power Politics 1977–1988 describes how Mian contested the Senate seat allocated to the Tribal Areas quota. According to the account, Lieutenant General Fazle Haq, then Governor of the North-West Frontier Province, persuaded some candidates to withdraw, after which the remaining candidates from the province and Tribal Areas were elected unopposed.

His membership of the Senate is also reflected in parliamentary records from the period. Senate debates from December 1985 identify him as Lieutenant General (retired) Jamal Said Mian.

=== Minister for Water and Power (1986) ===
On 28 January 1986, Mian was appointed Minister for Water and Power in the second federal cabinet of Prime Minister Muhammad Khan Junejo.

He served in the position until 20 December 1986, when the second Junejo cabinet resigned.

=== Political activity after ministerial service ===
Mian remained politically active after leaving federal ministerial office. In January 2002, he welcomed President General Pervez Musharraf's efforts to provide the people of the tribal areas with representation in the provincial assembly.

In a statement reported by Dawn, Mian argued that people in the tribal areas lacked a traditional political voice in national affairs and did not have the right to appeal. He criticised the political administration in FATA for speaking to local people without adequately listening to them. He welcomed the announcement of representation for the tribal areas in the provincial assembly as a step towards political participation.

== Death ==
Mian died in Islamabad on 15 October 2026.

He was laid to rest with full state honours in his ancestral village of Shakardara. Following his funeral prayers, he was buried beside his father in the presence of civil and military officials, relatives and well-wishers.

On 19 October 2026, the Senate of Pakistan passed a condolence resolution paying tribute to Jamal Said Mian and former senator Taj Muhammad Afridi for their services to democracy. The Senate also offered Fateha and expressed condolences to the bereaved families.

== See also ==
- Pakistan Army
- Senate of Pakistan
- Federally Administered Tribal Areas
- Pakistan Military Academy
