= Sibi railway station =

Railway station in Pakistan

Coordinates: 29.5475°N 67.8699°E

Sibi Junction Station سبی جنکشن ریلوے اسٹیشن

General information
- Owner: Ministry of Railways
- Lines: Rohri-Chaman Railway Line; Kandahar State Railway (Defunct)
- Platforms: 3

Other information
- Station code: SIB

History
- Opened: 1881

Services
Preceding station	Pakistan Railways	Following station
Perak towards Rohri Junction	Rohri–Chaman Line	Mushkaf towards Chaman
Terminus	Kandahar State Railway	Nari towards Zardalu
Location

Sibi Junction railway station (Urdu: سبی جنکشن ریلوے اسٹیشن, Balochi: سبی جنکشن ریلوے اسٹیشن) is located in Sibi, Balochistan, Pakistan. It is staffed and has a booking office. The station served as the junction between the Rohri-Chaman Railway Line and Kandahar State Railway.

== Station layout ==
G	Street level	Exit/Entrance & ticket counter
P1	FOB, Side platform, No-1 doors will open on the left/right
P1	Track 1
P1	Track 2
P1	FOB, Island platform, No- 2 doors will open on the left/right
P1	Island platform, No- 3 doors will open on the left/right
P1	Track 3
Track 4	For freight trains
Track 5	For freight trains

== Services ==
The following trains stop at Sibi Junction station:

Preceding station	Pakistan Railways	Following station
Aab-e-Gum towards Quetta	Akbar Express	Bakhtiarabad Domki towards Lahore Junction
Bakhtiarabad Domki towards Karachi City	Bolan Mail	Aab-e-Gum towards Quetta
Aab-e-Gum towards Quetta	Jaffar Express	Bakhtiarabad Domki towards Peshawar Cantonment

== See also ==
- List of railway stations in Pakistan
- Pakistan Railways
- Quetta Railway Station
- Rawalpindi Railway Station
- Larkana Railway Station
