= Scinde, Punjab & Delhi Railway =

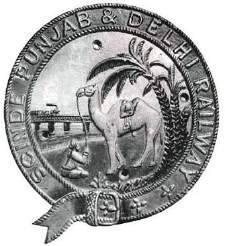
- Industry: Railways
- Predecessor: Scinde Railway (SR); Indus Steam Flotilla (ISF); Punjab Railway (PR); Delhi Railway (DR)
- Founded: 1870; 156 years ago
- Defunct: 1885; 141 years ago
- Successor: North Western State Railway (NWR)
- Headquarters: Karachi, Sind, British Raj
- Area served: Punjab, Sind
- Services: Rail transport

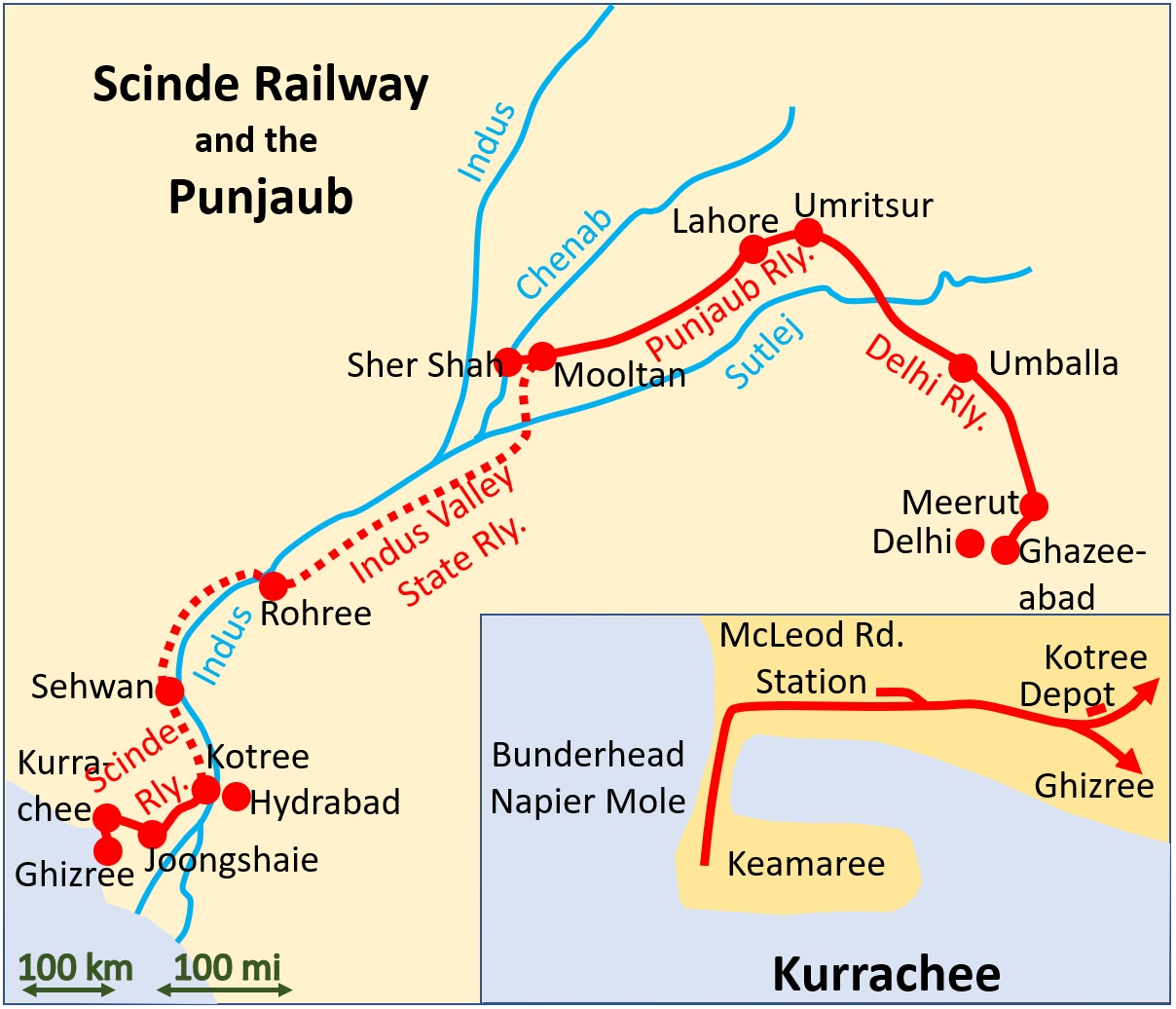
The Scinde, Punjab & Delhi Railway

The Scinde, Punjab, Delhi Railway (reporting mark SP&DR) was formed in 1870 from the incorporation of the Scinde Railway, Indus Steam Flotilla, Punjab Railway and Delhi Railway companies. This was covered by the Scinde Railway Company's Amalgamation Act 1869.

== History ==
The Scinde, Punjab, Delhi Railway inherited the unfortunate reputation as being one of the worst managed private railway companies. Given its reputation in the 1860s and 1870s for discord, shady and inept contractors and financial irregularities, it is surprising that the SP&DR did not pass into public ownership sooner than 31 December 1885. After its purchase, the SP&DR was merged with several other railways to form the North Western State Railway.

- 1855: Scinde Railway formed. After 11 surveys and 18 months the route was approved.
- 1857: Punjab Railway formed.
- 1858: commencement of the Karachi-Kotri section of Scinde Railway.
- 1859: contracts signed to construct Multan-Lahore-Amritsar section and operate the Indus Steam Flotilla, thus linking the Scinde and Punjab Railways together.
- 1861: Karachi-Kotri line of Scinde Railways opens to the public.
- 1862: Amritsar-Attari section completed on the route to Lahore.
- 1863: plans for Delhi-Amritsar section (Delhi Railway).
- 1870: Scinde, Punjab & Delhi Railway (SP&DR) company formed when Scinde Railway, Punjab Railway, the Indus Steam Flotilla and Delhi Railway merge - thus linking Karachi via Multan to Lahore.
- 1886: contracts expired and responsibility for the SP&DR was transferred entirely to the government, which would merge the company into the North Western State Railway.

== Rolling stock ==
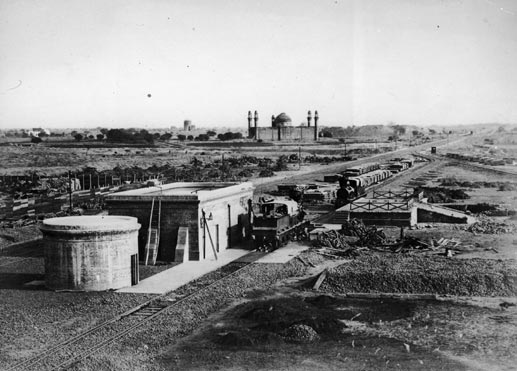
Scinde, Delhi and Punjab Railway, a few miles from Lahore, c. 1880

By the end of 1877 the company owned 151 steam locomotives, 517 coaches and 2969 goods wagons.

== See also ==
- History of rail transport in Pakistan
- Scinde Railway
- Indus Steam Flotilla
- Punjab Railway
- Pakistan Railways

== Notes ==
- The spelling of Scinde, Punjaub & Delhi Railway is variable. Scinde and Punjaub are the spellings adopted in the legislation – see "Government Statute Law Repeals 2012", pages 134–135, paragraphs 3.78–3.83.
