= NA-205 Naushahro Feroze-I =

Constituency of the National Assembly of Pakistan

- Constituency for the National Assembly of Pakistan
- Region: Mehrabpur Tehsil, Bhiria Tehsil (partly) and Kandiaro Tehsil (partly) including Kandiaro town of Naushahro Feroze District
- Electorate: 477,319

Current constituency
- Party: Pakistan People’s Party
- Member: Sayed Abrar Ali Shah
- Created from: NA-212 Naushahro Feroze-II

NA-205 Naushahro Feroze-I (این اے-205، نوشہروفِيروز-1) is a constituency for the National Assembly of Pakistan.

== Assembly Segments ==
| Constituency number | Constituency | District | Current MPA | Party |
|---|---|---|---|---|
| 32 | PS-32 Naushahro Feroze-I | Naushahro Feroze District | Syed Serfraz Hussain Shah | PPP |
| 33 | PS-33 Naushahro Feroze-II | Naushahro Feroze District | Syed Hassan Ali Shah | PPP |

== Election 2002 ==
General elections were held on 10 October 2002. Syed Zafar Ali Shah of PPP won by 76,470 votes.

General election 2002: NA-212 Naushahro Feroze-II
| Party | Candidate | Votes | % | ±% |
|---|---|---|---|---|
| PPP | Allando Shah Alias Zafar Ali Shah | 76,470 | 54.77 | |
| NA | Khalid Akhtar Jatoi | 60,121 | 43.06 | |
| Others | Others (nine candidates) | 3,022 | 2.17 | |
| Turnout | | 142,785 | 43.97 | |
| Total valid votes | | 139,613 | 97.78 | |
| Rejected ballots | | 3,172 | 2.22 | |
| Majority | | 16,349 | 11.71 | |
| Registered electors | | 324,754 | | |

== Election 2008 ==
General elections were held on 18 February 2008. Syed Zafar Ali Shah of PPP won by 98,999 votes.

General election 2008: NA-212 Naushahro Feroze-II
| Party | Candidate | Votes | % | ±% |
|---|---|---|---|---|
| PPP | Syed Zafar Ali Shah | 98,999 | 62.59 | |
| PML(Q) | Syed Murad Ali Shah | 47,286 | 29.90 | |
| Independent | Asghar Ali Shah | 6,401 | 4.05 | |
| Others | Others (six candidates) | 5,477 | 3.46 | |
| Turnout | | 162,093 | 43.05 | |
| Total valid votes | | 158,163 | 97.58 | |
| Rejected ballots | | 3,930 | 2.42 | |
| Majority | | 51,713 | 32.69 | |
| Registered electors | | 376,544 | | |
| PPP hold | | | | |

== Election 2013 ==
General elections were held on 11 May 2013. Asghar Ali Shah of PPP won by 93,884 votes and became the member of National Assembly.

General election 2013: NA-212 Naushahro Feroze-II
| Party | Candidate | Votes | % | ±% |
|---|---|---|---|---|
| PPP | Asghar Ali Shah | 93,884 | 49.46 | |
| NPP | Ghulam Rasool Khan Jatoi | 58,903 | 31.03 | |
| PML(N) | Allando Shah Alias Zafar Ali Shah | 25,978 | 13.68 | |
| Others | Others (twenty one candidates) | 11,071 | 5.83 | |
| Turnout | | 197,365 | 63.22 | |
| Total valid votes | | 189,836 | 96.19 | |
| Rejected ballots | | 7,529 | 3.81 | |
| Majority | | 34,981 | 18.43 | |
| Registered electors | | 312,206 | | |
| PPP hold | | | | |

== Election 2018 ==
General elections were held on 25 July 2018.

General election 2018: NA-211 Naushahro Feroze-I
| Party | Candidate | Votes | % | ±% |
|---|---|---|---|---|
| PPP | Sayed Abrar Ali Shah | 110,967 | 53.58 | |
| GDA | Syed Zafar Ali Shah | 80,544 | 38.89 | |
| PML(N) | Qamarul Zaman Rajpur | 6,278 | 3.03 | |
| TLP | Syed Safdar Ali Shah | 2,015 | 0.97 | |
| PTI | Ghazala Hussain | 1,283 | 0.62 | |
| Independent | Imdad All Channa | 1,261 | 0.61 | |
| Independent | Maqsood Ali Khushik | 928 | 0.45 | |
| MMA | Mehmooda Begum | 763 | 0.37 | |
| Independent | Abdul Sattar Rajper | 624 | 0.30 | |
| Independent | Asghar Ali Shah | 463 | 0.22 | |
| MQM-P | Mir Muhammad Rajput | 363 | 0.18 | |
| Independent | Mumtaz All Chandio | 353 | 0.17 | |
| Independent | Shoukat Ali Arain | 214 | 0.10 | |
| Independent | Abdul Ghaffar Alias Ghullam Murtaza | 201 | 0.10 | |
| Independent | Shahid Ikram | 200 | 0.10 | |
| PSP | Syed Kaleemullah | 159 | 0.08 | |
| Independent | Syed Hassan Ali Shah | 129 | 0.06 | |
| Pakistan Falah Party | Muhammad Ramzan | 88 | 0.04 | |
| Independent | Ameer Bux Rajper | 85 | 0.04 | |
| Independent | Qudsia Qazi | 80 | 0.04 | |
| Independent | Syed Zohaib Ali Shah | 75 | 0.04 | |
| Independent | Khalid Masood Channa | 49 | 0.02 | |
| Turnout | | 215,036 | 55.52 | |
| Total valid votes | | 207,122 | 96.32 | |
| Rejected ballots | | 7,914 | 3.68 | |
| Majority | | 30,423 | 14.69 | |
| Registered electors | | 387,304 | | |
| PPP hold | | | | |

== Election 2024 ==
Elections were held on 8 February 2024. Sayed Abrar Ali Shah won the election with 126,056 votes.

General election 2024: NA-205 Naushahro Feroze-I
| Party | Candidate | Votes | % | ±% |
|---|---|---|---|---|
| PPP | Sayed Abrar Ali Shah | 126,056 | 57.73 | ▲2.35 |
| PML(N) | Asghar Ali Shah | 55,001 | 25.19 | ▲22.16 |
| TLP | Gul Hassan | 26,055 | 11.93 | |
| Others | Others (fifteen candidates) | 11,240 | 5.15 | |
| Turnout | | 221,169 | 46.34 | ▼9.18 |
| Total valid votes | | 218,352 | 98.73 | |
| Rejected ballots | | 2,817 | 1.27 | |
| Majority | | 71,055 | 32.54 | ▲17.85 |
| Registered electors | | 477,319 | | |
| PPP hold | | | | |

== See also ==
- NA-204 Khairpur-III
- NA-206 Naushahro Feroze-II
