= Bahawalpur railway station =

Railway station in Punjab, Pakistan

Bahawalpur Railway Station بہاولپور ریلوے اسٹیشن
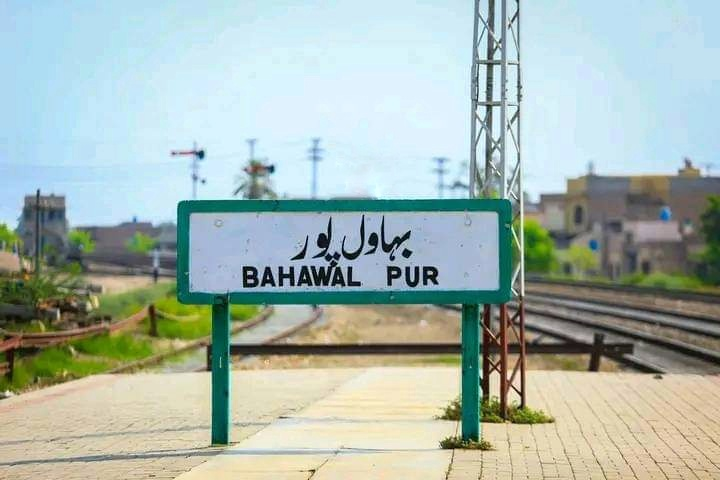

General information
- Coordinates: 29.4030°N 71.6523°E
- Owner: Ministry of Railways
- Line: Karachi–Peshawar Railway Line
- Platforms: 3

Construction
- Structure type: Standard (on ground station)
- Parking: Available
- Accessible: Available

Other information
- Station code: BWPR

History
- Opened: 1878; September 2019 (reconstructed)

Services
Preceding station	Pakistan Railways	Following station
Samasata Junction towards Kiamari	Karachi–Peshawar Line	Admwahan towards Peshawar Cantonment
Location

Bahawalpur Railway Station (Urdu and Punjabi: بہاولپور ریلوے اسٹیشن) is located in Bahawalpur city, Bahawalpur district, Punjab province, Pakistan at an elevation of 117 metres. It is a major railway station of Pakistan Railways on the Karachi-Peshawar main line.

The station is staffed and has advance and current reservation offices. Food stalls are also located on its platforms.

In 2016 the Railways Minister Khawaja Saad Rafique announced that Rs280 million will be spent on the construction of Bahawalpur Model Railway Station. In 2019, the new building was inaugurated by the then railway minister Sheikh Rasheed.

== Train routes ==
The train routes from the station link Bahawalpur to Karachi, Lahore, Rawalpindi, Peshawar, Quetta, Multan, Faisalabad, Sargodha, Sialkot, Gujranwala, Hyderabad, Sukkur, Jhang, Rahim Yar Khan, Nawabshah, Attock, Sibi, Khanewal, Gujrat, Rohri, Jacobabad, and Nowshera.

== Train services from Bahawalpur ==
The following trains serve this station:

Train name	Train code	Stations
Allama Iqbal Express	9 UP, 10 DN	Karachi Cantt, Hyderabad Jn, Nawabshah, Mehrabpur, Rohri Jn, Sadiqabad, Rahim Yar Khan, Khanpur, Bahawalpur, Jehanian, Khanewal Jn, Sahiwal, Okara Cantt, Pattoki, Kot Radha Kishen, Raiwind Jn, Kot Lakhpat, Lahore Jn, Shahdara Bagh, Narang, Baddomalhi, Narowal, Pasrur, Chawinda, Sialkot
Awam Express	13 UP, 14 DN	Karachi Cantt, Landhi, Jungshahi, Jhimpir, Kotri Jn, Hyderabad Jn, Tando Adam, Shahdadpur, Nawabshah, Pad Idan, Bhiria Road, Mehrabpur, Setharja, Ranipur, Gambat, Khairpur, Rohri Jn, Pano Akil, Ghotki, Mirpur Mathelo, Daharki, Sadiqabad, Rahim Yar Khan, Khanpur, Liaquatpur, Dera Nawab Sahib, Samasata Jn, Bahawalpur, Shujabad, Multan Cantt, Khanewal Jn, Chichawatni, Sahiwal, Okara Cantt, Pattoki, Kot Radha Kishan, Raiwand Jn, Kot Lakhpat, Lahore Jn, Gujranwala, Wazirabad Jn, Gujrat, Lala Musa Jn, Kharian Cantt, Jhelum, Gujar Khan, Chak Lala, Rawalpindi, Taxila Jn, Hasan Abdal, Attock Jn, Jehangira Road, Nowshera Jn, Peshawar City, Peshawar Cantt
Hazara Express	11 UP, 12 DN	Karachi City, Karachi Cantt, Drigh Road, Landhi Jn, Kotri Jn, Hyderabad Jn, Tando Adam, Nawabshah, Pad Idan, Bhiria Road, Mehrabpur Jn, Rohri Jn, Pano Akil, Mirpur Mathelo, Sadiqabad, Rahim Yar Khan, Khanpur Jn, Liaquatpur, Dera Nawab Sahib, Samasata Jn, Bahawalpur, Shujabad, Multan Cantt, Riazabad, Khanewal Jn, Shorkot Cantt Jn, Jhang Sadar, Sillanwali, Shaheenabad Jn, Sargodha Jn, Bhalwal, Malakwal Jn, Mandi Bahauddin, Lala Musa Jn, Jhelum, Gujar Khan, Rawalpindi, Taxila Jn, Haripur Hazara, Havelian
Jaffar Express	39 UP, 40 DN	Quetta, Kolpur, Mach, Aab-e-gum, Sibi Jn, Bukhtiarabad Domki, Dera Murad Jamali, Dera Allah Yar, Jacobabad Jn, Shikarpur, Sukkur, Rohri Jn, Sadiqabad, Rahim Yar Khan, Bahawalpur, Multan Cantt, Khanewal Jn, Sahiwal, Okara Cantt, Raiwind Jn, Lahore Jn, Gujranwala, Wazirabad Jn, Gujrat, Lalamusa Jn, Jhelum, Rawalpindi
Khyber Mail	1 UP, 2 DN	Karachi Cantt, Landhi, Hyderabad Jn, Nawabshah, Khairpur, Rohri Jn, Pano Akil, Ghotki, Mirpur Mathelo, Daharki, Sadiqabad, Rahim Yar Khan, Khanpur, Liaquatpur, Dera Nawab Sahib, Samasata Jn, Bahawalpur, Lodhran Jn, Shujabad, Multan Cantt, Khanewal Jn, Mian Channun, Chichawatni, Sahiwal, Okara Cantt, Pattoki, Raiwind Jn, Kot Lakhpat, Lahore Jn, Gujranwala, Wazirabad Jn, Gujrat, Lala Musa Jn, Jhelum, Rawalpindi, Attock city Jn, Jehangira Road, Nowshera, Peshawar City, Peshawar Cantt
Pakistan Express	45 UP, 46 DN	Karachi Cantt, Hyderabad Jn, Rohri Jn, Rahim Yar Khan, Khanpur, Bahawalpur, Multan Cantt, Khanewal Jn, Shorkot Cantt Jn, Toba Tek Singh, Gojra, Faisalabad, Sangla Hill Jn, Hafizabad, Alipur Chatta, Wazirabad Jn, Gujrat, Lala Musa Jn, Jhelum, Rawalpindi
Quetta Express	23 UP, 24 DN	Quetta, Kolpur, Mach, Aab-e-gum, Sibi Jn, Bukhtiarabad Domki, Dera Murad Jamali, Dera Allah Yar, Jacobabad Jn, Shikarpur, Sukkur, Rohri Jn, Pano Akil, Ghotki, Mirpur Mathelo, Sadiqabad, Rahim Yar Khan, Khanpur, Dera Nawab Sahib, Bahawalpur, Khanewal Jn, Shorkot Cantt Jn, Faisalabad, Lahore Jn
Shalimar Express	27 UP, 28 DN	Karachi Cantt, Hyderabad Jn, Mehrabpur Jn, Rohri Jn, Rahim Yar Khan, Bahawalpur, Multan Cantt, Faisalabad, Lahore Jn
Tezgam	7 UP, 8 DN	Karachi Cantt, Hyderabad Jn, Tando Adam, Nawabshah, Khairpur, Rohri Jn, Rahim Yar Khan, Khanpur, Bahawalpur, Multan Cantt, Khanewal Jn, Mian Channu, Chichawatni, Sahiwal, Okara Cantt, Pattoki, Kot Radha Kishan, Raiwind Jn, Kot Lakhpat, Lahore Jn, Gujranwala, Lalamusa Jn, Jhelum, Rawalpindi

== Gallery ==
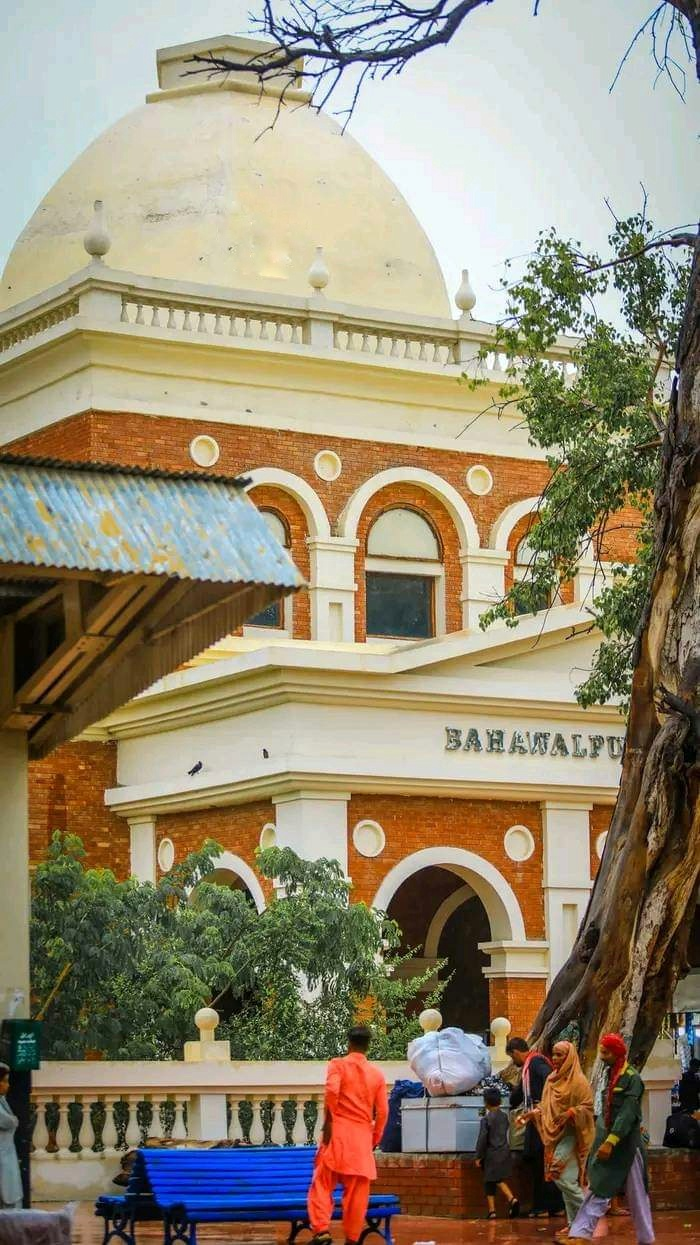

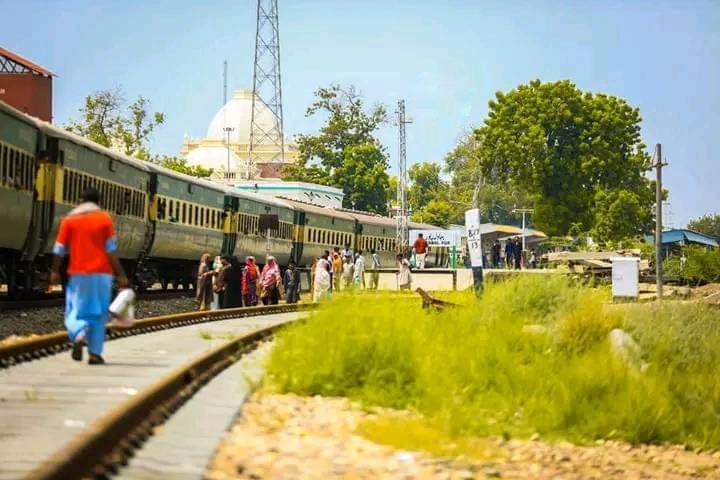

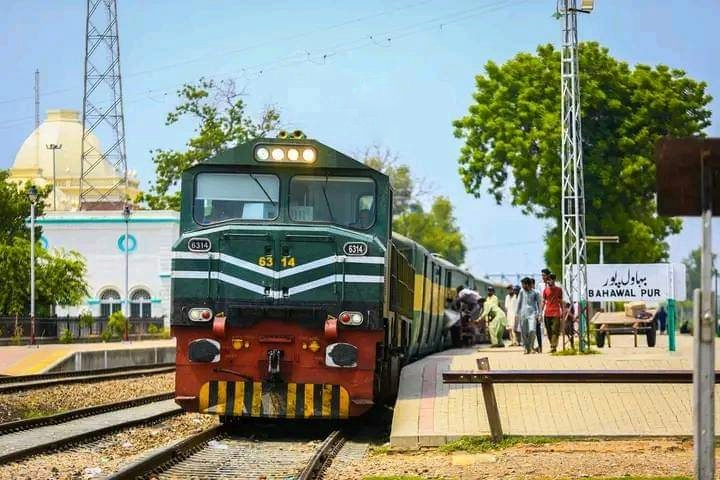

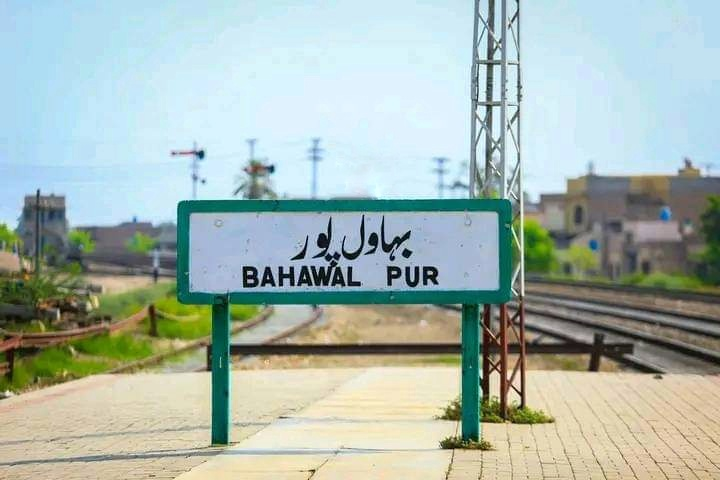

== See also ==
- List of railway stations in Pakistan
- Pakistan Railways
