= Rahim Yar Khan railway station =

Railway station in Punjab province of Pakistan

Rahim Yar Khan Station رحیم یار خان ریلوے اسٹیشن
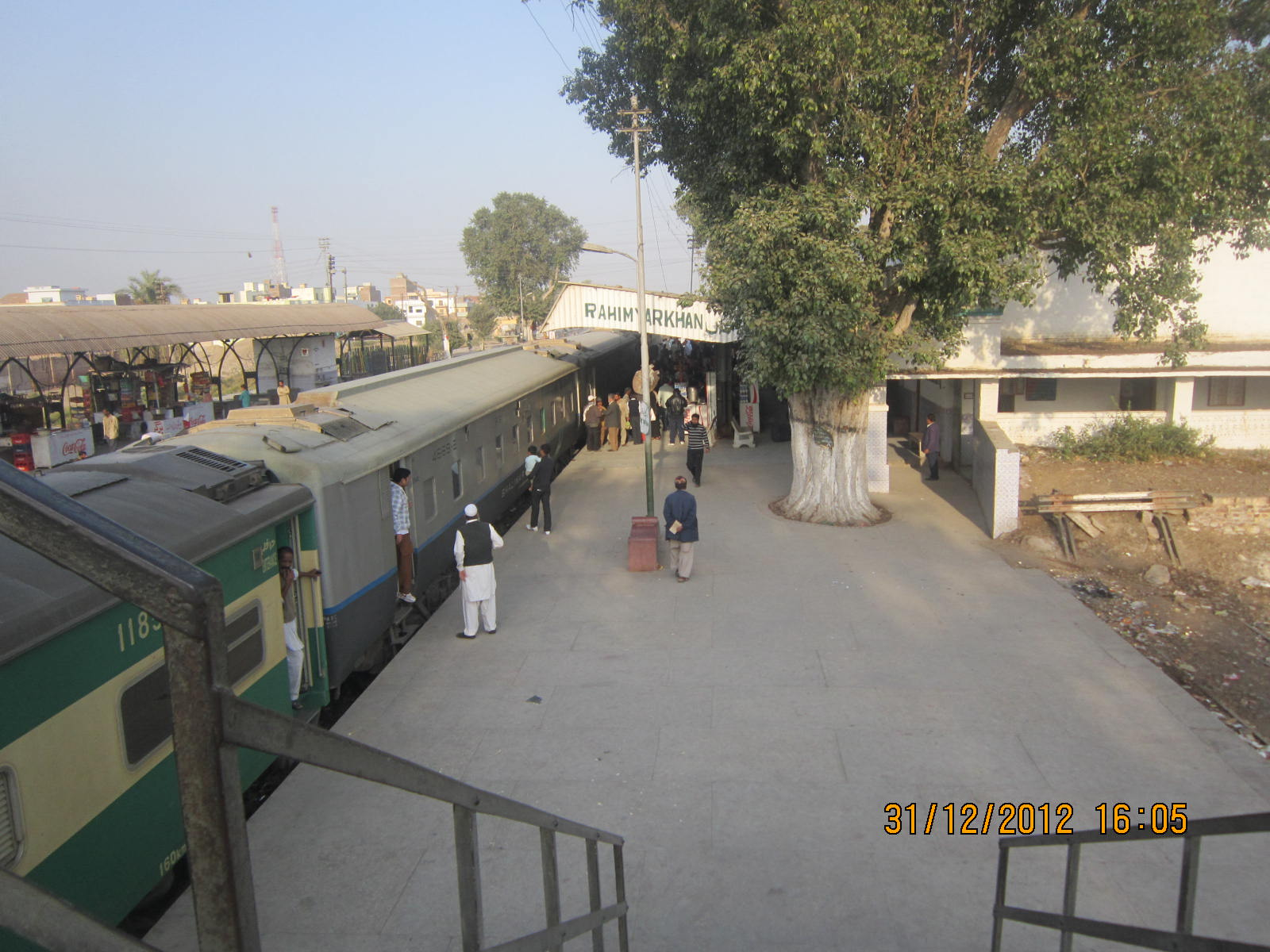

General information
- Coordinates: 28.4227°N 70.3032°E
- Owner: Ministry of Railways
- Line: Karachi–Peshawar Line
- Platforms: 3
- Tracks: 4

Other information
- Station code: RYK

History
- Former names: Nowshera

Services
Preceding station	Pakistan Railways	Following station
Adamshaba towards Kiamari	Karachi–Peshawar Line	Tarinda towards Peshawar Cantonment
Location

Rahim Yar Khan Railway Station (Urdu and Punjabi: رحیم یار خان ریلوے اسٹیشن) is located in Rahim Yar Khan city, Rahim Yar Khan district of Punjab province, Pakistan. It is a major railway station of Pakistan Railways on Karachi–Peshawar Line. The station is staffed and has advance and current reservation offices. Food stalls are also located on its platforms.

== Train routes ==
Rahim Yar Khan is linked to Karachi, Lahore, Rawalpindi, Peshawar, Quetta, Multan, Faisalabad, Sargodha, Sialkot, Gujranwala, Hyderabad, Sukkur, Jhang, Bahawalpur, Nawabshah, Attock, Sibi, Khanewal, Gujrat, Rohri, Jacobabad, and Nowshera.

== Premium Services ==
In 2012 when Pakistan Premium train service Pak Business Express started, It was allowed a stoppage at Rahim Yar Khan railway station, Additionally Premium Services such as Shalimar Express & Jaffer Express also have a stoppage in Rahim Yar Khan.

== Uprooted Sidings ==
There were sidings available for transport of goods in Unilever & Abbasia Mill located across the railway station but later due to closure of Abbasia Mill & Expiry of contract with Unilever Pakistan Railway uprooted these sidings with now only Abandoned rail line remnants.

== Train services from Rahim Yar Khan ==
Train Name	Train Code	Stations
Allama Iqbal Express	9 UP, 10 DN	Karachi Cantt, Hyderabad Jn, Nawabshah, Mehrabpur, Rohri Jn, Sadiqabad, Rahim Yar Khan, Khanpur, Bahawalpur, Jehanian, Khanewal Jn, Sahiwal, Okara Cantt, Pattoki, Kot Radha Kishen, Raiwind Jn, Kot Lakhpat, Lahore Jn, Shahdara Bagh, Narang, Baddomalhi, Narowal, Pasrur, Chawinda, Sialkot
Awam Express	13 UP, 14 DN	Karachi Cantt, Landhi, Jungshahi, Jhimpir, Kotri Jn, Hyderabad Jn, Tando Adam, Shahdadpur, Nawabshah, Pad Idan, Bhiria Road, Mehrabpur, Setharja, Ranipur, Gambat, Khairpur, Rohri Jn, Pano Akil, Ghotki, Mirpur Mathelo, Daharki, Sadiqabad, Rahim Yar Khan, Khanpur, Liaquatpur, Dera Nawab Sahib, Samasata Jn, Bahawalpur, Shujabad, Multan Cantt, Khanewal Jn, Chichawatni, Sahiwal, Okara Cantt, Pattoki, Kot Radha Kishan, Raiwand Jn, Kot Lakhpat, Lahore Jn, Gujranwala, Wazirabad Jn, Gujrat, Lala Musa Jn, Kharian Cantt, Jhelum, Gujar Khan, Chak Lala, Rawalpindi, Taxila Jn, Hasan Abdal, Attock Jn, Jehangira Road, Nowshera Jn, Peshawar City, Peshawar Cantt
Hazara Express	11 UP, 12 DN	Karachi City, Karachi Cantt, Drigh Road, Landhi Jn, Kotri Jn, Hyderabad Jn, Tando Adam, Nawabshah, Pad Idan, Bhiria Road, Mehrabpur Jn, Rohri Jn, Pano Akil, Mirpur Mathelo, Sadiqabad, Rahim Yar Khan, Khanpur Jn, Liaquatpur, Dera Nawab Sahib, Samasata Jn, Bahawalpur, Shujabad, Multan Cantt, Riazabad, Khanewal Jn, Shorkot Cantt Jn, Jhang Sadar, Sillanwali, Shaheenabad Jn, Sargodha Jn, Bhalwal, Malakwal Jn, Mandi Bahauddin, Lala Musa Jn, Jhelum, Gujar Khan, Rawalpindi, Taxila Jn, Haripur Hazara, Havelian
Jaffar Express	39 UP, 40 DN	Quetta, Kolpur, Mach, Aab-e-gum, Sibi Jn, Bukhtiarabad Domki, Dera Murad Jamali, Dera Allah Yar, Jacobabad Jn, Shikarpur, Sukkur, Rohri Jn, Sadiqabad, Rahim Yar Khan, Bahawalpur, Multan Cantt, Khanewal Jn, Sahiwal, Okara Cantt, Raiwind Jn, Lahore Jn, Gujranwala, Wazirabad Jn, Gujrat, Lalamusa Jn, Jhelum, Rawalpindi
Khyber Mail	1 UP, 2 DN	Karachi Cantt, Landhi, Hyderabad Jn, Nawabshah, Khairpur, Rohri Jn, Pano Akil, Ghotki, Mirpur Mathelo, Daharki, Sadiqabad, Rahim Yar Khan. Khanpur, Liaquatpur, Dera Nawab Sahib, Samasata Jn, Bahawalpur, Lodhran Jn, Shujabad, Multan Cantt, Khanewal Jn, Mian Channun, Chichawatni, Sahiwal, Okara Cantt, Pattoki, Raiwind Jn, Kot Lakhpat, Lahore Jn, Gujranwala, Wazirabad Jn, Gujrat, Lala Musa Jn, Jhelum, Rawalpindi, Attock city Jn, Jehangira Road, Nowshera, Peshawar City, Peshawar Cantt
Pakistan Express	45 UP, 46 DN	Karachi Cantt, Hyderabad Jn, Rohri Jn, Rahim Yar Khan, Khanpur, Bahawalpur, Multan Cantt, Khanewal Jn, Shorkot Cantt Jn, Toba Tek Singh, Gojra, Faisalabad, Sangla Hill Jn, * Hafizabad, Alipur Chatta, Wazirabad Jn, Gujrat, Lala Musa Jn, Jhelum, Rawalpindi
Quetta Express	23 UP, 24 DN	Quetta, Kolpur, Mach, Aab-e-gum, Sibi Jn, Bukhtiarabad Domki, Dera Murad Jamali, Dera Allah Yar, Jacobabad Jn, Shikarpur, Sukkur, Rohri Jn, Pano Akil, Ghotki, Mirpur Mathelo, Sadiqabad, Rahim Yar Khan, Khanpur, Dera Nawab Sahib, Bahawalpur, Khanewal Jn, Shorkot Cantt Jn, Faisalabad, Lahore Jn
Shalimar Express	27 UP, 28 DN	Karachi Cantt, Hyderabad Jn, Mehrabpur Jn, Rohri Jn, Rahim Yar Khan, Bhawalpur, Multan Cantt, Faisalabad, Lahore Jn
Tezgam	7 UP, 8 DN	Karachi Cantt, Hyderabad Jn, Tando Adam, Nawabshah, Khairpur, Rohri Jn, Rahim Yar Khan, Khanpur, Bhawalpur, Multan Cantt, Khanewal Jn, Mian Channu, Chichawatni, Sahiwal, Okara Cantt, Pattoki, Kot Radha Kishan, Raiwind Jn, Kot Lakhpat, Lahore Jn, Gujranwala, Lalamusa Jn, Jhelum, Rawalpindi

== See also ==
- List of railway stations in Pakistan
- Pakistan Railways
