= Khan Wahan =

- Village
- Location in Pakistan
- Coordinates: 27°10′20″N 68°17′11″E
- Country: Pakistan
- Region: Sindh Province
- District: Naushahro Feroze
- Taluka: Kandiaro
- Union Council: Khan Wahan
- Time zone: UTC+5 (PST)

Khan Wahan (Urdu: خانواھن), is a village in Kandiaro Taluka of Naushahro Feroze District, Sindh, Pakistan. It is the administrative headquarters of the Khan Wahan Union Council.

== The list of villages in Khan Wahan Union Council ==
1. Shadan khan Mari
2. Tunia Baqa Shah
3. Saeed Khan Khusk
4. Rais Shahnawaz Khan Khushk
5. Juma Khan Dobal
6. Tando Gulshah
7. Madd Koondhar
8. Kouro Khushk
9. Aayal Tunia
10. Ghulam Hyder Siyal
11. Rais Haji Imdad Ali Khushk
