= Sukkur Express =

Pakistani passenger train

Sukkur Express سکر ايڪسپريس
Overview
- Service type: Express
- Current operator: Pakistan Railways
- Website: www.pakrail.gov.pk

Route
- Termini: Karachi City; Jacobabad Jn
- Stops: 20
- Distance travelled: 560 kilometres (350 mi)
- Average journey time: 11 hours and 55 minutes
- Service frequency: Daily
- Train numbers: 145 UP (Karachi -> Jacobabad), 146 DN (Jacobabad -> Karachi)

On-board services
- Classes: Economy, AC Lower and AC Sleeper
- Seating arrangements: Available
- Sleeping arrangements: Available
- Catering facilities: Unavailable
- Baggage facilities: Available

Technical
- Track gauge: Broad gauge
Route map
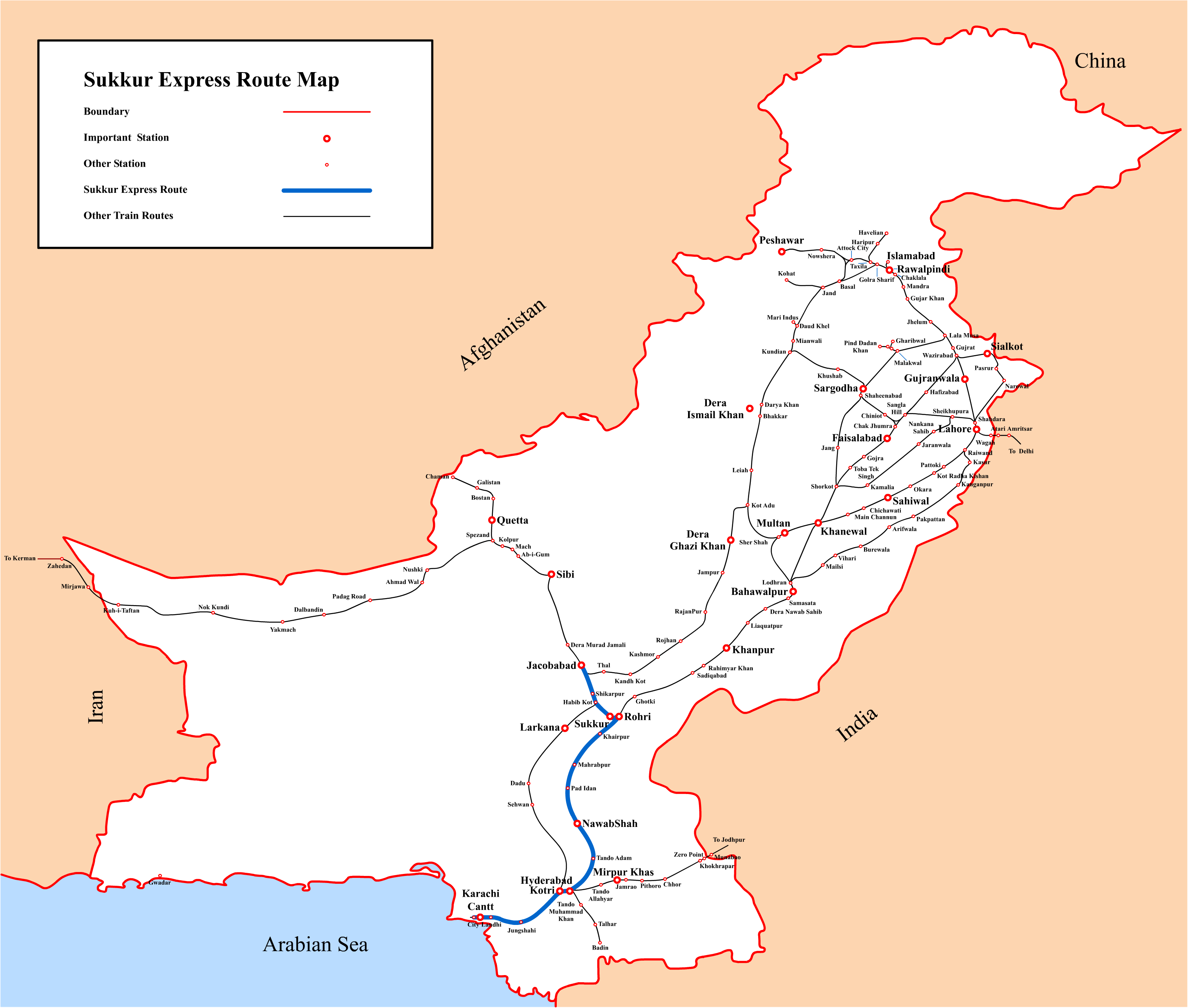
- Sukkur Express route map

Sukkur Express (Sindhi: سکر ايڪسپريس, Urdu: سکھر ایکسپریس) is a daily passenger train service between Karachi and Jacobabad in Pakistan. The train named after Sukkur, a city in Sindh, Pakistan. In beginning it was run between Karachi and Sukkur; later its route was extended to Karachi and Jacobabad.

Sukkur Express has Economy, AC lower and AC Sleeper class accommodation. It covers the 560-kilometre (350 mi) distance from Karachi to Jacobabad in 11 hours and 55 minutes.

== Route ==
Karachi to Jacobabad via Hyderabad and Rohri

== Train stops ==
- Karachi City
- Karachi Cantt
- Drigh Colony
- Landhi
- Kotri Jn
- Hyderabad Jn
- Tando Adam
- Shahdadpur
- Nawabshah
- Kot Lalloo
- Pad Idan
- Bhiria Road
- Lakha Road
- Mehrabpur
- Setharja
- Ranipur Riyasat
- Gambat
- Khairpur
- Rohri Jn
- Sukkur
- Shikarpur
- Jacobabad
