= PS-32 Naushahro Feroze-I =

Constituency of the Provincial Assembly of Sindh, Pakistan

- Constituency for the Provincial Assembly of Sindh
- Region: Kandiaro Tehsil (partly) including Kandiaro town and Mehrabpur tehsil (partly) of Naushahro Feroze District
- Electorate: 227,194

Current constituency
- Member: Vacant
- Created from: PS-20 Naushero Feroze-II & PS-21 Naushahro Feroze-III (2002-2018); PS-33 Naushahro Feroze-I (2018-2023)

PS-32 Naushahro Feroze-I (پی ایس-32، نوشہروفِيروز-1) is a constituency of the Provincial Assembly of Sindh.

== General elections 2024 ==
Provincial election 2024: PS-32 Naushahro Feroze-I
Party	Candidate	Votes	%	±%
PPP	Syed Serfraz Hussain Shah	60,339	59.23	
GDA	Syed Zohaib Ali Shah	28,604	28.08	
Independent	Sindhoo Ghanghro	4,449	4.37	
Independent	Syed Hammad Ullah Shah	2,822	2.77	
PTI	Abdul Wahab Kalhoro (Note: Filed nomination papers as PTI candidate but ECP allowed run as an independent)	1,394	1.37	
Others	Others (fourteen candidates)	4,272	4.18	
Turnout		105,339	46.37	
Total valid votes		101,880	96.72	
Rejected ballots		3,459	3.28	
Majority		31,735	31.15	
Registered electors		227,194		
PPP hold				

== General elections 2018 ==
Provincial election 2018: PS-33 Nausharo Feroze-I
Party	Candidate	Votes	%	±%
PPP	Syed Sarfraz Hussain Shah	52,974	53.72	
GDA	Maqsood Ali Khushik	37,466	37.99	
PML(N)	Syed Aftab Ali Shah	3,299	3.35	
Independent	Syed Abid Ali Shah	1,187	1.20	
MMA	Jamil Ur Rehman Jatoi	888	0.90	
Independent	Imtiaz Hussain	744	0.75	
Independent	Bashir Ahmed Channa	539	0.55	
Independent	Sofia Syed Urf Maqbool Nisa	329	0.33	
PPP(SB)	Rahim Bux Khoso	251	0.25	
Independent	Zohaib Ali	224	0.23	
TLP	Ghulam Mujtaba	193	0.20	
Independent	Ajab Ali Hesbani	99	0.10	
Independent	Ghulam Jan	67	0.07	
SUP	Deedar Ali	54	0.05	
Independent	Syed Zohaib Ali Shah	51	0.05	
PSP	Syed Kaleemullah	48	0.05	
Independent	Asghar Ali Shah	47	0.05	
Independent	Altaf Hussain Sahito	29	0.03	
Independent	Qadir Bux	29	0.03	
Independent	Abdul Ghaffar Alias Ghullam Murtaza	23	0.02	
Independent	Muhram Ali	23	0.02	
Independent	Syed Asbab Ali shah	18	0.02	
Independent	Gulshad	15	0.02	
Independent	Mazhar Ali Abbassi	14	0.01	
Independent	Akbar Ali Qazi	6	0.01	
Majority		15,508	15.73	
Valid ballots		98,617		
Rejected ballots		4,188		
Turnout		102,805		
Registered electors		180,686		
hold				

== General elections 2013 ==
Contesting candidates	Party affiliation	Votes polled

== General elections 2008 ==
Contesting candidates	Party affiliation	Votes polled

== See also ==
- PS-31 Khairpur-VI
- PS-33 Naushahro Feroze-II
