= Miranpur, Sindh =

Miranpur Sindh ميرانپور
- Village
- Motto: "A Great Community"
- Location of Miranpur
- Coordinates: 26°43′58″N 68°16′12″E
- Country: Pakistan
- Province: Sindh Province
- District: Naushahro Feroze
- Tehsil: Naushahro Feroze
- Union Council: Miranpur

Area
  - Total: 5.00 km^{2} (1.93 sq mi)
  - Land: 5.00 km^{2} (1.93 sq mi)
  - Water: 0 km^{2} (0 sq mi)
- Elevation: 13 m (44 ft)

Population (2017)
  - Total: 3,000
  - Estimate: 3,000
- Time zone: UTC+5 (PST)
- ZIP code: 67331
- Area code: 0244

Miranpur is a village in Naushahro Feroze, Sindh, Pakistan. The population was 3000 at the 2017 census.

The Miranpur (Sindhi: ميرانپور) a Palh community village and Deh of Union Council Miranpur of Naushahro Feroze District in the Pakistan Province of Sindh. It is a large village of Naushahro Feroze District. This village has basic facilities of rural areas with Basic Health Unit, High School, Primary School. and Post Office.

== History ==
Founded in 1932, the village changed its name to Miranpur in 1936, when many of the settlers came from their surrounded lands.

== Geography ==
Miranpur is located at (68.2698333, 26.7326667).

== Religion ==
Miranpur is predominantly Muslim, Sunni Bravli and Sunni Deobandi.

== List of cities near the village ==
- Padidan
- Naushahro Feroze
- Darya Khan Mari
- Bhiria Road
