= Juma Khan Dobal =

- Village
- Location in Pakistan
- Coordinates: 27°10′20″N 68°15′11″E
- Country: Pakistan
- Region: Sindh Province
- District: Naushahro Feroze
- Taluka: Kandiaro
- Union Council: Khan Wahan
- Time zone: UTC+5 (PST)

Juma Khan Dobal (Urdu: جمعہ خان ڈوبل), is a village in Kandiaro Taluka of Naushahro Feroze District, Sindh, Pakistan.
