= Sayed Abrar Ali Shah =

Pakistani politician

- سید ابرار علی شاہ

Member of the National Assembly of Pakistan
- Incumbent
- Assumed office 29 February 2024
- Constituency: NA-205 Naushahro Feroze-I
- In office 13 August 2018 – 10 August 2023
- Constituency: NA-211 (Naushahro Feroze-I)

Personal details
- Party: PPP (2018-present)

Sayed Abrar Ali Shah is a Pakistani politician who has been a member of the National Assembly of Pakistan since February 2024 and previously served in this position from August 2018 till August 2023.

== Political career ==
He was elected to the National Assembly of Pakistan from NA-211 (Naushahro Feroze-I) as a candidate of Pakistan Peoples Party (PPP) in the 2018 Pakistani general election. He received 110,967 votes and defeated Syed Zafar Ali Shah, a candidate of the Grand Democratic Alliance (GDA).

He was re-elected to the National Assembly from NA-205 Naushahro Feroze-I as a candidate of PPP in the 2024 Pakistani general election. He received 126,056 votes and defeated Asghar Ali Shah, a candidate of Pakistan Muslim League (N) (PML(N)).
