= Aayal Tunia =

Village in Sindh Province, Pakistan

Ayal Tunia
- Village
- Location in Pakistan
- Coordinates: 27°9′8″N 68°17′47″E
- Country: Pakistan
- Region: Sindh Province
- District: Naushahro Feroze
- Taluka: Kandiaro
- Union Council: Khan Wahan
- Time zone: UTC+5 (PST)

Ayal Tunia (Urdu: آیل تنیہ) is a village in Kandiaro Taluka of Naushahro Feroze District, in the Sindh province, Pakistan.
