= Saeed Khan Khusk =

- Village
- Location in Pakistan
- Coordinates: 27°11′39″N 68°15′31″E
- Country: Pakistan
- Region: Sindh Province
- District: Naushahro Feroze
- Taluka: Kandiaro
- Union Council: Khan Wahan
- Time zone: UTC+5 (PST)

Saeed Khan Khusk (Urdu: سعید خان خشک), is a village in Kandiaro Taluka of Naushahro Feroze District, Sindh, Pakistan.
