= Mohabat Dero Jatoi =

Mohabat Dero
- Town (Union Council)
- Country: Pakistan
- Region: Sindh Province
- District: Naushahro Feroze
- Taluka: Kandiaro
- Union Council: Mohabat Dero

Government
  - Ex MLA: Sardar Haji Ghullam Nabi Khan Dahraj

Population
  - Total: 25,000
- Time zone: UTC+5 (PST)
- Area code: +92242

Mohabat Dero Jatoi (Urdu: محبت ڈیرو جتوئی), is a town in Kandiaro Taluka of Naushahro Feroze District, Sindh, Pakistan. It is also the administrative headquarter of the Mohabat Dero Union Council.
