= Bhiria Tehsil =

City in Sindh, Pakistan

Bhiria City (Tehsil) is an administrative subdivision of Naushahro Feroze District in the province of Sindh, Pakistan. The tehsil is subdivided into Union Councils and is headquartered at the city of Bhiria City.

== Bhiria ==
Bhiria is administratively further divided into following:

- Bhiria
- Bhiria Road
- Lakha Road
- Padidan
