= PS-33 Naushahro Feroze-II =

Constituency of the Provincial Assembly of Sindh, Pakistan

- Constituency for the Provincial Assembly of Sindh
- Region: Mehrabpur tehsil (partly) including Mehrabpur town and Bhiria Tehsil (partly) of Naushahro Feroze District
- Electorate: 250,125

Current constituency
- Member: Vacant
- Created from: PS-20 Naushero Feroze-II & PS-22 Naushero Feroze-IV (2002-2018); PS-34 Naushahro Feroze-II (2018-2023)

PS-33 Naushahro Feroze-II (پی ایس-33، نوشہروفِيروز-2) is a constituency of the Provincial Assembly of Sindh.

== General elections 2024 ==
Provincial election 2024: PS-33 Naushahro Feroze-II
Party	Candidate	Votes	%	±%
PPP	Syed Hassan Ali Shah	61,926	54.64	
GDA	Shakeel Ahmed Jalbani	28,419	25.08	
Independent	Gul Hassan	16,450	14.51	
PTI	Rizwan Ahmed (Note: Filed nomination papers as PTI candidate but ECP allowed him to run as an Independent)	2,747	2.42	
Others	Others (twenty one candidates)	3,794	3.35	
Turnout		117,286	46.89	
Total valid votes		113,336	96.63	
Rejected ballots		3,950	3.37	
Majority		33,507	29.56	
Registered electors		250,125		
PPP hold				

== General elections 2018 ==
Provincial election 2018: PS-34 Nausharo Feroze-II
Party	Candidate	Votes	%	±%
PPP	Syed Murad Ali Shah	51,476	47.72	
GDA	Abdul Sattar Rajper	32,451	30.08	
Independent	Ghous Bux Chang	16,256	15.07	
PML(N)	Fayaz Hussain Lakho	2,309	2.14	
Independent	Sabir Hussain	2,303	2.13	
Independent	Shakil Ahmed Jalbani	534	0.50	
PTI	Ghazala Hussain	532	0.49	
Independent	Imdad Ali Channa	407	0.38	
Independent	Ghulam Murtaza Khan Jatoi	243	0.23	
Independent	Syed Ahtesham Ali Shah	234	0.22	
MQM-P	Sajjad Hussain	212	0.20	
Independent	Abdul Ghaffar	180	0.17	
Independent	Khalid Naeem	164	0.15	
Independent	Nabi Bux Lakho	156	0.14	
Independent	Zafar Ali Rajpar	150	0.14	
Independent	Allando Shah Alias Zafar Ali Shah	117	0.11	
Independent	Syed Zaheer Hussain Shah	73	0.07	
Independent	Asghar Ali Shah	45	0.04	
Independent	Syed Hassan Ali Shah	39	0.04	
Majority		19,025	17.64	
Valid ballots		107,881		
Rejected ballots		4,545		
Turnout		112,426		
Registered electors		206,618		
hold				

== General elections 2013 ==
Contesting candidates	Party affiliation	Votes polled

== General elections 2008 ==
Contesting candidates	Party affiliation	Votes polled

== See also ==
- PS-32 Naushahro Feroze-I
- PS-34 Naushahro Feroze-III
