= Palh =

Sindhi Sammat tribe

پلهہ

Regions with significant populations
- Pakistan, India

Languages
- Sindhi

Religion
- Islam • Hinduism

Related ethnic groups
- Samma • Sindhi

The Pal, Paluh, or Palh (Sindhi: پلهہ) is a Sindhi Sammat tribe of Sindh province, Pakistan, in parts of Punjab bordering Sindh, also in Balochistan province, and also found in the Rajasthan of India. There is a railway station in Sindh, Hyderabad Badin line named after the name of Palh, Palh railway station.

== Distribution ==
Most of this tribe live mainly in the Miranpur, Sindh, Padidan and Dariya Khan Marri areas of Naushahro Feroze District, Village Palh, and Dadu areas of Dadu District, Jam Sahib in Shaheed Benazirabad district, Ranipur, Sindh, Kunmb, Kandari, Village Tarki Turail and Palh village in Khairpur District. However some families are settled in the cities of Larkana, Sukkur, Hyderabad, Karachi, Multan, Quetta and Islamabad The total population of Palh tribe is around 23,000. There are some villages by the name of Palh in Badin, Dadu, Khairpur, and in Sukkur Districts.

The head of this tribe is called Sardar and current head of Palh tribe is Sikander Arbab Palh.
