= Rais Shahnawaz Khan Khushk =

Sardar Shahnawaz Khan Khushk
- Village
- Location in Pakistan
- Coordinates: 27°11′20″N 68°24′11″E
- Country: Pakistan
- Region: Sindh Province
- District: Naushahro Feroze
- Taluka: Kandiaro
- Union Council: Khan Wahan
- Time zone: UTC+5 (PST)

Sardar Shahnawaz Khan Khushk (Urdu: سردار شاھنواز خان خشک), is a Pakistani politician and a Tribal Chief. A village in Kandiaro Taluka of Naushahro Feroze District is after his name being Chief of Khushk Tribe in the area.
