= Adam Sahaba railway station =

Railway station in Punjab, Pakistan

Adam Sahaba Railway Station آدم صحابہ ریلوے اسٹیشن

General information
- Coordinates: 28.3599°N 70.2243°E
- Owner: Ministry of Railways
- Line: Karachi–Peshawar Railway Line

Other information
- Station code: ASA

Services
Preceding station	Pakistan Railways	Following station
Sadiqabad towards Kiamari	Karachi–Peshawar Line	Rahim Yar Khan towards Peshawar Cantonment
Location

Adam Sahaba Railway Station (Urdu and Punjabi: آدم صحابہ ریلوے اسٹیشن ) is located in Adam Sahaba town, in the Rahim Yar Khan district of Punjab, a province of Pakistan.

== See also ==
- List of railway stations in Pakistan
- Pakistan Railways
