= Tunia =

Tunia may refer to:

- Tunia language, an Adamawa language of Chad
- Tunia River, a river of Colombia
- Tunia railway station, West Singhbhum district, Jharkhand, India

== See also ==
- Tunia Baqa Shah, a village in Naushahro Feroze District, Sindh, Pakistan
