= Naushahro Feroze railway station =

Railway station in Sindh, Pakistan

Coordinates: 26.843562448447912°N 68.12825384044656°E

Naushahro Feroze railway station نوشهرو فيروز ريلوي اسٽيشن

General information
- Owner: Ministry of Railways

Other information
- Station code: NSFZ

History
- Former names: Great Indian Peninsula Railway
Location

Naushahro Feroze railway station (Urdu: نوشہرو فیروز ریلوے اسٹیشن, Sindhi: نوشهروفيروز ريلوي اسٽيشن) was located in Naushehro Feroz, Sindh, Pakistan. It was functional until the 1980's after which it was used by the CIA.

== See also ==
- List of railway stations in Pakistan
- Pakistan Railways
