= Machur =

Machur مچر
- Village
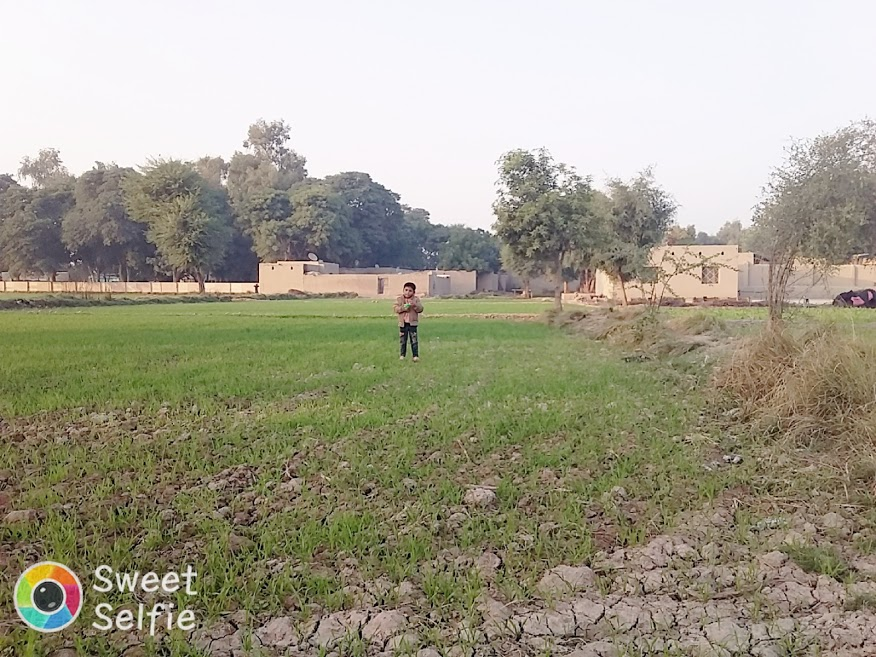
- Machur from back side of RHC Centre in 2017

- Location in Sindh, Pakistan Machur (Pakistan)
- Country: Pakistan
- Province: Sindh
- District: Naushahro Feroze

Population
  - Total: Over 10,000
- Time zone: UTC+5 (PST)

Machur مچر is a village in Naushahro Feroze District, Sindh, Pakistan. It is one of the relatively developed villages in district Naushahro Feroze. This village has all basic facilities of rural areas with Rural Health Center. Village Machur have more than 10 thousand population, Nowadays it is considered as town, in Village Machur there are five Governmental schools, High school Machur for boys, Girls high school, Primary man school, Masjid school Bolani mohalla and girls primary school. High School and Girls' school.
