= Nasrullah Rahu =

Village in Sindh, Pakistan

Nasrullah Rahu is a village in Naushahro Feroze District in the province of Sindh, Pakistan.
