= Asghar Ali Shah =

Asghar Ali Shah may refer to:

- Asghar Ali Shah (boxer) (born 1978) Pakistani boxer
- Asghar Ali Shah (politician) (born 1938) Pakistani politician
