= Sadiqabad railway accident =

2019 train collision in Pakistan

Sadiqabad rail accident
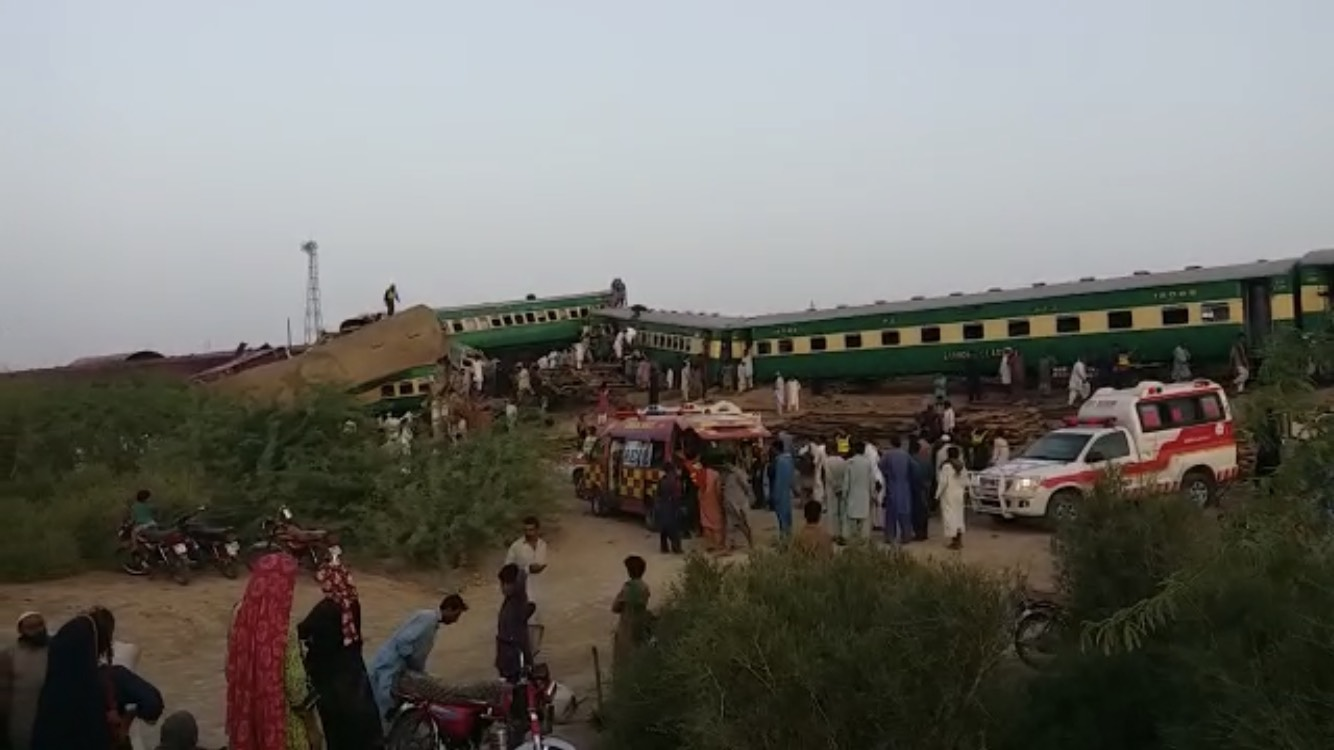

- Location within Pakistan

Details
- Date: 11 July 2019; 4:30 am
- Location: Walhar railway station, Rahim Yar Khan, Punjab
- Coordinates: 28.2015°N 69.9906°E
- Country: Pakistan

Statistics
- Trains: 2
- Deaths: 24

The Sadiqabad railway accident occurred on 11 July 2019 in Rahim Yar Khan District, Punjab, Pakistan. The Quetta-bound Akbar Express collided with a cargo rake at Walhar railway station (parked at the passing loop), due to improper handling of the track switching mechanism. The accident took place around 4:30 a.m. (Pakistan Standard Time), about 35 kilometres (22 mi) south of the district headquarters of Rahim Yar Khan and the train engines were completely destroyed.

Relief operations were launched immediately and a medical emergency was declared at nearby hospitals. An inquiry has been ordered and proportionate compensation for the victims were announced by the railway ministry. Whilst the unaffected coaches of the train left for its destination, regular traffic along the stretch of ML1 route was suspended.

President Arif Alvi, Prime Minister Imran Khan and other political leaders offered their condolences; the opposition noted such accidents to be a recurring event in the recent past and sought for the resignation of the incumbent Rail Minister Sheikh Rasheed Ahmad.

Twenty-four passengers were killed.
