= MGQ =

MGQ or mgq may refer to:

- MGQ, the IATA code for Aden Adde International Airport, Mogadishu, Somalia
- MGQ, the Ministry of Railways station code for Machi Goth railway station, Punjab Province, Pakistan
- mgq, the ISO 639-3 code for Malila language, Tanzania
- Máire Geoghegan-Quinn, Irish politician
