= Tando Gulshah =

- Village
- Location in Pakistan
- Coordinates: 27°10′32″N 68°15′47″E
- Country: Pakistan
- Region: Sindh Province
- District: Naushahro Feroze District
- Taluka: Kandiaro
- Time zone: UTC+5 (PST)

Tando Gulshah (Urdu: ٹنڈو گلشاھ), is a village in the Naushahro Feroze District, of Sindh, Pakistan.
