= Syed Murad Ali Shah (Naushahro Feroze politician) =

Pakistani politician

- سيد مراد علي شاھ

Member of the Provincial Assembly of Sindh
- In office 13 August 2018 – 11 August 2023
- Constituency: PS-34 Naushahro Feroze-II
- In office 29 May 2013 – 28 May 2018

Personal details
- Born: 24 July 1938 (age 87) Naushahro Feroze District
- Party: Pakistan Peoples Party

Syed Murad Ali Shah (Sindhi: سيد مراد علي شاھ) is a Pakistani politician who was a Member of the Provincial Assembly of Sindh, from August 2018 to August 2023 and from May 2013 to May 2018.

== Early life and education ==
He was born on 24 July 1938 in Naushahro Feroze District.

He has a degree of Bachelor of Arts from Sindh University.

== Political career ==
He was elected to the Provincial Assembly of Sindh as a candidate of Pakistan Peoples Party (PPP) from Constituency PS-20 NAUSHERO FEROZE-II in the 2013 Pakistani general election.

He was re-elected to Provincial Assembly of Sindh as a candidate of PPP from Constituency PS-34 (Naushahro Feroze-II) in the 2018 Pakistani general election.
