= Naushahro Feroze Tehsil =

Pakistani administrative area

Naushahro Feroze نوشھروفيروز
- Taluka
- Naushahro Feroze Taluka تعلقو نوشھروفيروز
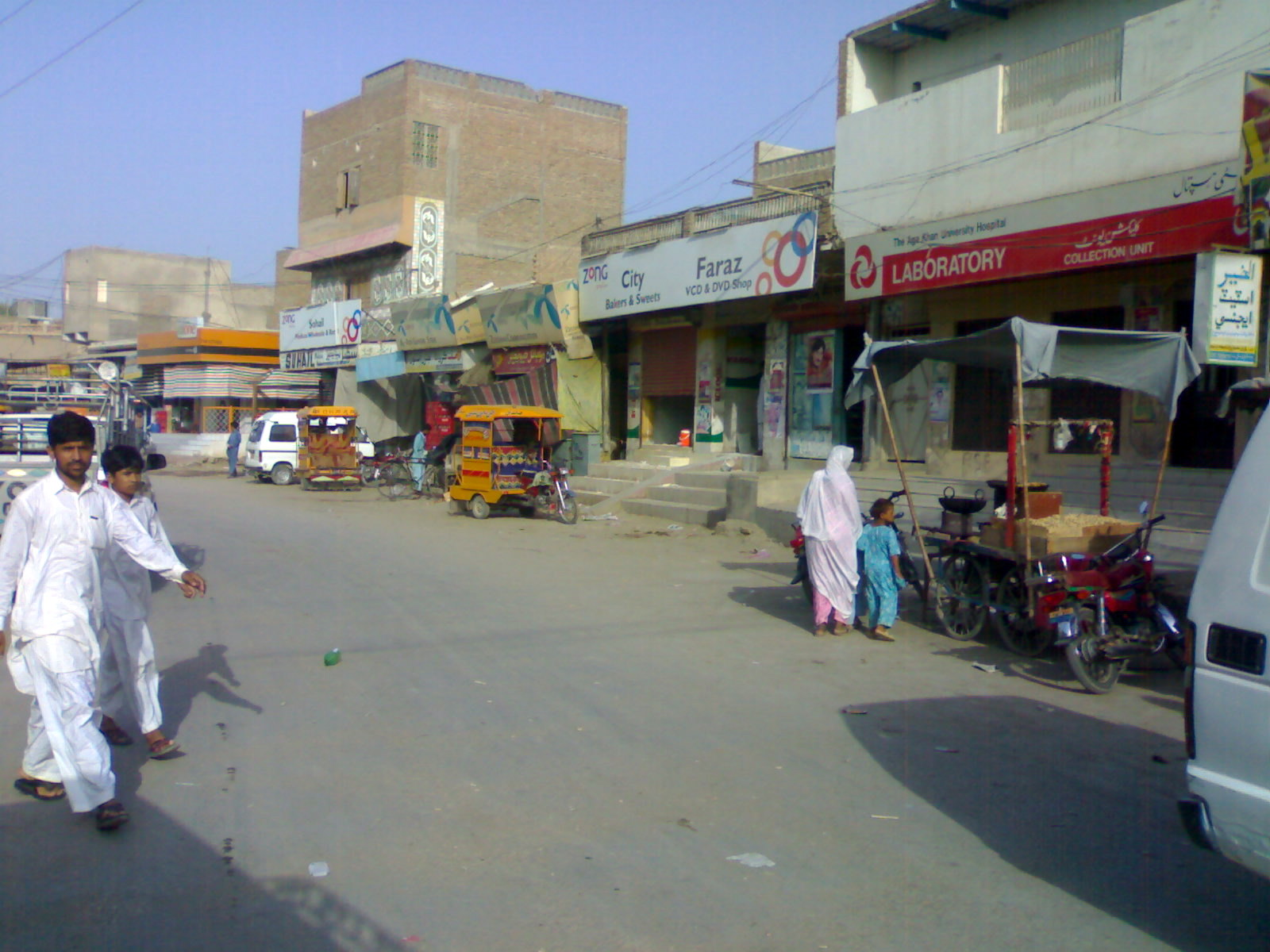
- Street view of Naushahro Feroze city within the taluka, 2009

- Location within Sindh Location within Pakistan
- Coordinates: 26°53′26″N 68°07′29″E
- Country: Pakistan
- Province: Sindh
- District: Naushahro Feroze
- Seat of government: Naushahro Feroze

Area
  - Total: 717 km^{2} (277 sq mi)

Population (2017)
  - Total: 372,899
  - Density: 520/km^{2} (1,350/sq mi)

Naushahro Feroze (Sindhi: نوشھروفيروز تعلقو) is a taluka within Naushahro Feroze District, located in the Shaheed Benazirabad Division of Sindh, Pakistan. The administrative headquarter is located in the eponymous town. According to the 2017 census, the taluka has a population of 372,899.

== Administrative divisions ==
There are a total of 58 dehs (villages) under the taluka:

#	Deh	#	Deh	#	Deh	#	Deh
1	Abji	2	Agham	3	Arban	4	Batil
5	Bhanbhri	6	Bhurnd	7	Bookar	8	Chanari
9	Changal	10	Cheeho	11	Dall	12	Danheja
13	Dhori Bachal	14	Gejh 1	15	Gejh 2	16	Ghanghro
17	Izzat Waggan	18	Jarri	19	Jiskani	20	Kajhar
21	Kalooro	22	Kalro	23	Kanghal	24	Keti Abu Bakar 1
25	Keti Abu Bakar 2	26	Khariro	27	Khuhawar 1	28	Khuhawar 2
29	Khuhi Jalal	30	Koor Gahno	31	Koor Hassan	32	Loothi
33	Masur Ji Wai	34	Menghlo	35	Miranpur	36	Mithiani 1
37	Mithiani 2	38	Mubejani	39	Nathar Detha	40	Naushahro
41	Noor Pur	42	Paddidan	43	Panjo	44	Parya
45	Phull	46	Pir Parto	47	Sahib Khan	48	Seengarchi
49	Serhal	50	Sher Khan	51	Shuja Muhammad	52	Tetri
53	Thatt 1	54	Thatt 2	55	Veesar	56	Wagan
57	Wassan	58	Wassayo				
