= Asghar Ali Shah (politician) =

Pakistani politician

Member of the National Assembly of Pakistan
- In office 1 June 2013 – 31 May 2018
- Constituency: NA-212 (Naushero Feroze-II)

Personal details
- Born: August 29, 1938 (age 87)
- Other political affiliations: Pakistan Peoples Party

Asghar Ali Shah (Urdu: اصغر علی شاہ; born 29 August 1938) is a Pakistani politician who had been a member of the National Assembly of Pakistan from June 2013 to May 2018.

== Early life ==
He was born on 29 August 1938.

== Political career ==
He ran for the seat of the National Assembly of Pakistan as an independent candidate from Constituency NA-212 (Naushero Feroze-II) in the 2008 Pakistani general election but was unsuccessful. He received 6,401 votes and lost the seat to Syed Zafar Ali Shah. In the same election, he ran for the seat of the Provincial Assembly of Sindh as an independent candidate from Constituency PS-20 (Naushero Feroze-II) but was unsuccessful. He received 6,920 votes and lost the seat to Abdul Haque, a candidate of Pakistan Peoples Party (PPP).

He was elected to the National Assembly as a candidate of PPP from Constituency NA-212 (Naushero Feroze-II) in the 2013 Pakistani general election. He received 93,884 votes and defeated Ghulam Rasool Khan Jatoi. In the same election, he ran for the seat of the Provincial Assembly of Sindh as an independent candidate from Constituency PS-20 (Naushero Feroze-II) but was unsuccessful. He received 135 votes and lost the seat to Syed Murad Ali Shah.
