= Reti railway station =

Railway station in Pakistan

Reti Railway Station رتی ریلوے اسٹیشن رتي ريلوي اسٽيشن

General information
- Coordinates: 28.0851°N 69.8569°E
- Owner: Ministry of Railways
- Line: Karachi–Peshawar Railway Line

Other information
- Station code: RTE

Services
Preceding station	Pakistan Railways	Following station
Daharki towards Kiamari	Karachi–Peshawar Line	Shaheed Haider Ali towards Peshawar Cantonment
Location

Reti Railway Station (Urdu and Sindhi: رتی ریلوے اسٹیشن, Sindhi: رتي ريلوي اسٽيشن) is located in Reti village, Ghotki district of Sindh province of the Pakistan. On up-side track of Pakistan Railways, Reti is the last railway station of the Sindh Province. While on the down track, it is the first railway station of Sindh.

== See also ==
- List of railway stations in Pakistan
- Pakistan Railways
