= Sahja railway station =

Railway station in Punjab, Pakistan

Sahja Railway Station سہجہ ریلوے اسٹیشن

General information
- Coordinates: 28.5888°N 70.5623°E
- Owner: Ministry of Railways
- Line: Karachi–Peshawar Railway Line

Other information
- Station code: SJH

Services
Preceding station	Pakistan Railways	Following station
Kotsamaba towards Kiamari	Karachi–Peshawar Line	Khanpur Junction towards Peshawar Cantonment
Location

Sahja Railway Station is located in Sahja, union council of Tehsil Khanpur, Rahim Yar Khan district, Punjab province, Pakistan.

== See also ==
- List of railway stations in Pakistan
- Pakistan Railways
