= Haji Khan Larik =

Haji Khan Larik (1895-unknown) was an Indian Muslim activist and freedom fighter.

== Early life ==
Larik was born in Moulehdino Larik, a village in Naushahro Feroze, Sindh, Pakistan. His secondary education came at Naushahro Madrasa 1909, where he was awarded the Principal's Medal. He joined the Sindh Madrasatul Islam, in Karachi in the year 1913 and passed the Matriculation and school final examination in 1914.

Larik joined F. Y. Arts at Bahauddin College, Junagadh in 1915 and passed the intermediate arts examination in 1917 with mathematics as his elective subject. In the intermediate class he won an essay prize open to a class of 80 students. He received his Bachelor of Arts, 2nd class with honors in English in 1919.

== Career ==
While living in Junagadh he served as President of the Sindh Muslim Association. Larik became Mukhtiarkar (Tehsildar), for three years. He joined the legal profession in 1923, focusing on civil and criminal practice in Mehar Taluka in the Larkana and Dadu districts. He was offered and declined a knighthood by the British.

He was a member of the District Local Board in Dadu during 1937 to 1938. Due to Larik's work, the Dadu District's local board nominated him to a seat on the Sindh Madressah board. Larik was elected to be vice-chairman of the Dadu District School Board due to his interest in Muslim education. He was also a member of the All-India Muslim League. He also was a freedom fighter.
