= Tarinda railway station =

Railway station in Punjab, Pakistan

Tarinda Railway Station ترنڈہ ریلوے اسٹیشن

General information
- Coordinates: 28.4862°N 70.4020°E
- Owner: Ministry of Railways
- Line: Karachi–Peshawar Railway Line

Other information
- Station code: TRD

Services
Preceding station	Pakistan Railways	Following station
Rahim Yar Khan towards Kiamari	Karachi–Peshawar Line	Kotsamaba towards Peshawar Cantonment
Location

Tarinda Railway Station (Urdu and Punjabi: ترنڈہ ریلوے اسٹیشن) is located in Tarinda village, Rahim Yar Khan district of Punjab province of the Pakistan.

== See also ==
- List of railway stations in Pakistan
- Pakistan Railways
