= Tunia Baqa Shah =

Pakistani village

- Village
- Location in Pakistan
- Coordinates: 27°9′20″N 68°16′11″E
- Country: Pakistan
- Region: Sindh Province
- District: Naushahro Feroze District
- Taluka: Kandiaro
- Time zone: UTC+5 (PST)

Tunia Baqa Shah (Urdu: تنیہ بقاشاھ), is a village in the Naushahro Feroze District, of Sindh, Pakistan. It is located at about 16 km northeast of Kandiaro and 9 km northwest of Halani.

== Castes ==
The people of the village belong to various castes and baradari systems. However, the majority of people living in the village are Sindhi speaking. Punjabi is only spoken by the Malak baradari. The Malak baradari had settled to Tunia Baqa Shah during the independence of Pakistan in 1947 when Hindus moved to cities or migrated to India. Before the independence, Hindus were settled in large numbers in the village. Following are the major baradaris of the village.

- Syed
- Tunia
- Jokhia
- Hajjam (Mangi)
- Mochi (Chana)
- Khatti (Soomra)
- Dakhan
- Malik
- Ranghar
- Noohpota

== Village economy ==
Agriculture is the main source of income for the village people. The land around the village is very fertile. Wheat and cotton are the two major crops. However, rice, sugarcane, and other seasonal crops are also grown to run the wheel of the village economy. Farmers usually sell their agricultural products to local brokers and traders who work as intermediaries and make their profits by selling to the markets in bulk quantities.

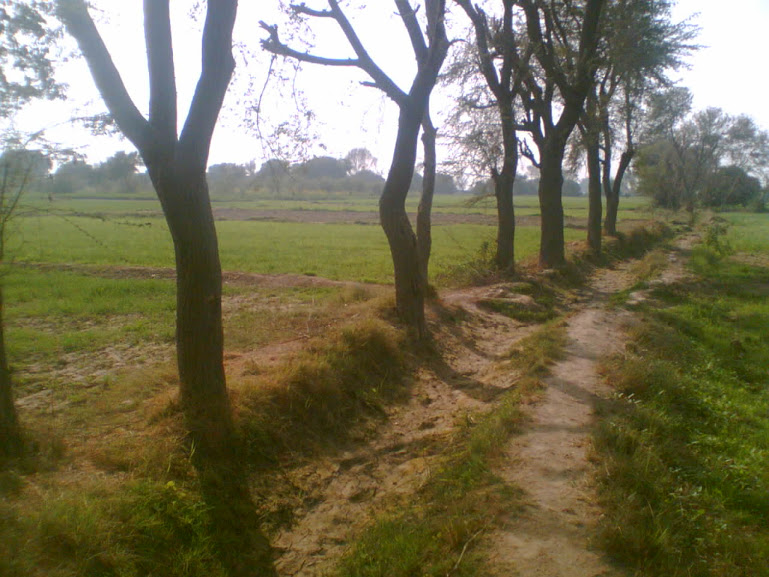
Trail along the water course outside the beautiful fields of Tunia Baqa Shah

== Government institutions ==
- Basic Health Unit, Tunia Baqa Shah
- Syed Muhammad Shah Government Boys Primary School
- Syed Muhammad Shah Government High School
- Syed Muhammad Shah Government Girls Middle School
- Syed Muhammad Shah Government Girls Primary School
