= Kotri Kabir =

Kotri Muhammad Kabir
- Location within Pakistan
- Coordinates: 27.343°N 68.483°E
- Country: Pakistan
- Province: Sindh
- Time zone: UTC+5 (PST)

Kotri Muhammad Kabir is a Union Council of Taluka Mehrabpur, Naushahro Feroze District, Sindh, Pakistan. It is situated along National Highway (N5). The tomb of the saint Mohammad Kabir and his son’ tomb Shakhi Allahyar is a feature of the town.

== Images ==
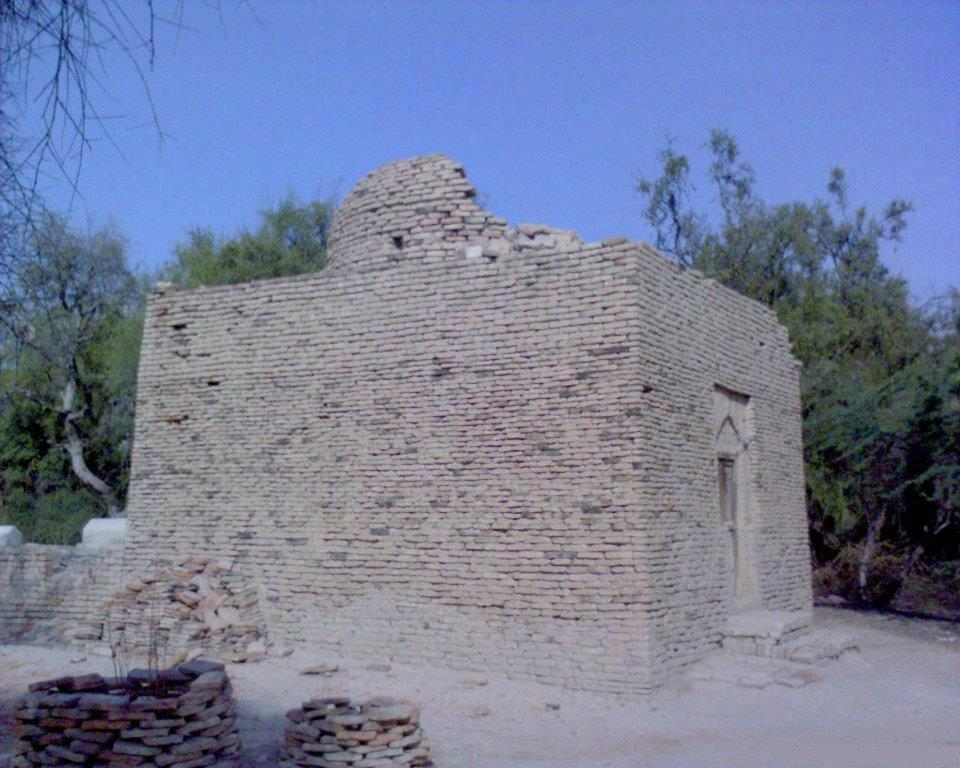
Shrine Of Makhdoom Haroon Bin Is'haque

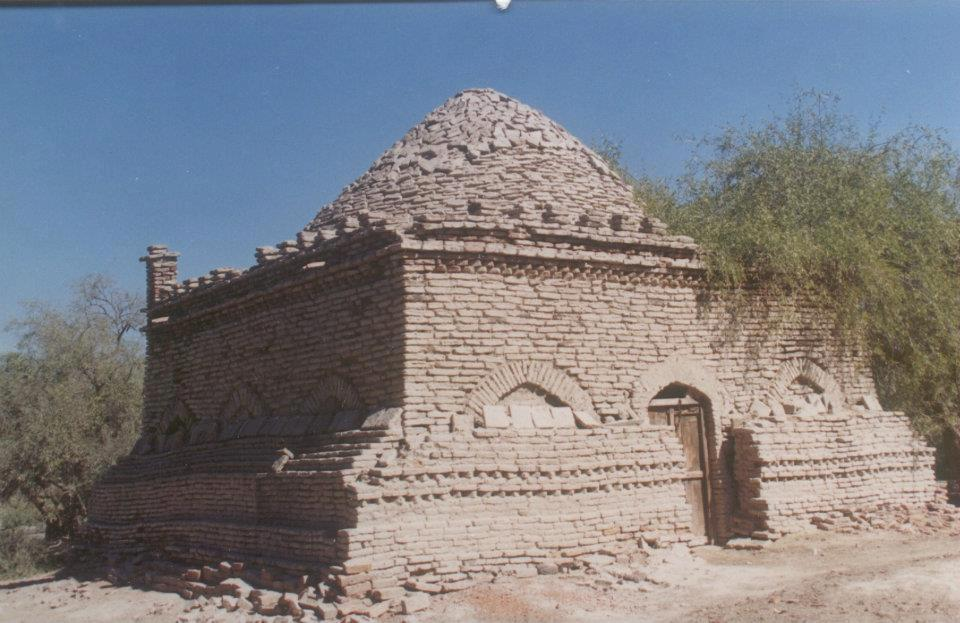
Shrine Of Makhdoom Mahmood.

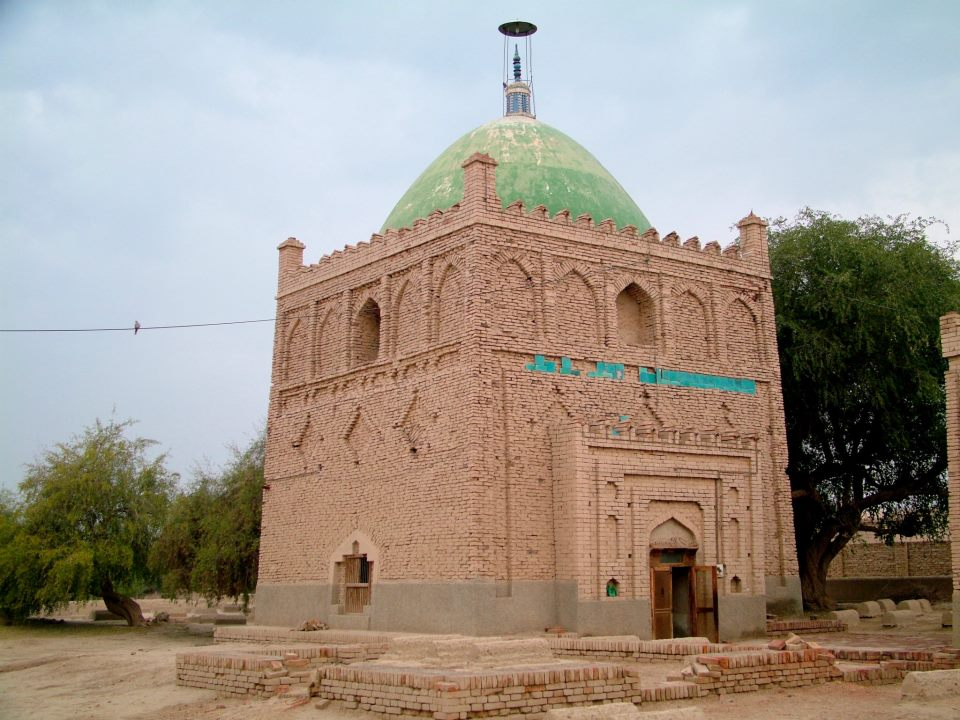
Shrine Of Makhdoom Muhammad Kabir

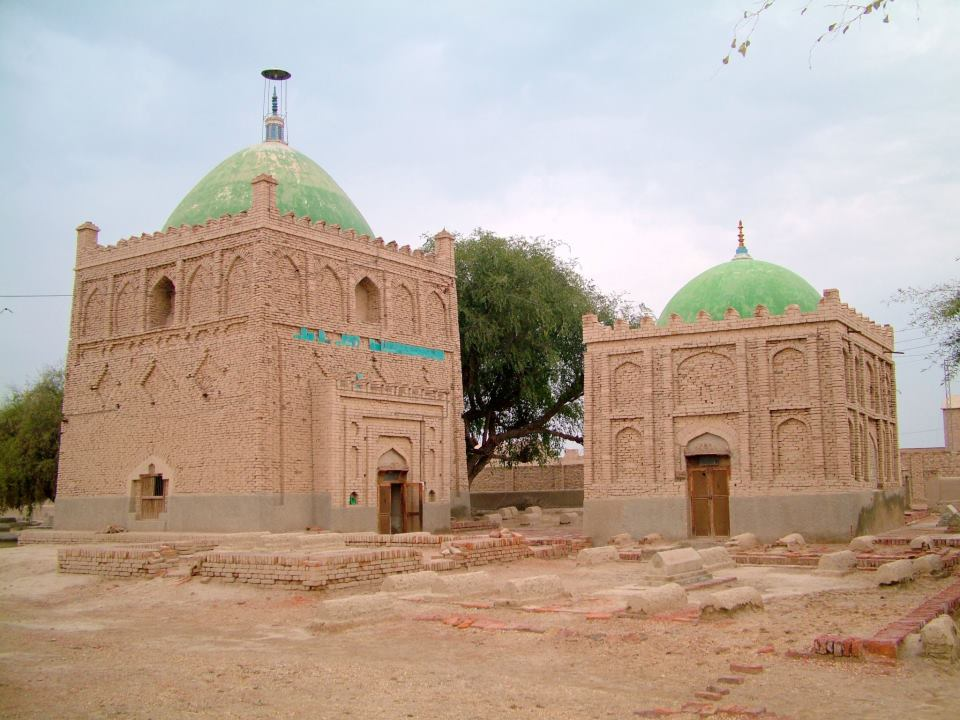
Shrine Of Makhdoom Muhammad Kabir

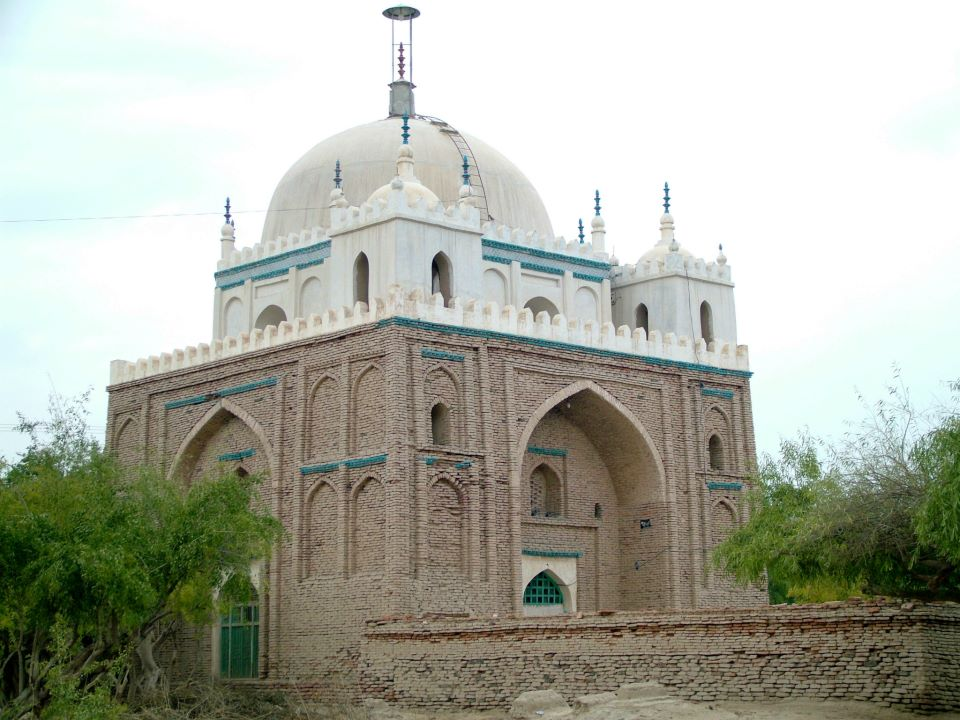
Shrine Of Makhdoom Sakhi Allah Yar
