= Madd Koondhar =

Madd Koondhar (Urdu: مڈ کوندھر), is a village in the Naushahro Feroze District, of Sindh, Pakistan, along Khan Wahan Miner. It contains over 125 houses and about 500 people. The literacy rate is 100%. Most of its highly-skilled workers are doctors, followed by engineers. The most common job overall is teacher and common industries include agriculture, business and government.
