= Sadikabad railway station =

Railway station in Punjab, Pakistan

Sadikabad Railway Station صادق آباد ریلوے اسٹیشن
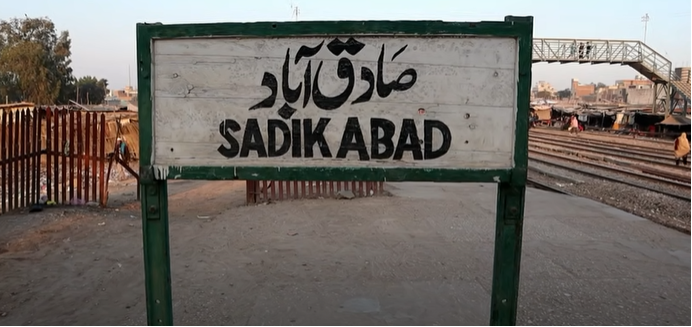

General information
- Coordinates: 28.3020°N 70.1285°E
- Owner: Ministry of Railways
- Line: Karachi–Peshawar Railway Line

Other information
- Station code: SDK

Services
Preceding station	Pakistan Railways	Following station
Machi Goth towards Kiamari	Karachi–Peshawar Line	Adamshaba towards Peshawar Cantonment
Location
- Location within Punjab, Pakistan Location within Pakistan

Sadiqabad Railway Station (Urdu and Punjabi: صادق آباد ریلوے اسٹیشن) is located in Sadiqabad city, Rahim Yar Khan district of Punjab province, Pakistan.

== See also ==
- List of railway stations in Pakistan
- Pakistan Railways
