= Shalimar Express =

Shalimar Express may refer to:

- Shalimar Express (India)
- Shalimar Express (Pakistan)
- Shalimar–Lokmanya Tilak Terminus Express
