= Kot Samaba railway station =

Railway station in Punjab, Pakistan

Kot Samaba Railway Station کوٹ سمابہ ریلوے اسٹیشن

General information
- Coordinates: 28.5368°N 70.4809°E
- Owner: Ministry of Railways
- Line: Karachi–Peshawar Railway Line

Other information
- Station code: KTSB

Services
| Preceding station | Pakistan Railways | Following station |
|---|---|---|
| Tarinda towards Kiamari | Karachi–Peshawar Line | Sahja towards Peshawar Cantonment |
Location

Kot Samaba Railway Station (Urdu and Punjabi: کوٹ سمابہ ریلوے اسٹیشن) is located in Kot Samaba village, Rahim Yar Khan district of Punjab province of the Pakistan.

== See also ==
- List of railway stations in Pakistan
- Pakistan Railways
