= Ghulam Rasool Khan Jatoi =

Pakistani politician

Member of the Provincial Assembly of Sindh
- In office 29 May 2013 – 28 May 2018

Personal details
- Born: 30 April 1966 (age 60) Karachi, Sindh, Pakistan
- Other political affiliations: National Peoples Party

Ghulam Rasool Khan Jatoi is a former Pakistani politician who had been a Member of the Provincial Assembly of Sindh, from May 2013 to May 2018 and has retired from politics in 2018 after completing of his term .

== Early life ==
He was born on 30 April 1966 in Moro.

== Political career ==
He was elected to the Provincial Assembly of Sindh as a candidate of National Peoples Party from Constituency PS-19 NAUSHERO FEROZE-I in the 2013 Pakistani general election.
