= Behlani =

Pakistani town

Behlani (Sindhi: بهلاڻي) is a town (Union Council) situated in Naushahro Feroze District of Sindh in Pakistan.

It is located 1 km from Halani (National Highway). It has many nineteenth-century buildings, some of which still have their original architecture. It remains a source of conflict between Kalohars and Mirs. A nearby town Mehrabpur is named for one of the brave soldiers of the Kalhoras' army, Mir Mehrab Khan Jatoi. It has poultry and fish farming, and rope made by coconut fibre used for filtering underground water supplied across Pakistan. A lake called "Behlani Dandh" is adjacent to the town.

Behlani was among the hardest-hit areas in Sindh during the devastating floods of 2022.

== Population ==
Behlani Union Council has a population of around 20,000, made up of the Sehto, Sehro, Malik, Mallah, Shaikh, Charan, Dobal, Arain, Bhatti, Siyal, Mughal, Lodhi pathan, Qureshi and a few other communities. Most of these communities live in small villages nearby.

== Village Sohrab Khan Unar ==
It is a village in Behlani Union Council in which mainly populated by the Unar community. This village has a government school and mosque. Most of the people here are farmers and taxi drivers by profession. The coordinates of the village are 27°5′39.4″N 68°21′35.3″E
