= Bhiria Road =

Pakistani town

Coordinates: 26.8861°N 68.2773°E

- Interactive map of Bhiria Road
- Country: Pakistan
- Province: Sindh

Population (2023)
  - Total: 30,527

Bhiria Road is a town in the Naushahro Feroze District of Sindh, Pakistan. It is located near N-5 National Highway and has a railway station on the Pakistan Railways network. The Town is named after the nearby town of Bhiria, which is located about 9 kilometers away.

The town has a population of over 30,527, according to the 2023 census, and spans an area of 4.52 square kilometres.

== Education ==
Among the school located in Bhiria Road is the Govt. Girls High School Bhiria Road.
