= Walhar railway station =

Railway station in Pakistan

Walhar Railway Station ولہار ریلوے سٹیشن

General information
- Coordinates: 28.2015°N 69.9906°E
- Owner: Ministry of Railways
- Line: Karachi–Peshawar Railway Line

Other information
- Station code: WLR

History
- Former names: Walhar Railway Station

Services
Preceding station	Pakistan Railways	Following station
Reti towards Kiamari	Karachi–Peshawar Line	Machi Goth towards Peshawar Cantonment
Location

Walhar Railway Station (Urdu, Punjabi: ولہار ریلوے سٹیشن) is located in Walhar village, Sadiqabad Tehsil of Punjab province, Pakistan.

== See also ==
- List of railway stations in Pakistan
- Pakistan Railways
