= Lakha Road =

- Town
- Location within Pakistan
- Coordinates: 26.9913°N 68.3428°E
- Country: Pakistan
- Province: Sindh
- District: Naushahro Feroze

Lakha Road is a town in Naushahro Firoz District in Sindh province of Pakistan.
