= Pakistan Falah Party =

- Founded: December 11, 2011

Party flag
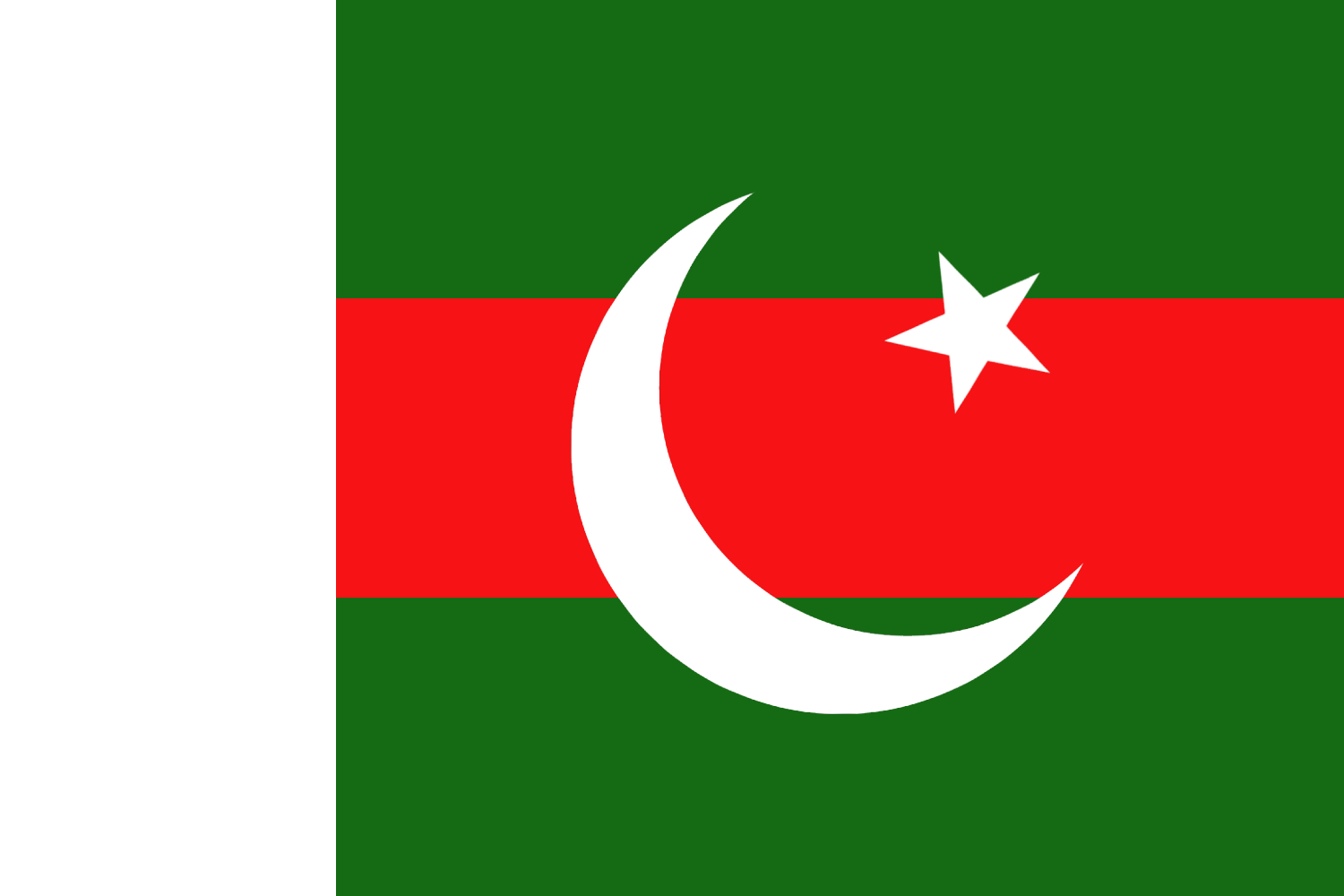

Website
- pfp.org.pk

The Pakistan Falah Party (Urdu: پاکستان فلاح پارٹی) is an independent political party based in Pakistan, Punjab. It was founded on 11 December 2011.
