= Machi Goth railway station =

Railway station in Pakistan

Machi Goth Railway Station ماچھی گوٹھ ریلوے اسٹیشن

General information
- Coordinates: 28.2567°N 70.0656°E
- Owner: Ministry of Railways
- Line: Karachi–Peshawar Railway Line

Other information
- Station code: MGQ

Services
Preceding station	Pakistan Railways	Following station
Shaheed Haider Ali towards Kiamari	Karachi–Peshawar Line	Sadikabad towards Peshawar Cantonment
Location

Machi Goth Railway Station (Urdu and Punjabi: ماچھی گوٹھ ریلوے اسٹیشن) is located in Machi Goth village, Rahim Yar Khan District of Punjab province, Pakistan.

== See also ==
- List of railway stations in Pakistan
- Pakistan Railways
