= Syed Serfraz Hussain Shah =

Pakistani politician

- سيد سرفراز حسين شاھ

Member of the Provincial Assembly of Sindh
- In office 13 August 2018 – 11 August 2023
- Constituency: PS-33 Naushahro Feroze-I
- In office 29 May 2013 – 28 May 2018

Personal details
- Born: 17 April 1951 (age 75) Kandiaro, Sindh, Pakistan
- Party: PPP (2013-present)

Syed Serfraz Hussain Shah (Sindhi: سيد سرفراز حسين شاھ) is a Pakistani politician who had been a Member of the Provincial Assembly of Sindh, from August 2018 till August 2023 and from May 2013 to May 2018.

== Early life and education ==
He was born on 17 April 1951 in Kandiaro.

He has a degree of Bachelor of Engineering in Civil.

== Political career ==
He was elected to the Provincial Assembly of Sindh as a candidate of Pakistan Peoples Party (PPP) from Constituency PS-21 NAUSHERO FEROZE-III in the 2013 Pakistani general election.

He was re-elected to Provincial Assembly of Sindh as a candidate of PPP from Constituency PS-33 (Naushahro Feroze-I) in the 2018 Pakistani general election.
