= Adam Sahaba =

Residential town in Punjab, Pakistan

Coordinates: 28°21′50″N 70°11′40″E

- Town and union council
- Interactive map of Adam Sahaba
- Country: Pakistan
- Province: Punjab
- District: Rahim Yar Khan District
- Tehsil: Sadiqabad
- Time zone: UTC+5 (PST)

Adam Sahaba is a town and union council of Sadiqabad Tehsil in the Rahim Yar Khan District of Pakistan. It is located at 28°21'50N 70°11'40E and lies between Sadiqabad and Rahim Yar Khan – the tehsil and district capitals, respectively.

Noteworthy locations in the area include the shrine of Adam Sahaba, with one of the largest graveyards in the Rahim Yaar Kahn district.
