= Syed Hassan Ali Shah =

Member of the Provincial Assembly of Sindh from Naushahro Feroze (2024–2029)

- سيد حسن علي شاھ

Member of the Provincial Assembly of Sindh
- Incumbent
- Assumed office 25 February 2024
- Constituency: PS-33 Naushahro Feroze-II

Personal details
- Party: PPP (2024-present)

Syed Hassan Ali Shah (Sindhi: سيد حسن علي شاھ; Urdu: سید حسن علی شاہ) is a Pakistani politician who is member of the Provincial Assembly of Sindh.

Shah won the 2024 Sindh provincial election from PS-33 Naushahro Feroze-II as a Pakistan People’s Party candidate. He received 60,617 votes while runner up Independent Supported (PTI) Pakistan Tehreek-e-Insaf, candidate Rizwan Ahmed received 2,791 votes.
