= Mehrabpur tehsil =

Mehrabpur (Tehsil) is an administrative subdivision of Naushahro Feroze District in the province of Sindh, Pakistan. The tehsil is subdivided into eight Union Councils and the city of Mehrabpur serves as the tehsil's administrative headquarter.

== Union Councils ==
Mehrabpur Taluka is administratively further divided into following 8 Union Councils:

- UC Mehrabpur 1
- UC Mehrabpur 2
- UC Halani
- UC Behlani
- UC Kotri.M.Kabir
- UC Lakha road
- UC Jaindo Rajper
- UC Saeed Pur
- UC Hote Khan Jalbani
