= Bukhtiarabad Domki =

Bellpatt بیل پٹ
- Town
- Bakhtiarabad Domki بختیار آباد ڈومکی
- Location within Pakistan
- Coordinates: 28.9926°N 68.0084°E
- Country: Pakistan
- Province: Balochistan
- District: Sibi District

Bukhtiarabad Domki (also spelled Bakhtiarabad Domki) (Urdu: بختیار آباد ڈومکی) is a town in Sibi district of Balochistan province in Pakistan. Earlier, it was a part of Lehri district until the abolition of Lehri district and annexed into Sibi in 2018. It is located 54 kilometers (34 mi) north of Dera Murad Jamali and 65 kilometers (40 mi) south of Sibi.

Bakhtiarabad Domki railway station is on the Rohri–Chaman Line. and also linked with network of CPEC Motorway via link Road.
