= Kolpur =

Kolpur کولپور
- Town
- Location in Pakistan Kolpur (Pakistan)
- Coordinates: 29°54′7.67″N 67°7′58.14″E
- Country: Pakistan
- Region: Balochistan
- District: Kachhi District
- Elevation: 1,781 m (5,843 ft)
- Time zone: UTC+5 (PST)

Kolpur (Urdu: کولپور) is a town and union council of Kachhi District in the Balochistan province of Pakistan. It is located at 29.902°N 67.133°E and has an altitude of 2,087 metres (6,847 ft).

== History ==
In 1890, during the British Indian government's railway track construction project, workers from different regions of the Indian subcontinent, including members of the Hindu community, were recruited to Kolpur. Since then, the majority of population in Kolpur is of Hinduism followers. Kolpur railway station is on the Rohri–Chaman Line.
