= Aab-e-Gum =

Pakistani town

Ab-e-gum
- Union Council
- آب گم
- Location in Pakistan Ab-e-gum (Pakistan)
- Coordinates: 29°48′26″N 67°24′2″E
- Country: Pakistan
- Region: Balochistan
- District: Kachhi District
- Time zone: UTC+5 (PST)

Ab-e-gum or Abegum (Urdu: آب گم) is a town and union council of Kachhi District located 50 kilometers (31 mi) southeast of Quetta near the Chiltan mountains, in the Balochistan province of Pakistan. It also has a railway station on Rohri–Chaman Railway Line which was built by the British in 1886. The area is an important supplier of gas.

== Etymology ==
Aab-e-gum means 'water lost', a name given to the spot for a spring that dives underground nearby.

== See also ==
- Aab-e-Gum derailment, a 2015 fatal accident
