= Constituency PS-20 (Naushero Feroze-II) =

Former constituency of the Provincial Assembly of Sindh, Pakistan

PS-20 Naushero Feroze-II
- Former constituency for the Provincial Assembly of Sindh

Former constituency
- Abolished: 2018

PS-20 Naushero Feroze-II was a constituency of the Provincial Assembly of Sindh. It was abolished after 2018 Delimitations as Naushahro Feroze District lost 1 seat in 2017 Census.

== See also ==
- Sindh
