= Syed Zafar Ali Shah =

Pakistani politician

Syed Zafar Ali Shah MNA

14th Deputy Speaker of the National Assembly of Pakistan
- In office 17 October 1993 – 5 November 1996
- Speaker: Yousaf Raza Gillani
- Preceded by: Mohammad Nawaz Khokhar
- Succeeded by: Chaudhry Jaffar Iqbal

Minister of State for Water & Power
- In office 31 March 1989 – 6 August 1990
- Prime Minister: Benazir Bhutto
- Preceded by: Elahi Bux Soomro (caretaker)
- Succeeded by: Raja Nadir Pervez

Member of the National Assembly of Pakistan
- In office 20 March 1985 – 16 March 2013

Personal details
- Party: PTI (2013-present)
- Other political affiliations: PPP (1960-2013)

Syed Zafar Ali Shah (Urdu: سید ظفر علی شاه) is a Pakistani politician who has served as member of the National Assembly of Pakistan between 1985 and 1998. A member of Pakistan Tehreek e Insaf, Shah previously served as the Deputy Speaker of the National Assembly from 1993 to 1996.

== Education ==
He graduated with M.A and LL.B degrees.

== Political career ==
Shah was elected to the Provincial Assembly of NWFP in the 1962 Pakistani general election and again in the 1970 Pakistani general election. He has held the position of Deputy Speaker of Provincial Assembly of Sindh from 1962 to 1965 and Provincial Minister for Food, Forests, Livestocks and Fisheries, Sindh, in 1984. Shah was elected to the National Assembly of Pakistan for the first time in the 1985 Pakistani general election and appointed as Federal Minister for Industries, Food, Agriculture and Livestock in 1985. He was re-elected to the National Assembly of Pakistan in the 1988 Pakistani general election, and appointed as Federal Minister of State for Water and Power in 1989. He was re-elected to the National Assembly of Pakistan from NA-159 constituency on PPP ticket in the 1990 Pakistani general election, and in the 1993 Pakistani general election. He held the position of National Assembly Deputy Speaker in 1993. He was elected to the National Assembly from NA-212 (Naushero Feroze-II) on PPP ticket in the 2002 Pakistani general election. He was re-elected to the National Assembly from NA-212 (Naushero Feroze-II) on PPP ticket in the 2008 Pakistani general election.

In 2013, he left PPP to join Pakistan Muslim League N. He ran for the seat of National Assembly from NA-212 (Naushero Feroze-II) on PML-N ticket in the 2013 Pakistani general election

Political offices
| Preceded by Haji M. Nawaz Khokhar | Deputy Speaker of the National Assembly; 17 October 1993 – 5 November 1996 | Succeeded by Chaudhry Muhammad Jaffar Iqbal |
