= Jehangira Road =

- Town
- Location within Pakistan
- Coordinates: 33.9592°N 72.1972°E
- Country: Pakistan
- Province: Khyber Pakhtunkhwa
- District: Nowshera

Jehangira Road (Also spelled Jahangira Road) is a town in Nowshera District of Khyber Pakhtunkhwa province in Pakistan. It is located on the bank of River Kabul at 33°57 North 72°11 East.
