= Bhiria =

City in Sindh, Pakistan

Coordinates: 26°55′00″N 68°12′00″E

- Interactive map of Bhiria
- Country: Pakistan
- Province: Sindh

Population (2023 Census)
  - Total: 14,370

Bhiria City (Urdu: بهِريا) (Sindhi: ڀريا) (Memoni: ڀريا) is a town in Naushahro Feroze District in Sindh province of Pakistan.

There are two separate towns with name "Bhiria" in district Naushahro Feroze: Bhiria Road and Bhiria City, which are at the distance of 10 km from each other. Bhiria City is the Taluka headquarters.

== History ==
The ancient name of Bhiria City was "Bahrawer" is on the main National highway between Karachi and Peshawar, whereas Bhiria Road town's old name was "Machhiki Goth" is on the main Railway line between Karachi and Peshawar. History tells the old town Bhiria/Bahrawer was situated in the north of current town, old ruins of fort called Bahrawer are still visible there. After the destruction of the old town, inhabitants moved first to a village called KOT BAHADUR a few kilometres away from the town and a higher place to stay safe from floods, and then came back and rebuilt the town at its current location. The old site of the town is also being doubted from one of three places where Raja Daher is believed to be killed by Arab forces.

Its economy is agriculture based, wheat and cotton are main crops. Bhiria City is also famous for the best quality of guavas and mangoes, (Kheer Pera) is a popular sweet of the town, people buy and give as a gift to their family and friends in other countries as well. Bhiria City is also famous for its education in older times, K.C Academy was one of the oldest educationalist institution of Sindh after one at Hyderabad, Sindh madrasa Karachi and high school Shikarpur, it was formed by Dewan Koro Mal Chanden Mal a leading educationist of Sindh in 1886 this institute served for more than 100 years and produced many famous personalities, excellent library and a huge drama hall were its unique qualities. Old buildings of school, hostel, drama hall and library are now houses but still existing at Memon Mohalla on Tharu Shah road Bhirya.
