= Setharja =

- Town
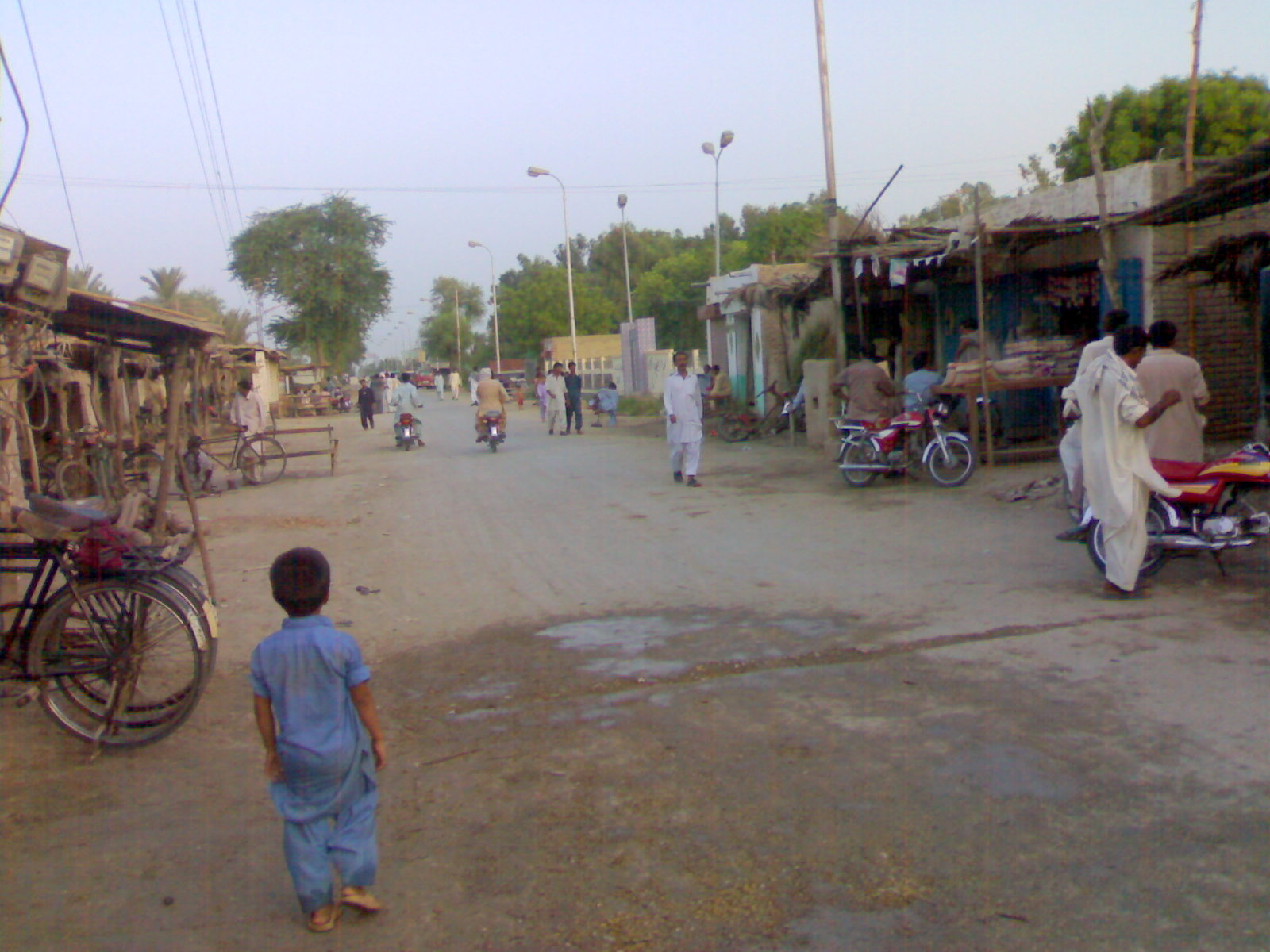
- Thari Road in Setharja

- Location within Pakistan
- Coordinates: 27.2034°N 68.4801°E
- Country: Pakistan
- Province: Sindh
- District: Khairpur
- Thari Mirwah: Thari Mirwah

Population (2023)
  - Total: 32,741

Setharja is a town in Thari Mirwah Tehsil of Khairpur District in Sindh province of Pakistan.
