= Padidan =

Town in Sindh, Pakistan

Padidan پَڊيدن
- Town
- Location within Pakistan
- Coordinates: 26.7833°N 68.3000°E
- Country: Pakistan
- Province: Sindh
- District: Naushahro Feroze

Padidan (also spelled Pad Idan) (Urdu: پڈعیدن) (Sindhi: پَڊيدن) is a town in Naushahro Feroze district of Sindh province in Pakistan. It is located at 26°46'N and 68°17'E and has an altitude of 150 feet (46 m).

Padidan lies under the jurisdiction of Naushahro Feroze. Padidan is located in the central part of Sindh, along the main railway track. Padidan is also connected with Sukkur and Karachi by the main National Highway (Motorway) N-5, which is about 18 km from Padidan. The main railway line up to Peshawar and down to Karachi is the main transportation route for citizens.

Padidan has a population of over 25,000 and a traditional Sindhi culture. The Shalwar kameez is a common dress; many women wear hijabs as well. Sindhi is common here, and the Pakistan People's Party (PPP) is strong in the region.

While agriculture is the main source of employment for the rural population of the town, in urban areas people are engaged in a wider variety of employment, both private and government-run. The main livelihood for the town is agriculture; 70% of the population is involved in agricultural activities. Padidan City is the main trading center of this district.

Padidan was one of the most active cities of Sindh during Sindhudesh movement was at its hype. Bashir Khan Qureshi visited Padidan lots of times in his life for political rallies and meetings, when he was arrested in 2011 Padidan was among those cities who protested so much. Still Jeay Sindh Qaumi Mahaz and Jeay Sindh Students’ Federation are most famous under youth of Padidan still there are lots of national flags of Sindh in Padidan's streets.

Padidan was also the most effected city by the Sindh Flood of 2022, the city experienced the highest rainfall at 1763.9 mm.

== Government and Infrastructure ==
Padidan has an Office of Town Committee which is responsible for managing the administration setup. Government facilities in Padidan include the Padidan Basic Health Unit, Padidan Railway Station, Padidan Police Station, Pakistan Meteorological Department, among others.

Education of the town is very poor, so many private schools are available though quality is quite low. Only a single boys and girls high school is present, for the graduation students have to move forward about 18–80 km.

The town is currently facing multiple issues, such as narrow roads which cause traffic congestion in the peak hours. No academy is available for graduation studies. Poor solid waste management has resulted in severe diseases within the community. The town has only one single Basic Health Unit (BHU) which is not sufficient for the town's population. A convention hall is not available for the population of the town either, hindering the ability of the citizens to discuss issues. Padian's Railway Station was built in 1916. It is built as cultural style of British Raj. There were over 30 Station headquarters for management station and a very beautiful Station master house with open greenery garden and tennis pitch, quarters are these days used by flood affecties and homeless people. Railway also has a police station for railway police, Emergency hospital, Post station and mosque but all are destroyed and corrupt management they don't look after those buildings. Railway also had a big tank wells which were being used till 1970s to full fill the trains' fuel.

== Climate ==
Climate data for Padidan (1961–1990)
Month	Jan	Feb	Mar	Apr	May	Jun	Jul	Aug	Sep	Oct	Nov	Dec	Year
Record high °C (°F)	39.0 (102.2)	37.0 (98.6)	41.1 (106.0)	47.3 (117.1)	50.0 (122.0)	51.0 (123.8)	48.0 (118.4)	47.0 (116.6)	44.4 (111.9)	43.0 (109.4)	38.3 (100.9)	32.7 (90.9)	51.0 (123.8)
Mean daily maximum °C (°F)	23.2 (73.8)	26.0 (78.8)	32.2 (90.0)	39.9 (103.8)	43.5 (110.3)	44.2 (111.6)	41.2 (106.2)	39.3 (102.7)	38.8 (101.8)	36.7 (98.1)	30.7 (87.3)	24.5 (76.1)	34.9 (94.8)
Daily mean °C (°F)	14.2 (57.6)	16.9 (62.4)	23.0 (73.4)	29.6 (85.3)	34.2 (93.6)	35.9 (96.6)	34.5 (94.1)	32.8 (91.0)	31.2 (88.2)	27.2 (81.0)	21.2 (70.2)	15.6 (60.1)	26.4 (79.5)
Mean daily minimum °C (°F)	5.3 (41.5)	8.1 (46.6)	14.0 (57.2)	20.2 (68.4)	24.7 (76.5)	27.6 (81.7)	27.5 (81.5)	26.3 (79.3)	23.5 (74.3)	17.7 (63.9)	11.6 (52.9)	6.6 (43.9)	17.8 (64.0)
Record low °C (°F)	−2.8 (27.0)	−3.0 (26.6)	3.0 (37.4)	10.0 (50.0)	11.5 (52.7)	2.5 (36.5)	18.5 (65.3)	18.9 (66.0)	14.0 (57.2)	7.0 (44.6)	1.1 (34.0)	−1.1 (30.0)	−3.0 (26.6)
Average precipitation mm (inches)	1.2 (0.05)	4.5 (0.18)	4.5 (0.18)	2.1 (0.08)	1.5 (0.06)	3.2 (0.13)	41.7 (1.64)	30.7 (1.21)	11.8 (0.46)	1.9 (0.07)	2.1 (0.08)	3.3 (0.13)	108.3 (4.26)
Source: NOAA
