= Naushahro Feroze =

Pakistani town

- City
- Location within Sindh Location within Pakistan
- Coordinates: 26°51′N 68°08′E
- Country: Pakistan
- Province: Sindh

Government
  - Type: Municipal Committee
  - Chairman: Pir Qurban Ali
  - Vice-Chairman: Kashif Mustafa
- Elevation: 38 m (125 ft)

Population (2023)
  - City: 87,416
  - Rank: 148th in Pakistan
- Time zone: UTC+5 (PST)
- Website: www.facebook.com/NaushahroFiroz/

Naushahro Feroze (Urdu: نوشہرو فیروز, Sindhi: نوشهرو فیروز) is the capital city of Naushahro Feroze District in Sindh province of Pakistan. The district is located at 26°50'0N 68°7'0E with an altitude of 38 metres (127 feet).

Naushahro Feroze District borders Khairpur District in the north-east, Dadu District to the west Indus river makes a natural boundary between the two districts, Larkana District in the north-west, and its south-east border is surrounded by Nawabshah District.

Sindhi is spoken by majority of Residents of Naushahro Feroze, along with other languages such as Urdu, Punjabi, Bagri, Saraiki, Balochi, Hindko etc.

== Demographics ==
Population

Historical population
| Year | Pop. | ±% |
|---|---|---|
| 1972 | 7,977 | — |
| 1981 | 8,567 | +7.4% |
| 1998 | 15,158 | +76.9% |
| 2017 | 38,204 | +152.0% |
| 2023 | 87,416 | +128.8% |

According to 2023 census, Naushehro Feroze city had a population of 87,146.

Languages

Languages of Naushehro Feroz city (2023 Census)
1. Sindhi (95.1%)
2. Urdu (3.60%)
3. Others (1.30%)

== Climate ==
Naushahro Feroze has a hot desert climate (Köppen climate classification BWh) with extremely hot summers and mild winters. There is very little rain, and it mainly falls in the monsoon season from July to September.

Climate data for Naushahro Feroze
| Month | Jan | Feb | Mar | Apr | May | Jun | Jul | Aug | Sep | Oct | Nov | Dec | Year |
|---|---|---|---|---|---|---|---|---|---|---|---|---|---|
| Record high °C (°F) | 39.0 (102.2) | 37.0 (98.6) | 41.1 (106.0) | 47.3 (117.1) | 50.0 (122.0) | 51.0 (123.8) | 48.0 (118.4) | 47.0 (116.6) | 44.4 (111.9) | 43.0 (109.4) | 38.3 (100.9) | 32.7 (90.9) | 51.0 (123.8) |
| Mean daily maximum °C (°F) | 23.2 (73.8) | 26.0 (78.8) | 32.2 (90.0) | 39.0 (102.2) | 43.5 (110.3) | 44.2 (111.6) | 41.2 (106.2) | 39.3 (102.7) | 38.8 (101.8) | 36.7 (98.1) | 30.7 (87.3) | 24.5 (76.1) | 34.9 (94.9) |
| Daily mean °C (°F) | 14.2 (57.6) | 16.9 (62.4) | 23.0 (73.4) | 29.6 (85.3) | 34.2 (93.6) | 35.9 (96.6) | 34.5 (94.1) | 32.8 (91.0) | 31.2 (88.2) | 27.2 (81.0) | 21.2 (70.2) | 15.6 (60.1) | 26.4 (79.5) |
| Mean daily minimum °C (°F) | 5.3 (41.5) | 8.1 (46.6) | 14.0 (57.2) | 20.2 (68.4) | 24.7 (76.5) | 27.6 (81.7) | 27.5 (81.5) | 26.3 (79.3) | 23.5 (74.3) | 17.7 (63.9) | 11.6 (52.9) | 6.6 (43.9) | 17.8 (64.0) |
| Record low °C (°F) | −2.8 (27.0) | −3.0 (26.6) | 3.0 (37.4) | 10.0 (50.0) | 11.5 (52.7) | — | 18.5 (65.3) | 18.9 (66.0) | 14.0 (57.2) | 7.0 (44.6) | 1.1 (34.0) | −1.1 (30.0) | −3.0 (26.6) |
| Average precipitation mm (inches) | 1.2 (0.05) | 4.5 (0.18) | 4.5 (0.18) | 2.1 (0.08) | 1.5 (0.06) | 3.2 (0.13) | 41.7 (1.64) | 30.7 (1.21) | 11.8 (0.46) | 1.9 (0.07) | 2.1 (0.08) | 3.3 (0.13) | 108.5 (4.27) |
Source: NOAA (1961–1990)

== Notable people ==
- Haji Khan Larik , Muslim leader and freedom fighter.
- Ghulam Mustafa Jatoi , 9th chief minister of Sindh and Caretaker Prime Minister of Pakistan
- Syed Murad Ali Shah , Member of Provincial Assembly Sindh
