= Kandiaro Tehsil =

Administrative subdivision of Naushahro Feroze, Sindh, Pakistan

Tehsil Kandiaro Map

Kandiaro Tehsil (Tehsil) is an administrative subdivision of Naushahro Feroze District in Sindh province, Pakistan. Administratively, Tehsil Kandiaro is subdivided into 1 Town Committee and 16 Union Councils and is headquartered at the city of Kandiaro. In terms of revenue administration, this Tehsil is divided into 3 Supervisory Tapedar Circles, 18 Tapas and 52 Dehs. Mohabat Dero, Khan Wahan Taluka Kandiaro Major Cities

== Population ==
322,439 (Pakistan Census 2017)

== Town Committee ==
1. TC Kandiaro

| S # | Town Committee | Deh | Population | Area |
|---|---|---|---|---|
| 1 | KANDIARO | Kandiaro (Part) | 39,379 | |

== Union councils ==
1. UC Bhorti 2. UC Dabhro 3. UC Detha 4. UC Ghanghra 5. UC Ghullam Shah 6. UC Jam Noorullah 7. UC Kamal Dero 8. UC Kandhar 9. UC Khanwahan 10. UC Koro Khushk 11. UC Manjuth 12. UC Mohbat Dero Jatoi 13. UC Mohbat Dero Siyal 14. UC Moria 15. UC Shaikhani 16. UC Soomar Chanar

| S # | UC | Deh | Population | Area |
|---|---|---|---|---|
| 1 | BHORTI | Bhorti | 13,532 | |
| 2 | DABHRO | | 21,474 | |
| | i | Dabhro | 14,379 | |
| | ii | Larik | 7,095 | |
| 3 | DETHA | | 13,126 | |
| | i | Detha | 9,276 | |
| | ii | Kalatagar-1 | 1,308 | |
| | iii | Kalatagar-2 | 224 | |
| | vi | Sona Bindi | 2,318 | |
| 4 | GHANGHRA | | 18,795 | |
| | i | Bazeedpur | 5,317 | |
| | ii | Ghanghra | 9,910 | |
| | iii | Lakha | 3,568 | |
| 5 | GHULAM SHAH | | 24,659 | |
| | i | Ghulam Shah | 13,914 | |
| | ii | Kandiaro Rural | 10,745 | |
| 6 | JAM NOORULLAH | | 18,619 | |
| | i | Chachak | 6,487 | |
| | ii | Jaipota | 2,742 | |
| | iii | Mirzapur | 3,870 | |
| | iv | Sethar | 5,520 | |
| 7 | KAMALDERO | | 27,716 | |
| | i | Bakhri-1 | 4,104 | |
| | ii | Bakhri-2 | 482 | |
| | iii | Belo Bhounr | 2,205 | |
| | iv | Belo Kamaldero | 899 | |
| | v | Belo Samtia | 1,315 | |
| | vi | Kamaldero-1 | 708 | |
| | vii | Kamaldero-2 | 130 | |
| | viii | Mahesar | 8,998 | |
| | ix | Samtia | 748 | |
| | x | Shahmirdero | 8,127 | |
| 8 | KANDHAR | | 13,894 | |
| | i | Budak | 3,895 | |
| | ii | Kandhar | 9,999 | |
| 9 | KHANWAHAN | Khanwahan | 14,557 | |
| 10 | Kouro Khushk | | 14,410 | |
| | i | Gulshah | 9,705 | |
| | ii | Kouro Khushk | 4,705 | |
| 11 | MANJUTH | | 20,344 | |
| | | Bhagudero-1 | 6,388 | |
| | | Bhagudero-2 | 1,349 | |
| | | Darbelo New | 1,901 | |
| | | Manjuth | 7,561 | |
| | | Sahita | 3,145 | |
| 12 | MOHABATDERO JATOI | | 13,706 | |
| | i | Maachi | 7,880 | |
| | ii | Mohabatdero Jatoi | 5,826 | |
| 13 | MOHABATDERO SIYAL | | 9,252 | |
| | i | Belo Mohabatdero | 847 | |
| | ii | Lundi | 2,831 | |
| | iii | Mohabatdero Siyal | 5,574 | |
| 14 | MORIA | | 18,690 | |
| | i | Moria | 8,935 | |
| | ii | Pirmard | 9,755 | |
| 15 | SHAIKHANI | | 20,586 | |
| | i | Moosodero | 8,980 | |
| | ii | Shaikhani | 11,606 | |
| 16 | SOOMAR CHANAR | | 19,700 | |
| | i | Abad-3 | 1,274 | |
| | ii | Darbelo Old | 5,659 | |
| | iii | Haji Shah | 1,776 | |
| | iv | Khairodero | 408 | |
| | v | Ladho Bisharat | 204 | |
| | vi | Salehpur | 10,024 | |
| | vii | Thath Moosa | 355 | |

== List of Dehs ==
| S# | Supervisory Tapedar Circle | Tapa Name | Deh Name | Area (Acre-Ghunta) | Population |
|---|---|---|---|---|---|
| 1 | DABHRO | | | | |
| | 1 | ABAD | | | |
| | | i | Abad-3 | 2420-2 | 1,274 |
| | | ii | Khairodero | 1822-26 | 408 |
| | | iii | Ladho Bisharat | 2601-36 | 204 |
| | | iv | Samtia | 1783-32 | 748 |
| | | v | Thath Moosa | 2393-11 | 355 |
| | 2 | BHAGUDERO | | | |
| | | i | Bhagudero-1 | 1304-38 | 6,388 |
| | | ii | Bhagudero-2 | 3748-36 | 1,349 |
| | | iii | Darbelo Old | 1579-18 | 5,659 |
| | | iv | Haji Shah | 2315-9 | 1,776 |
| | | v | Sona Bindi | 4102-10 | 2,318 |
| | 3 | BHORTI | | | |
| | | i | Bhorti | 5871-8 | 13,532 |
| | | ii | Detha | 2267-30 | 9,276 |
| | 4 | DABHRO | | | |
| | | i | Dabhro | 3820-11 | 14,379 |
| | | ii | Darbelo New | 1892-35 | 1901 |
| | | iii | Larik | 2210-0 | 7,095 |
| | 5 | MANJUTH | | | |
| | | i | Kalatagar-1 | 4056-13 | 1,308 |
| | | ii | Kalatagar-2 | 1979-10 | 224 |
| | | iii | Manjuth | 1256-26 | 7,561 |
| | | iv | Sahita | 2837-32 | 3,145 |
| 2 | GULSHAH | | | | |
| | 1 | GULSHAH | | | |
| | | i | Gul Shah | 3347-13 | 9,705 |
| | | ii | Kouro Khushk | 2041-5 | 4,705 |
| | 2 | KAMALDERO | | | |
| | | i | Bakhri-1 | 2701-26 | 4,104 |
| | | ii | Bakhri-2 | 118-2 | 482 |
| | | iii | Belo Bhounr | 3419-4 | 2,205 |
| | | iv | Belo Kamaldero | 1030-6 | 899 |
| | | v | Belo Samtia | 3418-4 | 1,315 |
| | | vi | Kamaldero-1 | 1021-27 | 708 |
| | | vii | Kamaldero-2 | 507-21 | 130 |
| | 3 | KHANWAHAN | | | |
| | | i | Khanwahan | 3138-29 | 14,557 |
| | | ii | Lundi | 2419-3 | 2,831 |
| | | iii | Mohbatdero Siyal | 2669-24 | 5,574 |
| | 4 | MOOSODERO | | | |
| | | i | Maachi | 3668-18 | 7,880 |
| | | ii | Moosodero | 3308-8 | 8,980 |
| | 5 | SHAIKHANI | | | |
| | | i | Belo Mohbatdero | 2534-0 | 847 |
| | | ii | Mohbatdero Jagir | 1729-23 | 5,826 |
| | | iii | Shaikhani | 3622-26 | 11,606 |
| 3 | KANDIARO | | | | |
| | 1 | CHACHAK | Chachak | 2778-37 | 6,487 |
| | 2 | GHANGHRA | | | |
| | | i | Bazeedpur | 2186-30 | 5,317 |
| | | ii | Ghanghra | 2795-10 | 9,910 |
| | 3 | GHULAM SHAH | | | |
| | | i | Budak | 1939-17 | 3,895 |
| | | ii | Ghulam Shah | 4001-6 | 13,914 |
| | | iii | Kandhar | 2825-6 | 9,999 |
| | 4 | KANDIARO | | | |
| | | i | Kandiaro | 3341-31 | 50,124 |
| | | ii | Lakha | 2383-20 | 3,568 |
| | 5 | MIRZAPUR | | | |
| | | i | Jai Pota | 2307-29 | 2,742 |
| | | ii | Mirzapur | 1964-2 | 3,870 |
| | 6 | SALEHPUR | | | |
| | | i | Moria | 3743-16 | 8,935 |
| | | ii | Salehpur | 3511-14 | 10,024 |
| | 7 | SETHAR | | | |
| | | i | Pirmard | 2928-15 | 9,755 |
| | | ii | Sethar | 2117-24 | 5,520 |
| | 8 | SHAHMIRDERO | | | |
| | | i | Mahesar | 3315-12 | 8,998 |
| | | ii | Shahmir Dero | 3284-31 | 8,127 |
