= Naushahro Feroze District =

Coordinates: 26°50′24″N 68°07′12″E

Naushahro Feroze District ضلع نوشہرو فیروز نوشهرو فيروز ضلعو
- District of Sindh
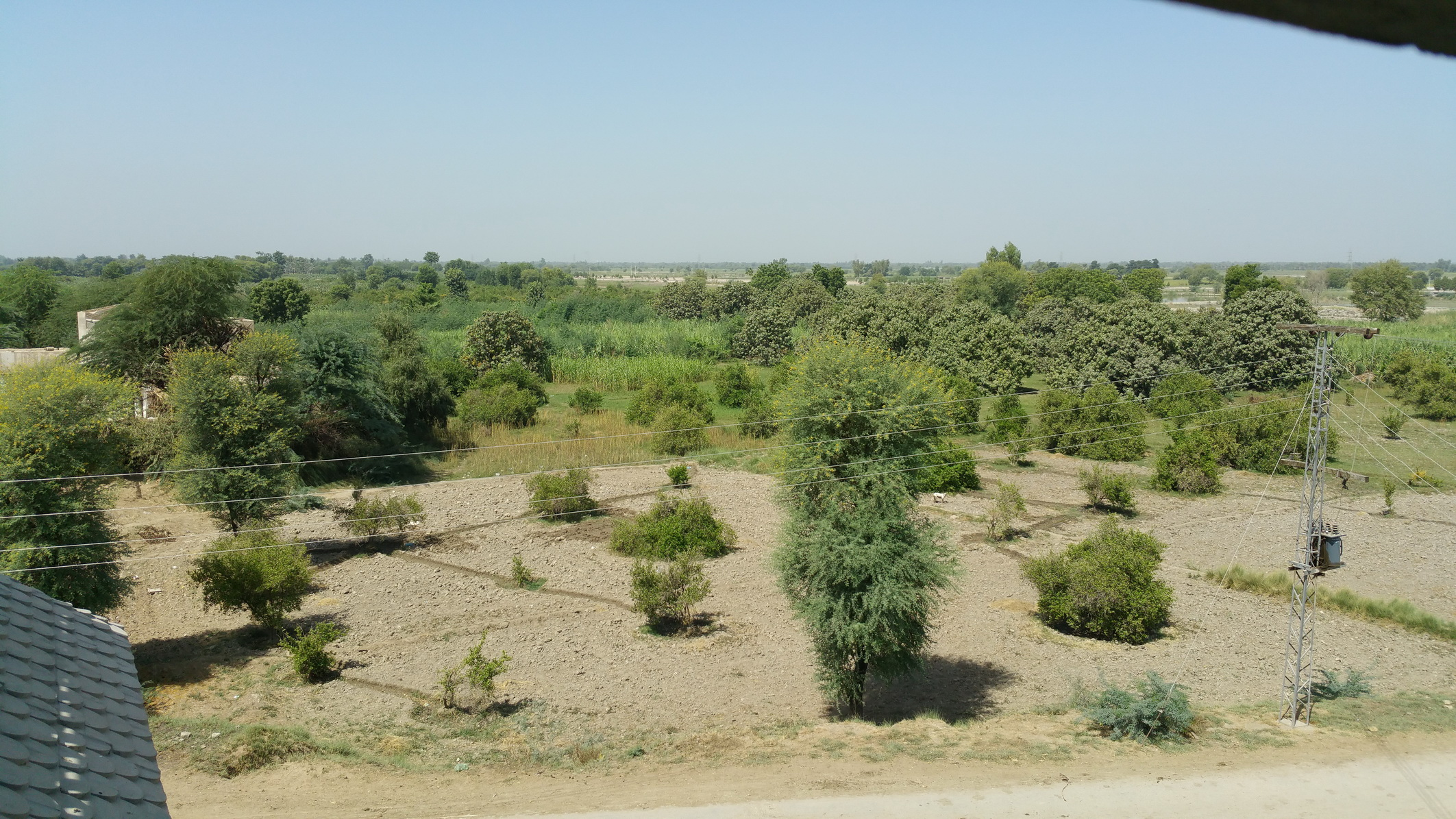
- Fields in Naushahro Feroze district

- Map of Sindh with Naushahro Feroze District (نوشهرو فیروز) highlighted
- Country: Pakistan
- Province: Sindh
- Division: Shaheed Benazir Abad
- Largest city: Moro
- Headquarters: Naushahro Feroze

Government
  - Deputy Commissioner: Muhammad Arslan Saleem
  - District Police Officer: Sanghar Malik
  - District Health Officer: Dr.Sikandar Ali Kalhoro,

Area
  - District of Sindh: 2,946 km^{2} (1,137 sq mi)

Population (2023)
  - District of Sindh: 1,777,082
  - Density: 603.2/km^{2} (1,562/sq mi)
  - Urban: 507,244
  - Rural: 1,269,838

Literacy
  - Literacy rate: Total: 57.15%; Male: 67.58%; Female: 46.36%
- Time zone: UTC+5 (PST)
- Website: www.facebook.com/sindhacademy/

Naushahro Feroze District (Sindhi: نوشهرو فيروز ضلعو, Urdu: ضلع نوشهرو فیروز) is a district in the province of Sindh, Pakistan. Its capital is Naushahro Feroze city. Administratively subdivided into five talukas and 51 union councils, according to the 2017 census of Pakistan it had a population of 1,612,373. The Naushahro Feroze was given the status of District on 15 November 1989 and. Before, it was Taluka of Nawabshah District (Now Shaheed Benazirabad District). On given status as district, Naushahro Feroze was placed under administrative control of Sukkur Division however, it has been placed under Shaheed Benazirabad Division during 2011.

== Historic sites in Naushahro Feroze District ==
=== The Kalhora Mosque ===
The Kalhora Mosque in the village of Dali, located on the Kandiaro Road in Naushero Feroze, is a historically significant structure dating back to 1139 Hijri (1726 CE). Built during the Kalhora period, the mosque has experienced numerous repairs and alterations over the years. The walls of the mosque are 8 feet thick, and the domes have suffered damage, including cracks that have raised concerns about its structural integrity among local worshippers.

The mosque's last major repair occurred in 1979, but the Memon community, which manages the mosque, has expressed concerns over its deteriorating condition. They have called for immediate repairs or renovations, warning that without government intervention, they may be forced to demolish the mosque and rebuild it from scratch.

== Government and politics ==
=== National Assembly representation ===
District Naushahro Feroze has two members in National Assembly of Pakistan. The district electoral is referred to as NA-211 and NA-212. The member elected from NA-212 represents the constituencies of Moro and Naushahro Feroze Talukas. The member elected from NA-211 represents Kandiaro, Bhirya and Mehrabpur Talukas.

=== Provincial Assembly representation ===
The district has five member representation in Provincial Assembly of Sindh. The provincial assembly electoral for the district is as below:

- PS-35 (Naushahro Feroze city, Mithiani, Abran, Bhorti)
- PS-34 (Tharushah, Bhirya, Darbelo)
- PS-33 (Halani, Kandiaro, Mehrabpur)

decreased one seat in census 2017

- PS-36 (Moro, New Jatoi, Dars)

=== Local governments (tehsils of district) ===
- Moro
- Naushahro Feroze
- Bhiria
- Kandiaro
- Mehrabpur

Administrative unit	Number of Kanungo circles/ Supervisory uapas	Number of mouzas Circles/Ttpas	Total	Rural	Urban	Partly Urban	Forest	Unpopulated	Population
Naushahro Feroze	3	21	60	51	01	07	--	01	372,821
Bhiria	2	17	33	21	01	10	--	01	301,044
Moro	4	26	53	47	--	02	03	01	368,789
Kandiaro	3	17	53	46	--	03	04	01	322,439
Mehrabpur	2	16	34	29	--	05	--	--	247,280
Total	14	97	233	194	02	27	07	03	1,612,373

== Transportation ==
The main N-5 passes through the district.

The main railway track passes through the district which is not functional for a long time. The route was from Padidan to NF, Moro, Dadu, etc. but it has ended now. Now the main major railway station for the NF peoples is Padidan which is fully functional and having second longest platform in Pakistan with a vast locoshed area. Have major trains stop, Hazara Express, Awami Express, Fareed Express, Pakistan Express and Sukkur Express.

== Demographics ==
Historical population
Year	Pop.	±% p.a.
1951	267,638	—
1961	369,161	+3.27%
1972	685,829	+5.79%
1981	829,051	+2.13%
1998	1,087,571	+1.61%
2017	1,612,047	+2.09%
2023	1,777,082	+1.64%

Religions in Naushahro Feroze district (2023)
Religion	Percent
Islam	98.12%
Hinduism	1.63%
Other or not stated	0.24%

At the time of the 2017 census, Naushahro Feroze district had 275,800 households and a population of 1,612,047. Naushahro Feroze had a sex ratio of 939 females per 1000 males and a literacy rate of 53.83%: 66.22% for males and 40.73% for females. 379,233 (23.52%) lived in urban areas. 500,373 (31.04%) were under 10 years of age. In 2023, the district had 319,938 households and a population of 1,777,082.

Religion in contemporary Naushahro Feroze District
Religious group	1941		2017		2023	
Religious group	Pop.	%	Pop.	%	Pop.	%
Islam	215,727	81.77%	1,584,641	98.30%	1,743,003	98.12%
Hinduism	46,243	17.53%	26,464	1.64%	28,978	1.63%
Sikhism	1,819	0.69%	—N/a	—N/a	15	0%
Others (Note: Including Jainism, Christianity, Buddhism, Zoroastrianism, Judaism, Ad-Dharmis, or not stated)	32	0.01%	942	0.06%	4,463	0.24%
Total Population	263,821	100%	1,612,047	100%	1,776,459	100%
Note: 1941 census data is Kandiaro, Moro and Naushahro Feroze talukas of Nawabshah District, which roughly corresponds to contemporary Naushahro Feroze District. District and taluk borders have changed since 1995, namely the splitting of Moro taluk and its division between two districts.

The majority religion is Islam, with 98.12% of the population. Hinduism (including those from Scheduled Castes) is practiced by 1.63% of the population.

Languages of Naushahro Feroze district (2023)
1. Sindhi (92.1%)
2. Urdu (3.98%)
3. Punjabi (2.13%)
4. Others (1.76%)

At the time of the 2023 census, 92.13% of the population spoke Sindhi, 3.98% Urdu and 2.13% Punjabi as their first language.

== List of Dehs ==
The following is a list of Naushahro Feroze District's Dehs, organised by Tehsils:

- Naushahro Feroze Tehsil (58 Dehs)
  - Wagan,
  - Agham
  - Arban
  - Batil
  - Bhanbhri
  - Bhurnd
  - Bookar
  - Chanari
  - Changal
  - Cheeho
  - Dall
  - Dangeja
  - Dhori Bachal
  - Gejh No. 1
  - Gejh No. 2
  - Ghanghro
  - Izzat Waggan
  - Jarri
  - Jiskani
  - Kajhar
  - Kalooro
  - Kalro
  - Kanghal
  - Keti Abu Bakar No. 1
  - Keti Abu Bakar No. 2
  - Khariro
  - Khuhawar No. 1
  - Khuhawar No. 2
  - Khuhi Jalal
  - Koor Gahno
  - Koor Hassan
  - Loothi
  - Masur Ji Wai
  - Menghlo
  - Miranpur
  - Mithiani No. 1
  - Mithiani No. 2
  - Mubejani
  - Nathar Detha
  - Naushahro
  - Noor Pur
  - Paddidan
  - Panjo
  - Parya
  - Phull
  - Pir Parto
  - Sahib Khan
  - Seengarchi
  - Serhal
  - Sher Khan
  - Shuja Muhammad
  - Tetri
  - Thatt No. 1
  - Thatt No. 2
  - Veesar
  - Wagan
  - Wassan
  - Wassayo
- Moro Tehsil (53 Dehs)
  - Abad Kahkot
  - Belo Khero Dero
  - Belo Lalia
  - Bet Budho
  - Bhambhro Dero
  - Borarai
  - Chando
  - Chaneja
  - Dalchand
  - Daris
  - Deparja
  - Dheeran Jagir
  - Dilo Shah
  - Doro Behan
  - Dumber Ji Wai
  - Fareed Dero
  - Fato Balal
  - Fazil Jagir
  - Ganghan Jagir
  - Ghairabad Kahkot
  - Gharho
  - Junalo
  - Kacho Koheri
  - Kalhora
  - Karap
  - Kareja
  - Karocho
  - Kenchi Jagir
  - Khair Wah
  - Khaliso
  - Khero Dero
  - Khokhar
  - Korai
  - Kot Satabo
  - Lalia
  - Lett
  - Lundki
  - Malkani
  - Manaheen
  - Mari
  - Jatoi
  - Misri
  - Moro
  - Gachero
  - Qaim Koor
  - Sadhuja
  - Saleh Pur
  - Sehra
  - Sultan Beghan
  - Wad Pagia
  - Waryaso Jagir
  - Waryaso Rayati
  - Kahkat
- Mehrabpur Tehsil (34 Union councils)
  - Bago Daro
  - Behlani
  - Bhorgi
  - Chibhar Babhan
  - Deengaro
  - Dehat
  - Dewan
  - Dodha
  - Godho Hindu
  - Halani
  - Hote Khan Jalbani
  - Kotri Kabeer
  - Langarji
  - Mad Ibyani
  - Mehar Haji
  - Mehrabpur 01
  - Mehrabpur 02
  - Moule Dino Haji
  - Natho Rajper
  - Nau-Abad
  - Peer Waito
  - Punjaban
  - Qaisar Mari
  - Rajo Dahri
  - Saeed Pur
  - Saleh Sahito
  - Sangi
  - Sittar Dino Mangrio
  - Syed Shuja
  - Tuttah
  - Vighia Mal
- Kandiaro Tehsil (52 Dehs)
  - Abad-111
  - Bahri-1
  - Bahri-2
  - Bazidpur
  - Beelo Kamaldero
  - Bello Mohbatdero
  - Dello Sumita
  - Belo Bhounar
  - Bhagodero-1
  - Bhagodero-2
  - Bhority
  - Budak
  - Chachak
  - Dabhro
  - Darbelo new
  - Darbelo old
  - Detha
  - Ghanghra
  - Ghulam Shah
  - Gul Shah
  - Haji Shah
  - Jea Pota
  - Kalatagar-1
  - Kalatagar-2
  - Kamaldero-1
  - Kamaldero-2
  - Kandhar
  - Kandiaro
  - Khairodero
  - Khanwahan
  - Kouro Khushik
  - Ladho Bisharat
  - Lakha road
  - Larik
  - Lundi
  - Machi
  - Mahessar
  - Manjuth
  - Mirzapur
  - Mohbatdero Jagir
  - Mohbatdero Siyal
  - Moria
  - Mosodero
  - Pirmard
  - Sahita
  - Salehpur
  - Samita
  - Sethar
  - Shah Mirdero
  - Shanikhani
  - Sona Bindi
  - Thatt Moosa
- Bhiria Tehsil (32 Dehs)
  - Baran
  - Bella Wah
  - Bhiria
  - Bhiro
  - Burira
  - Chaheen Manomal
  - Chakar Wah
  - Dali
  - Dalipota
  - Dheengaro
  - Dingaro
  - Ghan gujo
  - Jalbani
  - Kajar
  - Kandir
  - Khah Jagir
  - Khahi Mamon
  - Khahi Qasim
  - Khahi Rahu
  - Kot Bahadur
  - Ladho Rano
  - Machur
  - Madd Aleem
  - Mango
  - Molhan Jagir
  - Molhan Rayati
  - Palano
  - Panhwari
  - Pano Usman
  - Rajo Keerio
  - Soondhan
  - Tharushah

== Bibliography ==
- 1998 District census report of Naushahro Firoze. Census publication. Vol. 92. Islamabad: Population Census Organization, Statistics Division, Government of Pakistan. 2000.
