= Toba Achakzai =

Mountains in Balochistan Pakistan

- Khwaja Amran
- Location within Pakistan

Highest point
- Elevation: 1,949 m (6,394 ft)
- Coordinates: 30°35′N 66°25′E

Naming
- Native name: توبه اڅکزۍ (Pashto)

Geography
- Location: Killa Abdullah District, Balochistan, Pakistan
- Parent range: Toba Kakar

The Toba Achakzai (Pashto: توبه اڅکزۍ) or Khwaja Amran is an offshoot of the Toba Kakar range of mountains, north of Chaman, in Balochistan, Pakistan, extending into Maruf District in Kandahar Province, Afghanistan. It is crossed by N-25 National Highway and Rohri–Chaman Railway Line that passes through the Khojak railway tunnel. The grave of Khwaja Amran Baba is located at the peak.

The area is located within the heartland of the Achakzai tribe of Durrani Pashtuns. Ahmad Shah Durrani, the founder of Afghanistan, used to pass some of the hot weeks in summer in the pleasant weather of Toba Achakzai.

== See also ==
- Khojak Pass
- Toba Kakar
- List of mountains in Pakistan
