= 2017 Afghanistan–Pakistan border skirmish =

Border skirmishes between Afghanistan and Pakistan

- Part of the Afghanistan–Pakistan skirmishes
Date	5 May 2017
Location	Chaman, Balochistan, Pakistan 30.907255°N 66.450959°E
Result	Pakistan closes the border for the second time in 2017.

Belligerents
Pakistan	Afghanistan

Units involved
Pakistan Army; Frontier Corps	Afghan National Army; Afghan Border Police

Casualties and losses
2 killed, 9 wounded (Pakistani claim); 9 killed and 40 wounded (Afghan claim)	50+ killed, 100+ wounded (Pakistani claim); Five checkpoints destroyed (Pakistani claim)
- 9 civilians killed, 42 wounded (Pakistani claim); 2 civilians killed, 30 wounded (Afghan claim)
- Location within Balochistan and Pakistan Chaman (Balochistan, Pakistan)

On 5 May 2017, an armed skirmish occurred after Afghan forces attacked a Pakistani census team in Chaman, in Pakistan near the border with Afghanistan. At least 15 people died on both sides in the immediate border clash. It is one of a series of similar border-related incidents between the two countries.

== Background ==
In February 2017, Pakistan closed the border crossings at Torkham and Chaman due to security reasons following the Sehwan suicide bombing. Hours after the blast, the Pakistan Army reportedly launched "strikes" on militant bases in Nangarhar, Afghanistan. In March, 32 days after it was closed, Pakistani Prime Minister Nawaz Sharif ordered the reopening of the Afghanistan–Pakistan border as a "goodwill gesture". Subsequently, the Pakistani government decided to fence selected parts of the country's border with Afghanistan. On 5 April, an Afghan Foreign Ministry spokesman said Kabul might resort to military action if diplomacy failed to resolve the border fencing issue.

The Afghanistan–Pakistan border, known as the Durand Line, runs through the Pashtun ethnic homeland, dividing the region between the two countries. Historically, the Afghan government has disputed the border and resisted attempts at border control or fencing, straining ties between both nations. The Afghan foreign ministry claimed it had also "warned" Pakistan not to conduct its census in the villages near the border area.

== Incident ==
=== Pakistani claim ===
On 5 May, a Pakistani census team that was collecting population data was attacked by Afghan forces. Pakistani officials said that the fighting began after Afghan security forces fired on the census workers and the F.C. paramilitary troops escorting them. The team was present near the village of Luqman located in Spin Boldak and Killi Jahangir villages near the border on the Pakistani side. According to Pakistan, the Afghan Border Police had been notified of the ongoing census activities in advance, but the Afghan forces began creating hurdles for them since 30 April.

In return, Pakistani forces attacked the Afghan forces. On Pakistan's side, the Afghan troops firing killed nine people, including three women and five children, while 40 others were wounded. The Pakistani troops' firing targeted Afghan security personnel and 50+ border guards were killed while 100+ Afghan security forces, were injured and at least 1 was captured. It also said that two Pakistani soldiers were also killed and another nine were wounded. Furthermore, the military said Afghanistan requested a ceasefire which Pakistan accepted.

=== Afghan claim ===
Samim Khaplwak, an Afghan spokesman for the governor of Kandahar, claimed that the Pakistani census team had strayed into Afghanistan. An Afghan foreign ministry spokesman claimed the villages were located in Spin Boldak District on their side of the Durand Line disputed by Afghanistan, identifying them as Luqman and Haji Nazar. He said the Afghan forces fired upon the Pakistani personnel.

An Afghan government spokesman said they "totally rejected" the casualty figures by Pakistan as "very false". Afghanistan's envoy to Pakistan Omar Zakhilwal said that only two Afghan soldiers were killed and seven injured. He asserted: "The Chaman clash left casualties, deaths and injured on Pakistan side too but we, instead of celebrating, called it unfortunate and regrettable."

== Reaction ==
A spokesman for Kandahar police told Reuters that the Pakistani team were using the census as cover for "malicious activities and to provoke villagers against the government".

The Inspector-General of Pakistan's Frontier Corps, Major-General Nadeem Ahmed, said that Afghan forces had intruded into Pakistani territory and taken positions by occupying houses there. He said the Afghans had targeted civilian populations and used villagers as human shields, but they retreated from their positions after Pakistani forces launched an assault. He also added that Pakistan's international border was "non-negotiable and no compromise will be made on it", and that the Afghan aggression was a result of their government's collusion with India.

The commander of Pakistan Army's Southern Command, Lieutenant-General Aamer Riaz, called the Afghan offensive "foolish" and said Pakistan would respond to such attacks with "full might". In an interview with Radio Pakistan, he commented: "Such attacks won’t benefit Afghanistan in any way and its government should be ashamed of these imprudent actions." He said the Chaman border would remain closed until "Afghanistan changes its behaviour."

Pakistan's Defence Minister Khawaja Muhammad Asif stated if Pakistan's borders were "violated and further destruction occurs, then those responsible will have to pay the price. We will avenge those who cause us destruction." He said Afghanistan had realised it was "at fault", and that Pakistan expected to resolve the matter but it did not receive a "positive response". He also called on the Afghan government to end terrorism.

== Aftermath ==
The Wesh–Chaman border crossing was closed as a result of the skirmish. The border closure resulted in the suspension of the repatriation of Afghan refugees. On 8 May, the census activities halted in urban areas of Chaman resumed. On 12 May, the border crossing was partially reopened for the women, children and sick people. The area is inhabited by Achakzai tribespeople on both sides of the border. Following the skirmish, civilians on both sides were evacuated to safer locations. In Quetta, a group of protesters staged a demonstration outside the Afghan consulate condemning the Afghan forces.

Following a series of flag meetings, both sides started negotiations. It was agreed that a joint geological (sic) or geodetic survey would be carried out to demarcate the border area, and that Google Maps would be considered for this purpose. According to Dawn, the Pakistani side "made it clear" to the Afghans that the two villages affected by the incident belonged to Pakistan's side of the border. On 11 May, the completed survey reports were sent to the governments of both countries. On 27 May, Pakistan said it opened the border on "humanitarian grounds" after a request from Afghan authorities, following the start of Ramadan. This marked the end of a closure lasting 22 days.

== See also ==
- Wesh–Chaman border crossing
- Afghanistan-Pakistan relations
