= Killa Abdullah Tehsil =

Administrative subdivision (Tehsil) of Killa Abdullah District, Pakistan

Killa Abdullah Tehsil تحصیل قلعہ عبد اللہ
- Tehsil
- Interactive map of Killa Abdullah Tehsil
- Coordinates: 30°43′44″N 66°39′41″E
- Country: Pakistan
- Province: Balochistan
- District: Killa Abdullah District
- Headquarters: Killa Abdullah

Government
  - Type: Tehsil Municipal Administration

Population (2023)
  - Total: 149,915
- Time zone: UTC+5 (PST)

Killa Abdullah Tehsil (Pashto: قلعہ عبد اللہ تحصیل) is an administrative subdivision (tehsil) of Killa Abdullah District in the Balochistan province of Pakistan. The tehsil is headquartered at the town of Killa Abdullah.

== History ==
The tehsil is named after Sardar Abdullah Khan Achakzai, a prominent leader in the First Anglo-Afghan War, who constructed a fort (Killa) in the region during the 19th century. Historically part of the Pishin District, Killa Abdullah was established as a separate district in June 1993, with Killa Abdullah serving as one of its primary tehsils.

== Geography ==
The tehsil is characterized by mountainous terrain, situated in the foothills of the Shela Bagh mountain range. The elevation averages approximately 1,500 metres (4,900 ft) above sea level. The climate is semi-arid, with hot, dry summers and cold, often snowy winters.

== Demographics ==
As of the 2023 Census of Pakistan, Killa Abdullah Tehsil has a population of 149,915. The population is predominantly Pashtun, with the Achakzai and Kakar being the major tribes. Pashto is the primary language spoken by over 97% of the inhabitants.

== Administration ==
The tehsil is divided into several Union Councils. It is managed by a Tehsil Municipal Administration (TMA) responsible for local infrastructure and services. The following Union Councils are located within the tehsil:

- Abdul Rehmanzai
- Darozai
- Killa Abdullah (Urban)
- (Other regional councils)

== Economy ==
Agriculture is the mainstay of the economy, particularly horticulture. The area is famous for its production of fruits, including grapes, apples, and apricots. Livestock farming is also a significant source of livelihood for the rural population.
