= Khojak Pass =

- Kojack Pass
- Interactive map of Khojak Pass
- Elevation: 2,290 metres (7,510 ft)
- Traversed by: N-25 National Highway Rohri–Chaman Railway Line

Third Approach
- Location: Pakistan
- Range: Toba Achakzai
- Coordinates: 30°50′8.68″N 66°34′53.42″E

External image
- Photo at Flickr

Khojak Pass (el. 7,513 ft [2,290 m]) is a mountain pass connecting Qila Abdullah with Chaman in the province of Baluchistan, Pakistan. The road through the Toba Achakzai range connects the larger cities of Quetta, Pakistan, and Kandahar, Afghanistan.

- Khojak railroad tunnel 3.9 km (2.4 mi) long; pictured on the old five rupees note.

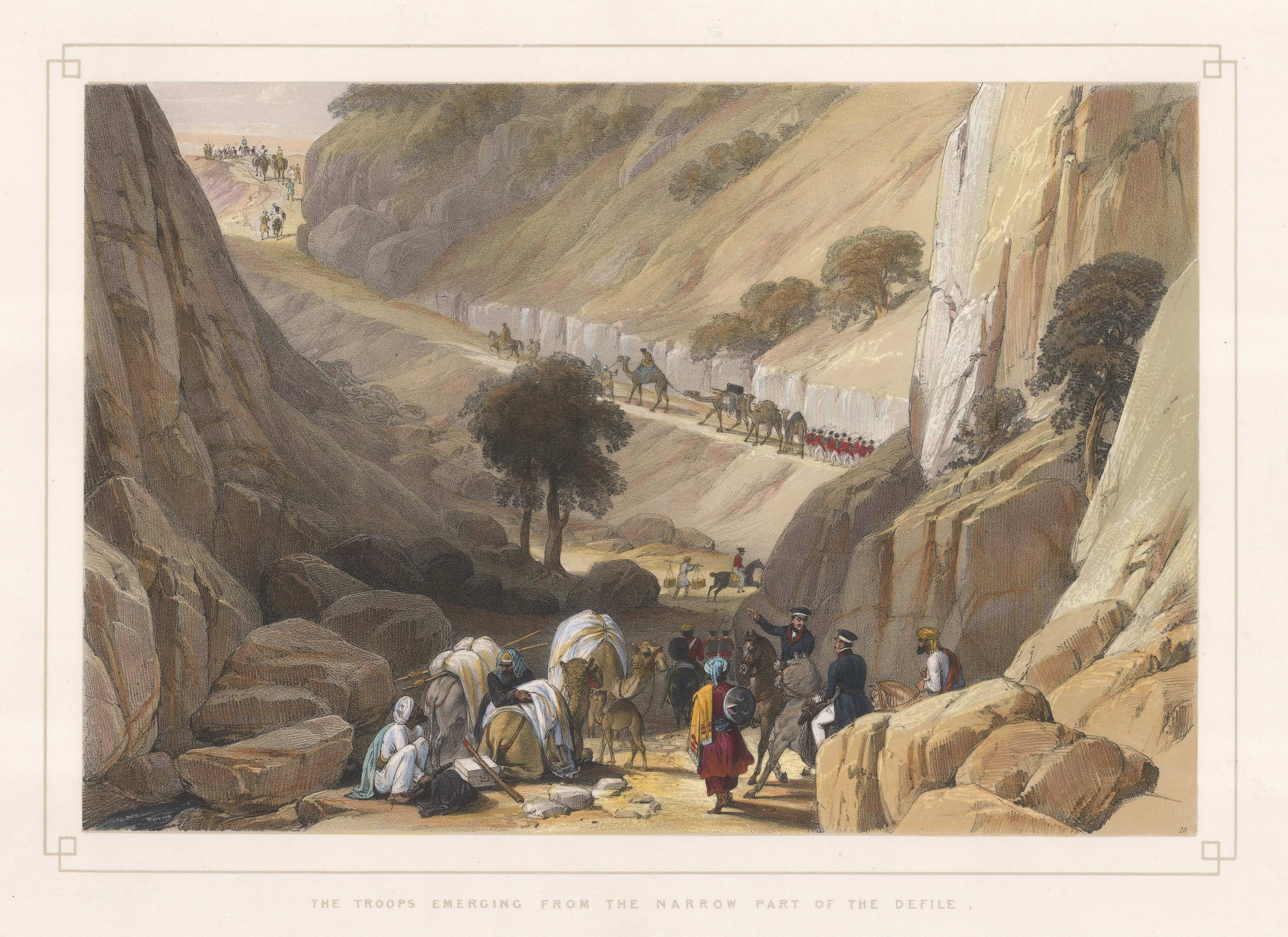
The Khojak Pass ca. 1840, James Atkinson

- Small forts defend the pass on each hill top.
- "Historically, the Achakzai, across the Khojak Mountains, have controlled the smuggling routes around the Khojak Pass, one of the two major mountain passes that connect the Middle East with the Indian subcontinent, the other being the more famous" Khyber Pass.

== Notes ==
- Encyclopedia of Pakistan by Zahid Hussain Anjum. Jahangir Book Depot, Pakistan (2005–06)
