= Wesh =

Wesh or WESH may refer to:

- Wesh in Spin Boldak, Kandahar province, Afghanistan
- Wesh–Chaman border crossing one of the major international border crossings between Afghanistan and Pakistan
- Darrell Wesh (1992), Haitian-American sprinter
- Marlena Wesh (1991), Haitian-American sprinter
- Wesh, French-language song by Mokobé and Gradur, in 2015
- WESH, television station serving Orlando, Florida
