= Operation Mongoose (2003) =

American operation part of the war in Afghanistan

- Part of the War in Afghanistan (2001–2021) (Operation Enduring Freedom)
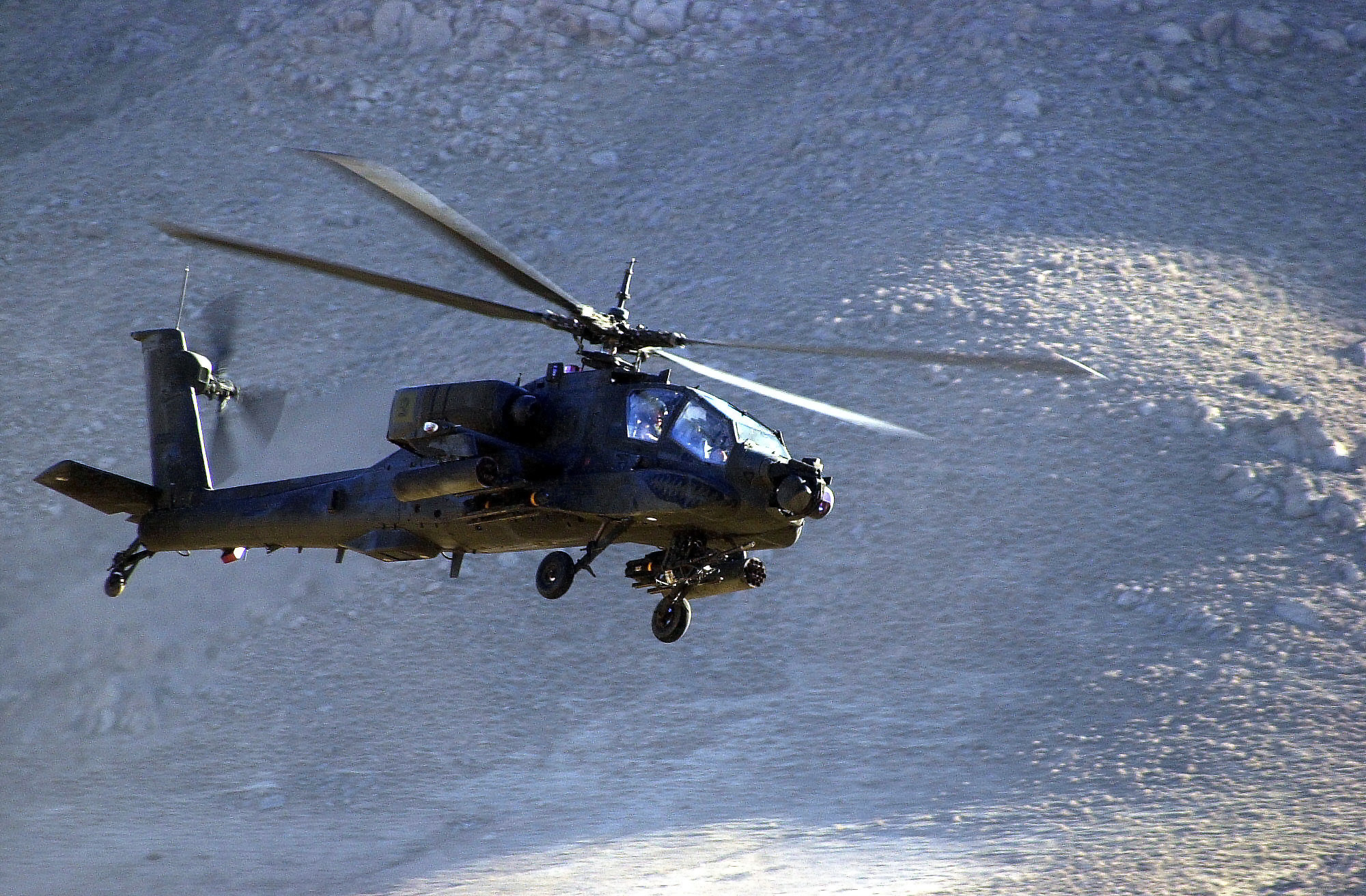
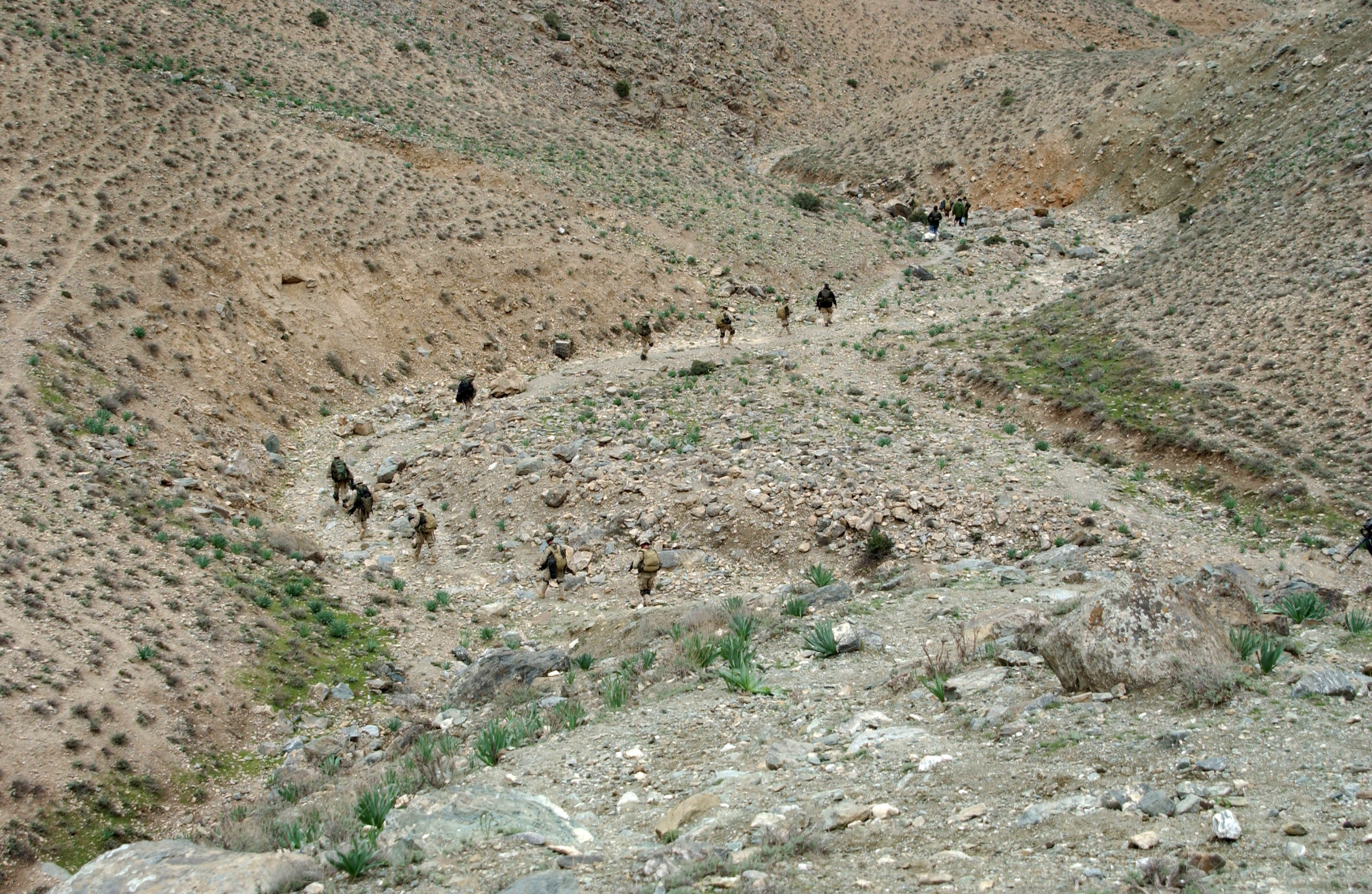
- Top: AH-64 Apache attack helicopter called in to destroy a suspected Taliban weapons cache Bottom: Soldiers of the 82nd Airborne Division on a search and destroy mission in the Adi Ghar Mountains
Date	27 or 28 January – 10 or 11 February 2003 (possibly longer) (two weeks)
Location	Adi Ghar Mountains, Spin Boldak District, Kandahar Province, Afghanistan
Result	ISAF victory: Over 75 caves cleared

Belligerents
ISAF; United States; Norway; Transitional Islamic State of Afghanistan	Hezb-e Islami Gulbuddin; Taliban al-Qaeda

Commanders and leaders
Lt. Col. Charlie Flynn	Gulbuddin Hekmatyar

Units involved
United States Armed Forces; Special Forces; 82nd Airborne Division; 307th Engineer Battalion; 504th Infantry Regiment; 2nd Battalion 505th Infantry Regiment; (United States Air Force) US Air Force; (Norway) RNoAF	Insurgent militias

Strength
300–350 soldiers (Afghanistan) Militia fighters (United States) B-1 bombers AC-130 Spectre gunships AH-64 Apache attack helicopters CH-47 Chinook helicopters (Norway) F-16s	80 fighters (coalition estimate)

Casualties and losses
None	22 killed, 13 captured (per coalition); 18 reported killed during the Battle in the Adi Ghar Mountains

Operation Mongoose was an American-led two week cave clearing operation in the Adi Ghar Mountains near the town of Spin Boldak in Kandahar Province, Afghanistan. Launched on the 28 January 2003, over 350 US and coalition soldiers along with Afghan militia fighters, assisted by Apache helicopters and Norwegian F-16 fighter jets participated with the objective of searching through and destroying caves used by Hezb-e Islami, Taliban and al-Qaeda operatives. By the end of the operation, over 75 caves had been cleared.

== Battle in the Adi Ghar Mountains ==
On the 27 January, a patrol of US Special Forces accompanied by Afghan militia fighters came under small arms fire while clearing a compound approximately 13 kilometers north of Spin Boldak at 11:00 am. The US and Afghan forces returned fire; after the small skirmish, one enemy was dead, another wounded, and a third was captured. After interrogation, the captured fighter claimed that 80 fighters were hiding in the Adi Ghar Mountains. Wanting to verify these claims, the US Special Forces dispatched two Apache helicopters. It took them 26 minutes to reach the area, and upon receiving fire the Apaches called for assistance from B-1B bombers, AC-130 Spectre gunships and Norwegian F-16s, making it the first time the Norwegian Air Force had seen combat since World War II. On the ground, a joint force of at least 350, including US soldiers from the 82nd Airborne Division and Special Forces, alongside coalition and Afghan militia troops were called to the area to participate in the operation. The fighting lasted into the next day with the battle ending about 12 hours after the initial engagement. US and Norwegian aircraft dropped 19 2,000 pound bombs and two guided 500 pound bombs. At least 18 fighters loyal to Gulbuddin Hekmatyar were reported killed with no coalition casualties. The battle was described as the largest since Operation Anaconda.
