= Khanozai Khushab =

Village in Pishin District, Pakistan

Khanozai Khushab is a village in Pishin District, tehsil Karezat, Pakistan. It is almost 70 kilometres (43 mi) east the capital city of Balochistan, Quetta and about 8 kilometres (5.0 mi) away from the small city of Khanozai.
