= Qilla Abdullah railway station =

Railway station in Pakistan

Qilla Abdullah Station قلعہ عبداللہ ریلوے اسٹیشن

General information
- Location: Qilla Abdullah, Qilla Abdullah district, Balochistan; Pakistan
- Coordinates: 30.73456°N 66.65236°E
- Owner: Ministry of Railways
- Line: Rohri-Chaman Railway Line

Other information
- Station code: KAB

Services
Preceding station	Pakistan Railways	Following station
Gulistan towards Rohri Junction	Rohri–Chaman Line	Shela Bagh towards Chaman
Location
- Location within Balochistan, Pakistan Location within Pakistan

Qilla Abdullah railway station (Urdu: قلعہ عبداللہ ریلوے اسٹیشن, Balochi: قلعہ عبداللہ ریلوے اسٹیشن) is a railway station located in Qilla Abdullah town, Qilla Abdullah district of Balochistan province of the Pakistan.

== History ==
Qilla Abdullah railway station was established during the British colonial era.

Until 2019, Pakistan Railways maintained daily train services at the station, which served as a transit point for the region. These services facilitated the transport of goods to Chaman and Quetta, contributing to local trade and economic activity.

As of 2024, train services have been reduced to once or twice per week. This reduction has impacted the local economy. The station's infrastructure has deteriorated, with damage to equipment noted. Railway station staff are primarily present only when trains are scheduled to operate.

== See also ==
- List of railway stations in Pakistan
- Pakistan Railways
