= 2024 Chaman protest =

Protest in Chaman, Pakistan

2024 Chaman Protest
- Date: 2024
- Location: Chaman, Balochistan, Pakistan
- Caused by: Strict visa policies at the Afghan border, perceived inadequate security arrangements
- Methods: Sit-in, protest, clashes with law enforcement
- Result: Increased security measures, opening of the Badini border crossing for trade with Afghanistan

Parties
Local 'lighris', protesters	Law enforcement agencies

Casualties
- Death: unknown
- Injuries: Over three dozen, including 16 policemen

The 2024 Chaman Protest was a significant event that took place in the Chaman district of Balochistan, Pakistan. The protest was mainly against the government's strict visa policies at the Afghan border. The protest escalated into violence, resulting in numerous injuries and disruptions across the border town.

== Background ==
The protests were initiated by local 'Laghris' who were protesting against the strict visa system and what they considered inadequate security measures. The government's decision to allow only those with valid passports and visas to cross the Chaman border sparked protests. Earlier, Pakistani and Afghan citizens could cross the border by showing their identity cards.

== The protest ==
Unrest spread across the border city, with protesters holding rallies and demonstrations, effectively shutting down the city. Clashes erupted when protesters tried to block major roads, including the national highway connecting Quetta to Kandahar. The commotion took place outside the Deputy Commissioner's office and the Frontier Corps fort.

=== Clashs ===
The situation escalated when protesters started attacking government buildings and installations demanding immediate release. More than three dozen people, including 16 police personnel, were injured in the violent clashes. As a result of the violence, seven seriously injured persons were admitted to the trauma center of Quetta Civil Hospital for further treatment.

== Aftermath ==
Following the escalation of tension, emergency was imposed at the hospital to ensure immediate medical assistance to the injured. Due to tight security arrangements in Chaman, the situation remained tense. The matter was raised in the National Assembly when the opposition PTI-Sunni Ittehad Council (SIC) and JUI-F demanded an end to the problems faced by travelers crossing the Pakistan-Afghanistan border at Chaman.
