= Maruf, Afghanistan =

Town in Kandahar Province, Afghanistan

Maruf Maroof
- Location in kandahar Afghanistan
- Coordinates: 31°39′N 67°11′E
- Country: Afghanistan
- Province: Kandahar
- District: Maruf
- Elevation: 6,585 ft (2,007 m)
- Time zone: UTC+4:30

The town of Maruf (Pashto: معروف) is the district center of Maruf District, Kandahar Province, Afghanistan. It is located in the Toba Achakzai mountains at 2,007 metres (6,584.6 ft). It is the place where Ahmad Shah Durrani, the founder of Afghanistan, lived his last days and died on 16 October 1772.

== Climate ==
Maruf has a humid continental climate (Köppen: Dsa) with hot, dry summers and moderately cold winters.

Climate data for Maruf
Month	Jan	Feb	Mar	Apr	May	Jun	Jul	Aug	Sep	Oct	Nov	Dec	Year
Daily mean °C (°F)	−1.3 (29.7)	2.1 (35.8)	8.4 (47.1)	14.1 (57.4)	20.56 (69.01)	24.2 (75.6)	26.0 (78.8)	24.5 (76.1)	20.56 (69.01)	13.8 (56.8)	5.56 (42.01)	2.8 (37.0)	13.44 (56.19)
Average precipitation mm (inches)	55.2 (2.17)	92.7 (3.65)	64.9 (2.56)	35.8 (1.41)	11.1 (0.44)	0.4 (0.02)	4.3 (0.17)	3.8 (0.15)	1.9 (0.07)	1.5 (0.06)	24.8 (0.98)	16.1 (0.63)	312.5 (12.31)
Average relative humidity (%)	48	52	38	28	18	12	16	16	14	21	36	37	28
Source 1: ClimateCharts
Source 2: World Weather Online (precipitation & humidity)
