= Shela Bagh =

- Location within Pakistan
- Coordinates: 30.831979°N 66.589562°E
- Country: Pakistan
- Region: Balochistan
- District: Qilla Abdullah District
- Elevation: 2,044 m (6,706 ft)
- Time zone: UTC+5 (PST)

Shela Bagh (Also spelled Shelabagh) is a town in Qila Abdullah district of Balochistan province of the Pakistan. It is located next to Shelabagh Cantonment on Quetta-Chaman Highway (N-25).

This town is famous for its railway station and gateway of the Khojak tunnel also known as Shela Bagh tunnel.

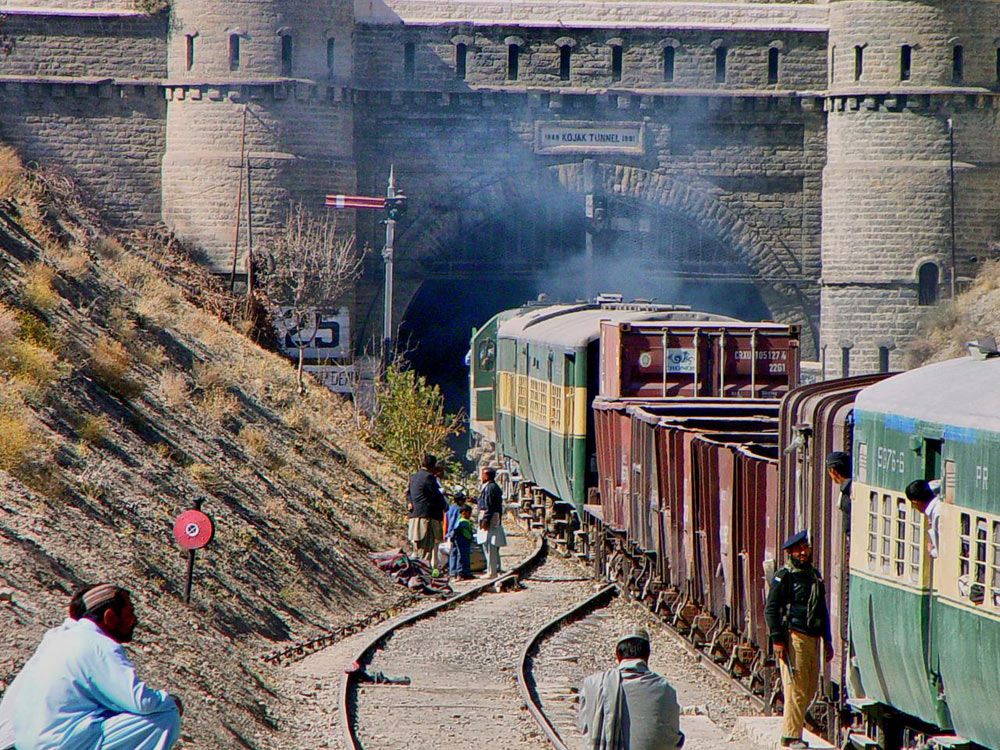
Khojak Tunnel gateway at Shela Bagh
