= CDZ =

CDZ, CdZ, or cdz may refer to:

- CdZ, Chief of Civil Administration (German: Chef der Zivilverwaltung), civil administrative division in Nazi Germany
- CDZ, Toronto Stock Exchange code for Claymore CDN Dividend & Income Achievers ETF
- Chidarzai railway station (station code CDZ), Pakistan
- Convergence-divergence zone, a theory to explain the neural mechanisms of memory and recollection
- Controlled Drinking Zone, an area in London where police officers can require a person to stop drinking
- Koda language (ISO 639-3 Language code cdz) native to India and Bangladesh
- Neo Geo CDZ, a video game console
