= Laleji railway station =

Railway station in Pakistan

General information
- Owner: Ministry of Railways
- Line: Rohri–Chaman Railway Line

Other information
- Station code: LJI

Laleji railway station (Urdu: لالیجی ریلوے اسٹیشن) is located in Pakistan.

== See also ==
- List of railway stations in Pakistan
- Pakistan Railways
