= Lamaran Pishin =

Village in Pishin District, Pakistan

Lamaran is a village in Pishin District, Pakistan.
