= Toba Kakar =

Mountain range in Balochistan, Pakistan

Coordinates: 31°15′N 68°00′E

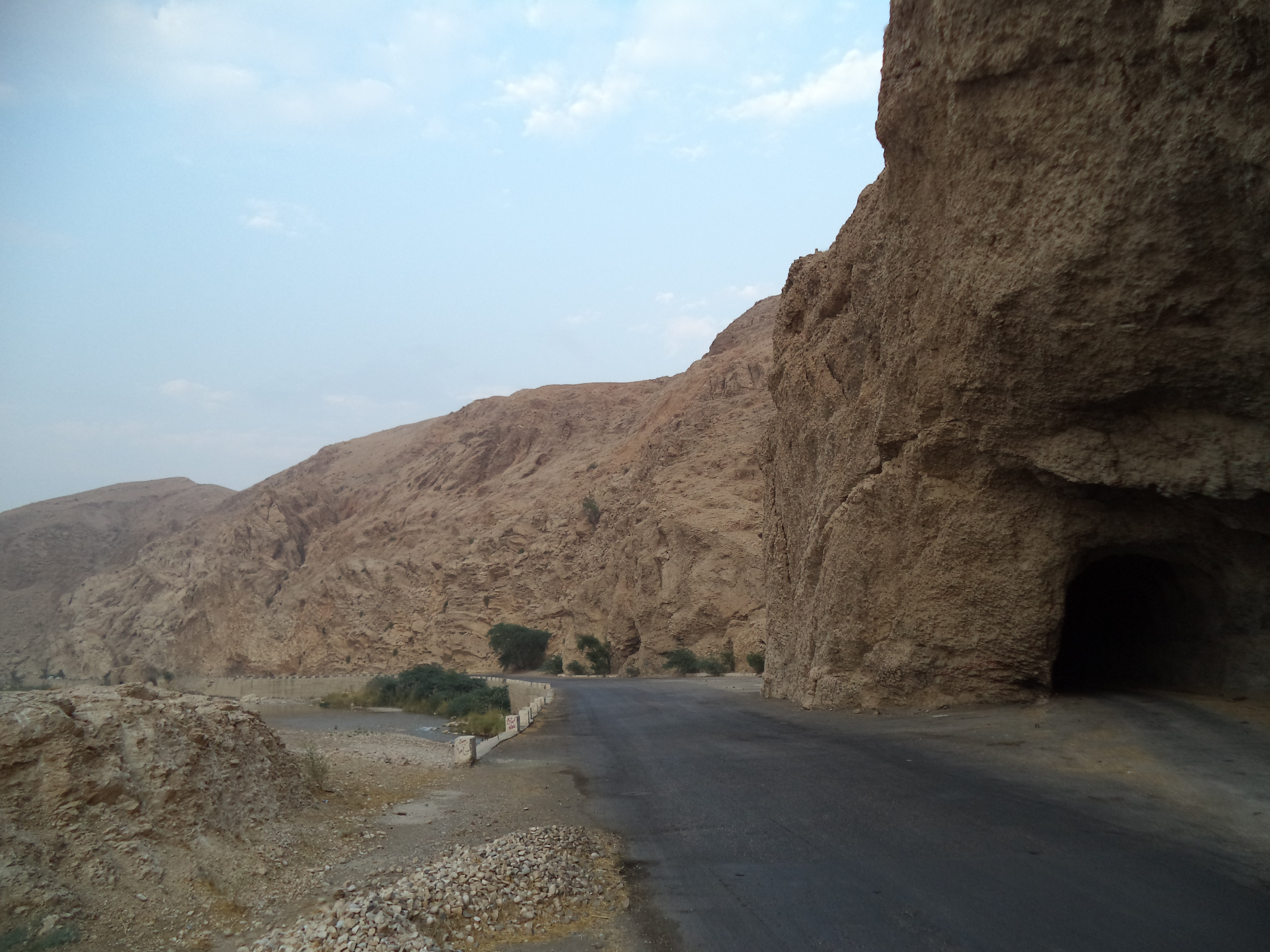
Bolan Pass in the Toba Kakar range

The Toba Kakar or Toba Kakari (Pashto: توبه کاکړۍ; Urdu: توبہ کاکڑ) are a southern offshoot of the Sulaiman Mountains in the Balochistan province of Pakistan, extending into the Kandahar and Zabul provinces of Afghanistan. The historical route through the mountains is known as the Bolan Pass. The mountains originally received media attention in August 1979; when evidence emerged that Pakistan may be using them as a potential workspace towards development of nuclear weapons. It was an occasional hideout for the Taliban during the Afghanistan conflict.

A western offshoot of the range in Killa Abdullah, Balochistan and Maruf District, Afghanistan is called the Toba Achakzai, where Ahmad Shah Durrani, the founder of Afghanistan, used to pass some of the hot weeks in summer during the last few years of his life.

== See also ==
- Mountain ranges of the Himalayas
- Mountain ranges of Pakistan
