= Nida Qila =

Nida Qila Pishin
- Location within Pakistan
- Coordinates: 30.44°N 67.09°E
- Country: Pakistan
- Elevation: 1,632 m (5,354 ft)

Population (2017)
  - Estimate: 322
- Time zone: UTC+5 (PST)

Nida Qilla also known as Haji Nida Khan Qilla is a village located in the north eastern Pishin District of Balochistan province, Pakistan.

== Demographics ==
The population of the village, according to 2017 census was 322.
