= Spin Boldak =

City in Kandahar Province, Afghanistan

Spin Boldak سپین بولدک
- City
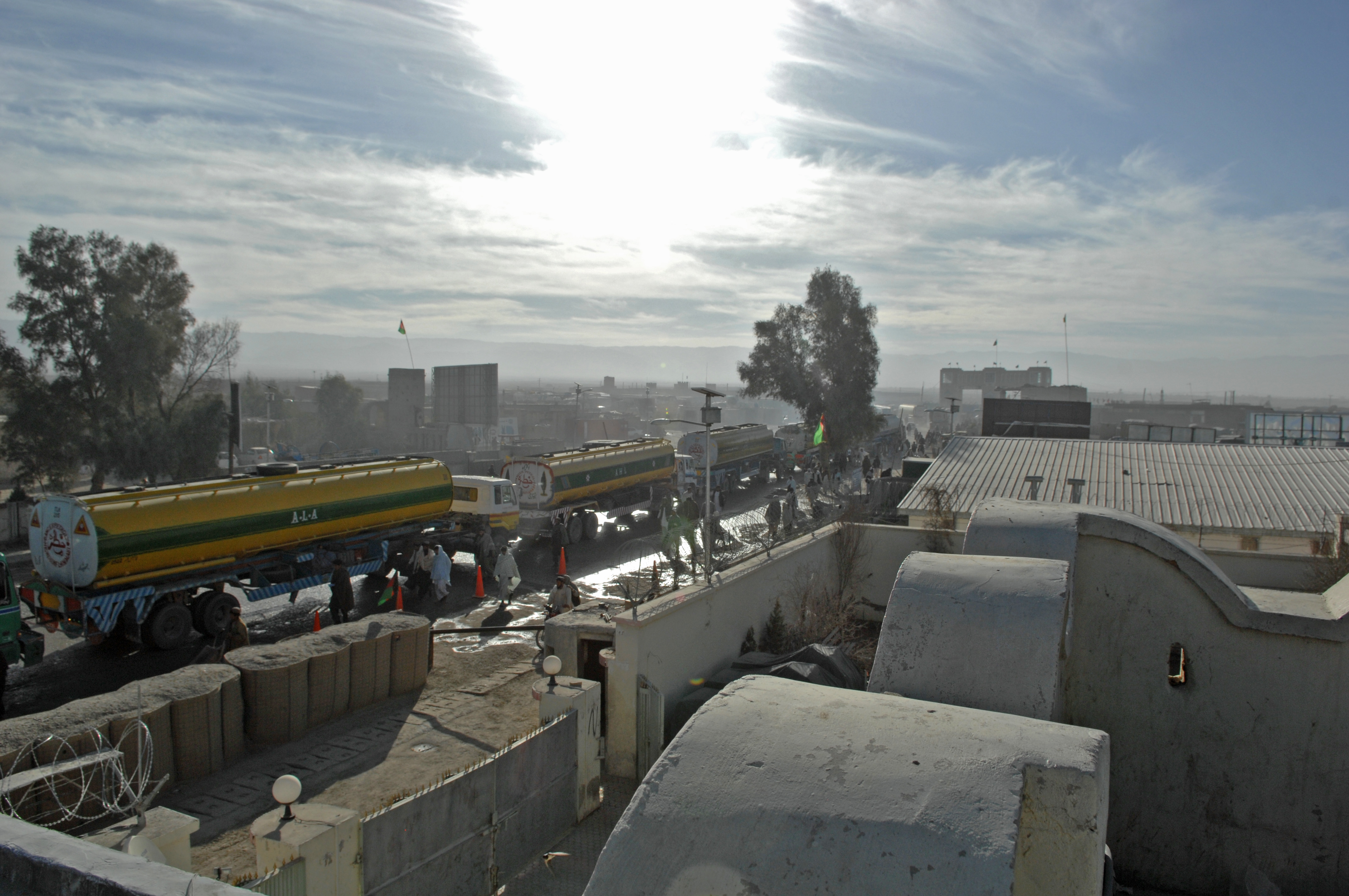
- The Wesh-Chaman border crossing in 2012

- Location in Afghanistan
- Coordinates: 31°0′29″N 66°23′53″E
- Country: Afghanistan
- Province: Kandahar
- District: Spin Boldak

Government
  - Type: Municipality
  - Mayor: Lutfullah Latifi
- Elevation: 4,009 ft (1,222 m)

Population (2025)
  - Total: 123,945
- Time zone: UTC+04:30 (Afghanistan Time)

Spin Boldak (Pashto: سپین بولدک) is a city in Kandahar Province of Afghanistan. It is within the jurisdiction of Spin Boldak District and has an estimated population of 123,945 people. Its current mayor is Lutfullah Latifi.

Spin Boldak sits near the Afghanistan-Pakistan border. It is linked by a highway with the city of Kandahar to the northwest, and with Chaman and Quetta in Pakistan to the southeast. The Wesh-Chaman border crossing is located in the southeast of the city. A new township is being built in Spin Boldak for the Afghans in Pakistan returning to Kandahar.

The area of Spin Boldak and Chaman is populated by ethnic Pashtuns, particularly the Noorzai and Achakzai tribes.

== History ==
The city began to develop after the United States invaded Afghanistan in October 2001. Before that the location was a small border town. In January 2006, "a suicide bomber on a motorbike killed at least 20 people and wounded 20 more," according to one report. "The attacker drove the vehicle into a crowd watching a wrestling match and detonated a bomb," said Kandahar provincial Gov. Asadullah Khalid. The Taliban claimed responsibility for the attack.

Spin Boldak was the site of a suicide bombing in February 2008 that killed 38 Afghans and injured several Canadian soldiers.

In April 2010, three nephews of the former governor of Spin Boldak district, Hajji (or Haji) Fazluddin Agha, aged 15, 13 and 12, were killed in a bomb attack. The bomb was attached to a donkey which was led to the checkpoint in front of the former governor's home and detonated by remote control. Hajji Fazluddin Agha, according to the report, was one of then-President Hamid Karzai's most important political allies in Kandahar, and had also served as Karzai's top campaign official in Kandahar Province. He was unhurt in the bombing, but two bystanders and two policemen were wounded.

On 14 July 2021, Taliban forces as part of the 2021 Taliban offensive captured Spin Boldak along with the border post with Pakistan. The Taliban immediately took over border duties by regulating movement of people and goods between Spin Boldak and the Wesh–Chaman border crossing. It was at this border crossing on 15 July 2021, the Indian photo-journalist Danish Siddiqui was killed by the Taliban and his body mutilated

== Climate ==
With an influence from the local steppe climate, Spin Boldak features a hot semi-arid climate (Köppen BSh), characterised by little precipitation throughout the year. The average temperature in Spin Boldak is 19.7 °C, while the annual precipitation averages 217 mm. July is the hottest month of the year with an average temperature of 31.8 °C. The coldest month January has an average temperature of 6.9 °C.

Climate data for Spin Boldak
| Month | Jan | Feb | Mar | Apr | May | Jun | Jul | Aug | Sep | Oct | Nov | Dec | Year |
|---|---|---|---|---|---|---|---|---|---|---|---|---|---|
| Mean daily maximum °C (°F) | 13.9 (57.0) | 16.7 (62.1) | 22.1 (71.8) | 28.1 (82.6) | 34.6 (94.3) | 39.5 (103.1) | 40.2 (104.4) | 39.1 (102.4) | 35.8 (96.4) | 29.9 (85.8) | 22.8 (73.0) | 17.5 (63.5) | 28.4 (83.0) |
| Daily mean °C (°F) | 6.9 (44.4) | 9.7 (49.5) | 14.6 (58.3) | 20.2 (68.4) | 25.4 (77.7) | 29.8 (85.6) | 31.8 (89.2) | 30.1 (86.2) | 25.5 (77.9) | 19.6 (67.3) | 13.5 (56.3) | 9.2 (48.6) | 19.7 (67.4) |
| Mean daily minimum °C (°F) | 0.0 (32.0) | 2.8 (37.0) | 7.2 (45.0) | 12.3 (54.1) | 16.3 (61.3) | 20.2 (68.4) | 23.4 (74.1) | 21.2 (70.2) | 15.3 (59.5) | 9.4 (48.9) | 4.2 (39.6) | 0.9 (33.6) | 11.1 (52.0) |
Source: Climate-Data.org

== Railway ==
In 1891 the British extended the Indian Railways system (now Pakistan Railways) to the border town of Chaman via the Khojak Tunnel from Qilla Abdullah, from the east and thence south. The rails were not extended into Afghanistan to the north and west for political reasons. Spin Boldak, Afghanistan, is less than 10 km (6.2 mi) from Chaman in Balochistan province of Pakistan.

Over much of the last century, there have been proposals to extend the Chaman line to Afghanistan and possibly beyond, passing through Spin Boldak. These proposals have the support of the current Afghan government. In July 2010, Pakistan and Afghanistan signed a Memorandum of understanding for going ahead with the laying of rail tracks between the two countries.

== See also ==
- List of cities in Afghanistan
