= Wulgai =

Coordinates: 30°30′0″N 67°10′0″E

Wulgai is a village in Pishin District, Balochistan province, Pakistan. It lies on the Wulgai formation - the land containing shale and limestone formations.
