= Lindsay railway station =

Railway station in Pakistan

Coordinates: 29.215°N 67.9233°E

Lindsay Railway Station لنڈسے ریلوے اسٹیشن

General information
- Owner: Ministry of Railways
- Line: Rohri-Chaman Railway Line

Other information
- Station code: LDS

Services
Preceding station	Pakistan Railways	Following station
Damboli towards Rohri Junction	Rohri–Chaman Line	Dingra towards Chaman
Location

Lindsay Railway Station (Urdu: لنڈسے ریلوے اسٹیشن) is located in Pakistan.

== See also ==
- List of railway stations in Pakistan
- Pakistan Railways
