= Bolan railway station =

Railway station in Pakistan

Bolan Railway Station بولان ریلوے اسٹیشن

General information
- Coordinates: 29.5183°N 67.86°E
- Owner: Ministry of Railways
- Line: Rohri-Chaman Railway Line

Other information
- Station code: BJC

Services
Preceding station	Pakistan Railways	Following station
Pehro Kunri towards Rohri Junction	Rohri–Chaman Line	Panir towards Chaman
Location
- Location within Balochistan, Pakistan Location within Pakistan

Bolan Railway Station (Urdu: بولان ریلوے اسٹیشن) is located in Pakistan.

== See also ==
- List of railway stations in Pakistan
- Pakistan Railways
