= Shela Bagh railway station =

Railway station in Pakistan

Shela Bagh Railway Station شیلاباغ ریلوے اسٹیشن
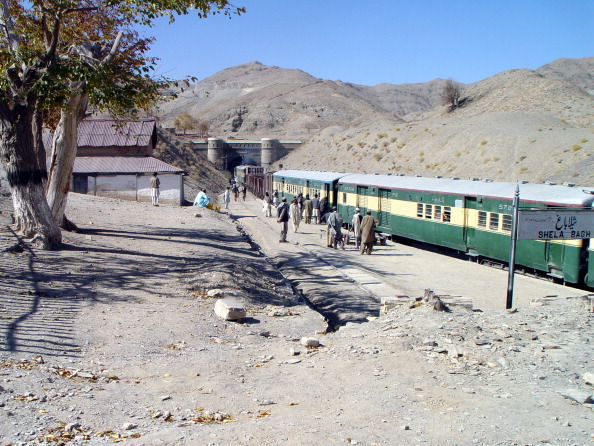
- A view of Shela Bagh railway station

General information
- Location: Shela Bagh, Qilla Abdullah district, Balochistan; Pakistan
- Coordinates: 30.8304°N 66.5898°E
- Owner: Ministry of Railways
- Line: Rohri-Chaman railway line

Other information
- Station code: SBA

Services
Preceding station	Pakistan Railways	Following station
Qilla Abdullah towards Rohri Junction	Rohri–Chaman Line	Chaman Terminus
Location

Shela Bagh Railway Station (Urdu: شیلاباغ ریلوے اسٹیشن, Balochi:شیلاباغ ریلوے اسٹیشن) is located in Shela Bagh town, Qilla Abdullah district of Balochistan province of the Pakistan.

This railway station is gateway of the famous Khojak tunnel.

== See also ==
- List of railway stations in Pakistan
- Pakistan Railways
