= SHQ =

SHQ or shq may refer to:

- SHQ, the IATA code for Southport Airport, Queensland, Australia
- SHQ, the Pinyin code for Shanghai Hongqiao railway station, Shanghai, China
- SHQ, the station code for Shori railway station, Balochistan, Pakistan
- shq, the ISO 639-3 code for Sala language, Zambia
- Spejbl and Huvínek Quintet
