= Gulistan Tehsil =

Gulistan
- Tehsil
- Country: Pakistan
- Province: Balochistan
- District: Qilla Abdullah
- Time zone: UTC+5 (PST)
- Number of towns: 1
- Number of Union Councils: 5

Gulistan is an administrative subdivision (tehsil) of Qilla Abdullah District in the Balochistan province of Pakistan. The tehsil is administratively subdivided into five Union Councils and is headquartered at the town of Gulistan. According 2017 population of tehsil is 115,172.
