= Khojak Tunnel =

Railway tunnel in Pakistan

Khojak Tunnel خوجک سرنگ
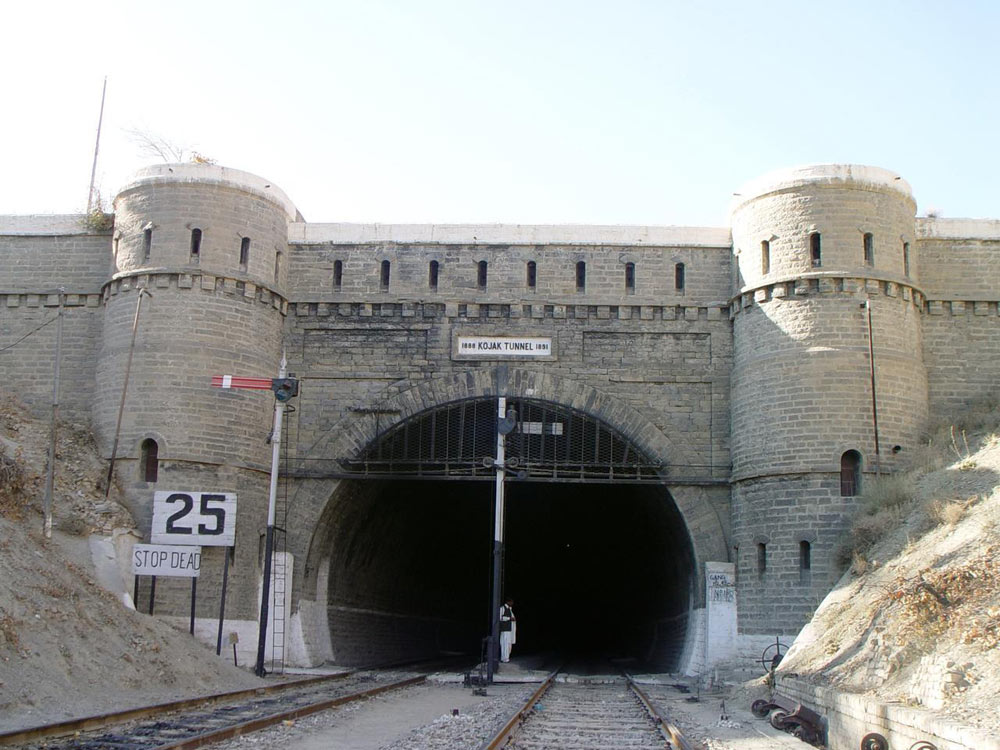
- Entrance of the Khojak Tunnel
- Interactive map of Khojak Tunnel خوجک سرنگ

Overview
- Line: Rohri–Chaman Railway Line
- Coordinates: 30°49′54″N 66°35′16″E
- Status: Operational
- Crosses: Khojak Pass in Toba Achakzai range
- No. of stations: Shela Bagh

Operation
- Opened: 1891
- Owner: Ministry of Railways
- Operator: Pakistan Railways

Technical
- Length: 3.91 kilometres (2.43 miles)
- Track gauge: 1,676 mm (5 ft 6 in)

Location in Pakistan (relief map)
Location in Balochistan

The Khojak Tunnel (Urdu: خوجک سرنگ, Khojak Sarang), is a 3.91 km (2.43 mi) railway tunnel in the Toba Achakzai range in the Qilla Abdullah District of Balochistan province, Pakistan. It is located 1,945 m (6,381 ft) above sea level under the Khojak Pass.

The tunnel was completed in 1891 by the British Raj. It was part of the Rohri–Chaman Line, which opened in 1879 through the North-West Frontier Province. The tunnel is one of the longest tunnels in South Asia, and was the longest in Pakistan until superseded by the 8.75 km (5.44 mi) Lowari Tunnel in 2018. Its civil engineering stature resulted in it being featured on a post-Independence Pakistani Five Rupee banknote.

== History ==
The tunnel was built by the British under the Khojak Pass. Construction took three years to complete; it opened to regular rail services in 1891. The civil engineering is so precise, the tunnel is straight enough that reflected light from a mirror at one end can be seen 4.0 km (2.5 mi) at the other portal. It remains one of the longest tunnels in South Asia, and the second longest in Pakistan, having been surpassed in length by the Lowari Pass in 2018.

The track laying and labor contractor was Waja Durra Khan Gorgigh Baloch from Karachi whose family originally migrated from Bahu Kalat (now inside Iran) in the early 1800s. In his teens he got his first contract from the British while working on Karachi Port. Later on he was awarded various railway contracts from Balochistan to Assam, Bangalore and later Rangoon, Burma. After his death his son took charge of the business. The British awarded this son, Waja Fakir Muhammad Durra Khan, the status of honorary judge in Karachi city court. When he died, the British named a road from Badshahi road to 8 chowk Lyari in his honor.

== Gallery ==
Photo Gallery of Khojak tunnel
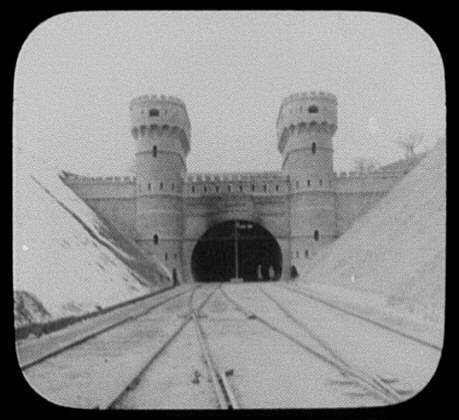
Tunnel at Kojack Pass - western end, 1895

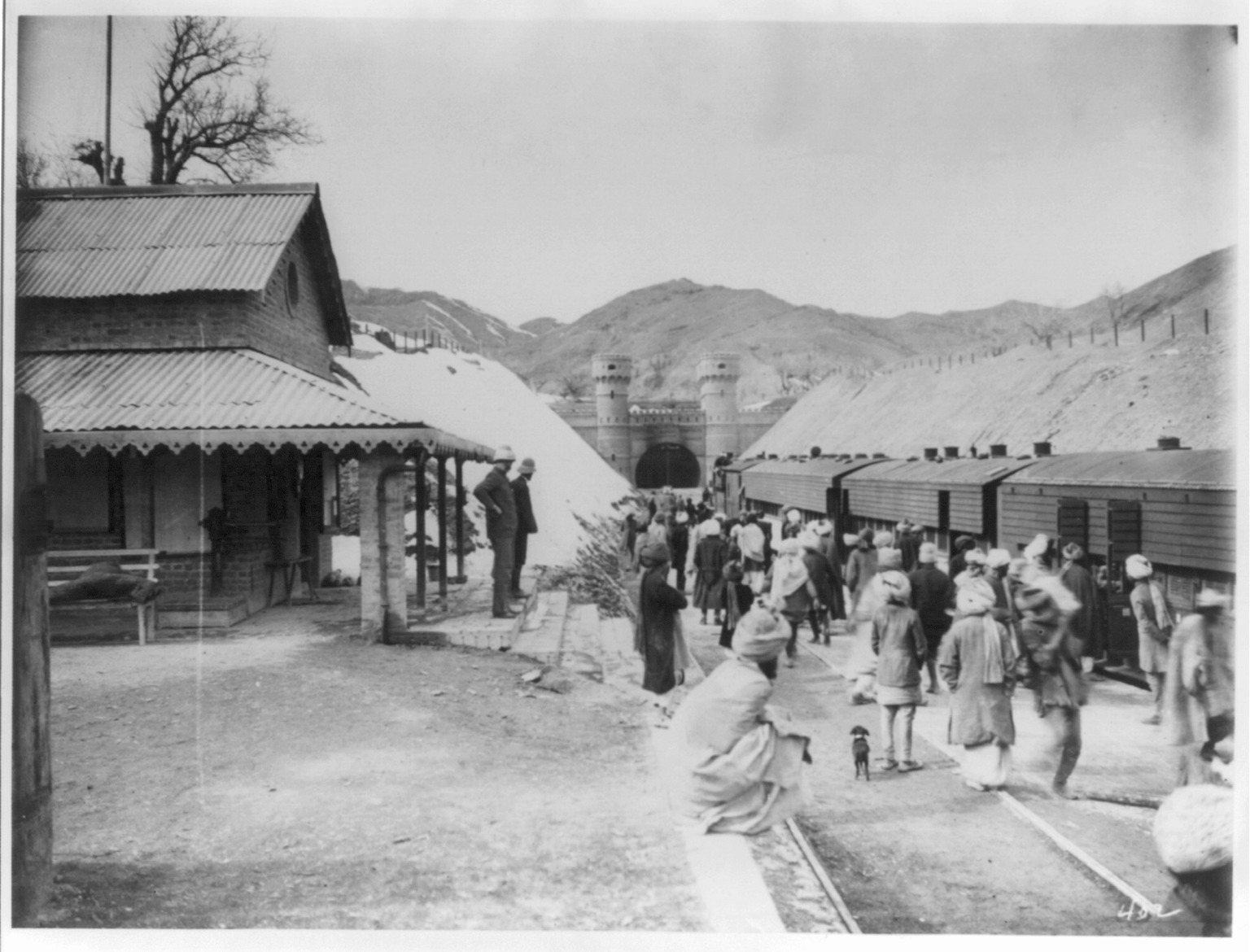
Gulistan station on the Great Military Railway, at entrance to Khojak Tunnel

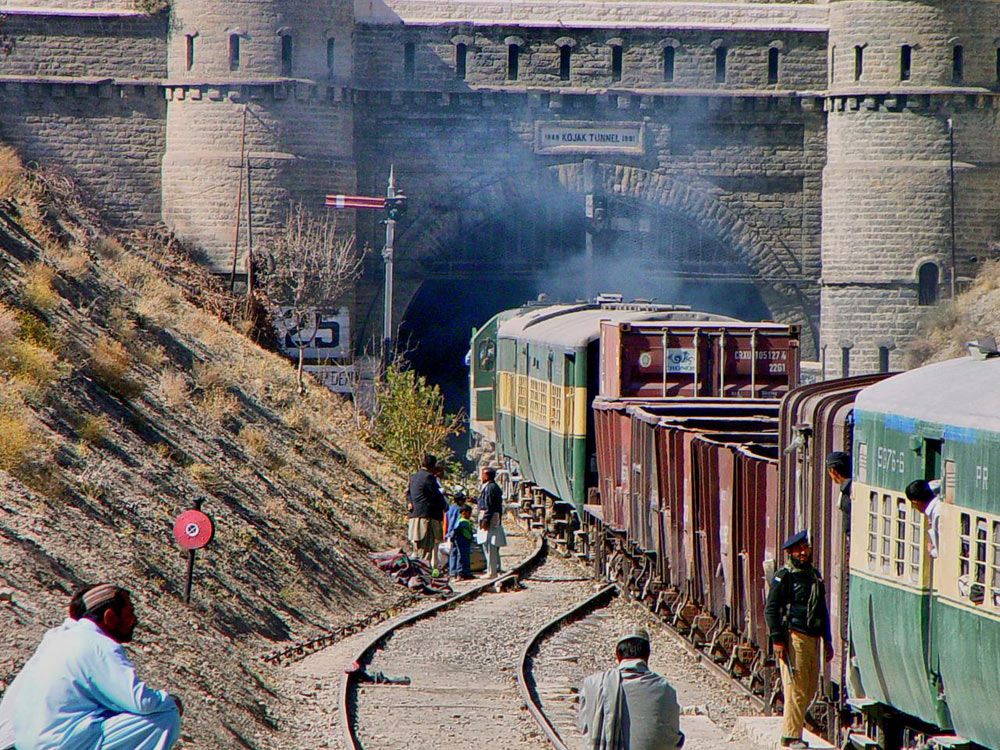
Train standing at Shela Bagh railway station

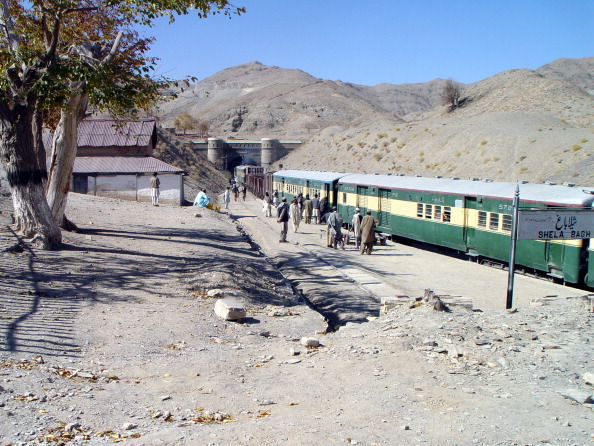
Chaman Passenger Train entering Khojak Tunnel

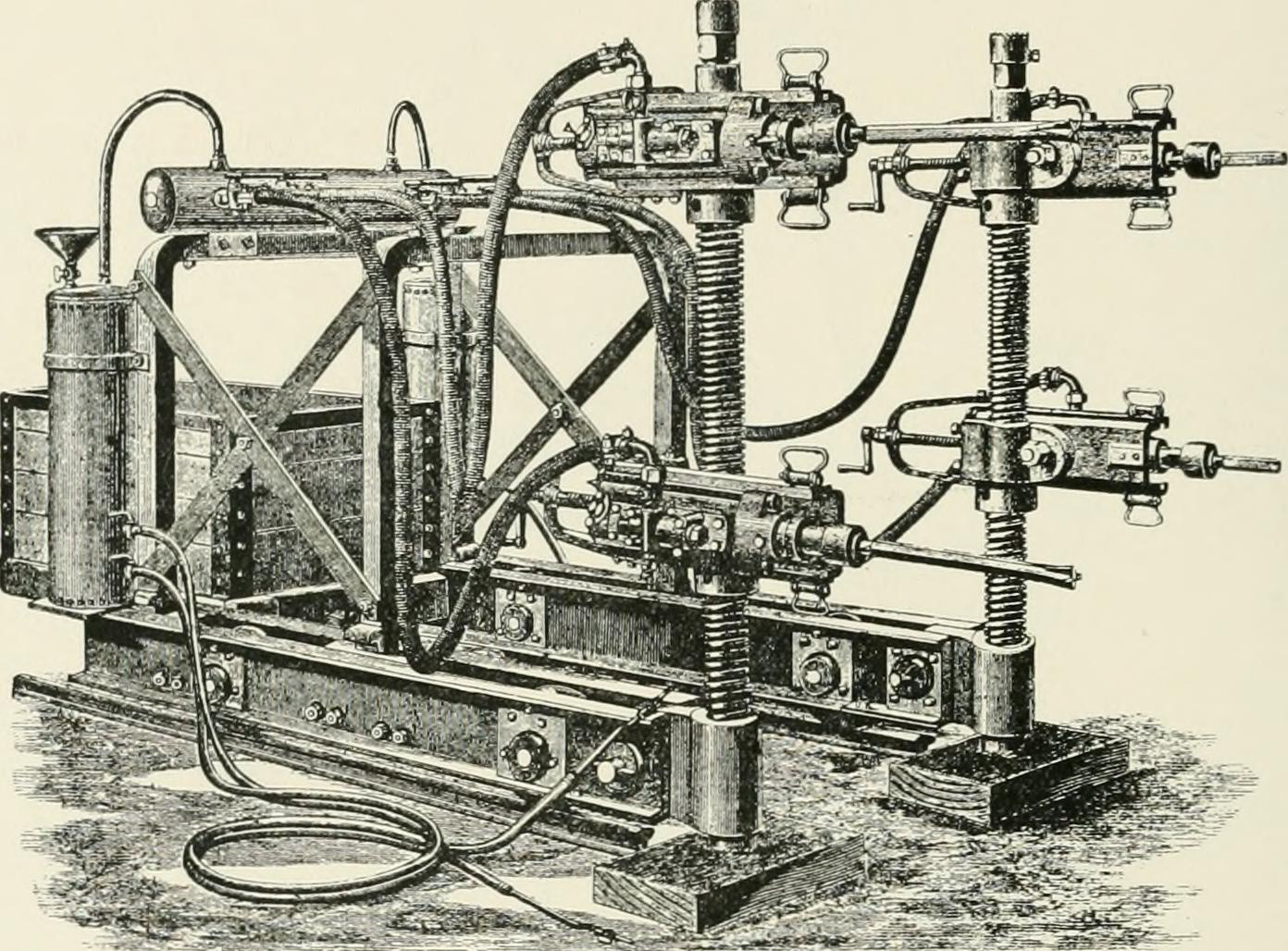
Schram's Rock Drill Carriage used in excavation of the tunnel
