= Arain Road railway station =

Railway station in Pakistan

Arain Road Railway Station آرائیں روڈ ریلوے اسٹیشن آرائين روڊ ريلوي اسٽيشن

General information
- Coordinates: 27.731973°N 68.813608°E
- Owner: Ministry of Railways

Other information
- Station code: AOD

Services
Preceding station	Pakistan Railways	Following station
Sukkur towards Rohri Junction	Rohri–Chaman Line	Gosarji towards Chaman
Location

Arain Road Railway Station (Urdu: آرائیں روڈ ریلوے اسٹیشن, Sindhi: آرائين روڊ ريلوي اسٽيشن) is located on Arain Road, Sukkur district of Sindh province of the Pakistan.

== See also ==
- List of railway stations in Pakistan
- Pakistan Railways
