= Sukkur railway station =

Railway station in Pakistan

Sukkur Railway Station سكهر ریلوے اسٹیشن سکر ريلوي اسٽيشن

General information
- Coordinates: 27.7006°N 68.8668°E
- Owner: Ministry of Railways

Construction
- Parking: Available
- Accessible: Available

Other information
- Station code: SUK

History
- Opened: 1891

Services
Preceding station	Pakistan Railways	Following station
Rohri Junction Terminus	Rohri–Chaman Line	Arian Road towards Chaman
Location
- Location within Pakistan Location within Sindh

Sukkur Railway Station (Urdu: سكهر ریلوے اسٹیشن, Sindhi: سکر ریلوي اسٽیشن) is a railway station located in Sukkur, Sindh, Pakistan.

A Dak bungalow, now used as a resthouse, is located here.

== History ==
The railway station was built in 1891, when Sukkur was part of British India.

== Train routes ==
The routes are Sukkur from linked with Karachi, Lahore, Faisalabad, Rawalpindi, Peshawar, Quetta, Multan, Hyderabad, Rohri, Jacobabad, Bahawalpur, Dera Ghazi Khan, Kot Adu, Gujrat, Larkana, Gujranwala, Khanewal, Nawabshah, Attock, Dadu, and Nowshera.

== Train services from Sukkur ==
The following trains serve this station:

Train name	Stations
Jaffar Express	Quetta, Sibi, Jacobabad, Sukkur, Bahawalpur, Multan, Lahore, Gujranwala, Gujrat, Rawalpindi
Sukkur Express	Jacobabad, Shikarpur, Sukkur, Rohri, Pad Idan, Nawabshah, Tando Adam, Hyderabad, Karachi

== See also ==
- List of railway stations in Pakistan
- Pakistan Railways
