= Pehro Kunri railway station =

Railway station in Pakistan

Pehro Kunri Railway Station پھیرو کنری ریلوے اسٹیشن

General information
- Coordinates: 29.6174°N 67.6669°E
- Owner: Ministry of Railways
- Line: Rohri-Chaman Railway Line

Other information
- Station code: PFK

Services
Preceding station	Pakistan Railways	Following station
Mushkaf towards Rohri Junction	Rohri–Chaman Line	Bolan towards Chaman
Location

Pehro Kunri Railway Station (Urdu: پھیرو کنری ریلوے اسٹیشن, Balochi: پھیرو کنری ریلوے اسٹیشن) is located in Pehro Kunri village, Kachhi district of Balochistan province, Pakistan.

== See also ==
- List of railway stations in Pakistan
- Pakistan Railways
