= Mithri railway station =

Railway station in Pakistan

Coordinates: 29.3876°N 67.8558°E

Mithri Railway Station مٹھری ریلوے اسٹیشن

General information
- Owner: Ministry of Railways
- Line: Rohri-Chaman Railway Line

Other information
- Station code: MIT

Services
Preceding station	Pakistan Railways	Following station
Dingra towards Rohri Junction	Rohri–Chaman Line	Perak towards Chaman
Location

Mithri Railway Station (Urdu: مٹھری ریلوے اسٹیشن) is located in Pakistan.

== See also ==
- List of railway stations in Pakistan
- Pakistan Railways
