= Bala Niganda =

Village in Pishin District, Pakistan

Coordinates: 30°37′29″N 67°14′44″E

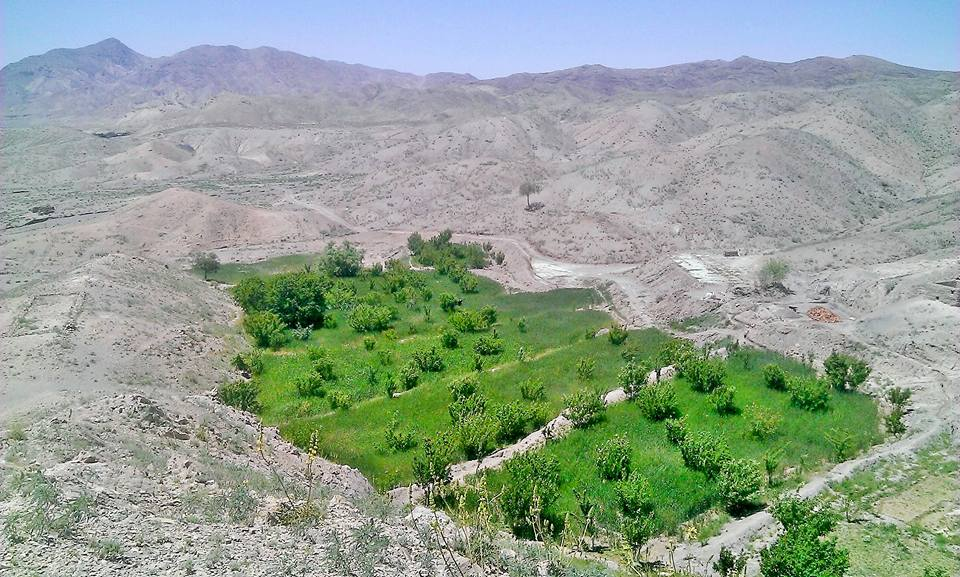
Karezat Bala Niganda

Bala Niganda is a village in Balozai tehsil, Pishin District of Balochistan, Pakistan.
