= Mushkaf railway station =

Railway station in Pakistan

Coordinates: 29.5651°N 67.7303°E

Mushkaf Railway Station مشکاف ریلوے اسٹیشن

General information
- Owner: Ministry of Railways
- Line: Rohri-Chaman Railway Line

Other information
- Station code: MKF

Services
Preceding station	Pakistan Railways	Following station
Sibi towards Rohri Junction	Rohri–Chaman Line	Pehro Kunri towards Chaman
Location

Mushkaf Railway Station (Urdu: مشکاف ریلوے اسٹیشن, Balochi: مشکاف ریلوے اسٹیشن) is located in Mushkaf village, Kachhi district of Balochistan province, Pakistan.

== See also ==
- List of railway stations in Pakistan
- Pakistan Railways
