= Nuttall railway station =

Railway station in Pakistan

Coordinates: 28.750583°N 68.076655°E

Nuttall Railway Station نٹال ریلوے اسٹیشن

General information
- Owner: Ministry of Railways
- Line: Rohri-Chaman Railway Line

Other information
- Station code: NTL

Services
Preceding station	Pakistan Railways	Following station
Ramdani towards Rohri Junction	Rohri–Chaman Line	Wazirani towards Chaman
Location

Nuttall Railway Station (Urdu: نٹال ریلوے اسٹیشن, Balochi: نٹال ریلوے اسٹیشن) is located in Nuttall village, Nasirabad district of Balochistan province of Pakistan.

== See also ==
- List of railway stations in Pakistan
- Pakistan Railways
