= Bolan Pass =

Mountain pass in Balochistan, Pakistan

Bolān Pass درۂ بولان
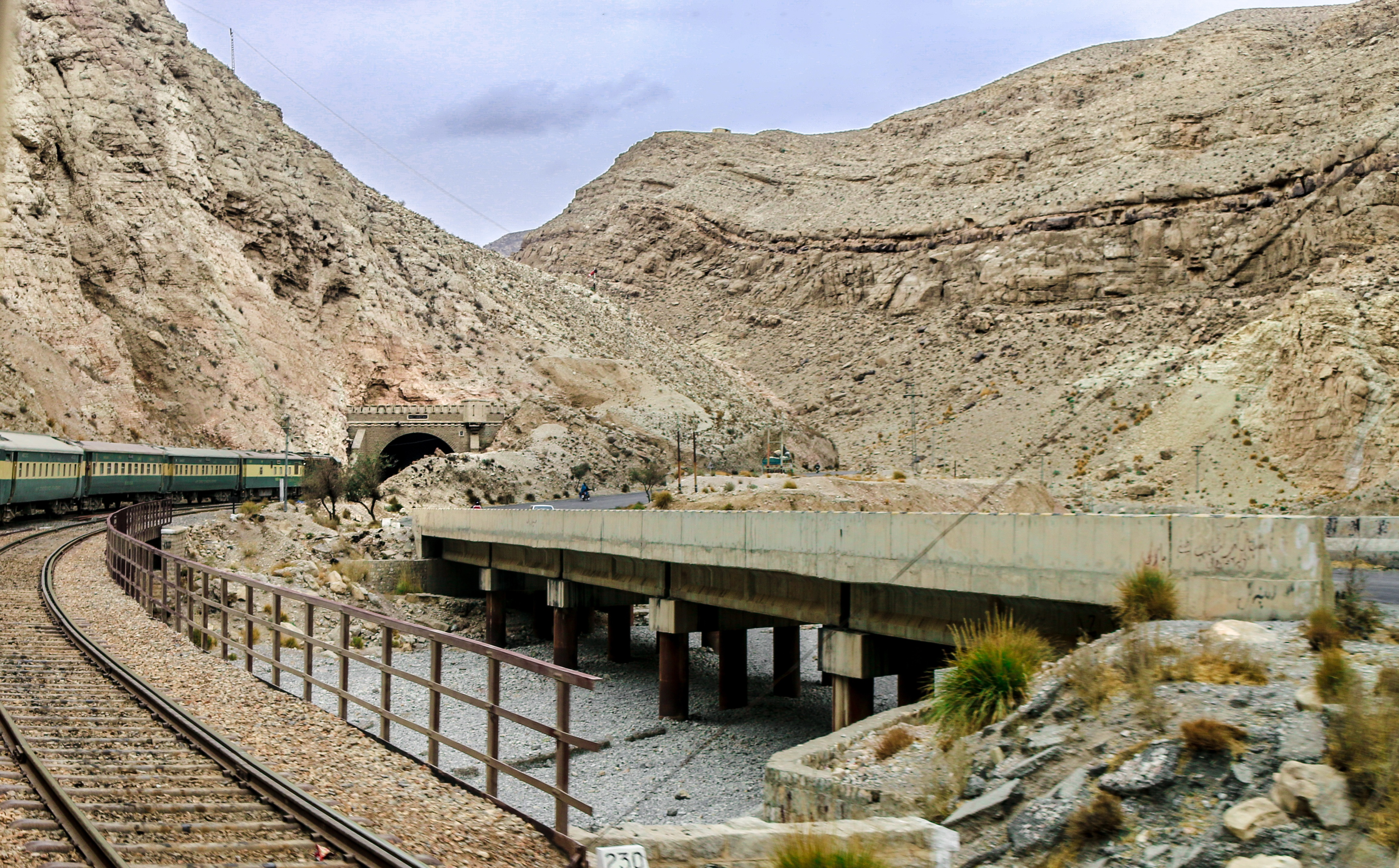
- A railway track traverses the pass

- Location within Pakistan Location within Balochistan, Pakistan
- Elevation: 1,793.4 metres (5,884 ft)
- Traversed by: N-65 National Highway; Rohri–Chaman Railway Line

Third Approach
- Location: Sibi, Pakistan
- Range: Toba Kakar range
- Coordinates: 29.453516°N 67.494648°E

Bolan Pass (Urdu: درۂ بولان) is a valley and a natural gateway through the Toba Kakar range in Balochistan province of Pakistan. It is situated 120 km (75 miles) south of Pakistan's border with Afghanistan. The pass is an 89 km (55 miles) stretch of the Bolan River valley from Rindli in the south to Darwāza near Kolpur in the north. It is made up of a number of narrow gorges and stretches. It connects Quetta with Sibi by road and railway.

Being strategically located, it has also been used by traders, invaders, and nomadic tribes as a gateway to and from South Asia. The Bolān Pass is an important pass on the Baluch frontier, connecting Jacobabad and Jhang with Multan, which has always occupied an important place in the history of British campaigns in Afghanistan.

The local population south of the pass predominantly consists of Brahvi tribes, who extend from Bolan Pass to Cape Monze on the Arabian Sea. The ethnic group north of the pass consists of mainly Pashtuns, while to west, Balochis.

== Geography ==
The Bolan Pass runs between Rindli (Dhadar) and Darwaza (Kolpur)

The Bolan Pass is in the Toba Kakar range which lies south of the Hindu Kush mountain ranges. Bolan Pass is described as a pass over a lofty range that is full of ravines and gorges. The mountain ranges of the Bolan pass are the southern geographic border between the Indian Plate and the Iranian plateau. The southern point of the pass, near Dhadar, is the western bound of the Indus Valley and is seen as a great strategic point between Pakistan, Afghanistan, Iran and the Arabian Sea.

== History ==
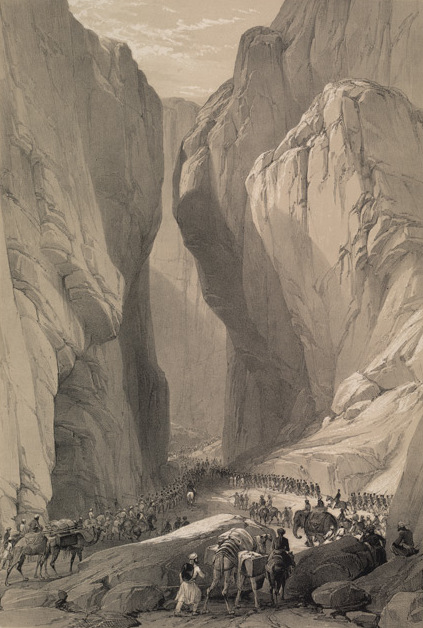
"Entrance to the Bolan Pass from Dadur"; Sketch by James Atkinson, 1842

The Bolan pass is the southern counterpart of the Khyber Pass. Both ranges have been used throughout history for invasions of the Indian subcontinent. In 1748, the Afghan king Ahmad Shah Durrani invaded India by using the Bolan Pass in addition to the traditional Khyber Pass route. The Durrani capital Qandahar was located nearby the pass which gave quick access to Indian lands.

In 1837, threatened by a possible Russian invasion of South Asia via the Khyber and Bolān Passes, a British envoy was sent to Kabul to gain support of the Emir, Dost Mohammed. In February 1839, during the First Anglo-Afghan War, the British Army under Sir John Keane took 12,000 men through the Bolān Pass and entered Qandahar, which the Afghan princes had abandoned; from there they would go on to attack and overthrow Ghazni.The pass they chose was not the same as that used by the modern railway line, but further west at Siri-Bolan. A British officer of the Bengal Artillery described the Bolan Pass in 1841 in these words:

"The road through this pass leads, with few and rare exceptions, along what is the bed of a mountain-torrent, when filled by the melting of the snows or heavy rains, and is composed of loose shingly gravel, that recedes from under your feet, and is very difficult for draught: camels get on well. It is infested by the Kakurs, who live by robbery; and the hills sometimes close in upon the road, which is filled up by the bed of the stream, running through rocky chasms, upwards of a hundred feet high, from the top of which the robbers assail the travellers with stones; and were they as bold as they are cruel and perfidious, they might hold the place against all comers. Many spots were pointed out to me by the guides I had with me, as signalised by acts of violence, several European officers having lost their baggage during our occupation of the country. Should there be rain in the higher parts of the mountains, the stream at times comes down in an almost perpendicular volume, without warning, and sweeping all before it, as a friend of mine experienced, when he saw a party of men, horses, and camels, and all his property, borne down by it; when himself and some few men with him escaped by climbing up the nearly perpendicular side of the hill. About thirty-seven men were washed away upon that occasion."

In 1883, Sir Robert Groves Sandeman negotiated with the Khan of Kalat, Khudadad Khan, and secured British control over the pass in exchange for an annual fee.

== Bolan Pass railway ==
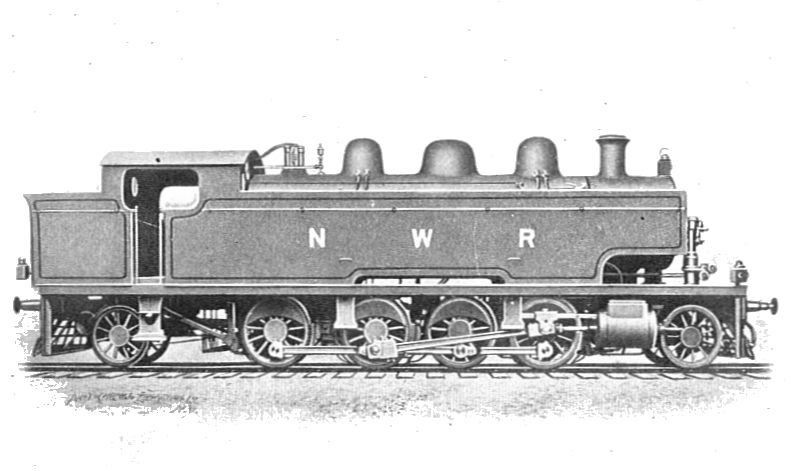
Tank locomotive, built around 1907 for service on the Bolān Pass railway

From Sibi, the line runs south-west, skirting the hills to Rindli and originally followed the course of the Bolan stream to its head on the plateau. The destructive action of floods, however, led to the abandonment of this alignment, and the railway now follows the Mashkaf valley (which debouches into the plains close to Sibi), and is carried from near the head of the Mashkaf to a junction with the Bolan at Machh. An alternative route from Sibi to Quetta was found in the Harnai valley to the N.E. of Sibi, the line starting in exactly the opposite direction to that of the Bolān and entering the hills at Nari. Originally the Harnai route, although longer, was the one adopted for ordinary traffic, the Bolan loop being reserved for emergencies. However, the route suffered regularly from floods and land slips. Hence the Bolan route was upgraded in 1895 to handle all traffic with the Harnai route kept for local traffic. In 1942 floods destroyed a large part of the line and all through running ceased. By 1943 all bridges and track between Khost and Bostan had been recovered. At this time (2024) the line from Sibi to Khost still exists but is out of Service. At the Khundilani gorge of the Bolan route conglomerate cliffs which rise to a height of 800 feet (240 m), enclose the valley. At Siri Bolan the passage between the limestone rocks hardly admits of three persons riding abreast. The temperature of the pass in summer is extremely high. In winter, it is the extremely cold, and the ice-cold wind rushing down the narrow outlet becomes destructive to life. Since 1877, when the Quetta agency was founded, the pass was secured by the British Indian Army from militias of Baloch tribesmen (chiefly Marris).

In 2025, the Jaffar Express was hijacked by the Balochistan Liberation Army in Bolan Pass.

== See also ==
- Balochistan
- Kacchi Plain
- Mehrgarh
- Sulaiman Mountains
