= Panir railway station =

Railway station in Pakistan

Panir Railway Station پانیر ریلوے اسٹیشن

General information
- Coordinates: 29.6756°N 67.5461°E
- Owner: Ministry of Railways
- Line: Rohri-Chaman Railway Line

Other information
- Station code: PIR

Services
Preceding station	Pakistan Railways	Following station
Bolan towards Rohri Junction	Rohri–Chaman Line	Peshi towards Chaman
Location

Panir Railway Station (Urdu: پانیر ریلوے اسٹیشن, Balochi: پانیر ریلوے اسٹیشن) was a railway station located in Paniri village, Kachhi district of Balochistan province, Pakistan.

== See also ==
- List of railway stations in Pakistan
- Pakistan Railways
