= Mangoli railway station =

Railway station in Pakistan

Mangoli Railway Station منگولی ریلوے اسٹیشن

General information
- Owner: Ministry of Railways
- Line: Rohri-Chaman Railway Line

Other information
- Station code: MLE

Services
Preceding station	Pakistan Railways	Following station
Dera Allah Yar towards Rohri Junction	Rohri–Chaman Line	Dera Murad Jamali towards Chaman
Location

Mangoli Railway Station (Urdu: منگولی ریلوے اسٹیشن, Balochi: منگولی ریلوے اسٹیشن ) is located in Mangoli village, Jaffarabad district of Balochistan province, Pakistan.

== See also ==
- List of railway stations in Pakistan
- Pakistan Railways
