= Jan Achakzai =

Pakistani politician (born 1970)

Information Minister of Balochistan (caretaker)
- In office August 2023 – February 2024
- Prime Minister: Anwaar ul Haq Kakar (caretaker)

Personal details
- Born: Jan Muhammad Khan Achakzai; 1970 (age 55–56) Quetta, Balochistan, Pakistan
- Party: Pakistan Muslim League (N) (2016–present)
- Other political affiliations: Jamiat Ulema-e-Islam (F) (2013–2015)

Jan Muhammad Khan Achakzai (Note: Urdu: جان محمد خان اچکزئی; Pashto: جان محمد خان اڅکزی) (born 1970) is a Pakistani politician, journalist and writer. He served as the caretaker information minister of Balochistan from August 2023 to February 2024. He is one the senior members of the Pakistan Muslim League (N).

== Early life and education ==
Jan Muhammad Khan Achakzai was born in 1970 in Quetta, Balochistan, Pakistan, to a family belonging to the Achakzai tribe of Durrani Pashtuns. He studied at the University of Balochistan and later University of London.

== Career ==
Achakzai spent two decades in the United Kingdom and became associated with the BBC World Service and Voice of America. As a writer, he worked with Balochistan Times for six years. Achakzai launched his own magazine Quetta Gazzett in 1996.

After returning to Pakistan, Achakzai joined the Jamiat Ulema-e-Islam (F) and served as their spokesperson from 2013 to 2015. He was described as a "close aide" to JUI-F's leader Fazal-ur-Rahman.

In September 2015, he left JUI-F after differences with some of their party leaders. In June 2016, Achakzai joined Pakistan Muslim League (N) for its 'development-centric policies'. He became a spokesperson for the PML-N's government under Prime Minister Nawaz Sharif and Prime Minister Shahid Khaqan Abbasi.

In August 2023, Achakzai was appointed caretaker information minister of Balochistan. He held the post until around the 2024 Balochistan provincial election.

== Views ==
Achakzai has expressed views highly critical of the Afghan Taliban and Pakistani Taliban.
