= Moghari railway station =

Railway station in Pakistan

Moghari Railway Station موگھاری ریلوے اسٹیشن

General information
- Owner: Ministry of Railways
- Line: Rohri–Chaman Line

Other information
- Station code: MRZ

Services
Preceding station	Pakistan Railways	Following station
Wazirani towards Rohri Junction	Rohri–Chaman Line	Bukhtiarabad Domki towards Chaman
Location

Moghari Railway Station (Urdu: موگھاری ریلوے اسٹیشن) is located in Pakistan.

== See also ==
- List of railway stations in Pakistan
- Pakistan Railways
