= Gosarji railway station =

Railway station in Pakistan

Coordinates: 27.777187°N 68.762364°E

Gosarji Railway Station گوسڑجی ریلوے اسٹیشن گوسڙجي ريلوي اسٽيشن

General information
- Owner: Ministry of Railways
- Line: Rohri–Chaman Railway Line

Other information
- Station code: GSRJ

Services
Preceding station	Pakistan Railways	Following station
Arian Road towards Rohri Junction	Rohri–Chaman Line	Habib Kot Junction towards Chaman
Location

Gosarji Railway Station (Urdu: گوسڑجی ریلوے اسٹیشن, Sindhi: گوسڙجي ريلوي اسٽيشن) is located in Gosarji village, Sukkur district of Sindh province of the Pakistan.

== See also ==
- List of railway stations in Pakistan
- Pakistan Railways
