= Wazirani railway station =

Railway station in Pakistan

Wazirani Railway Station وزیرانی ریلوے اسٹیشن

General information
- Coordinates: 28°48′30″N 68°03′52″E
- Owner: Ministry of Railways
- Line: Rohri–Chaman Railway Line

Other information
- Station code: WZI

Services
Preceding station	Pakistan Railways	Following station
Nuttall towards Rohri Junction	Rohri–Chaman Line	Moghari towards Chaman
Location

Wazirani Railway Station (Urdu: وزیرانی ریلوے اسٹیشن) is located in Balochistan, Pakistan.

== See also ==
- List of railway stations in Pakistan
- Pakistan Railways
