= Spin Boldak bombing =

2008 Taliban attack in Afghanistan

- Location: Spin Boldak, Afghanistan
- Date: February 18, 2008; 2:30 pm (GMT+4:30 Kabul (UTC))
- Attack type: Suicide attack
- Deaths: 38
- Injuries: 29+
- Perpetrator: Abdul Rahman (Taliban)

The Spin Boldak bombing was a terrorist attack that occurred on February 18, 2008, when a car bomb detonated near a Canadian military convoy in a market in Spin Boldak, Afghanistan. The attack killed 38 Afghans and injured at least 25 civilians. In addition, four Canadian soldiers were lightly injured.

This suicide bombing – directed at a small convoy of Canadian armoured vehicles conducting a routine patrol alongside the Pakistan-Afghanistan border in Spin Boldak – occurred just one day after the 2008 Kandahar bombing, the deadliest terrorist attack during the Afghanistan War up until then.

Kandahar Governor Asadullah Khalid said the bombing would not have happened if the Canadians had heeded his warning about a suicide bomber moving about the area and not gone to Spin Boldak.
