= Shori railway station =

Railway station in Balochistan, Pakistan

Coordinates: 28.6500°N 68.1423°E

Shori Railway Station شوری ریلوے اسٹیشن

General information
- Owner: Ministry of Railways
- Line: Rohri–Chaman Railway Line

Other information
- Station code: SHQ

Services
Preceding station	Pakistan Railways	Following station
Hejwani towards Rohri Junction	Rohri–Chaman Line	Ramdani towards Chaman
Location
- Location within Balochistan, Pakistan Location within Pakistan

Shori Railway Station (Urdu: شوری ریلوے اسٹیشن) was a railway station located in Balochistan, Pakistan.

== See also ==
- List of railway stations in Pakistan
- Pakistan Railways
