= Rohri–Chaman Line =

Main railway line in Pakistan

Rohri–Chaman Railway Line روہڑی–چمن مرکزی ریل راستہ

Overview
- Other name(s): Main Line 3 ML-3
- Owner: Pakistan Railways
- Line number: 3
- Termini: Rohri Junction; Chaman
- Stations: 38

Service
- Operator: Pakistan Railways

History
- Opened: 6 October 1879; 146 years ago

Technical
- Line length: 526 km (327 mi)
- Track gauge: 1,676 mm (5 ft 6 in)
- Operating speed: 30 km/h (19 mph) to 70 km/h (43 mph)

Rohri–Chaman Railway Line (Urdu: روہڑی–چمن مرکزی ریل راستہ) (also referred to as Main Line 3 or ML-3) is one of four main railway lines in Pakistan, operated and maintained by Pakistan Railways. The line begins from Rohri Junction station and ends at Chaman station. The total length of this railway line is 526 kilometers (327 mi). There are 38 railway stations from Rohri Junction to Chaman on this line and is famous for passing through the historic Bolan pass. This line incorporates part of the historic Sind–Pishin State Railway.

== History ==
Originally named the Sind–Pishin State Railway, this strategic railway line was constructed by the Scinde, Punjab & Delhi Railway. Construction began in 1879 and was completed in 1887, which by then was part of the North Western State Railway. Quetta was always considered as an important strategic destination by the British Raj, as they feared the Russian Empire could advance from Afghanistan into Quetta, thereby threatening its rule in South Asia. On 6 October 1879, work on the first section from Ruk (now Rohri) to Sibi (at the entrance of the Nari Pass) and was completed by 14 January 1880. The track had been laid in 101 days across the waterless desert by 5,000 men and their animals. In 1880, orders were issued for the line to be extended from Sibi to Quetta and onward to Pishin via the Harnai Pass and would become known as the Kandahar State Railway. It was initially thought that the Harnai pass was more suitable for broad gauge than the Bolan Pass. In 1883, construction began in secret and known in public as the "Harnai Road Improvement Scheme". From Sibi, the line ran southwest, skirting the hills to Rindli and originally followed the course of the Bolan stream to its head on the plateau. By February 1884, the line had only reached Zardalu. The tough terrain as well as the destructive action of floods led to the abandonment of this alignment. A new extension was thus proposed from Sibi through the Mashkaf Valley and Bolan Pass to Quetta and onward to Chaman in 1885. The line reached Quetta in March 1887, and reached Chaman in January 1892. The section between Khojak and Chaman required the construction of the longest railway tunnel in the North Western State Railway system.

== Stations ==
The stations on this line are as follows:

- Rohri Junction
- Sukkur
- Arian Road
- Gosarji
- Habib Kot Junction
- Shikarpur
- Sultankot
- Abad
- Jacobabad Junction
- Dera Allah Yar
- Mangoli (abandoned)
- Dera Murad Jamali
- Shori (abandoned)
- Nuttall
- Wazirani (Abandoned)
- Moghari (Abandoned)
- Bakhtiarabad Domki
- Damboli
- Lindsay (Abandoned)
- Dingra (Abandoned)
- Mithri (Abandoned)
- Perak
- Sibi Junction
- Mushkaf
- Pehro Kunri
- Panir
- Kohsar (Abandoned)
- Peshi
- Chidarzai (Abandoned)
- Ab-I-Gum
- Mach
- Hirok
- Dozan
- Kolpur
- Kori Dor (Abandoned)
- Spezand Junction
- Sar-i-Ab
- Quetta
- Sheikh Mandah
- Beleli
- Kuchlak
- Bostan Junction
- Yaru
- Saranan Halt
- Gulistan
- Qilla Abdullah
- Shela Bagh
- Sanzala (Abandoned)
- Chaman

== See also ==
- Karachi–Peshawar Railway Line
- Railway lines in Pakistan
