= Kohsar railway station =

Railway station in Pakistan

General information
- Coordinates: 29.6997°N 67.5092°E
- Owner: Ministry of Railways

Other information
- Station code: KOSR

History
- Former names: Great Indian Peninsula Railway
Location

Kohsar railway station (Urdu: کوہسار ریلوے اسٹیشن) is located in Pakistan.

== See also ==
- List of railway stations in Pakistan
- Pakistan Railways
