= Dingra railway station =

Railway station in Pakistan

Coordinates: 29.287°N 67.8963°E

Dingra Railway Station ڈنگڑا ریلوے اسٹیشن

General information
- Owner: Ministry of Railways
- Line: Rohri-Chaman Railway Line

Other information
- Station code: DNF

Services
| Preceding station | Pakistan Railways | Following station |
|---|---|---|
| Damboli towards Rohri Junction | Rohri–Chaman Line | Mithri towards Chaman |
Location

Dingra Railway Station (Urdu: ڈنگڑا ریلوے اسٹیشن, Balochi: دنگرا ریلوے اسٹیشن) is located in Dingra village, Kachhi district of Balochistan province, Pakistan.

== See also ==
- List of railway stations in Pakistan
- Pakistan Railways
