= Chidarzai railway station =

Railway station in Pakistan

Coordinates: 29.79226°N 67.451374°E

General information
- Owner: Ministry of Railways
- Line: Rohri–Chaman Railway Line

Other information
- Station code: CDZ
Location

Chidarzai railway station (Urdu: چیدارزئی ریلوے اسٹیشن) is located in Pakistan.

== See also ==
- List of railway stations in Pakistan
- Pakistan Railways
