= Spin Boldak District =

Geographic district in Afghanistan

Coordinates: 31.0081°N 66.3981°E

Spin Boldak (Pashto: سپین بولدک) is a district in the eastern part of Kandahar Province, Afghanistan. It borders Daman District to the west, Arghistan District to the north, Qila Abdullah District of Pakistan to the east and Shorabak District to the south. The population was estimated at 100,400 in 2006. The district center is the town of Spin Boldak, located in the western part of the district on the road to Pakistan.

On 21 November 2009, five Afghan Border Force members were killed by a roadside bomb.
