= Afghanistan–Pakistan Friendship Gate =

Border crossing between Afghanistan and Pakistan

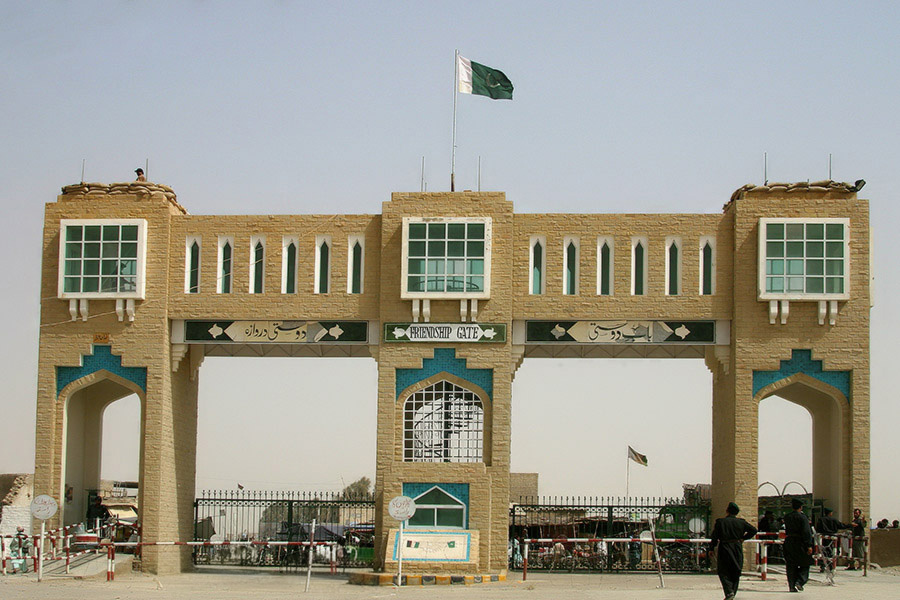
- View of the Afghanistan–Pakistan Friendship Gate in 2017 from the Pakistani side

- Location within Balochistan, Pakistan Location within Pakistan Location within Asia
- Coordinates: 30°55′20″N 66°26′41″E
- Countries: Pakistan; Afghanistan
- Provinces: Balochistan; Kandahar
- Districts: Chaman; Spin Boldak
- Control: Pakistan (Afghanistan) Taliban
- Time zone: UTC+5 (PST)

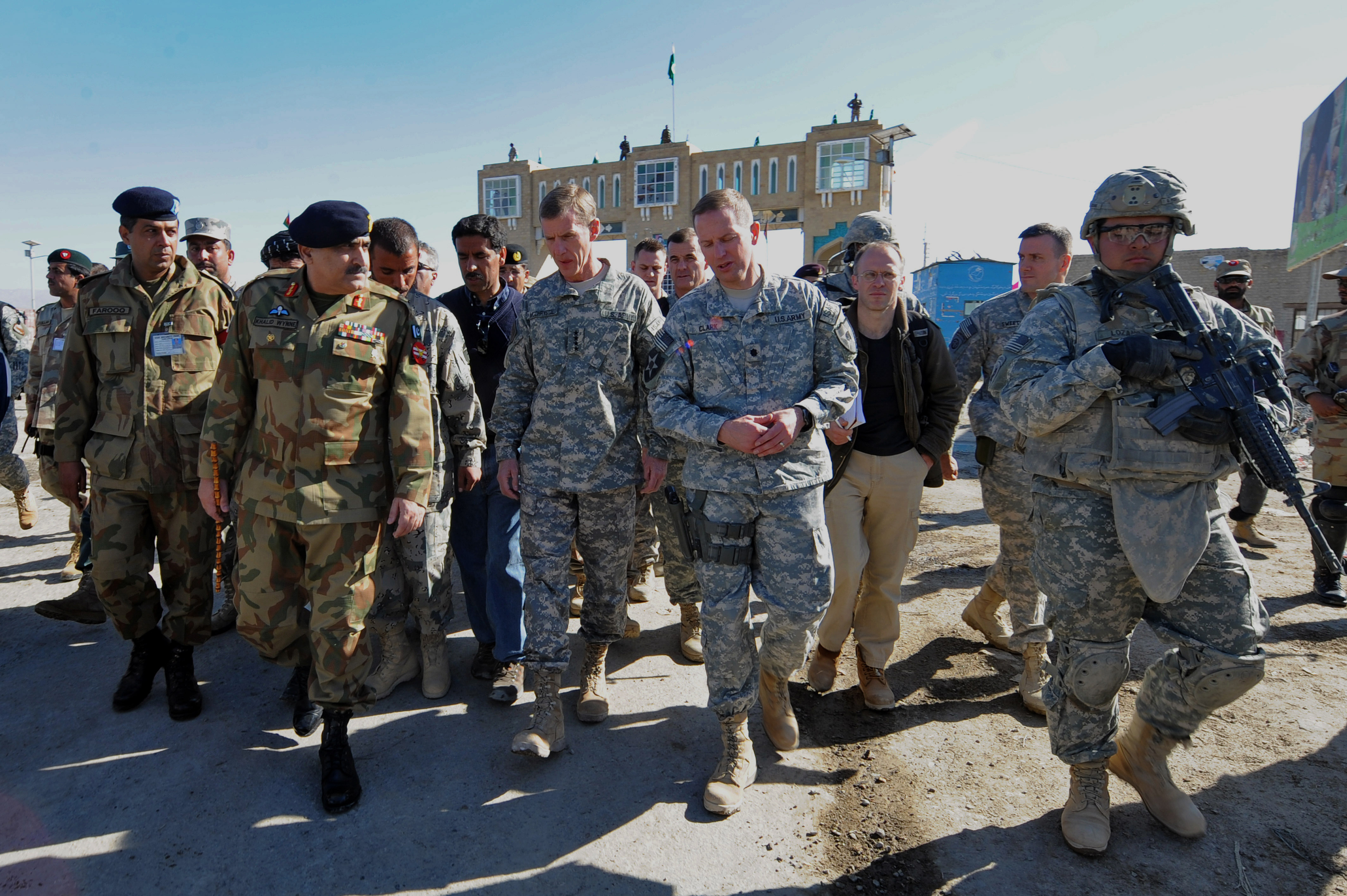
U.S. Army Gen. Stanley McChrystal, commander of the International Security Assistance Force at the time, is meeting with Pakistani army Lt. Gen. Khalid Wynne, commander of Southern Command, at the Friendship Gate border crossing, in Spin Boldak, Afghanistan.

The Afghanistan–Pakistan Friendship Gate (Urdu: افغانستان پاکستان باب دوستی Dari: دروازه دوستی افغانستان و پاکستان Pashto: د افغانستان پاکستان د دوستۍ دروازه) is a double-arched brick gate located on the Afghanistan–Pakistan border near Spin Boldak District, Kandahar province, Afghanistan and Chaman District, Balochistan province, Pakistan. People on both sides cross the border on a daily basis through the gate. The gate also links the two provincial capitals, Kandahar and Quetta.

The gate was erected in 2003. The gate facing towards Balochistan bears the words "Proud Pakistani" and "Pakistan First".

== History ==
On 1 December 2003, the Afghanistan–Pakistan Friendship Gate was opened pedestrians of both sides for legally crossing the border.

On 10 January 2007, Pakistani authorities installed a biometric system at the gate in order to monitor the influx of smugglers and militants.

On 19 August 2016, a group of Afghan nationals pelted stones at the gate and burnt the flag of Pakistan, after which Pakistan closed the gate and border crossing. Few days later, on 1 September, Pakistan reopened the border after an apology from the Afghan side.

The border crossing was used by international forces (ISAF) in Afghanistan as part of a major supply route stretching from the Port of Karachi to Kandahar, with roughly 60 to 100 trucks traversing Chaman daily. On 14 July 2021, the Afghan side of the border crossing was captured by Taliban forces as part of the 2021 Taliban offensive.

=== 2025 Afghanistan–Pakistan clash ===
On the early morning of 15 October 2025, some Taliban officials stated that the Afghanistan–Pakistan Friendship Gate at the border crossing had been destroyed by Taliban forces. However, Pakistani officials countered, stating that the Taliban forces had only destroyed the portion of the gate on their side of the border. The following day, the Inspector General of Frontier Corps visited the border crossing and posed in front of the gate on the Pakistani side to demonstrate that it remained intact. A Pakistani media outlet also reported that the gate was in its original condition on the Pakistani side.
