= Khanozai =

- Country: Pakistan
- Provine: Balochistan
- District: Karezat District
- Tehsil: Karezat
- Elevation: 1,966 m (6,450 ft)

Population (2023)
  - Total: 46,682
- Website: www.khanozai.net

Khanozai (Urdu: خانوزئی) is a union council in Tehsil Karezat, Karezat District.

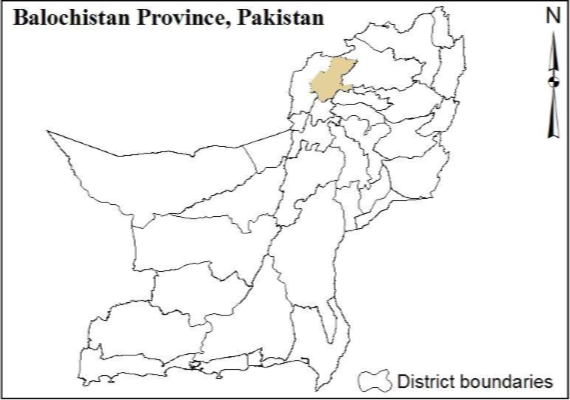

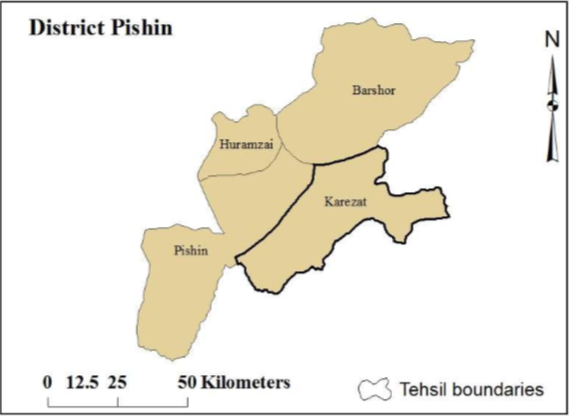

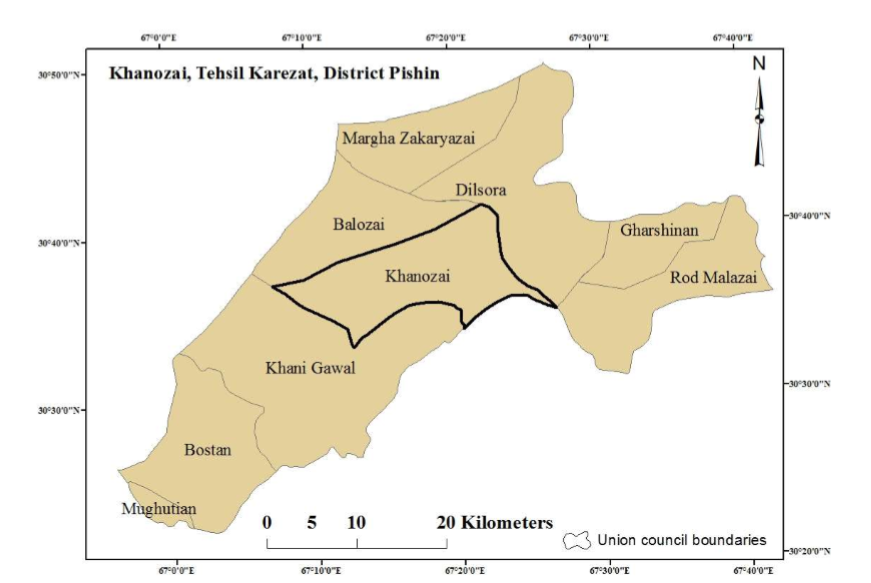

== Demographics ==
=== Population ===
Historical population
Year	Pop.	±% p.a.
1951	...	—
1961	...	—
1972	...	—
1981	...	—
1998	...	—
2017	39,997	—
2023	46,682	+2.61%

The population of city in 2017 was 39,997 but according to the 2023 Census of Pakistan, the population has risen to 46,682.

Languages

Languages of Khanozai (2023 Census)
1. Pashto (99.8%)
2. Urdu (0.10%)
3. Others (0.10%)
