= Maruf District =

Maruf District معروف
- District
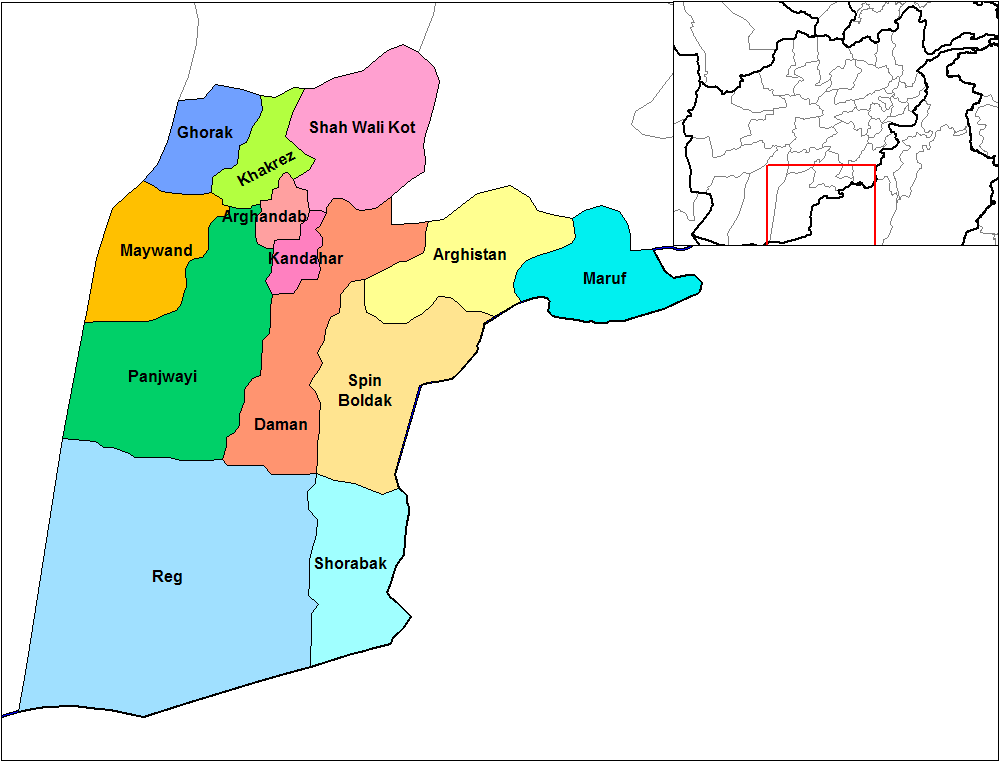
- Maruf District as viewed on a map of districts in Kandahar

- Location in Afghanistan
- Country: Afghanistan
- Province: Kandahar Province
- Occupation: Taliban

Population (2006)
  - Total: 200,000
- Time zone: + 4.30

Maruf District (Pashto: معروف) also Ma'ruf or Maroof, is a district in Kandahar Province, Afghanistan. It borders Arghistan District to the west, Zabul Province to the north and Pakistan to the east and south. The population was 200,000 in 2006. The district center is the town of Maruf, located in the northern part of the district. It is a boundary mountainous district with many rugged mountain passes towards Pakistan. It is located almost 190 km from any provincial city. This district has 360 villages. It has very agricultural land.

This district has a different history from other places for pashton tribes: the old name of this and Arghistan districts was Arakozia 2300 years ago. Before the government of King Amir Abdurahman Khan, the boundary of Maruf District was then pishin bazar of Balochistan district. When Durand signed, areas like Zhob, Qlalqala Saifullah, and Tobah became part of Pakistan.

There are living that Pashton tribes which come into the world here like Barakzai, Alizai, Kakar Osean, Alokozai, Ishaqzai, Khog Yani, Sydan, Adizai, etc.

Afghan emperor Ahmad Sha Baba lived in Maruf District during his last years.

This district has two famous rivers; one river is between mountains of samee and bayek also called in geographic books by the name of Maruf Arghistan River and other name is Qadani River, between Afghanistan and Pakistan. Border length of this district of Pakistan is 155 km.

On February 22, 2018, Taliban forces captured the center of the district.
