= Pishin District =

District in Balochistan, Pakistan

Coordinates: 30°40′N 66°50′E

Pishin District پښين ولسوالۍ
- District of Balochistan
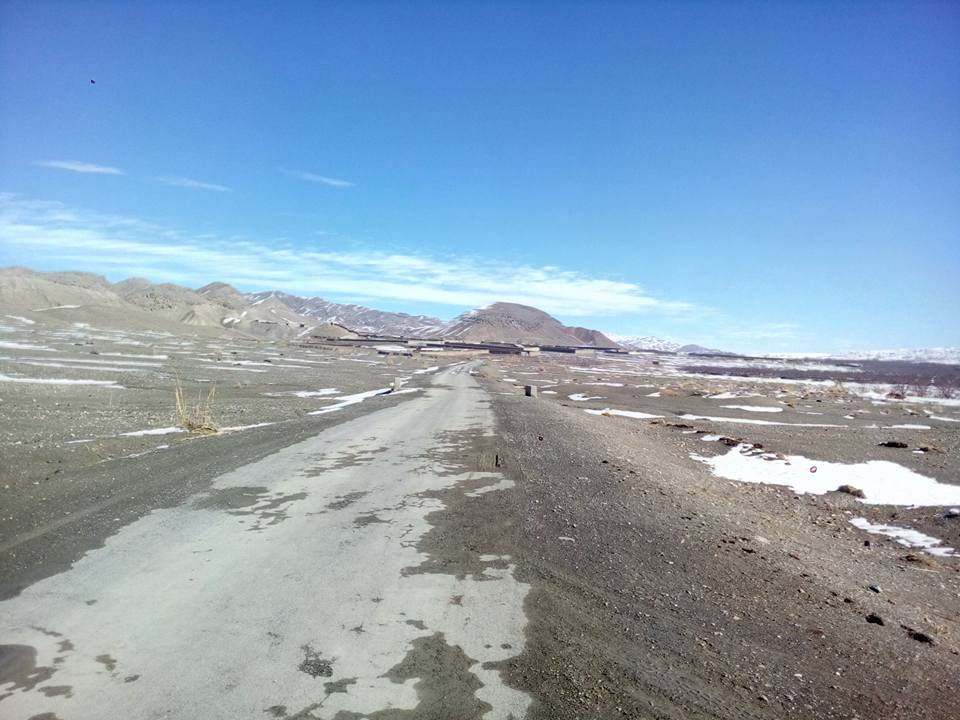
- View of Bala Niganda Village

- Map of Balochistan with Pishin District highlighted
- Country: Pakistan
- Province: Balochistan
- Division: Pashin
- Headquarters: Pishin

Government
  - Type: District Administration
  - Deputy Commissioner: Zahid Khan
  - District Police Officer: N/A
  - District Health Officer: N/A

Area
  - District of Balochistan: 6,218 km^{2} (2,401 sq mi)
- Elevation: 1,555 m (5,102 ft)

Population (2023)
  - District of Balochistan: 835,482
  - Density: 134.4/km^{2} (348.0/sq mi)
  - Urban: 243,785 (29.18%)
  - Rural: 591,697 (70.82%)

Literacy
  - Literacy rate: Total: (51.07%); Male: (65.85%); Female: (36.05%)
- Time zone: UTC+5 (PST)
- Calling code: 826
- National Assembly Seats (2023): Total (1): MMA (1)
- Balochistan Assembly Seats (2023): Total (3): MMA (2); PPP (1)
- Number of Tehsils: 5
- Website: quetta.balochistan.gov.pk/district-pishin/

Pishin (Pashto: پښين; IPA: pʂin/pçin) is a district in the Balochistan province of Pakistan. Pishin District is located at 45 km² from the provincial headquarters, Quetta. In 1975, it was bifurcated from Quetta District, while in 1993 part of it was split off to form the new district of Killa Abdullah.

Again in 2022, part of it created the new district of Karezat. Myth attributes the origin of the Persian designation to a son of the mythical Emperor Afrasiab. The population of Pishin District was 300,000 in 2005.

== Administration ==
Pishin District is subdivided into five tehsils or sub-districts:

Tehsil	Area (km²)	Pop. (2023)	Density (ppl/km²) (2023)	Literacy rate (2023)	Union Councils
Barshore Tehsil	2,288	141,994	62.06	47.61%	...
Hurramzai Tehsil	418	147,844	353.69	39.67%	...
Pishin Tehsil	1,199	325,641	271.59	52.50%	...
Saranan Tehsil	83	65,157	785.02	48.33%	...
Bostan Tehsil	186	49,721	267.32	45.19%	...

== Demographics ==
Historical population
Year	Pop.	±% p.a.
1961	58,957	—
1972	131,923	+7.60%
1981	202,256	+4.86%
1998	367,183	+3.57%
2017	736,903	+3.73%
2023	835,482	+2.11%

As of the 2023 census, Pishin district has 147,185 households and a population of 835,482. The district has a sex ratio of 104.34 males to 100 females and a literacy rate of 51.07%: 65.85% for males and 36.05% for females. 318,031 (38.07% of the surveyed population) are under 10 years of age. 243,785 (29.18%) live in urban areas. 2,441 (0.29% of the surveyed population) are religious minorities, mainly Christians. Pashto is the predominant language, spoken by 99.07% of the population.

Pishin's main ethnic groups are Pashtuns who belong to the Tareen, Sayed, Kakar, and Achakzai tribes. However, the Tareen tribe is known to be the ruling one among them.

Religious groups in Pishin City (1941 & 2017)
Religious group	1941		2017	
Religious group	Pop.	%	Pop.	%
Islam	1,245	65.87%	35,067	98.65%
Hinduism	447	23.65%	233	0.66%
Sikhism	183	9.68%	—N/a	—N/a
Christianity	15	0.79%	473	1.33%
Ahmadiyya	—N/a	—N/a	4	0.01%
Total population	1,890	100%	35,547	100%

Religious groups in Quetta–Pishin District (British Baluchistan era)
Religious group	1901		1911		1921		1931		1941	
Religious group	Pop.	%	Pop.	%	Pop.	%	Pop.	%	Pop.	%
Islam	96,600	84.67%	106,702	83.59%	103,456	75.47%	107,945	73.16%	113,288	72.49%
Hinduism	11,752	10.3%	13,746	10.77%	22,300	16.27%	26,718	18.11%	28,629	18.32%
Christianity	3,743	3.28%	4,564	3.58%	6,139	4.48%	7,370	5%	5,441	3.48%
Sikhism	1,798	1.58%	2,430	1.9%	4,848	3.54%	5,255	3.56%	8,787	5.62%
Zoroastrianism	151	0.13%	137	0.11%	151	0.11%	161	0.11%	73	0.05%
Judaism	43	0.04%	47	0.04%	16	0.01%	15	0.01%	11	0.01%
Jainism	0	0%	9	0.01%	8	0.01%	32	0.02%	7	0%
Buddhism	—N/a	—N/a	12	0.01%	159	0.12%	40	0.03%	42	0.03%
Tribal	—N/a	—N/a	—N/a	—N/a	—N/a	—N/a	0	0%	0	0%
Others	0	0%	1	0%	5	0%	5	0%	11	0.01%
Total population	114,087	100%	127,648	100%	137,082	100%	147,541	100%	156,289	100%
Note: British Baluchistan era district borders are not an exact match in the present-day due to various bifurcations to district borders — which since created new districts — throughout the region during the post-independence era that have taken into account population increases.

== Agriculture and farming ==
The main crops in the area are wheat, barley, corn (maize), potatoes, grapes, apple, pomegranate, almond, apricot, plum and peach which are grown in the valleys. Sheep and goats are also herded.

== Notable people ==
- Qazi Muhammad Essa, Senior Leader of the Pakistan Movement and a close associate of Quaid-e-Azam
- Jennifer Musa, Politician and Social worker
- Ashraf Jehangir Qazi, Diplomat, former Pakistani Ambassador to United States
- Qazi Faez Isa, Chief Justice Pakistan Supreme Court

== See also ==
- Khanozai
- Barshore
- Killa Abdullah
- Districts of Pakistan
  - Districts of Khyber Pakhtunkhwa, Pakistan
  - Districts of Punjab, Pakistan
  - Districts of Balochistan, Pakistan
  - Districts of Sindh, Pakistan
  - Districts of Azad Kashmir
  - Districts of Gilgit-Baltistan

== Bibliography ==
- 1998 District census report of Pishin. Census publication. Vol. 113. Islamabad: Population Census Organization, Statistics Division, Government of Pakistan. 2000.
