= Gulistan, Balochistan =

Gulistan گلستان
- Town
- Location within Balochistan, Pakistan Location within Pakistan
- Coordinates: 30.36°N 66.35°E
- Country: Pakistan
- Province: Balochistan
- Elevation: 1,481 m (4,859 ft)

Population (2010)
  - Total: 54,700
- Time zone: UTC+5 (PST)
- Calling code: 0826
- Number of Union councils: 5

Gulistan (Pashto and Urdu: گلستان) is a town and tehsil headquarters of the Qilla Abdullah District in the Balochistan province of Pakistan. It is located 8 kilometres (5 miles) from the Pakistan-Afghanistan border. Gulistan envelopes many tribes like the Achakzais, Kakars, Tareens and Syeds. It is located at 30°36'26"N, 66°35'2"E at an elevation of 1,481 metres (4,862 feet). Gulistan has a reputation for its fresh fruit.

== Fiction ==
Gulistan served as partial inspiration for the land of Afghulistan in the Conan the Barbarian mythos.

== See also ==
- List of cities of Pakistan
- List of cities of Balochistan
