= Killa Abdullah =

Town in Balochistan, Pakistan

Killa Abdullah قلعہ عبداللہ Qilla Abdullah
- City
- Location within Balochistan, Pakistan Location within Pakistan
- Coordinates: 30°43′44″N 66°39′41″E
- Country: Pakistan
- Province: (Balochistan, Pakistan) Balochistan
- District: Killa Abdullah
- Tehsil: Killa Abdullah
- Elevation: 1,561 m (5,121 ft)

Population (2023)
  - City: 35,384
- Time zone: UTC+5 (PST)
- Highways: N-50

Killa Abdullah (also spelled Qilla Abdullah or Abdullah Qilla) is a town in Balochistan, Pakistan. It serves as the administrative centre of Killa Abdullah District and is the headquarters of Killa Abdullah Tehsil, one of the district's subdivisions.

== Demographics ==
=== Population ===
Historical population
Year	Pop.	±% p.a.
2017	26,151	—
2023	35,384	+5.17%

As of the 2023 census, Killa Abdullah has population of 35,384.

== See also ==
- Qilla Abdullah railway station
- List of cities in Pakistan by population
  - List of cities in Balochistan by population
