= Killa Abdullah District =

District in Balochistan, Pakistan

Coordinates: 30.612°N 66.576°E

Kila Abdullah District ضلع قلعہ عبداللہ عبدالله کلا ولسوالۍ قلعه عبدالله دمگ
- District of Balochistan
- Map of with Kila Abdullah District District highlighted
- Country: Pakistan
- Province: Balochistan
- Division: Quetta
- Established: 1993
- Headquarters: Gulistan

Government
  - Type: District Administration
  - Deputy Commissioner: Muhammad Asghar Harifal
  - District Police Officer: N/A
  - District Health Officer: N/A

Area
  - District of Balochistan: 3,553 km^{2} (1,372 sq mi)

Population (2023)
  - District of Balochistan: 361,971
  - Density: 102/km^{2} (260/sq mi)
  - Urban: 35,384 (9.77%)
  - Rural: 326,587 (90.23%)

Literacy
  - Literacy rate: Total: (36.40%); Male: (47.28%); Female: (24.70%)
- Time zone: UTC+5 (PST)
- Number of Tehsils: 4

Kila Abdullah District or Qilla Abdullah (Pashto: عبدالله کلا ولسوالۍ) is a district in the northwestern part of Balochistan province of Pakistan.

Kila Abdullah was separated from Pishin District and made a new district in June 1993.

The district is located within the heartland of the many tribes consisting mainly of Tareen, Kakar and Achakzai (Bor Tareen) Pashtuns and other smaller tribes, such as Syed, etc.

== Topography ==
Kila Abdullah district lies between 30 and 04' to 31–17' North Longitude in the foothills of the Shela Bagh Mountain range. It is bordered by Pishin District in the east, Quetta District in the South and by Afghanistan in the west. The geographical area of the district is 5,264 km^{2}. It is composed of two sub-divisions; Gulistan and Chaman. The general character of the district is mountainous. Its northern area is covered by the Toba Plateau. The hill ranges are fairly uniform in character. They consist of long central ridges with numerous spurs. These spurs vary in elevation from 1,500 to 3,300 metres.

=== Soil ===
Kila Abdullah is a small valley bordered by mountains. The valley floor is covered with unconsolidated alluvial sediments that are mostly composed of clay, silt, silty clay and clayey silt. All these sediments were deposited in the valley by the seasonal streams that flow across the valley (generally north to south). The soil is of loamy nature in the Gulistan area, while the soil of Tehsil Chaman is sandy clay—gravel (admixture). The sandy fraction increases towards the mountain ranges. The scarcity of water in the area and the semi-desert climatic conditions have limited trees and shrubs to grow.

=== Climate ===
The climate of the district Kila Abdullah is generally dry and temperate. The adjoining districts have somewhat deviating temperatures, owing to different elevations. The climatic conditions of the district are particularly suitable for horticulture/ agriculture. The climate is especially suitable for the growth of fruits e.g. apples, apricots, peaches, plums, grapes, cherries and vegetables such as potatoes, onions, tomatoes.

== History ==
In 1839, this area along with Quetta and Pishin region became a part of British India as a result of the First Anglo Afghan War. However, in 1842, the Afghans reoccupied the entire Pishin Valley, losing it again in 1879. Four years later, Pishin and the surrounding areas were merged with Quetta district. In 1993, it was separated from Pishin for administrative reasons and was given the status of a district.

== Demographics ==
=== Population ===
Historical population
Year	Pop.	±% p.a.
1961	40,286	—
1972	69,539	+5.09%
1981	107,493	+4.96%
1998	218,415	+4.26%
2017	323,793	+2.09%
2023	361,971	+1.88%

As of the 2023 census, Killa Abdullah district has 67,289 households and a population of 361,971. The district has a sex ratio of 109.49 males to 100 females and a literacy rate of 36.40%: 47.28% for males and 24.70% for females. 133,643 (36.92% of the surveyed population) are under 10 years of age. 35,384 (9.78%) live in urban areas. 1,298 (0.36% of the surveyed population) are religious minorities, mainly Christians.

=== Languages ===
Pashto is the predominant language, spoken by 99.24% of the population.

== Administrative subdivisions ==
The district is administratively subdivided into the following tehsils:

Tehsil	Area (km^{2})	Pop. (2023)	Density (ppl/km^{2}) (2023)	Literacy rate (2023)	Union Councils
Gulistan Tehsil	1,536	126,474	82.34	36.12%	...
Killa Abdullah Tehsil	413	165,738	401.30	44.00%	...
Dobandi Tehsil	1,604	69,759	43.49	18.10%	...

== Education ==
According to the Pakistan District Education Rankings 2017, district Kila Abdullah is ranked at number 111 out of the 141 ranked districts in Pakistan on the education score index. This index considers learning, gender parity and retention in the district.

Literacy rate in 2014–15 of population 10 years and older in the district stands at 27% whereas for females it is only 8%.

Post primary access is a major issue in the district with 87% schools being at primary level. Compare this with high schools which constitute only 6% of government schools in the district. This is also reflected in the enrolment figures for 2016–17 with 19,087 students enrolled in class 1 to 5 and only 234 students enrolled in class 9 and 10.

Gender disparity is another issue in the district. Only 15% schools in the district are girls’ schools. Access to education for girls is a major issue in the district and is also reflected in the low literacy rates for females.

Moreover, the schools in the district lack basic facilities. According to Alif Ailaan district education rankings 2017, the district is ranked at number 121 out of the 155 districts of Pakistan for primary school infrastructure. At the middle school level, it is ranked at number 113 out of the 155 districts. These rankings take into account the basic facilities available in schools including drinking water, working toilet, availability of electricity, existence of a boundary wall and general building condition. 7 out of 10 schools do not have electricity in them. 3 out 5 schools lack a toilet and 2 out of 5 schools do not have a boundary wall. 1 out of 2 schools do not have clean drinking water.

== Sites of interest ==
- Khojak Tunnel

== See also ==
- List of cities in Pakistan by population
  - List of cities in Balochistan by population
  - List of cities in Khyber Pakhtunkhwa by population
  - List of cities in Sindh by population
  - List of cities in Punjab, Pakistan by population
  - List of cities in Azad Jammu & Kashmir by population
  - List of cities in Gilgit-Baltistan by population

== Bibliography ==
- 1998 District census report of Killa Abdullah. Census publication. Vol. 121. Islamabad: Population Census Organization, Statistics Division, Government of Pakistan. 2000.
