= Achakzai =

Durrani Pashtun tribe

The Achakzai (Pashto: اڅکزی) are a Durrani Pashtun tribe that resides on both sides of the Durand Line, centered in Killa Abdullah District in Pakistan with some clans as far away as Afghanistan's Kandahar Province as well as Firuzkuh in Iran.

== Identity ==
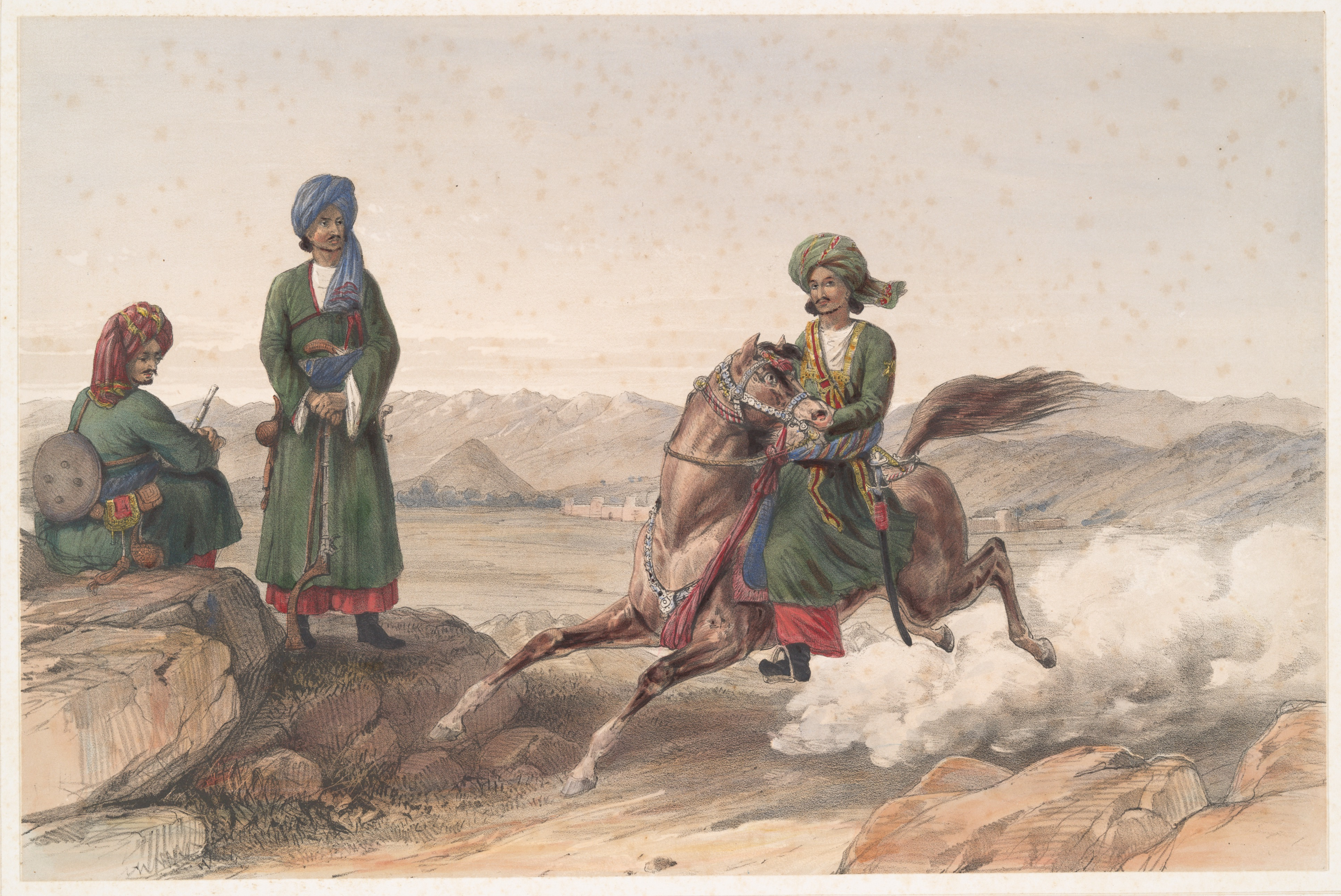
The fort of Killeh Abdooleh, and troopers of the Auchukzye Horse in 1842, as sketched by James Atkinson

The Achakzai is a section of the larger Zirak Durrani tribe. Their name comes from the fact that they trace agnatic (patrilineal) descent from Achak Khan - the paternal grandson of Barak Khan, from whom are descended the Barakzai tribe of Pashtuns; thus, the Achakzai are a branch or sept of the Barakzai, who are themselves a branch of the Zirak Durrani tribe.

They are divided into two sub-tribes, namely:

- Gujanzai (whose branches are Hameedzai, Khawajazai, Ashezai, Nusratzai, Malezai, Usmanzai)
- Badinzai (whose branches are Yonus, Ghabizai, Kakozai, Shamshozai, Panizai, Piralizai Shabozai, Badizai)

== Notable people ==
- senator Abdul shakoor khan achakzai is a senator in the senate of Pakistan from 2024 onwards. he belongs to ghabizai sub tribe of achakzai . he's from gulistan in district killa abdullah balochistan. he's a prominent leader in jamiat uluma e islam party.
- Mahmood Khan Achakzai (born 1948), Pashtun nationalist politician and chairman of Pakhtunkhwa Milli Awami Party
- Abdul Samad Khan Achakzai, Pashtun nationalist revolutionary and resistance leader
- Jan Achakzai (born 1970), Pakistani politician
- Abdul Raziq Achakzai (1979–2018), Afghan police chief who joined anti-Taliban forces in the 2001 Afghan War
- Abdullah Khan Achakzai, Afghan leader who fought against the British Raj, During the First Anglo-Afghan War. Balochistan's city Qila Abdullah is named after him.
- Ismatullah Muslim, a general who participated during the Soviet-Afghan War. First at the side of the Mujahideen, but later defected to the DRA.
- Mullah Abdur Razzaq Achakzai, a Taliban commander who partook in the fight against ISAF coalition forces during the battle of Marjah.
- Mohammad Abbas Akhund, Afghan-Taliban politician serving as of 2021 as Acting Minister of Disaster Management.
- Muhammad Essa, Pakistani footballer
- Kaleemullah Khan, Pakistani footballer
- Mohammad Hasan Rahmani, former Taliban governor of Kandahar province from 1994 to 2001.

== See also ==
- Pashtun people
- Pashtun tribes
