= List of named passenger trains of Pakistan =

This article contains a list of named passenger trains in Pakistan.

Train Name	Railroad	Train Endpoints	Operated	Train Numbers
Akbar Express	PR	Quetta – Lahore Junction	1974 – 2020	23UP/24DN
Allama Iqbal Express	PR	Karachi Cantonment – Sialkot Junction	1940 – Present	9UP/10DN
Attock Passenger	PR	Mari Indus – Attock City Junction	1988 – Present	201UP/202DN
Attock Safari	PK.Unicorn	Rawalpindi – Attock Khurd	2021-2022, 2024-Present	UP/DN
Awam Express	PR	Karachi Cantonment – Peshawar Cantonment	1974-2022, 2023-Present	13UP/14DN
Abaseen Railcar	PR	Rawalpindi – Peshawar	Suspended	-
Abaseen Express	PR	Peshawar Cantonment – Quetta	1986 - 1998	-
Amruka Mixed	PR	Samasata Junction – Amruka	Suspended	317UP/318DN
Babu Passenger	PR	Lahore Junction – Lala Musa Junction	1978-2020, 2026-Present	205UP/206DN
Badar Express	NCS Rails	Lahore Junction – Faisalabad	1988 – Present	111UP/112DN
Badin Express	PR	Hyderabad Junction – Badin	1962-2020	179UP/180DN
Bhambhore Express	PR	Rawalpindi – Karachi City	2007-2009	53UP/54DN
Bahauddin Zakaria Express	PR	Karachi City – Multan Cantonment	1986-2022, 2023-Present	25UP/26DN
Bahawalpur Express	PR	Samasata Junction – Sialkot Junction	Suspended	143UP/144DN
Balochistan Express	PR	Quetta – Karachi City	1998-2012	-
Bau Passenger	PR	Malakwal Junction – Lahore Junction	Suspended	-
Bolan Mail	PR	Karachi City – Quetta	1948–2020, 2021-2022, 2023-present	3UP/4DN
Budhal Faqeer Express	PR	Jacobabad – Rohri Junction	2002-Suspended	169UP/170DN
Bulleh Shah Passenger	PR	Pakpattan – Lahore Junction	2011-Suspended, 2026-Present	257UP/258DN
Buraq Express	PR	Karachi City – Rawalpindi	2006 - 2010	-
Chaman Passenger	PR	Quetta – Chaman	1958 – Present	221UP/222DN
Chenab Express	PR	Sargodha Junction – Lala Musa Junction	1985-2020, 2022-Present	135UP/136DN
Chotiari Mixed	PR	Mirpur Khas - Kotri Junction	Suspended	305UP/306DN
Chiltan Express	PR	Faisalabad – Quetta	1973 - 2009	21UP/22DN
Dachi Express	PR	Faisalabad – Lahore Junction	Suspended	221UP/222DN
DGK Shuttle	PR	Multan Cantt – Dera Ghazi Khan	2025-Present	227UP/228DN
Faiz Ahmed Faiz Passenger	PR	Lahore Junction – Narowal Junction	2014 – Present	209UP/210DN
Faisal Express	PR	Lahore Junction – Faisalabad	2018–2020	119UP/120DN
Faisalabad Express	PR	Multan Cantonment – Faisalabad	2018– 2020	173UP/174DN
Fareed Express	PR	Karachi City – Lahore Junction	2002 – Present	37UP/38DN
Ghouri Express	NCS Rails	Lahore Junction – Faisalabad	1981 – present	113UP/114DN
Green Line	PR	Karachi Cantonment – Margalla	2015-2022, 2023-Present	5UP/6DN
Gannun Express	PR	Lahore Junction – Narowal Junction	Suspended	-
Gharibwal Passenger	PR	Gharibwal – Malakwal Junction	Suspended	341UP/342DN
Hazara Express	PR	Karachi City – Havelian	2006 – Present	11UP/12DN
Hyderabad Express	PR	Hyderabad Junction – Mirpur Khas	Suspended	163UP/164DN
Harnai Passenger	PR	Sibi Junction – Harnai	2023-2024	223UP/224DN
Hashim Shah Passenger	PR	Narowal Junction – Lahore Junction	Suspended	-
Islamabad Express	PR	Lahore Junction – Islamabad	2004 – Present	107UP/108DN
Jaffar Express	PR	Peshawar – Quetta	2003 – Present	39UP/40DN
Jand Passenger	PR	Jand Junction – Attock City Junction	1998 – Present	203UP/204DN
Jinnah Express	PR	Karachi Cantonment – Lahore Cantonment	2019–2021	31UP/32DN
Jacobabad Passenger	PR	Multan Cantt – Jacobabad Junction	Suspended	-
Karachi Express	PR	Karachi City – Lahore Junction	1943 – present	15UP/16DN
Kohat Express	PR	Rawalpindi - Kohat	2018–Present	133UP/134DN
Karakoram Express	PR	Karachi Cantonment – Lahore Junction	2002 – Present	41UP/42DN
Khushhal Khan Khattak Express	PR	Karachi City – Peshawar Cantonment	1962-2020,2025-Present	19UP/20DN
Khyber Mail	PR	Karachi Cantonment – Peshawar Cantonment	1920–Present	1UP/2DN
Kundian Passenger	PR	Kundian Junction – Sargodha Junction	Suspended	241UP/242DN
Khewra Mixed	PR	Khewra – Malakwal Junction	Suspended	343UP/344DN
Koh I Noor Passenger	PR	Lahore Junction – Narowal Junction	Suspended	333UP/334DN
Khush Khuram Passenger	PR	Narowal Junction – Lahore Junction	Suspended	-
Kotri Express	PR	Mirpur Khas – Kotri Junction	Suspended	-
Kasur Passenger	PR	Lahore Junction – Pakpattan	Suspended	321UP/322DN
Karana Passenger	PR	Lala Musa Junction - – Sargodha Junction	2019 - 2020	353UP/354DN
Lasani Express	PR	Lahore Junction – Sialkot Junction	1999 – Present	125UP/126DN
Lala Musa Express	PR	Lala Musa Junction – Sargodha Junction	Suspended	137UP/138DN
Landi Passenger	PR	Rohri Junction – Khanewal Junction	Suspended	
Lodhran Passenger	PR	Multan Cantt – Lodhran Junction	Suspended	
Margalla Express	PR	Lahore Junction – Rawalpindi	2006-2020	109UP/110DN
Marala Passenger	PR	Wazirabad Junction – Narowal Junction	Suspended	227UP/228DN
Mouj Darya Express	PR	Narowal Junction – Lahore Junction	Suspended	-
Mari Indus Passenger	PR	Mari Indus – Multan Cantonment	2010-Suspended	219UP/220DN
Mianwali Express	PR	Mari Indus – Lahore Junction	2019–Present	147UP/148DN
Multan Express	PR	Multan Cantonment – Lahore Junction	2004-2020	117UP/118DN
Mehran Express	PR	Karachi City - Mirpur Khas	2018–Present	149UP/150DN
Musa Pak Express	PR	Multan Cantonment – Lahore Junction	1986 – Present	115UP/116DN
Meher Express	PR	Multan Cantonment – Rawalpindi	2004 – Present	127UP/128DN
Mohenjo-Daro Passenger	PR	Karachi City – Kotri Junction	2018–Present	213UP/214DN
Millat Express	PR	Karachi Cantonment – Lala Musa Junction	2004 – Present	17UP/18DN
Malakwal Passenger	PR	Sargodha Junction – Malakwal Junction	Suspended	
Marvi Express	PR	Mirpur Khas - Khokhropar	2006-2020, 2021-Present	271UP/272DN
Mixed Passenger	PR	Sargodha Junction – Lala Musa Junction	Suspended	-
Miani Passenger	PR	Malakwal Junction – Bhera	Suspended	249UP/250DN
Nishter Express	PR	Multan Cantonment – Lahore Junction	2006 - 2011	-
Narowal Passenger	PR	Narowal Junction – Lahore Junction	2018–Present	209UP/210DN
Noor Shah Mixed	PR	Faisalabad - – Lahore Junction	Suspended	325UP/326DN
Okara Passenger	PR	Okara – Lahore Junction	2003-Suspended	223UP/224DN
Pak Business Express	PR	Karachi Cantonment – Lahore Junction	2012 – Present	33UP/34DN
Pakistan Express	PR	Karachi Cantonment – Rawalpindi	2006 – Present	45UP/46DN
Pakpattan Express	PR	Pakpattan – Samasata Junction	Suspended	-
Pind Dadan Khan Shuttle	PR	Pind Dadan Khan – Lala Musa Junction	2015-2022, 2023-Present	274DN/275UP
Peshawar Passenger	PR	Peshawar Cantonment – Lahore Junction	Suspended	
Qalander Express	PR	Kotri Junction – Larkana Junction	2008 - Suspended	165UP/166DN
Ravi Express (Pakistan)	PR	Lahore Junction – Shorkot Cantonment Junction	Present	121UP/122DN
Rohi Express	PR	Khanpur – Rawalpindi	1979-2012	131UP/132DN
Rohi Express	PR	Khanpur – Sukkur	2018–2020	215UP/216DN
Rawal Express	PR	Lahore Junction – Rawalpindi	2004-Present	105UP/106DN
Rehman Baba Express	PR	Peshawar Cantonment – Karachi Cantonment	2018–Present	47UP/48DN
Rawalpindi Passenger	PR	Havelian – Rawalpindi	2006-Present	267UP/268DN
Rawalpindi Express	PR	Lahore – Rawalpindi	2006 - 2012, 2018–2019	109UP/110DN
Sakhi Abbas Express	PR	Pattoki – Lahore Junction	2009-Suspended	263UP/264DN
Sargodha Shuttle	PR	Sargodha Junction – Lala Musa Junction	2015-2022, 2023-Present	277UP/278DN
Shah Hussain Express	PR	Karachi Cantonment – Lahore Junction	2013-2022, 2025-Suspended	43UP/44DN
Shahbaz Passenger	PR	Dadu – Larkana Junction		309UP/310DN
Samjhauta Express	PR	Lahore – Wagah	1976 - 2019	1UP/2DN
Saman Sarkar Express	PR	Hyderabad Junction – Mirpur Khas	2021-Present	155UP/156DN
Sandal Express	PR	Sargodha Junction – Multan Cantonment	2020-Suspended, 2026-Present	139UP/140DN
Sargodha Express	PR	Sargodha Junction – Lahore Junction	2020-Suspended	123UP/124DN
Shalimar Express	PR	Karachi Cantonment – Lahore Junction	1979-2010, 2012-2022, 2023- Present	27UP28DN
Sialkot Express	PR	Lahore Junction – Wazirabad Junction	2006-2009, 2025 - Present	171UP/172DN
Shaheen Passenger	PR	Wazirabad Junction – Sialkot Junction	Present	225UP/226DN
Subak Kharam	PR	Lahore Junction – Rawalpindi	2004–Present	103UP/104DN
Shah Rukn-e-Alam Express	PR	Multan Cantonment – Karachi Cantonment	2002 - 2011	-
Subak Raftar	PR	Lahore Junction – Islamabad	2004–Present	101UP/102DN
Sukkur Express	PR	Karachi City – Jacobabad Junction	1972 – Present	145UP/146DN
Sultan Bahu Express	PR	Shorkot Cantonment Junction – Lahore Junction	Suspended	-
Shah Shamas Express	PR	Multan Cantonment – Lahore Junction	2002 - Suspended	-
Shahsawar Passenger	PR	Sialkot Junction – Lahore Junction	Suspended	217UP/218DN
Sindh Express	PR	Karachi Cantonment – Multan Cantonment	2018-2020	29UP/30DN
Super Express	PR	Karachi Cantonment – Malakwal Junction	1970-2012	33UP/34DN
Sir Syed Express	Raas Logistics	Karachi Cantonment – Rawalpindi	2019-2022,2024-2025	35UP/36DN
Shah Latif Express	PR	Karachi City – Mirpur Khas	2018-Present	151UP/152DN
Tezgam	PR	Karachi Cantonment – Rawalpindi	1953 – Present	7UP/8DN
Thall Express	PR	Multan Cantonment – Rawalpindi	1995-2011, 2019–2020, 2022-Present	129UP/130DN
Tezrao Express	PR	Karachi Cantonment – Peshawar Cantonment	Suspended	-
Tipu Sultan Express	PR	Multan Cantonment – Rawalpindi	2002-2009	-
Thar Express	PR	Karachi Cantonment – Zero Point	2007-2019	405UP/406DN
Waris Shah Passenger	PR	Lahore Junction – Shorkot Cantonment Junction	1990 – Present	207UP/208DN
Wazirabad Passenger	PR	Faisalabad – Wazirabad Junction		235UP/236DN
Zahedan Mixed Passenger	PR	Quetta – Zahedan	1998 – 2008	-
Zarghoon Express	PR	Quetta – Jacobabad	2002 – Suspended	301UP/302DN

== See also ==
- Pakistan Railways
