= List of roads in Multan =

This is the list of roads in Multan.

== Along with Motorways ==
Name	Extension		Nearby Places
Name	From	To	Nearby Places
Lahore Road	Multan	Lahore	Khanewal, Sahiwal, Chichawatni
Khanewal Road	Chungi No.9	Khanewal	Chungi No.9, Eid Gah Mosque, Ghaziabad, Raheedabad, Chowk Kumhaaranwala, Multan Fertilizer Factory
Vehari Road	Kumhaar Mandi	Vehari	Walaitabad, Chowk Shah Abbas, Mumtazabad, Vehari Chowk, Kot Rab Nawaz, Malsi
Muzaffargarh Road	Aziz Hotel	Muzaffargarh	Sher Shah road, Muzaffarabad, Chenab River
GT Road	Multan	Bahawalpur	Lodhran
Nawabpur Road	Chungi no.5	Nawabpur	Lodhi Colony, Sooraj Miani
Old Shujabad Road	Nusrat Road	Shujabad	Kumhaar Mandi, Bilal Chowk, Nag Shah Chowk

== Other populated roads ==
Name	Extension		Nearby Places
Name	From	To	Nearby Places
Bosan Road	Chungi No.9	Bahauddin Zakariya University	Chungi No.9, Gulgasht Colony, Gol Baagh, Zakariya Town, Bosan Town, Chungi No.9
Abdali Road	S.P Chowk	Ghanta Ghar	Nawah Sheher, Fawara Chowk
Nusrat Road	Bomanji Chowk	S.P Chowk	Multan Cantt, Radio Pakistan
Nishtar Road	Nishtar Chowk	Chungi No.1	Nishtar Hospital, Nishtar Chowk Flyover, Nishtar Medical College
Sher Shah Road	Dera Adda	Sher Shah Interchange	Aziz Hotel, Cantonment Garden, Jheel, Garden Town, Muzaffarabad
Sooraj Miani Road	Chungi No.1	Nawabpur Road	Multan International Airport, Gulshan-e-Sakhi Sultan, Jaffarabad
LMQ Road	Kalma Chowk	Chungi No.9	Sports ground Kachehri, Chungi No.8
Old Bahawalpur Road	S.P Chowk	Kalma Chowk	Tariq Road
Jail Road	Multan Cantt	Soraj Miani	Chungi No.1, Nishtar Institute of Dentistry
MDA Road	Kalma Chowk	MDA Chowk	State Bank of Pakistan, Multan Arts Council
Khooni Burj Road	Haram Gate	Chungi No.14	Pak Gate, Khooni Burj
Masoom Shah Road	Dolat Gate	Chowk Kumharanwala	Bismillah Chowk, Gulshan Market
Kachehri Road	Chowk Kachehri	Ghanta Ghar Chowk	Rehma Center, Multan Kitaab Ghar
Hazoori Bagh Road	Ghanta Ghar Chowk	Chungi No.9	Dreamland Cinema
Mall Road	Quied-e-Azam Road	Bomanji Chowk	Mall Plaza, Nusrat Road
Quied-e-Azam Road	Multan Cantt	Ghoora Chowk	Multan Cantt, Post office, Cantonment garden
Tipu Sultan Road	Multan Cantt	Ghoora Chowk	Army Head Quarters, Talha Road
Qasim Bela Road	Multan Cantt	Qasim Bela	SSS Line, Multan International Airport
Airport Road	Empiral Chowk	Chungi No.1	CMH Multan, Ayub Stadium, Multan International Airport, Lagaryal
Aurangzeb Road	Tipu Sultan Road	Grass Mandi	Quied-e-Azam Road, Sher Shah Road
Qasim Road	Emperial Chowk	S.P Chowk	Lalak Jaan Shaheed Park, Khan Plaza, Multan Church
Gujjar Khadda Road	Multan Cantt	Dera Adda	Afshar Colony, Tasty Hotel
Railway Road	Aziz Hotel	Haram Gate	Cantt Railway Station, Saddu Hasaam, Lakar Mandi, Chowk Shaheedan
Faizi Road	Walaitabad	Lakar Mandi Road	Cantt Railway Station, Lakar Mandi
Hassan Parwana Road	Dera Adda	Bohar Gate	Post Office, Graveyard
Tariq Road	Abdali Road	Old Bahawalpur Road	Altaf Town, Officers Colony
Koosar Road	Chowk Shaheedan	Haram Gate	Multan City railway station

== See also ==
- List of places in Multan
