= Multan Cantt =

Cantonment in Punjab, Pakistan

Multan Cantonment

Coordinates: 30.18°N 71.46°E
- Country: Pakistan
- Province: Punjab
- District: Multan
- Time Zone: PST
- PIN: 60000
- Website: www.multan.gov.pk
- Built: July 1961

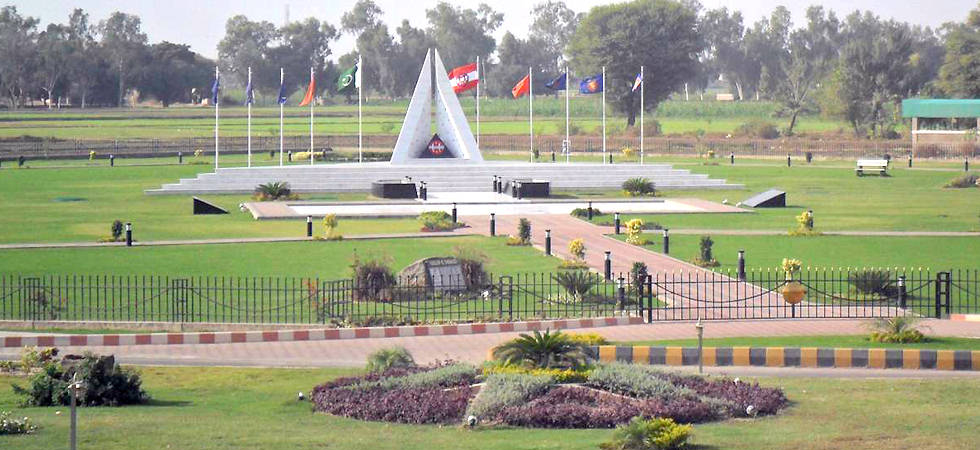

Yaadgaar-e-Shauhda at Sher Shah Road, Multan Cantt

Multan Cantonment (Urdu: ملتان چھاؤنی) is a cantonment in the Multan District, adjacent to Multan city, in Punjab province, Pakistan. Multan Cantt is located in the city's southwest.

Multan Cantt is reachable via Sher Shah Road. The route to Multan industrial area is also via Sher Shah Road. All FGEI schools are also located on the Sher Shah Road, Multan.

The cantonment contains bazaars including Sadar Bazaar for shopping having many shops, commercial buildings and supermarkets and restaurants. It has a railway station and international airport. The cantonment has a park, Cantonment Garden, also called Cantt Garden or Company Garden. The Jheel (lake) at Fort Park is also located in Multan Cantt. There are also many villas and housing schemes in the city. It has schools, colleges and many educational institutions.

Multan Cantt is one of the most populous areas in Multan same as Gulgasht Colony, Qasim Bela, Gulshan Market and Hussain Agahi Bazaar. Sohan Halwa is the famous food of the cantonment.

== Bazaars ==
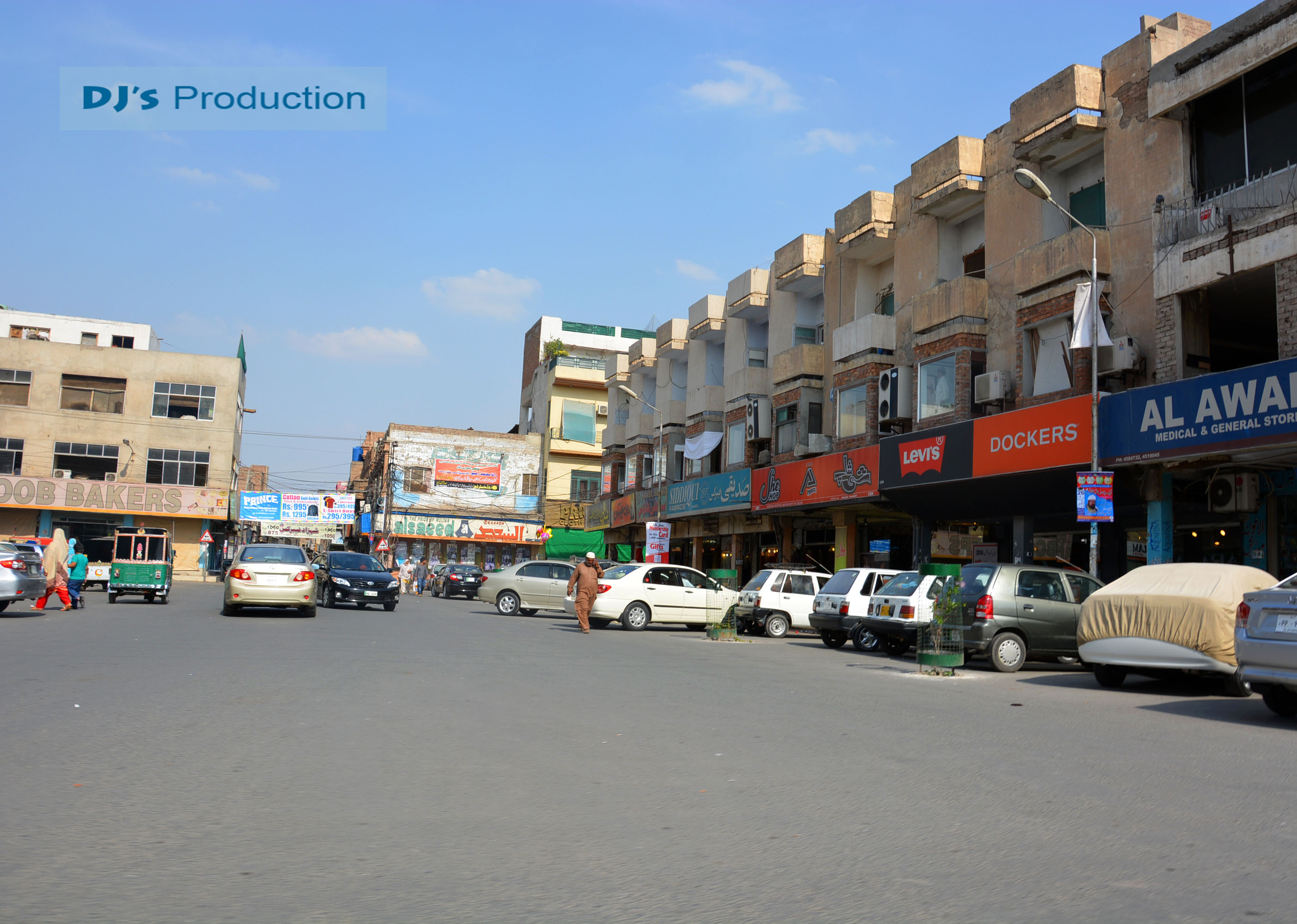
Sadar Bazaar road entrance

=== Sadar Bazaar ===
Sadar Bazaar is the second most eminent market of Multan Cantt after Hussin Agahi Bazaar. This bazaar holds premium products which are not obtainable elsewhere in Multan. Various products for everyday use are sold there, such as fabric, electronics and perfumes. Sadar Bazaar road is a one way road extended from Tipu Sultan Road to Mehfooz Chowk.

Linking Roads:

- Tipu Sultan Road
- Ghani Bukhari Road
- Opal Shaheed Road

=== Churi Bazaar ===
Churi Bazaar, also an eminent market of Multan Cantt, known for the street of bangles, and also refers as Sadar Bazaar. It also contains many shops selling bangles, clothes, jewelry, laces and earrings.

Linking Roads:

- Ban Bazaar Road
- Jamia Masjid Road
- Sadar Bazaar Road

=== Sarafa Bazar ===
Sarafa Bazaar started at the end of Sadar Bazaar. It is also a one-way road extended from Mehfooz Chowk to Bomanji Chowk. Sarafa Bazaar is also known as "Dahi Bhalla Bazaar" for its many Dahi Bhalla shops. There are also shops selling canvas, shoes, sports equipment and medical items.

Linking Roads:

- Opal Saheed Road
- Nusrat Road

== Amenities ==
=== Cantt Garden ===
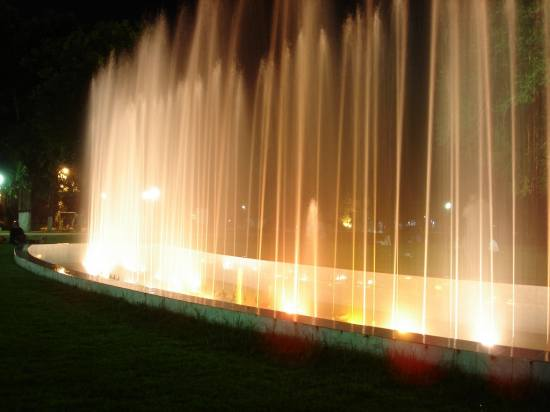
Night view of a fountain at Cantt Garden

Cantt Garden also known as Cantonment Garden or Company Garden is a garden in Multan. It is located on Club Road near Service Club, called MGM. It is contains jogging tracks, canteens, slides and swings for children. The garden has fountains, trees and a mini zoo.

A Flower show is held every year in the months of March and April for the welcoming of spring season. Live singing and dancing concerts also are held at night during flower show.

=== Fort Park ===
Fort Park, also known as Chaman Zar Askari Lake or Jheel, is located on Sher Shah road in Cantt. It contains lake for boat riding, rides for children and elders, canteens and a mini zoo.

=== Lalak Jaan Shaheed Park ===
Lalak Jaan Shaheed Park is located at Emperial Chowk near Cantonment Multan Hospital. It is a smaller park than Cantt Garden and Fort Park in Cantt. This park is a tribute to Havaldar Lalak Jan Shaheed, the recent recipient of Nishan-e-Haider military award.

=== GPL Multan ===
GPL Multan is a well-known library located in Multan Cantt, managed under the supervision of the Pakistan Army. The library is open to everyone with a valid CNIC card.

== Mosques ==
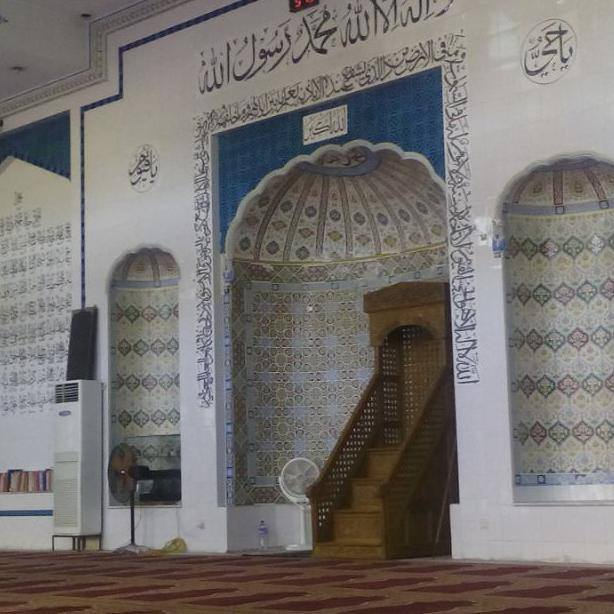
Inside view of Laal Masjid Multan Cantt

Cantt consists of a number of beautiful mosques. Cantt Eid Gah Mosque is a big mosque of Cantt. Following is the list of Mosques in Multan Cantt:

- Cantt Eid Gah Mosque Nusrat Road
- Laal Masjid/Jamia Masjid Cantt
- Jamia Masjid Abdul Shakoor
- Masjid Fatimat-ul-Zahra, Bohra Street
- Masjid Abu Muhammad, Mall Road
- Masjid Anujuman, Nusrat Road
- Ghousia Majid, Allama Iqbal Town
- Jamia Masjid Peer Waali
- Masjid Ibraheem
- Madina Masjid

== Churches ==
Cantt also has two churches.

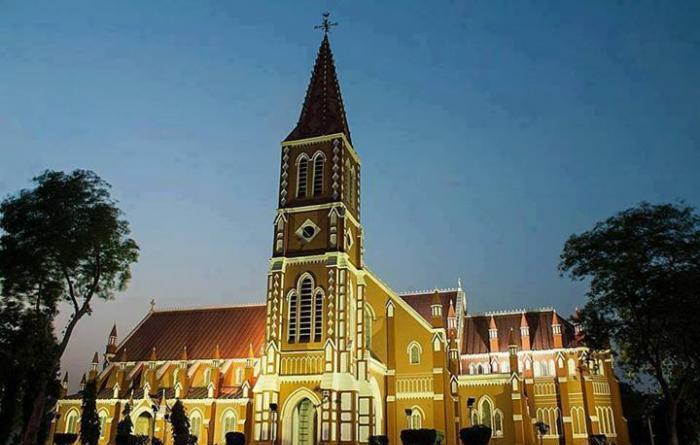
Night view of St. Mary's Cathedral & Bishop's House Multan

=== St. Mary's Cathedral & Bishop's House ===
St. Mary's Cathedral & Bishop's House is a Church of Pakistan cathedral church. It is the biggest church in Multan. It is located near Cantonment Multan Hospital opposite Federal Boys School branch 1.

=== Cathedral of the Holy Redeemer ===
Cathedral of the Holy Redeemer is a catholic church located at Aurangzeb Road opposite Federal Boys School branch 2 and also one of the beautiful churches.

== Commercial Buildings and Markets ==
- Bomanji Square
- Service Club Multan/Multan Garrison Mess
- Radio Pakistan, Multan
- Khan Center
- Khawar Center
- Mall Plaza
- Khan Plaza
- Fashion Mall
- City Center

== Hospitals ==
- Combined Military Hospital (CMH), Multan
- Christian Hospital, Multan

== Educational Institutions ==
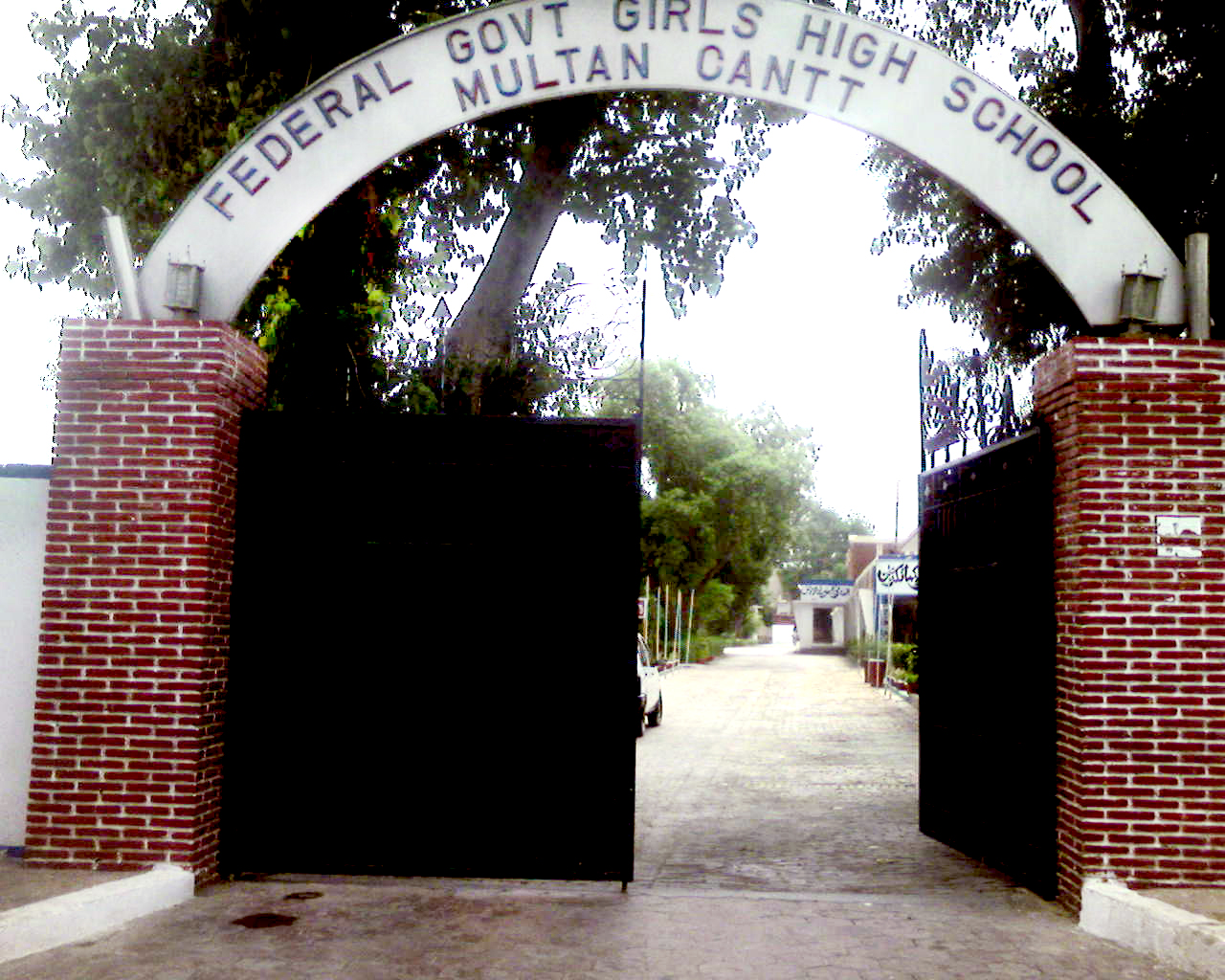
FG Girls High School Multan Cantt entrance gate

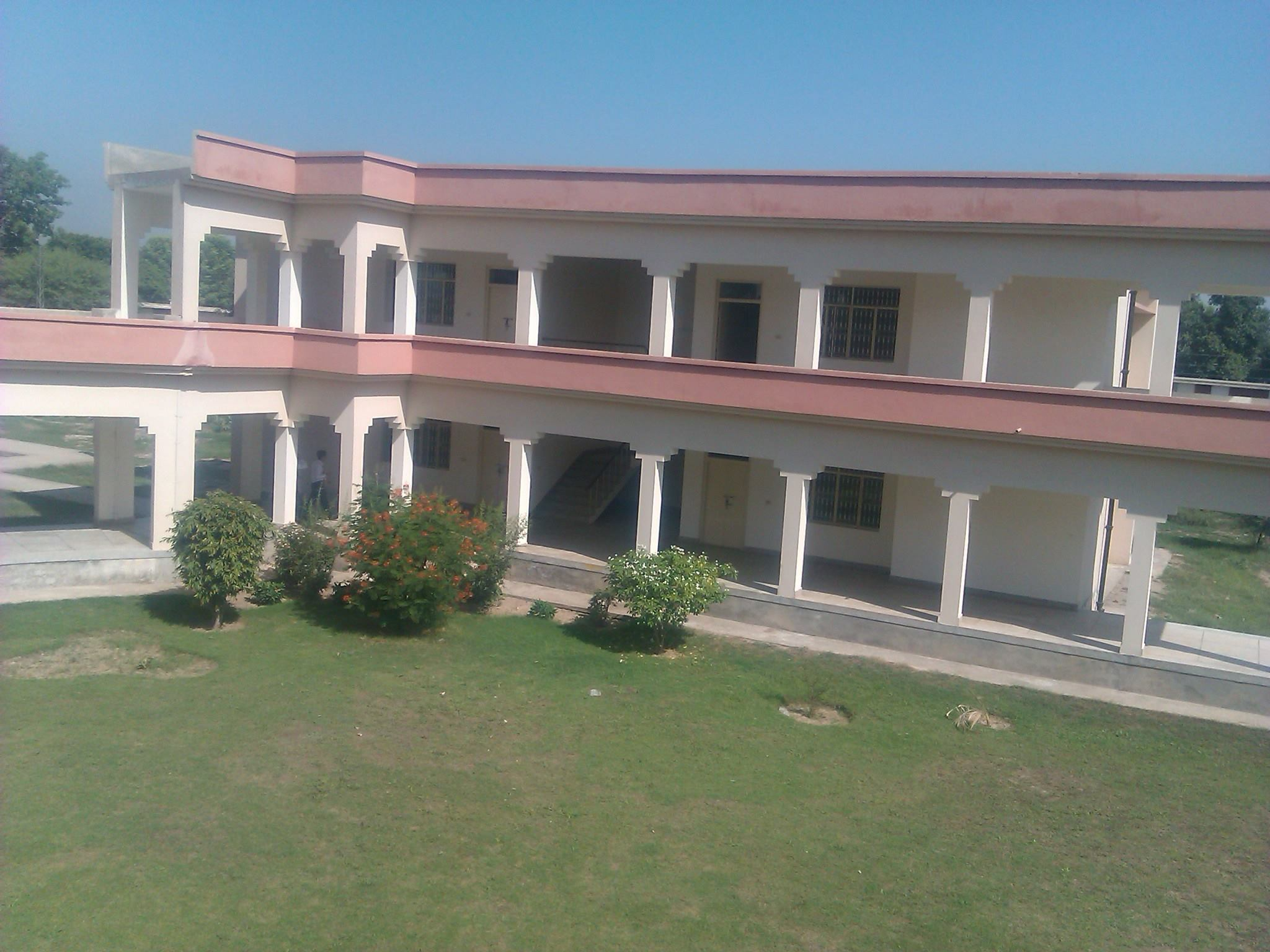
FG Degree College for Boys Sher Shah road Multan Cantt

=== Schools ===
- Army Public School
- FG Boys High School No.1
- FG Boys High School No.2
- FG Girls High School
- FG Public High School
- FG Public Junior High School
- Nusrat-ul-Islam Girls High School
- Nusrat-ul-Islam Boys High School
- Zaib Foundation High School

=== Colleges ===
- Army Public Degree College for Boys
- FG Degree College for Boys
- FG Degree Women College
- Nusrat-ul-Islam Girls College

=== Universities ===
- Air University (Multan Campus)

== Flyovers and Roads ==
=== Flyovers ===
- Yousuf Raza Gillani Flyover is longest flyover in Punjab province and 2nd largest flyover in Pakistan. Ground breaking of this flyover was done by former prime minister of Pakistan Yousuf Raza Gillani on the new year ceremony on Saturday, 31 December 2011. It was built at a cost of around Rs.1.6 billion rupees. It is the part of Inner Ring Road Multan project. It is a four lane flyover with partitions. Two one ways of two lanes each. Length of the flyover is 1.6 km (excluding length of extra three ramps). There are three extra ramps connecting to the main flyover.
- Railway Flyover is an old flyover in Multan located on Cantt Railway Station. It extended from Aziz Hotel to Double Phatak Chowk.

=== Roads ===
Name	Extension		Nearby Places
Name	From	To	Nearby Places
Abdali Road	S.P Chowk	Ghanta Ghar Chowk	Nawah Sheher, Fawara Chowk
Nusrat Road	Bomanji Chowk	S.P Chowk	Radio Pakistan, Christian Hospital
Sher Shah Road	Dera Adda	Sher Shah Interchange	Aziz Hotel, Cantonment Garden, Jheel, Garden Town, Muzaffarabad
Old Bahawalpur Road	S.P Chowk	Kalma Chowk	Tariq Road
Mall Road	Quied-e-Azam Road	Bomanji Chowk	Mall Plaza, Nusrat Road
Quied-e-Azam Road	Mall Road	Ghoora Chowk	Mall Plaza, Post office, Cantonment garden
Tipu Sultan Road	Sadar Bazaar	Ghoora Chowk	Army Headquarters, Talha Road
Qasim Bela Road	Emperial Chowk	Qasim Bela	SSS Line, Multan International Airport
Airport Road	Empiral Chowk	Chungi No.1	CMH Multan, Ayub Stadium, Multan International Airport, Lagaryal
Aurangzeb Road	Tipu Sultan Road	Grass Mandi	Quied-e-Azam Road, Sher Shah Road
Imperial Road	Imperial Chowk	S.P Chowk	Lalak Jaan Shaheed Park, Khan Plaza, Multan Church
Gujjar Khadda Road	Bomanj Chowk	Dera Adda	Afshar Colony, Tasty Hotel
Railway Road	Aziz Hotel	Haram Gate	Cantt Railway Station, Saddu Hasaam, Lakar Mandi, Chowk Shaheedan
Ghani Bukhari Road	Saddar Cantt Police Station	Mall Road	Cantt Police Station, Mall Plaza
Ban Bazaar Road	Saddar Cantt Police Station	Nusrat Road	Cantt Police Station, Kamran Hotel, Khurshid Hotel, Khurshid Naan Shop, Kanak Mandi
Saddar Bazaar Road	Tipu Sultan Road	Bomanji Chowk	Mehfooz Chowk, Bomanji Square, Kanak Mandi
Opal Shaheed Road	Mall Road	Lal Kurti	Mehfooz Chowk, Masjid Abu Muhammad, Kamran Hotel, Khurshid Hotel, Cantt Market
Jamia Masjid Road	Opal Shaheed Road	Saddar Cantt Police Station	Laal Masjid, Khurshid Hotel
Bohra Street	Metro Plaza	Mall Road	Metro Plaza, Cantt Drug Store, Post Office, Masjid Fatimat-ul-Zahra, Carvaan Book Centre, Clifton Studios
FG School Road	Metro Plaza	Lal Kurti Chowk	F.G Boys High School No.1, Jamia Masjid Peer Waali, Metro Plaza
Lal Kurti Road	Lal Kurti Chowk	Nusrat Road	Jamia Masjid Abdul Shakoor, Cantt Eid Gah Mosque, Allama Iqbal Town, Bali Tea Stall
Muhammad Ali Bohra Road	Opal Shaheed Road	Nusrat Road	Cantt Market, Madina Masjid, Nusrat-ul-Islam Boys High School

== Sports ==
- Ayub Stadium
- CMH Sports Grounds
- Railway Ground

== Railway Station ==
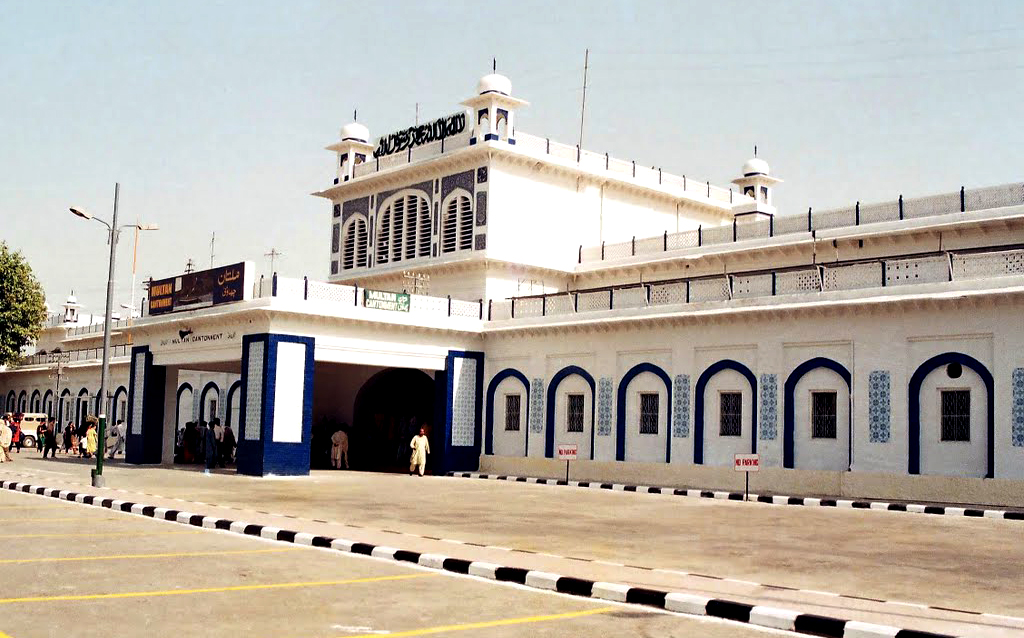
Front view of Cantt Railway Station

Multan Cantonment railway station or Multan Chaoni railway station is the principal railway station Multan, located on the railway road. It is a major railway station of Pakistan Railway located on Karachi-Peshawar main railway line. The station is staffed and has advance and current reservation offices. Food stalls are also located on it platforms.

=== Named Passenger Trains ===
Train Name	Route
Bahauddin Zakaria Express	Multan-Karachi via Hyderabad and Rohri
Mehr Express	Multan-Rawalpindi via Kot Adu and Mianwali
Musa Pak Express	Multan-Lahore via Khanewal, Sahiwal, Okara, and Raiwand
Thal Express	Multan-Rawalpindi via Kot Adu and Attock City
Multan Express	Multan-Lahore via Khanewal Sahiwal Lahore

== International Airport ==
Front view of Multan International Airport

Multan International Airport is situated at Qasim Bela road. It was originally built to cater mainly to the population of Multan, however as the airport gained much popularity traffic from surrounding areas which included Shujabad, Vehari, Lodhran, Khanewal, Mian Channu, Shorkot, Muzaffargarh, Kot Adu, Layyah, Rajanpur, Burewala, Chichawatni and Sahiwal.

=== Airlines and destinations ===
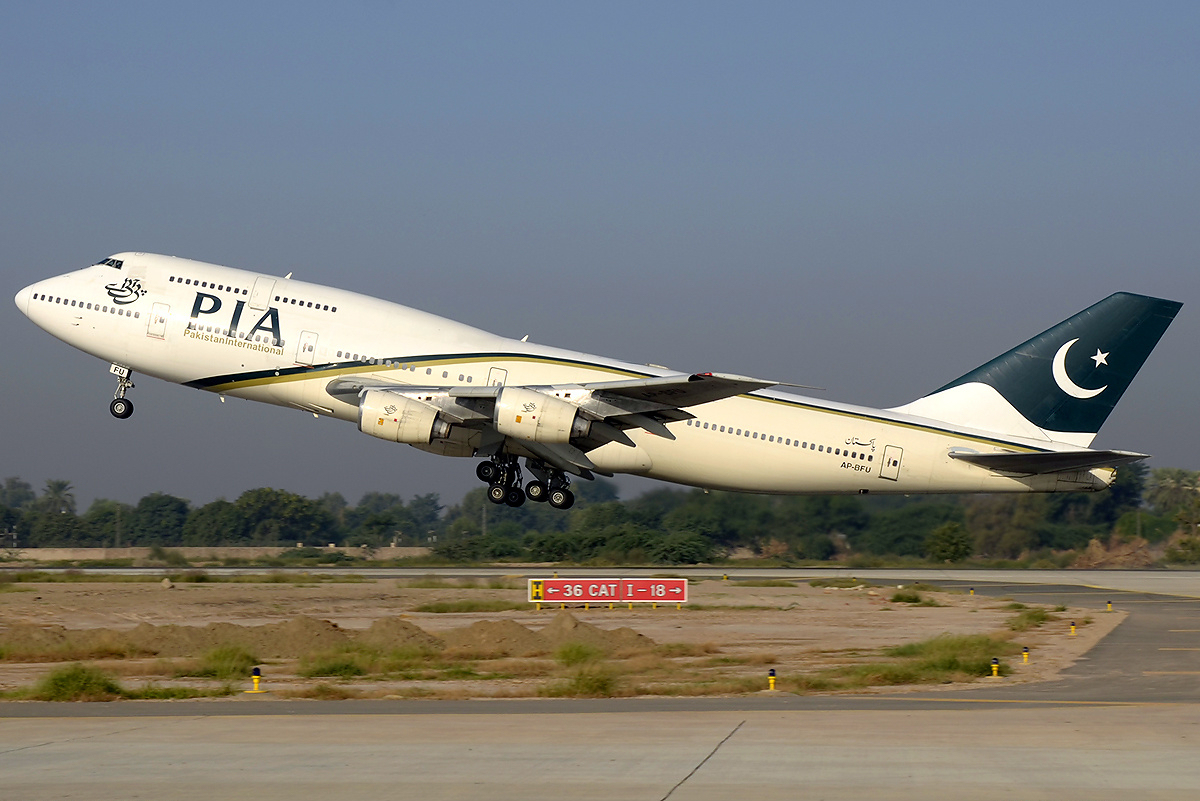
PIA Boeing 747-300 taking off from the newly renovated runway.

Airlines	Destinations
Air Arabia	Sharjah
Airblue	Jeddah, Karachi, Medina, Sharjah
Emirates	Dubai-International
Flydubai	Dubai-International
Gulf Air	Bahrain
Pakistan International Airlines	Abu Dhabi, Islamabad, Jeddah, Karachi, Lahore, Medina, Riyadh
Qatar Airways	Doha
Taban Air	Seasonal: Mashhad

== See also ==
- Cantonments of Pakistan
- Cantonment (Pakistan)
