= Super Express =

Super Express may refer to:

- Super Express (newspaper), a Polish tabloid newspaper
  - Super Express USA, a Polish-American newspaper
- Super Express (film), a 2016 Chinese film directed by Song Xiao

== Express trains ==
- Patna - Hatia Super Express, an Indian express train between Patna and Hatia, Ranchi
- Super Express (Pakistan), a defunct Pakistani express train between Karachi and Malakwal
- Hitachi Super Express, a proposed British train
  - British Rail Class 800
  - British Rail Class 801
- Shinkansen
