= MZJ =

MZJ or mzj may refer to:

- MZJ, the IATA and FAA LID code for Pinal Airpark, Arizona, United States
- MZJ, the station code for Muzaffarabad railway station, Punjab, Pakistan
- mzj, the ISO 639-3 code for Manya language, Liberia
