= Saint Mary's Cathedral, Multan =

Saint Mary's Cathedral
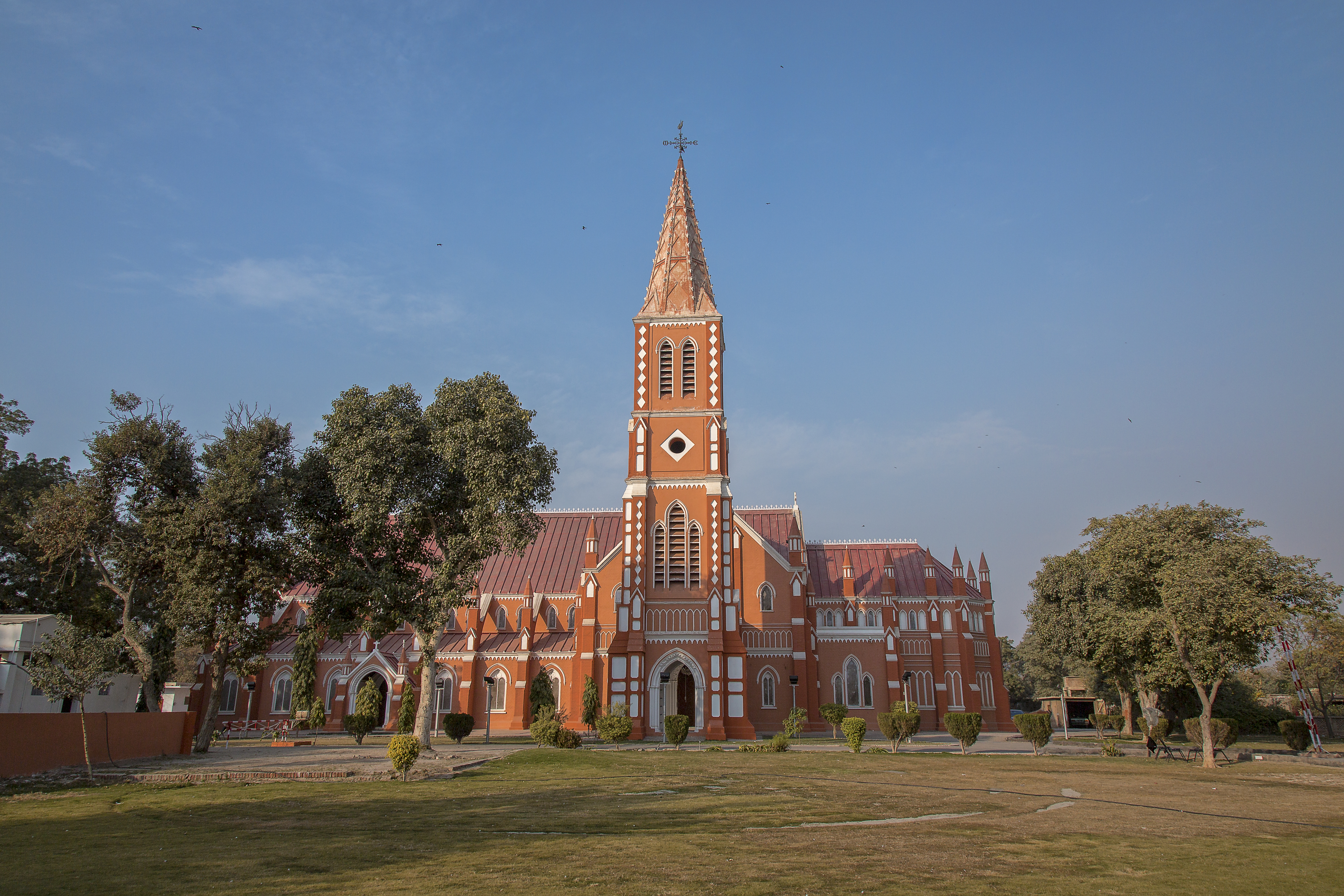
- Saint Mary's Cathedral in Multan
- Saint Mary's Cathedral
- 30°11′26″N 71°26′14″E
- Location: Multan, Punjab
- Country: Pakistan
- Denomination: Protestant

History
- Founded: 1848
- Dedication: St. Mary
- Consecrated: 1848

Saint Mary's Cathedral is a cathedral and historical monument in Multan, Pakistan.

== History ==
Saint Mary's Cathedral was constructed in 1848 when Punjab was part of British India.

Over the years, the building was deteriorated significantly. In a collaborative effort, the Pakistan Army and civil society of Multan undertook extensive renovation work to restore the cathedral. Following comprehensive restoration and repair, the cathedral reopened its doors to the public in December 2013. The restoration project, costing over five million rupees, was funded through contributions from the Cantonment Board Multan and civil society.
