= Karakoram Express =

Pakistani passenger train

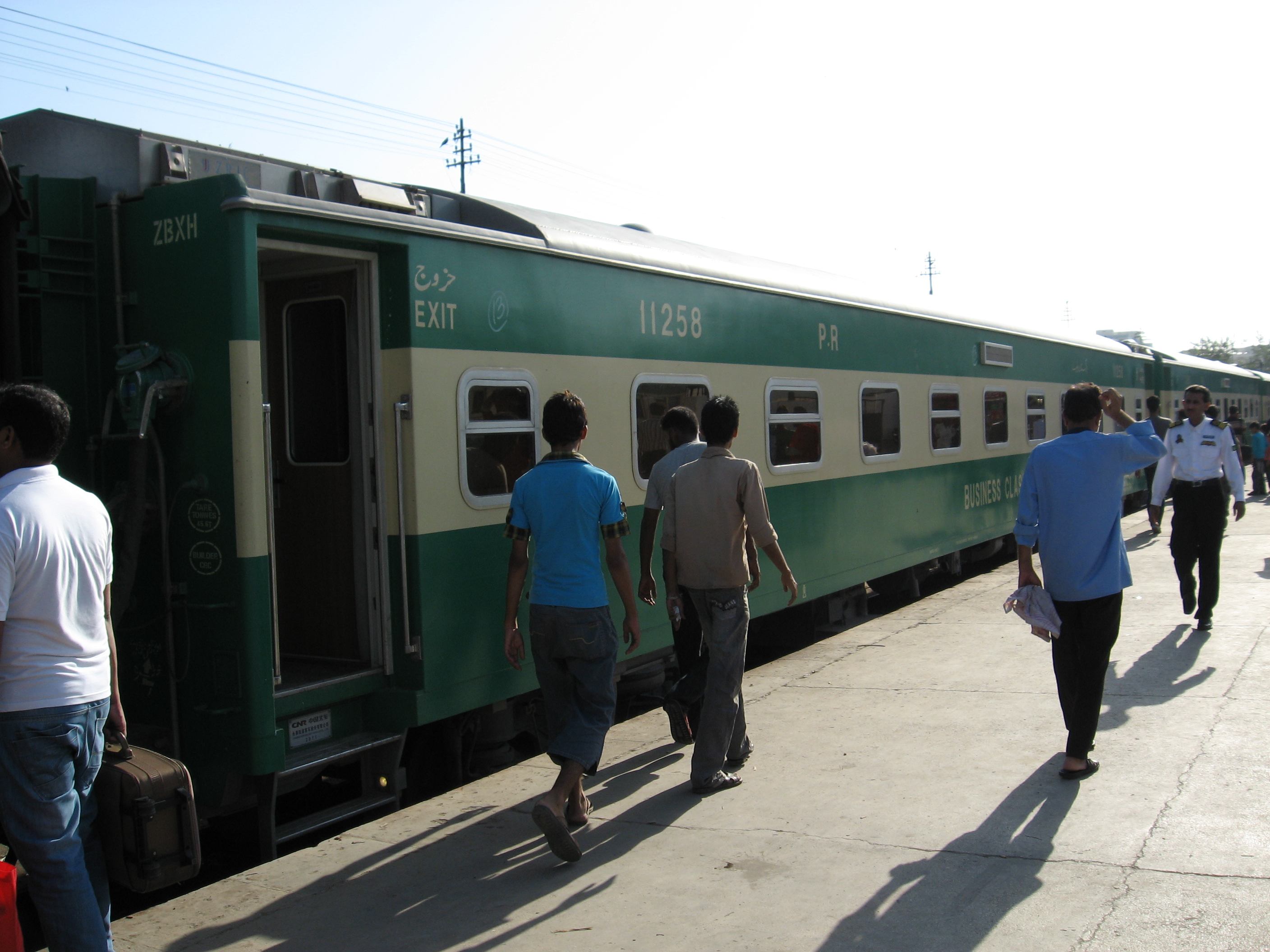

Overview
- Service type: Inter-city rail
- First service: 14 August 2002
- Current operator: Pakistan Railways

Route
- Termini: Karachi Cantonment; Lahore Junction
- Stops: 6
- Distance travelled: 1,241 kilometres (771 mi)
- Average journey time: 17 hours, 45 minutes
- Service frequency: Daily
- Train numbers: 41UP (Karachi→Lahore); 42DN (Lahore→Karachi)

On-board services
- Classes: AC Business; AC Standard; Economy Class
- Sleeping arrangements: Available
- Catering facilities: Available

Technical
- Track gauge: 1,676 mm (5 ft 6 in)
- Track owner: Pakistan Railways
Route map
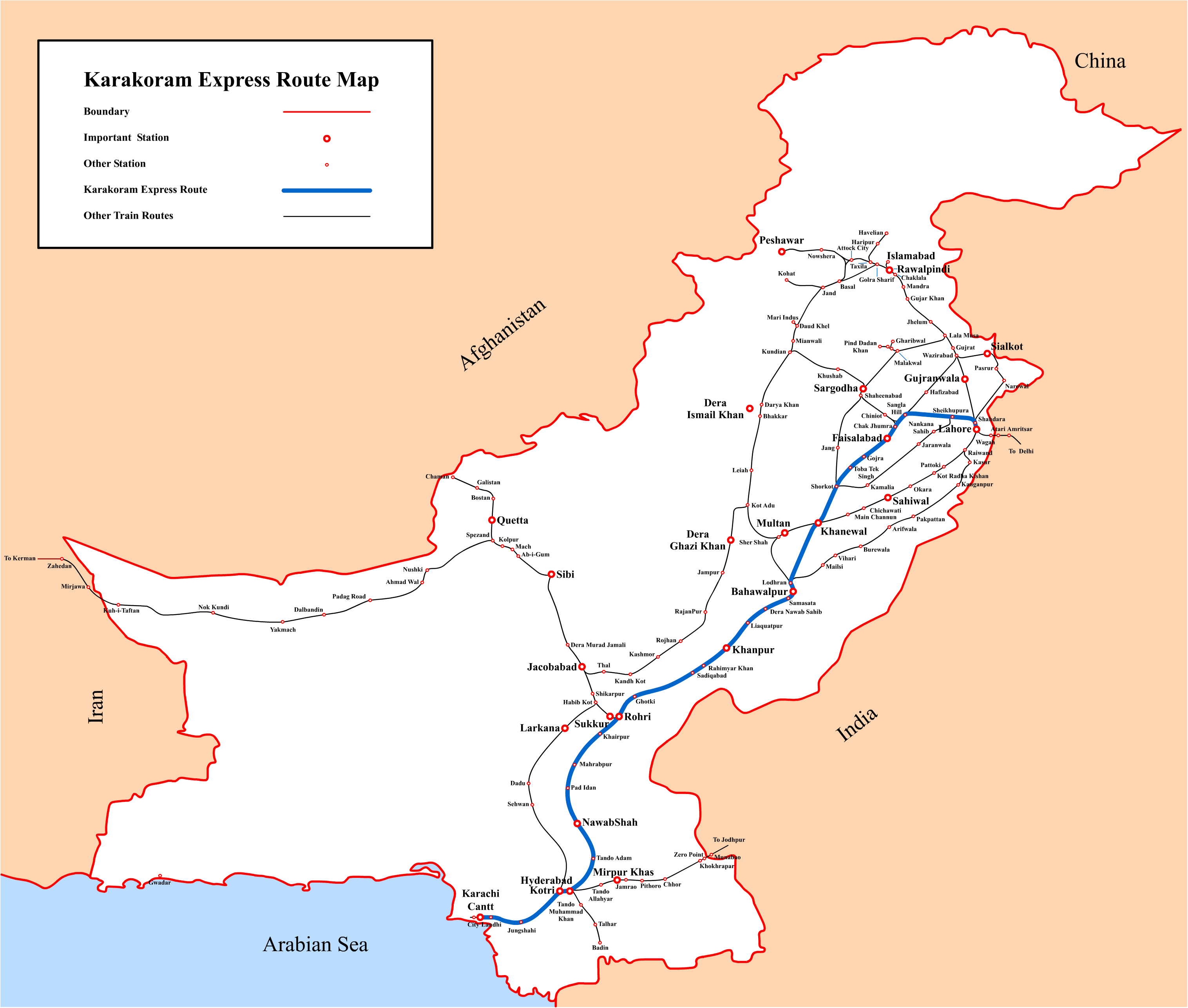
- Karakoram Express route map

Karakoram Express (Urdu: قراقرم ایکسپریس) is a passenger train operated daily by Pakistan Railways between Karachi and Lahore. The trip takes approximately 17 hours and 45 minutes to cover a published distance of 1,241 kilometres (771 mi), traveling along a stretch of the Karachi–Peshawar Railway Line, Khanewal–Wazirabad Branch Line and Shahdara Bagh–Sangla Hill Branch Line. The train is named after the famous Karakoram mountain range of northern Pakistan.

== History ==
Karakoram Express was inaugurated on 14 August 2002. This was during a period where Pakistan Railways went through several "facelifts" under Pervez Musharraf's government (including Karachi Express, Tezgam and Shalimar Express). Karakoram Express acquired the title of the "fastest train in Pakistan".

== Route ==
- Karachi Cantonment–Khanewal Junction via Karachi–Peshawar Railway Line
- Khanewal Junction–Sangla Hill Junction via Khanewal–Wazirabad Branch Line
- Sangla Hill Junction–Shahdara Bagh Junction via Shahdara Bagh–Sangla Hill Branch Line
- Shahdara Bagh Junction–Lahore Junction via Karachi–Peshawar Railway Line

== Station stops ==
- Karachi Cantonment
- Hyderabad Junction
- Rohri Junction
- Bahawalpur
- Khanewal Junction
- Toba Tek Singh
- Faisalabad
- Lahore Junction

== Equipment ==
The train operates 13 economy carriages, 4 AC Business carriages, 1 power van and 1 luggage van.
