= Sher Shah, Multan =

Sher Shah شیر شاہ
- Town
- Location in Pakistan
- Coordinates: 30°11′52″N 71°28′11″E
- Country: Pakistan
- Region: Punjab
- District: Multan District
- Time zone: UTC+5 (PST)

Sher Shah (Urdu: شيرشاه) is a town in Multan District in the Punjab province of Pakistan.

== Name ==
Sher Shah was a Sufi saint from the local area. His tomb is on Sher Shah Road. The main road of Multan Cantt and the town are named after him.

== Industry ==
Sher Shah is famous for its mangoes. An oil depot is also located there.
