= Muzaffarabad, Multan =

Pakistani town

مظفرآباد
- Town
- Muzaffarabad
- Interactive map of مظفرآباد
- Coordinates: 30°08′14.29″N 71°21′32.35″E
- Country: Pakistan
- Province: Punjab
- Time zone: UTC+5 (PST)

Muzaffarabad is town near Multan on Muzaffargarh Multan road. It is famous for Colony Textile Mill, one of the largest textile mills of Pakistan. According to official and newspapers reports, 14 workers were killed in 1978 in Colony Textile Mill. Mussawat, newspaper, reported a total of 22 deaths. But unofficial estimates put the total number as high as 150–200.

== History ==
This town was founded by Nawab Muzaffar Khan.

== See also ==
- Muzaffarabad railway station
