= Dadu station =

Dadu station may refer to:

- Dadu railway station (Pakistan), on the Kotri–Attock line in Sindh
- Dadu railway station (Taichung), on the TRA West Coast line in Taiwan
