= Muzaffarabad railway station =

Railway station in Punjab, Pakistan

Muzaffarabad Railway Station مظفر آباد ریلوے اسٹیشن

General information
- Coordinates: 30.1350°N 71.3647°E
- Owner: Ministry of Railways
- Line: Karachi–Peshawar Railway Line

Other information
- Station code: MZJ

Services
Preceding station	Pakistan Railways	Following station
Sher Shah Junction towards Kiamari	Karachi–Peshawar Line	Multan Cantonment towards Peshawar Cantonment
Location

Muzaffarabad Railway Station (Urdu and Punjabi: مظفر آباد ریلوے اسٹیشن) is an abandoned railway station located in Muzaffarabad, Punjab, Pakistan.

== See also ==
- List of railway stations in Pakistan
- Pakistan Railways
