= Shah Hussain Express =

Pakistani passenger train

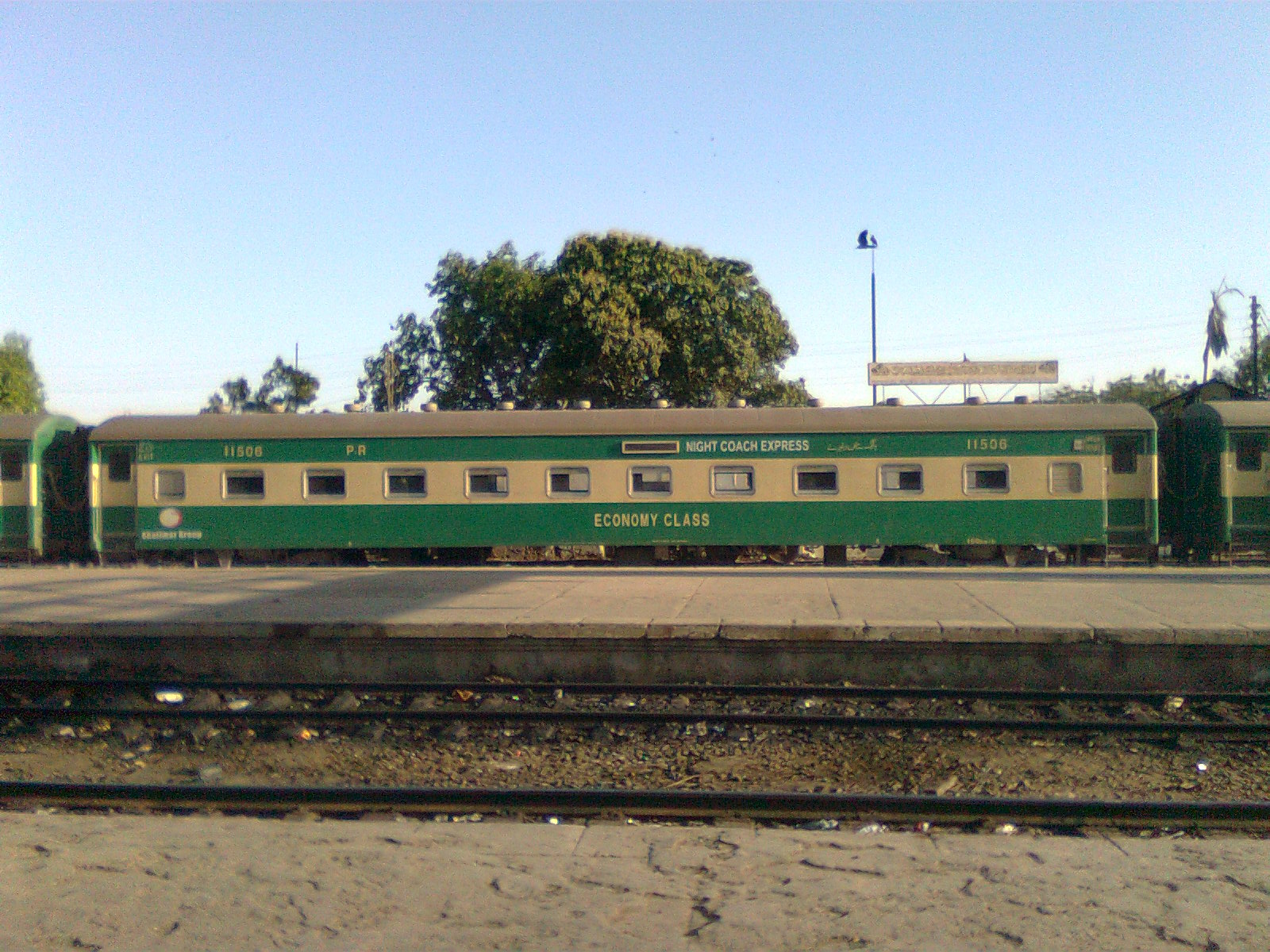
- Shah Hussain Express at Karachi Cantonment station

Overview
- Service type: Inter-city rail
- First service: 2013
- Last service: 2025
- Current operator: Pakistan Railways

Route
- Termini: Karachi Cantonment; Lahore Junction
- Stops: 5
- Distance travelled: 1,286 kilometres (799 mi)
- Average journey time: 18 hours
- Service frequency: Daily
- Train numbers: 43UP (Karachi→Lahore); 44DN (Lahore→Karachi)

On-board services
- Classes: AC Sleeper; AC Lower; Economy; Dining Car
- Sleeping arrangements: Available
- Catering facilities: Available (complimentary breakfast)

Technical
- Track gauge: 1,676 mm (5 ft 6 in)
- Track owner: Pakistan Railways
Route map
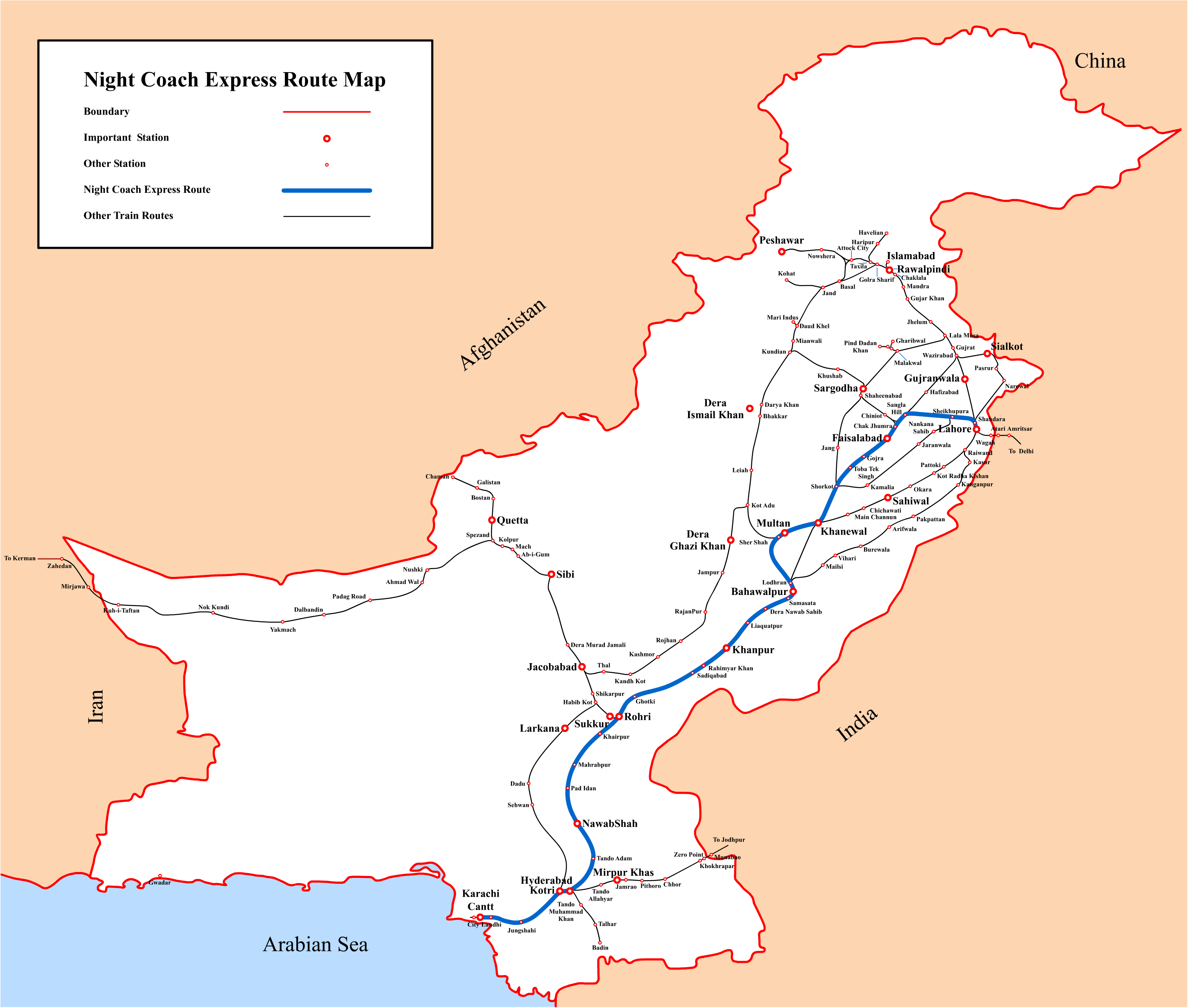
- Night Coach Express route map

Shah Hussain Express (Urdu: شاہ حسین ایکسپریس), previously known as Night Coach Express, was a passenger train operated daily by Pakistan Railways between Karachi and Lahore, The trip takes approximately 18 hours to cover a published distance of 1,286 kilometres (799 mi), traveling along a stretch of the Karachi–Peshawar Railway Line, Khanewal–Wazirabad Branch Line and Shahdara Bagh–Sangla Hill Branch Line.

By 13 January 2018, Pakistan Railways has taken unconditional control of Shah Hussain Express 43UP/44DN.

By 15 October 2018, Pakistan Railways changed its name to Shah Hussain Express from Night Coach Express. Shah Hussain Express was suspended in 2022 floods. On 25 February 2025, it was restored with refurbished coaches, new livery and catering services. Railways suspended the train service in late 2025, due to less occupany and operational losses.

== Route ==
- Karachi Cantonment–Khanewal Junction via Karachi–Peshawar Railway Line
- Khanewal Junction–Sangla Hill Junction via Khanewal–Wazirabad Branch Line
- Sangla Hill Junction–Shahdara Bagh Junction via Shahdara Bagh–Sangla Hill Branch Line
- Shahdara Bagh Junction–Lahore Junction via Karachi–Peshawar Railway Line

== Station stops ==
- Karachi Cantonment
- Hyderabad Junction
- Rohri Junction
- Bahawalpur
- Khanewal Junction
- Faisalabad
- Lahore Junction

== Equipment ==
The Shah Hussain Express consists of 2 AC Lower carriages, 1 AC Sleeper carriage, 7 Economy carriages as well as a dining carriage, power van and luggage van.
