= Abdali Road =

Road in the city of Multan, Pakistan

Abdali Road is located in Multan, a central city of Punjab province Pakistan. The road extends from Ghanta Ghar to SP Chowk. It is regarded as the model road of the city and it is also a commercial hub of the city.

== History ==
Ahmad Shah Abdali, leader of Afghanistan was born in Multan city. A monument and a mosque of his name stand on Abdali Road.

== See also ==
- Chowk Kumharanwala Level II Flyover, Multan
- List of roads in Multan
