= Multan Express =

Pakistani passenger train

Overview
- Service type: Inter-city rail
- First service: 1994
- Current operator: Pakistan Railways

Route
- Termini: Multan Cantonment; Lahore Junction
- Stops: 6
- Distance travelled: 312 kilometres (194 mi)
- Average journey time: 5 hours, 10 minutes
- Service frequency: Daily
- Train numbers: 117UP (Multan→Lahore); 118DN (Lahore→Multan)

On-board services
- Class: Economy
- Sleeping arrangements: Not Available
- Catering facilities: Not Available

Technical
- Track gauge: 1,676 mm (5 ft 6 in)
- Track owner: Pakistan Railways

Multan Express (Urdu: مُلتان ایکسپریس) is a passenger train operated daily by Pakistan Railways between Multan and Lahore. The trip takes approximately 5 hours and 10 minutes to cover a published distance of 312 kilometres (194 mi), traveling along a stretch of the Karachi–Peshawar Railway Line.

== History ==
The Multan Express was inaugurated on 15 December 2004.

== Route ==
- Multan Cantonment–Lahore Junction via Karachi–Peshawar Railway Line

== Station stops ==
- Multan Cantonment
- Khanewal Junction
- Mian Channun
- Sahiwal
- Okara
- Raiwind Junction
- Kot Lakhpat
- Lahore Junction

== Equipment ==
The train offers economy accommodation as well as Parlor car and Business Class.

== Accidents ==
In 2006, the Multan Express hit a car, killing three people. In 2009, two bogies of the Multan Express derailed near Gojra, with no human casualty announced.
