= Musa Pak Express =

Pakistani passenger train

Overview
- Service type: Express rail
- First service: 1986
- Current operator: Pakistan Railways

Route
- Termini: Multan Cantonment; Lahore Junction
- Stops: 08
- Distance travelled: 312 kilometres (194 mi)
- Average journey time: 5 hours, 10 minutes
- Service frequency: Daily
- Train numbers: 115UP (Multan→Lahore); 116DN (Lahore→Multan)

On-board services
- Classes: Economy Class; AC Standard; AC Business; Parlour Car
- Sleeping arrangements: Available

Technical
- Track gauge: 1,676 mm (5 ft 6 in)
- Track owner: Pakistan Railways

Musa Pak Express (Urdu: موسى پاک ایکسپریس) is a passenger train operated daily by Pakistan Railways between Multan and Lahore. The trip takes approximately 5 hours and 10 minutes to cover a published distance of 312 kilometres (194 mi), traveling along a stretch of the Karachi–Peshawar Railway Line. The train named after Syed Abul Hassab Musa Pak, a famous Sufi saint who lived in Multan between 1535–1592. It is one of the best trains to travel between Lahore and Multan due to its low fares and good quality.

== Route ==
- Multan Cantonment–Lahore Junction via Karachi–Peshawar Railway Line

== Station stops ==
- Multan Cantonment
- Khanewal Junction
- Mian Channun
- Chichawatni
- Sahiwal
- Okara
- Pattoki
- Raiwind Junction
- Kot Lakhpat
- Lahore Junction

== Equipment ==
The train offers AC Parlour, AC Business, AC Standard and economy class accommodations.
