= Pak Business Express =

Pakistani passenger train

Overview
- Service type: Inter-city rail
- Status: Operating
- First service: 2012
- Current operator: Pakistan Railways
- Former operator: Four Brothers Private Limited
- Website: https://www.pakrail.gov.pk/

Route
- Termini: Karachi Cantonment; Lahore Junction
- Distance travelled: 1,214 kilometres (754 mi)
- Average journey time: 19 hours, 30 minutes
- Service frequency: Daily each way
- Train numbers: 303UP (Karachi→Lahore); 304DN (Lahore→Karachi)
- Line used: Karachi–Peshawar Line

On-board services
- Classes: Economy Class; AC Standard; AC Business
- Sleeping arrangements: Available
- Catering facilities: Available

Technical
- Track gauge: 1,676 mm (5 ft 6 in)
- Track owner: Pakistan Railways
Route map
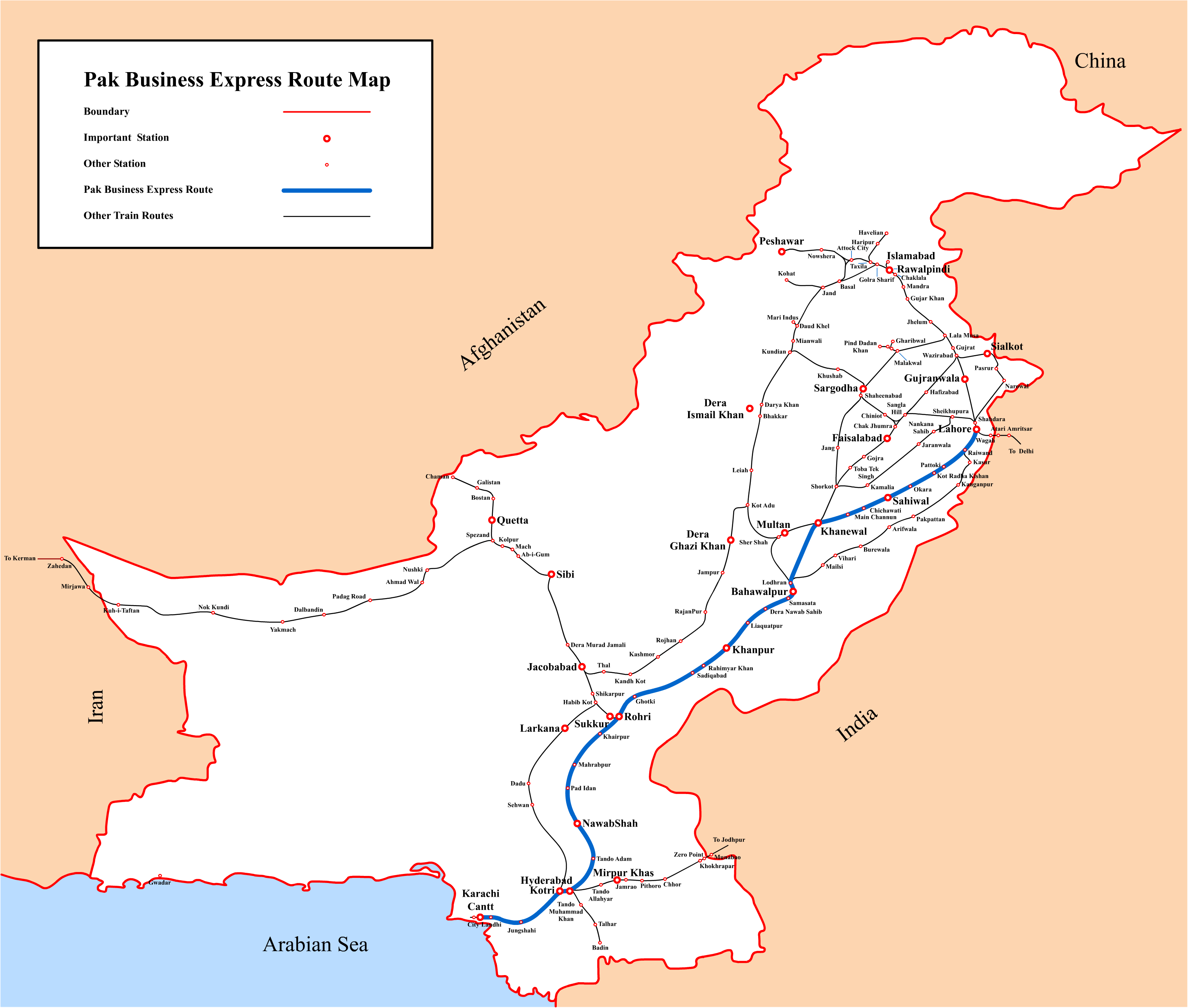
- Pak Business Express route map

The Pak Business Express (Urdu: پاک کاروبار اکسپريس), often abbreviated as Business Express, is a daily express train service between in Pakistan between the cities of Karachi and Lahore, which is one of the busiest routes in the country. It was inaugurated by the then Prime Minister Yusuf Raza Gilani on 4 January 2012.

The total traveling time of the route was 19 hours 30 minutes, on a total traveling distance of 1,214 kilometres (754 mi).

== History ==
The Pak Business Express was the brainchild of the Lahore Chamber of Commerce & Industry. Initially, Pakistan Railways started it with the collaboration of a private company Four Brothers Private Limited. It was the first public–private partnership model in railways services in Pakistan.

The service was launched when Pakistan Railways was facing financial issues owing to a host of challenges. These included the deterioration of infrastructure, the inability to purchase fuel from Pakistan State Oil due to exhausting its credit limit, liquidity constraints that led to delays in payment of its employees' salaries and pensions, and the destruction of railway facilities by angry mobs in 2007.

According to the contract between the two parties, the Four Brothers Group had to pay Rs. 3.1 million to Pakistan Railways for each trip between Lahore and Karachi. The private company provided modern facilities like LCD TVs, Wi-Fi, Internet, water dispensers, and lavish food on trains for the first time in Pakistan.

Having originally been a luxury rail service, the Pak Business Express experienced low ridership numbers during its initial weeks. Of the 486 seats available, only about 150 used to be occupied, which barely covered the operational costs. This was attributed to the availability of cheaper and more frequent alternate modes of transport between the two cities. This lack of demand forced Four Brothers to introduce an economy class within a few weeks of its launch with a lower fare.

However, due to a financial dispute on 29 October 2015, Pakistan Railways ended its joint venture with Four Brothers Private Limited and took control of Business Express. Now, this train is running under the management of Pakistan Railways.

== Route ==
- Karachi Cantonment – Lahore Junction via Karachi–Peshawar Line

== Station stops ==
- Karachi Cantonment
- Hyderabad Junction
- Nawabshah Junction
- Rohri Junction
- Rahim Yar Khan
- Bahawalpur
- Khanewal Junction
- Sahiwal
- Raiwind Junction
- Kot Lakhpat
- Lahore Junction

== Equipment ==
The train has AC Business, AC Standard, and Economy class coaches.
