= Pakistan Express =

Pakistani passenger train

Overview
- Service type: Inter-city rail
- First service: 2006
- Former operator: Pakistan Railways

Route
- Termini: Karachi Cantonment; Rawalpindi
- Stops: 27
- Distance travelled: 1,315 kilometres (817 mi)
- Average journey time: 25 hours, 50 minutes
- Train numbers: 45UP (Karachi→Rawalpindi); 46DN (Rawalpindi→Karachi)

On-board services
- Class: Economy
- Sleeping arrangements: Available
- Catering facilities: Available

Technical
- Track gauge: 1,676 mm (5 ft 6 in)
- Track owner: Pakistan Railways
Route map
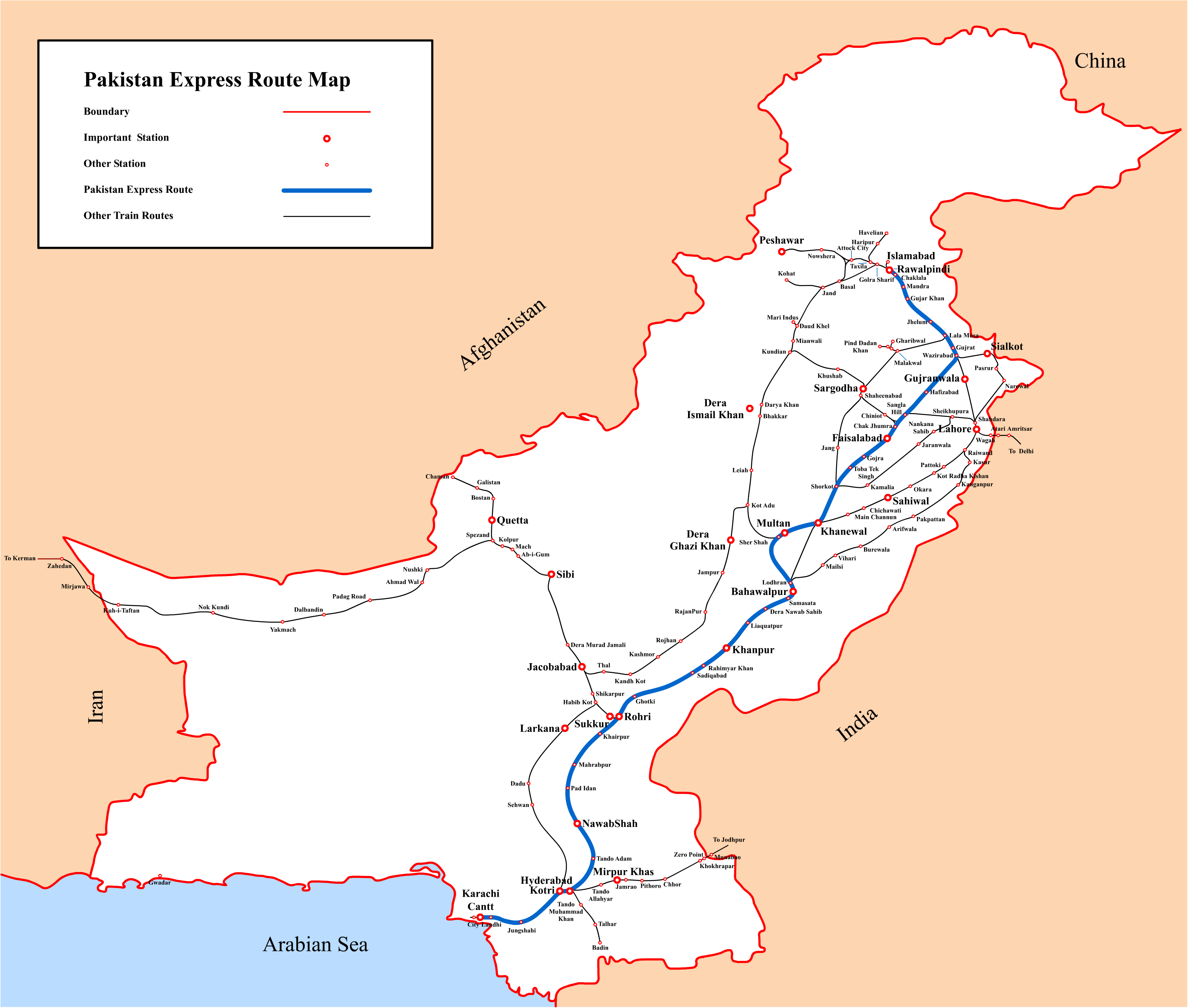
- Pakistan Express route map

Pakistan Express (Urdu: پاکستان ایکسپریس) is a passenger train operated daily by Pakistan Railways between Karachi and Rawalpindi. The trip takes approximately 25 hours and 50 minutes to cover a published distance of 1,315 kilometres (817 mi), traveling along a stretch of the Karachi–Peshawar Railway Line and Khanewal–Wazirabad Branch Line.

== History ==
The train was inaugurated on 16 December 2006 by the Prime Minister Shaukat Aziz at Rawalpindi railway station.

== Route ==
- Karachi Cantonment–Khanewal Junction via Karachi–Peshawar Railway Line
- Khanewal Junction–Wazirabad Junction via Khanewal–Wazirabad Branch Line
- Wazirabad Junction–Rawalpindi via Karachi–Peshawar Railway Line

== Station stops ==
- Karachi Cantonment
- Landhi Junction
- Hyderabad Junction
- Tando Adam Junction
- Rohri Junction
- Sadiqabad
- Rahim Yar Khan
- Khanpur Junction
- Bahawalpur
- Multan Cantonment
- Khanewal Junction
- Abdul Hakim
- Shorkot Cantonment Junction
- Toba Tek Singh
- Gojra
- Faisalabad
- Chak Jhumra Junction
- Sangla Hill Junction
- Sukheke
- Hafizabad
- Alipur Chatta
- Wazirabad Junction
- Gujrat
- Lala Musa Junction
- Jhelum
- Dina
- Gujar Khan
- Chaklala
- Rawalpindi

== Equipment ==
The train offers economy class, Business class and Ac Standard.
