= Multan Cantonment railway station =

Railway station in Pakistan

Multan Cantonment Station ملتان کینٹ ریلوے اسٹیشن
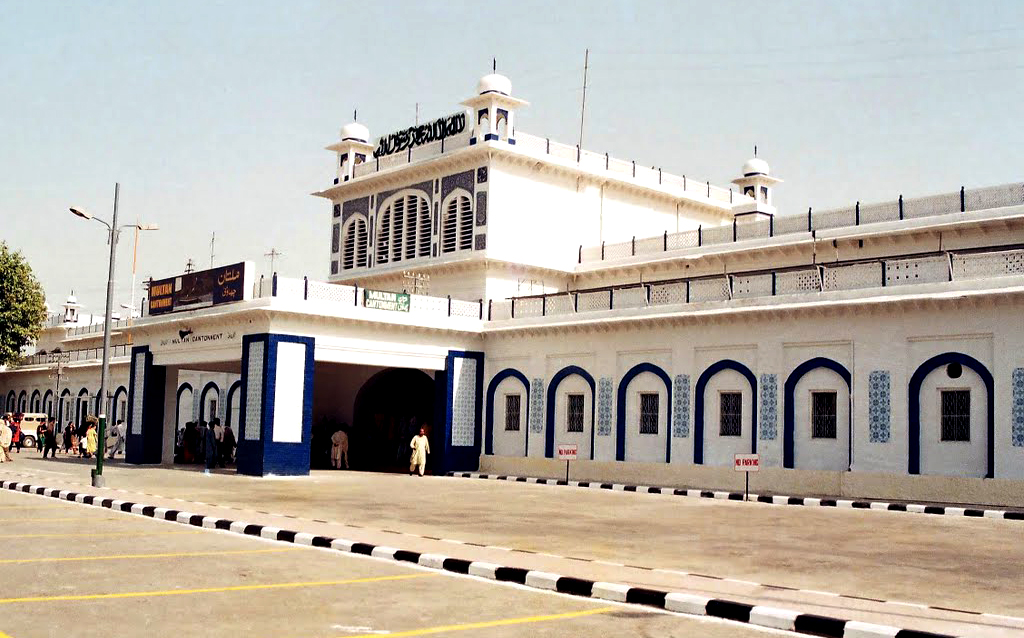
- Entrance of Multan Cantonment Station

General information
- Location: Multan Station Road; Multan, Punjab 60000; Pakistan
- Coordinates: 30.1804°N 71.4446°E
- Owner: Ministry of Railways
- Line: Karachi–Peshawar Line

Construction
- Parking: Available
- Accessible: Available

Other information
- Station code: MUL

History
- Opened: 1898

Services
Preceding station	Pakistan Railways	Following station
Muzaffarabad towards Kiamari	Karachi–Peshawar Line	Multan City towards Peshawar Cantonment
Location

Multan Cantonment Railway Station (often abbreviated as Multan Cantt) is the principal railway station in the city of Multan, Punjab province of Pakistan. It is a major railway station of Pakistan Railways located on Karachi–Peshawar Line.

== Facilities ==
The station is staffed and has advance and current reservation offices. Food stalls are also located on it platforms.

== Services ==
The following trains originate/stop at Multan Cantonment station:

Preceding station	Pakistan Railways	Following station
Shujabad towards Karachi Cantonment	Awam Express	Khanewal Junction towards Peshawar Cantonment
Shujabad towards Karachi City	Hazara Express	Riazabad towards Havelian
Karachi City towards Quetta	Jaffar Express	Drigh Road towards Peshawar Cantonment
Bahawalpur towards Karachi Cantonment	Karachi Express	Sahiwal towards Lahore Junction
Shujabad towards Karachi Cantonment	Khyber Mail	Khanewal Junction towards Peshawar Cantonment
Bahawalpur towards Karachi Cantonment	Night Coach Express	Faisalabad towards Lahore Junction
Bahawalpur towards Karachi Cantonment	Pakistan Express	Khanewal Junction towards Rawalpindi
Bahawalpur towards Karachi Cantonment	Shalimar Express	Faisalabad towards Lahore Junction
Bahawalpur towards Karachi Cantonment	Tezgam	Khanewal Junction towards Rawalpindi

== See also ==
- List of railway stations in Pakistan
- Pakistan Railways
