= Super Express (Pakistan) =

Pakistani passenger train

Super Express (Urdu: سپر ایکسپریس) was a daily express train service in Pakistan. It was started in the 1970s between Karachi and Lahore as the fastest train. Later it route was changed to Karachi and Sargodha via Faisalabad, and extended to Malakwal.

The train had Economy and First Class Sleeper accommodation. It was suspended in August 2012 due to a lack of locomotives.

Today in 2023, the fastest train from Lahore to Karachi is Green Line Express.

== Route ==
Karachi to Malakwal via Hyderabad, Rohri, Multan, Faisalabad and Sargodha
