= Karachi City railway station =

Railway station in Pakistan

Karachi City Railway Station کراچی شہر ریلوے اسٹیشن
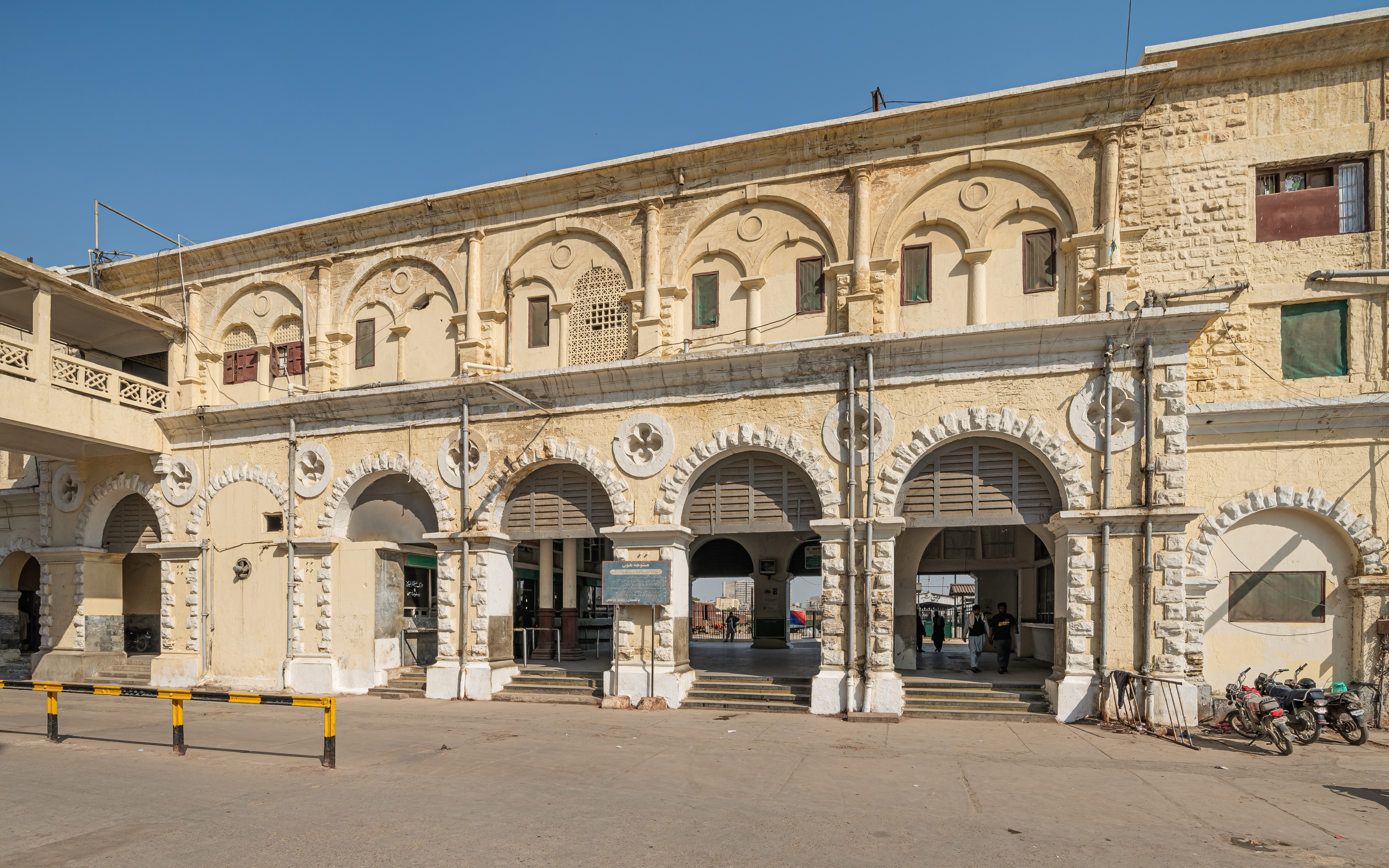

General information
- Location: 1622 I. I. Chundrigar Road; Karachi, Sindh 74000; Pakistan
- Coordinates: 24°50′54″N 67°00′23″E
- Owner: Pakistan Railways
- Lines: Karachi–Peshawar Railway Line; Karachi Circular Railway
- Platforms: 4
- Tracks: 4
- Connections: UTS-12

Construction
- Structure type: Standard
- Platform levels: 1
- Accessible: Available

Other information
- Station code: KYC

History
- Opened: 3 May 1864
- Former names: McLeod Station

Services
| Preceding station | Pakistan Railways | Following station |
|---|---|---|
| Kiamari Terminus | Karachi–Peshawar Line | Karachi Cantonment towards Peshawar Cantonment |
| Preceding station | Karachi Circular Railway | Following station |
| Terminus | Main line | Karachi Cantonment towards Dabheji |
| Karachi Port Trust Halt towards Drigh Road Junction | Loop line | Terminus |
Location

Karachi City Railway Station (Urdu: کراچی شہر ریلوے اسٹیشن), formerly McLeod Station, is one of the two main Karachi railway terminals along with the Karachi Cantonment station. Karachi City Station is located on I. I. Chundrigar Road, adjacent to Habib Bank Plaza, in Karachi, Pakistan. This station is the headquarters of the Pakistan Railways - Karachi Division.

== History ==
Karachi City Station was first established along the southern edge of McLeod Road (now I. I. Chundrigar Road) as the southern terminus point of the Scinde Railway, which was established in March 1855. A railway line was to be constructed between Karachi and Kotri, and work on the Karachi terminus commenced in April 1858. On 13 May 1861, the line was opened to the public, and was the first railway line for public traffic between Karachi and Kotri, a distance of 174 kilometres.

The station was completed in May 1864, and was upgraded in the 1880s with construction of a building farther to the west. By 1905, the station was referred to by British authorities as "Karachi City station," in plans to provide a roof at the passenger platform. Station yards were re-arranged and expanded around 1908. The station was upgraded again in 1935, when the current building made of local yellow Gizri sandstone was built.

== Facilities ==
Karachi City Station is equipped with all basic facilities. The station has current and advance reservation offices for Pakistan Railways as well as cargo and parcel facilities. Retail shops are found on platform 1. Due to the lack of space, most passenger trains have since been moved to Karachi Cantonment Station.

== Gallery ==
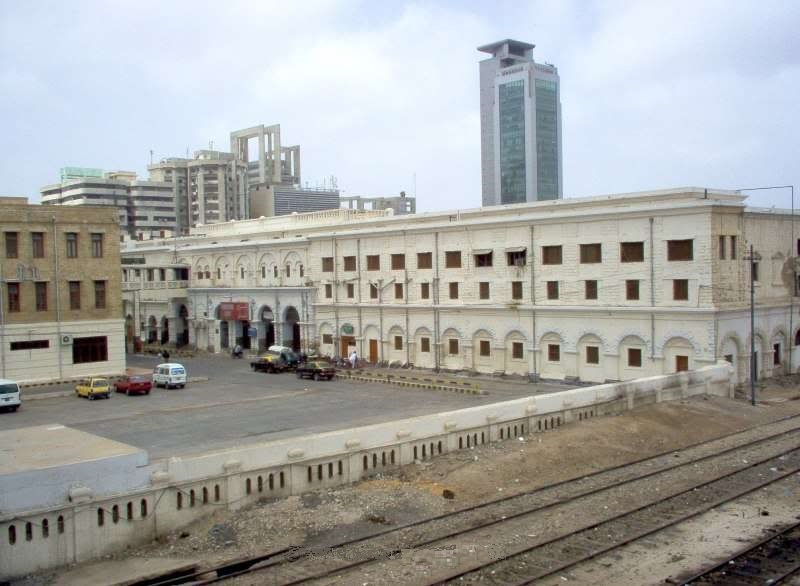
Front of the station with the MCB Tower in the background

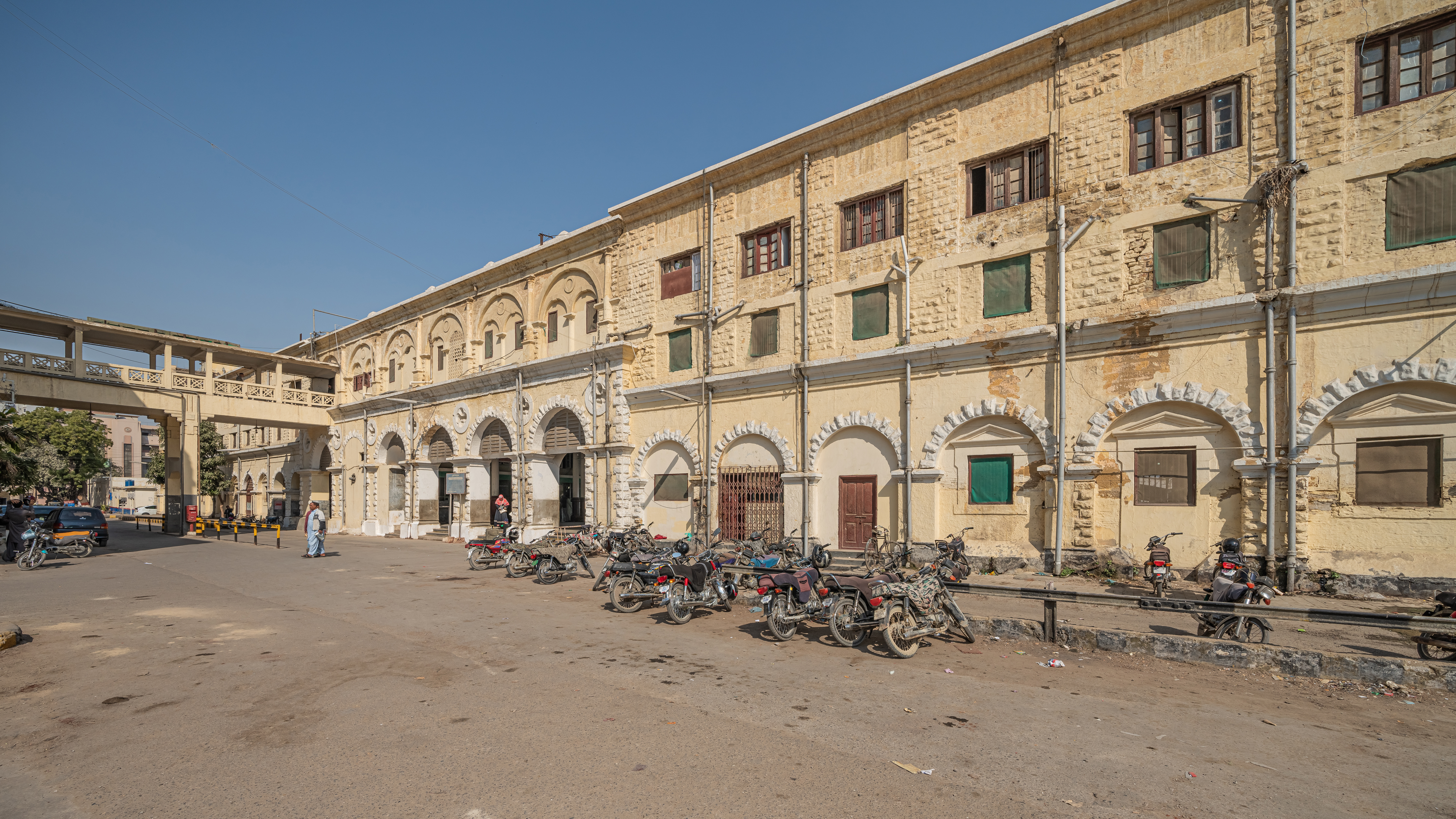

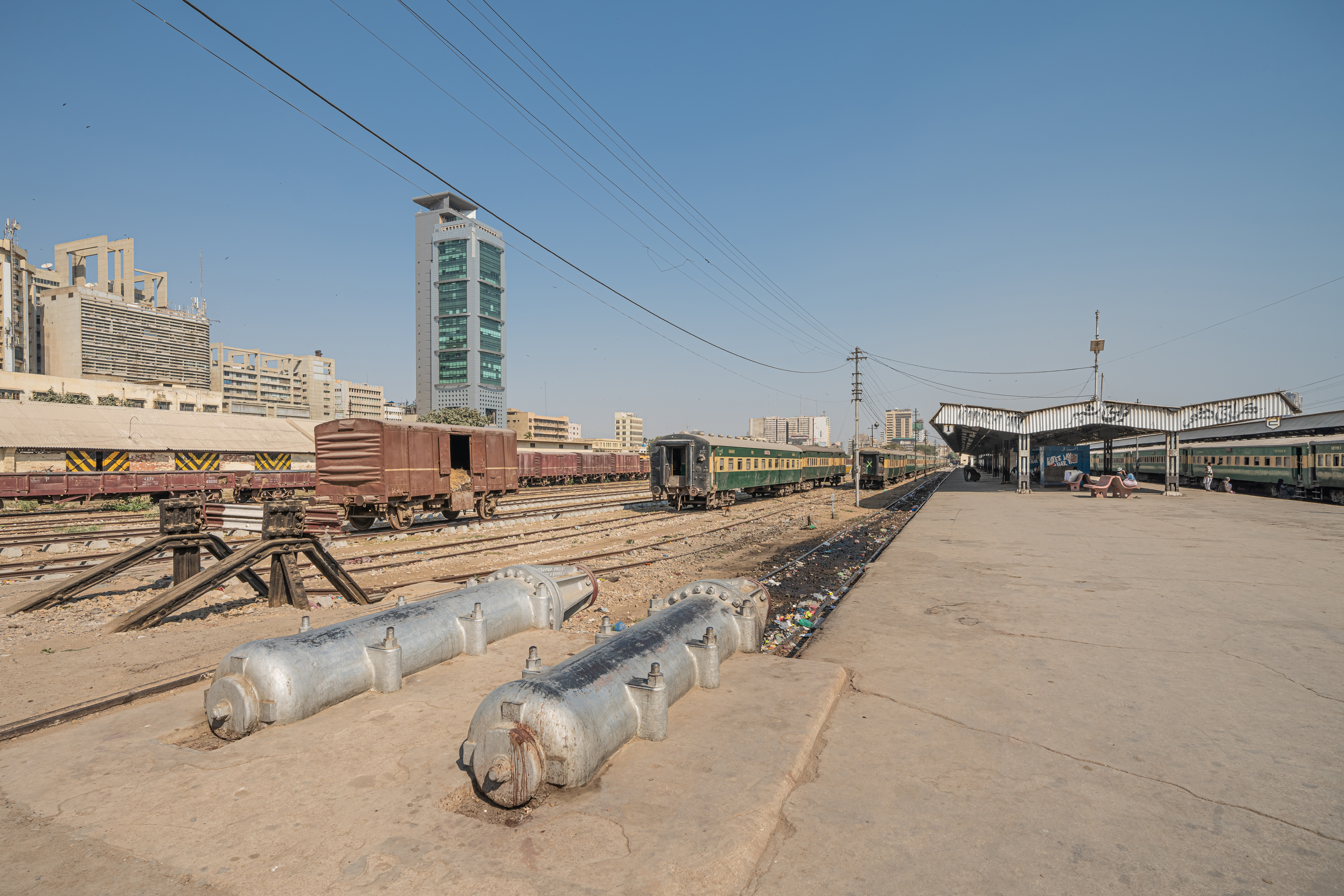
Station yards with the MCB Tower

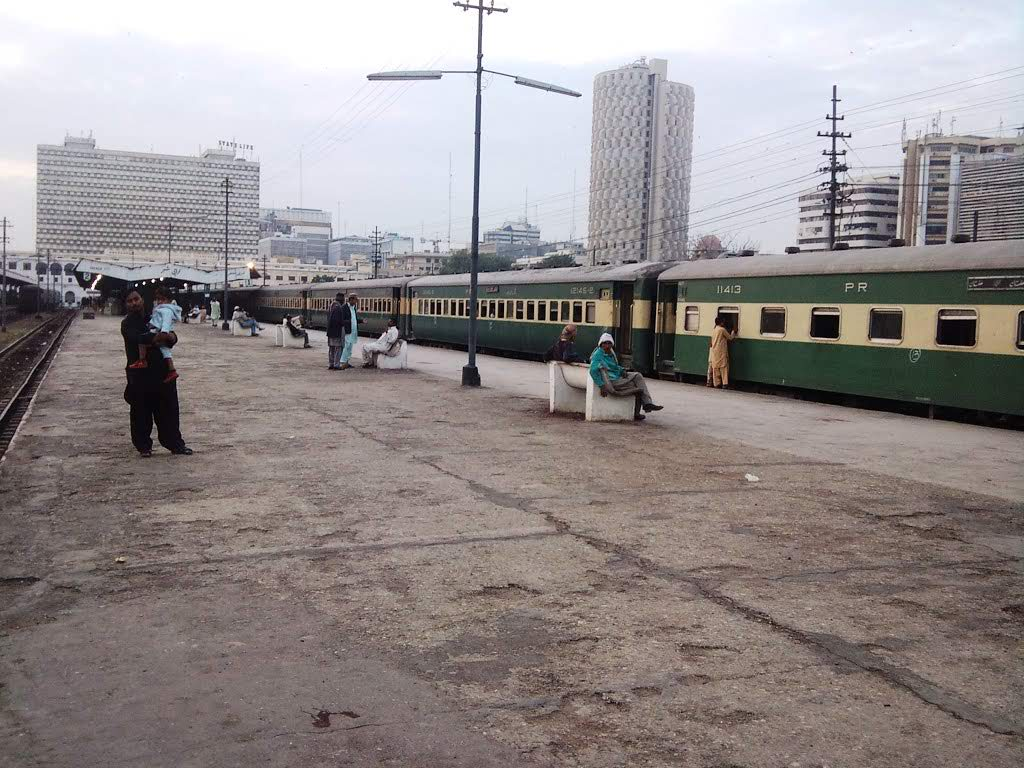
Platform with the Habib Bank Plaza visible

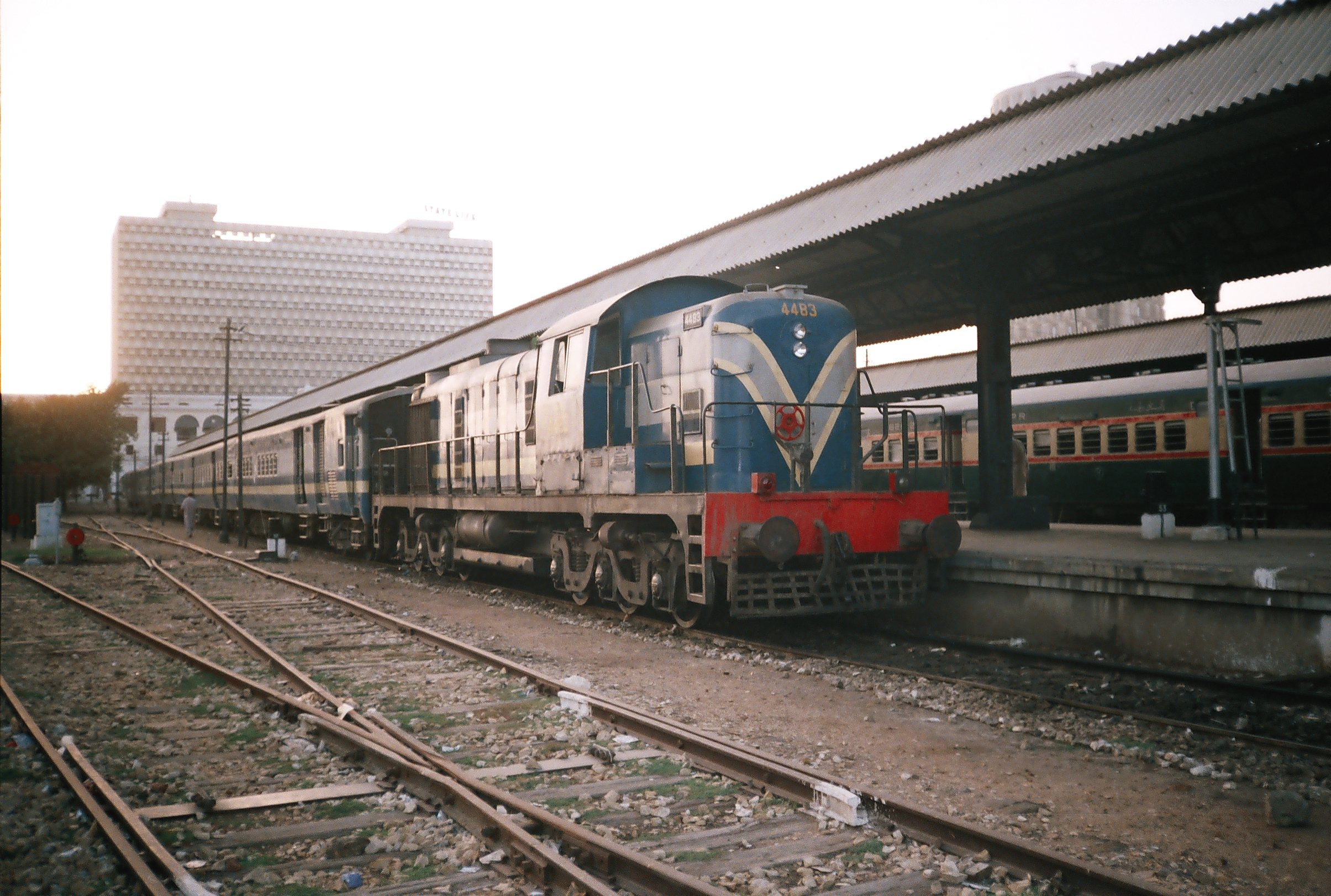
A train of Karachi Circular Railway
