= Shalimar Express (Pakistan) =

Pakistani passenger train

Overview
- Service type: Express
- First service: 1979
- Current operator: Pakistan Railways
- Website: http://www.pakrail.gov.pk

Route
- Termini: Karachi Cantonment; Lahore Junction
- Stops: 12
- Distance travelled: 1,286 kilometres (799 mi)
- Average journey time: 18 hours & 40 minutes
- Service frequency: Daily
- Train numbers: 27UP (Karachi→Lahore); 28DN (Lahore→Karachi)

On-board services
- Classes: Economy Class; AC Standard; AC Business; Parlour Car
- Sleeping arrangements: Available
- Catering facilities: Available

Technical
- Track gauge: 1,676 mm (5 ft 6 in)
- Operating speed: 67 km/h
- Track owner: Pakistan Railways
Route map
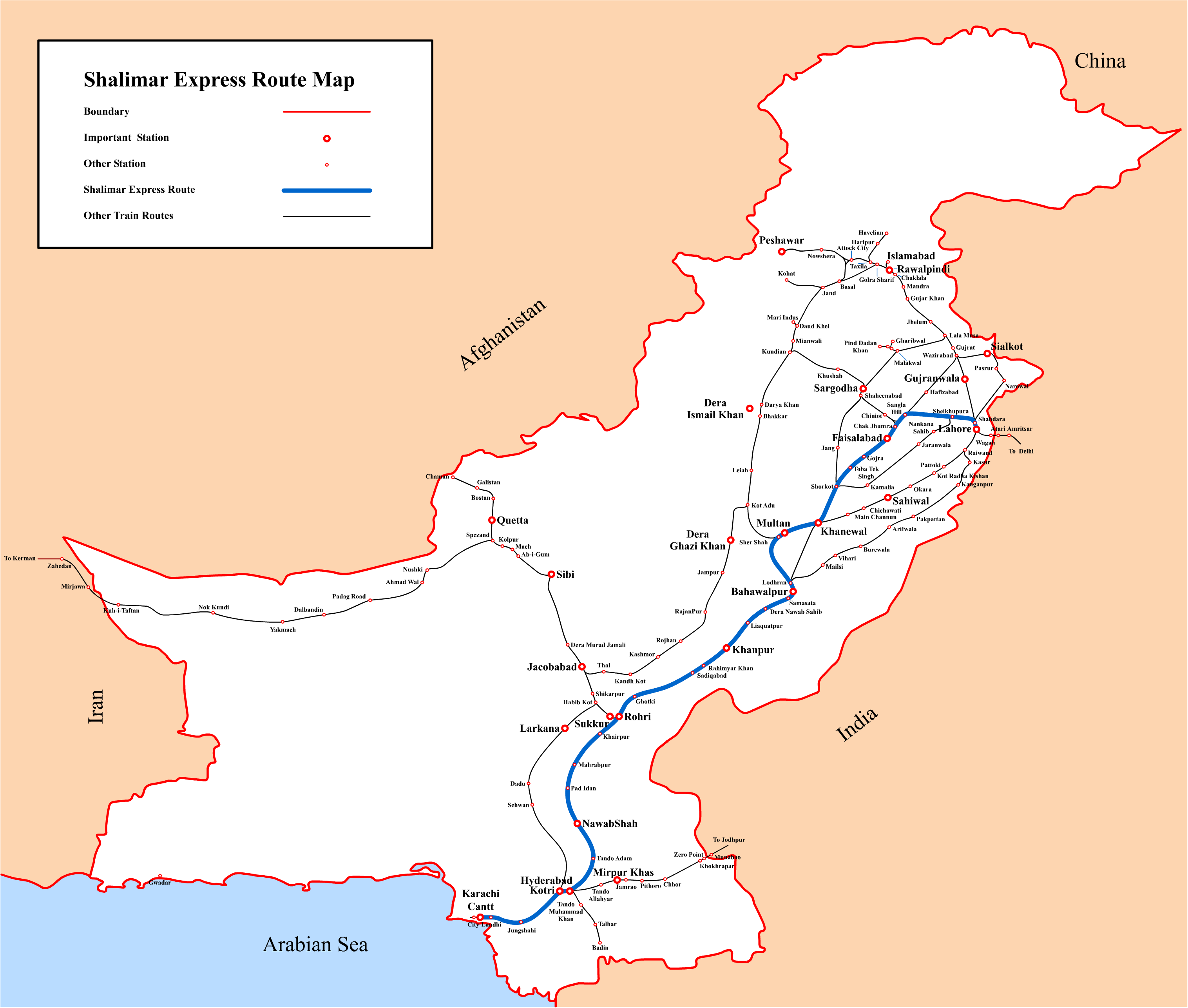

Shalimar Express (Urdu: شالیمار ایکسپریس) is a passenger train operated daily by Pakistan Railways between Karachi and Lahore. The trip takes approximately 18 hours and 40 minutes to cover a published distance of 1,286 kilometres (799 mi), traveling along a stretch of the Karachi–Peshawar Railway Line,

== History ==
The Shalimar Express was inaugurated in 1979 by then President Zia-ul-Haq. The train at that time only consisted of 2 parlour coaches and had only two stops and covered the 1,214 kilometres (754 mi) distance from Karachi to Lahore in 16 hours. Pakistan Railways suspended Shalimar Express on 27 July 2010 because it was running in loss. After 19 months of suspension, Pakistan Railways restarted it with the collaboration of a private company Air Rail Services on 24 February 2012. Shalimar Express currently consists of seven economy, two AC lower, one parlour car, one dining car, one power van and one luggage van coaches. The train now covers the 1,286 kilometres (799 mi) distance from Karachi to Lahore in 19 hours.

Shalimar Express was the first ever all air-conditioned train to run on the Pakistan Railway network. It consisted of 14 parlour coaches, two double capacity power vans and a dining car. The parlour coaches were manufactured in Pakistan carriage factory, through the acquisition of German rail technology. Each coach consisted of 52 reclining seats, with comfortable room space and two main televisions (installed in 1987). In short, the coach interiors was replicated to match that of an aeroplane. Shalimar Express got the first ever signature Pakistan Railway livery, that is used to date. It consisted of two dark green strips with a yellow middle livery, while the windows of the train were tinted black to prevent heat and sunlight from entering the coaches.

For over eight years since the train's inauguration, the train had two stops along it 1,263 km route between Lahore and Karachi, which were Rohri and Khanewal. The train covered its distance in 16 hours and for a few years, it even covered it in just 15 hours and 25 minutes. The train began its journey at 6:00 am both ways and reached either destination at 10:00 pm the same day. Between 1987 and 1994, Multan was also added to its stop (earlier, it used to bypass Multan by taking the Khanewal-Jahania-Lodhran route), during which the train began journey at 7:00 am either side.

Initially the train was hauled by a 3000 horse power locomotive, imported from the General Motors company (EMD), United States in 1975. However, after the import of Hitachi Bombardier series from Japan in 1982, the GM engine retired and the new locomotives were put to work. Since the Hitachi engines were just 2000 HP each, two units were deployed to haul the Shalimar Express, but their poor quality led to a disruption and delay in the train service causing agitation among the passengers. Later in 1985, new EMD locomotives were imported, this time manufactured in the Henschel factory in Germany, that were used to pull the Shalimar Express.

== Route ==
- Karachi Cantonment–Lahore Junction via Khanewal - Wazirabad Branch line

== Station stops ==
- Karachi Cantonment
- Drigh Road
- Hyderabad Junction
- Nawabshah
- Rohri Junction
- Ghotki
- Rahim Yar Khan
- Khanpur
- Bahawalpur
- Multan Cantonment
- Khanewal Junction
- Toba Tek Singh
- Faisalabad
- Lahore Junction

== Incidents ==
- 2013: Three passengers were killed and 15 were injured after an explosion ripped through a compartment of the Karachi-bound Shalimar Express at Chutiana railway station on 5 August 2013.
- 2017: Two people were killed and 10 injured after the Karachi-bound Shalimar Express collided with an oil tanker at a level crossing near Sheikhupura. The accident occurred as the railway crossing's barrier was left opened. The engine and five bogies of the train, including the luggage compartment, and a power plant caught fire in the accident.
