= Karachi Cantonment railway station =

Railway station in Karachi, Pakistan

Karachi Cantonment Railway Station کراچی چھاؤنی ریلوے اسٹیشن
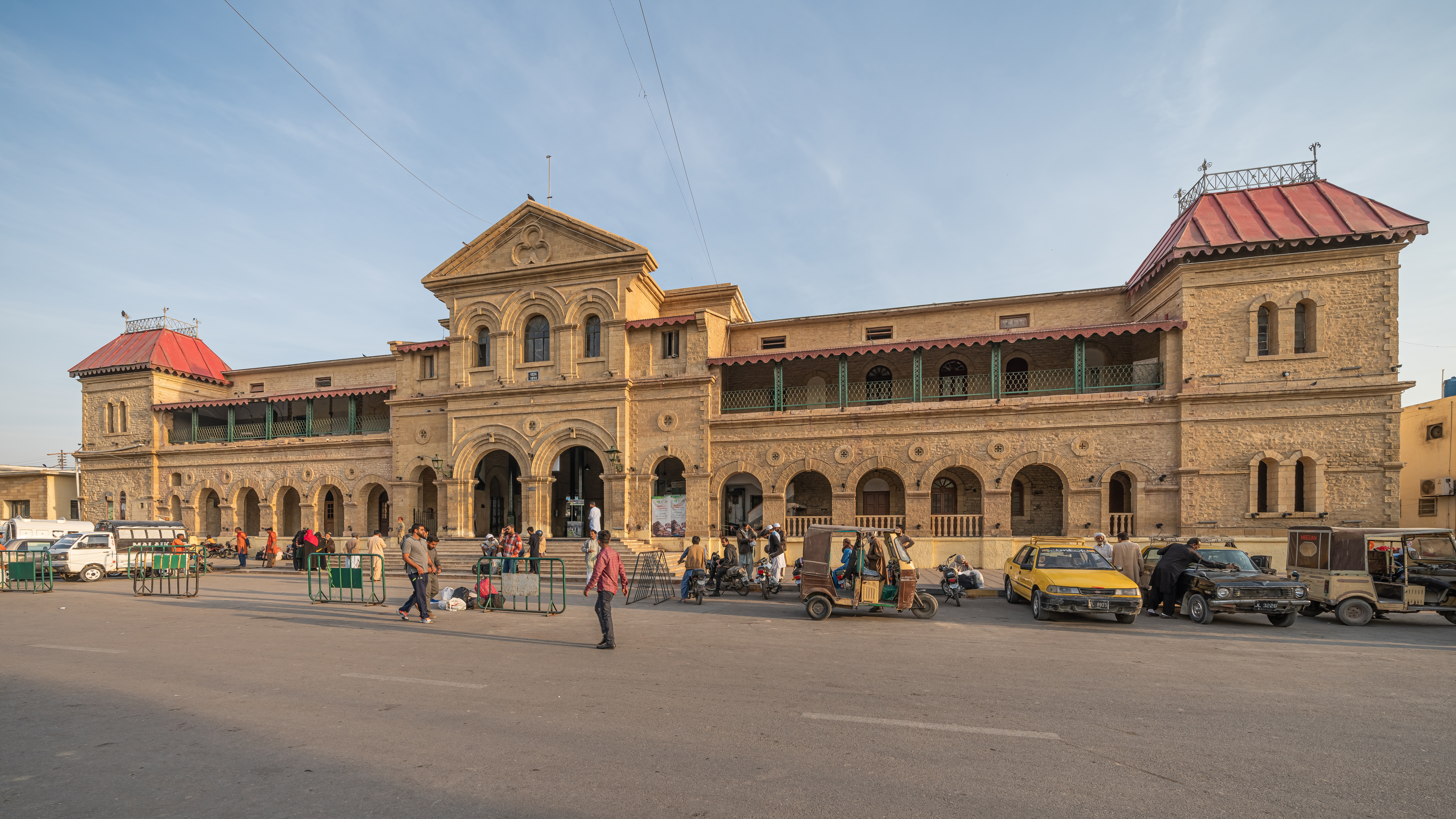
- Station building

General information
- Location: Dr Daudpota Road; Karachi-75530, Sindh; Pakistan
- Coordinates: 24°50′38″N 67°02′28″E
- Owner: Ministry of Railways
- Lines: Karachi–Peshawar Railway Line; Karachi Circular Railway
- Platforms: 8
- Tracks: 10
- Connections: 22-A, 1-D, 4-H, 19-D

Construction
- Structure type: Standard (on ground station)
- Platform levels: 2
- Parking: Available
- Cycle facilities: Available
- Accessible: Available

Other information
- Status: Functional
- Station code: KC
- Fare zone: Pakistan Railways Karachi Zone

History
- Opened: 1898; 128 years ago
- Former names: Frere Street Station

Services
| Preceding station | Pakistan Railways | Following station |
|---|---|---|
| Karachi City towards Kiamari | Karachi–Peshawar Line | Departure Yard towards Peshawar Cantonment |
| Preceding station | Karachi Circular Railway | Following station |
| Karachi City Terminus | Main line | Chanesar towards Dabheji |
- Computerized Ticketing Counters Luggage Checking System Parking Disabled Access Food Plaza Kiosks WC Taxi Stand Public Transportation Metro interchange
Location

Karachi Cantonment Railway Station (Urdu: کراچی چھاؤنی ریلوے اسٹیشن, Sindhi: ڪراچي ڇانوڻي ريلوي اسٽيشن) (often abbreviated as Karachi Cantt.) is one of the busiest and principal railway stations in Karachi, Sindh, Pakistan. It is situated near Dr. Daudpota Road, Saddar.

== History ==
It was earlier known as Frere Street Station. Construction of the station began in 1896 and was completed in 1898 at a total cost of 80,000 rupees. The present building of Karachi Cantt station has been declared a protected heritage site by the Government of Sindh.

== Facilities ==
Karachi Cantonment Station is equipped with all basic facilities. The station has current and advance reservation offices for Pakistan Railways as well as cargo and parcel facilities. Retail shops are found on Platform 1, including restaurants such as Rehmat-e-Shereen and Pizza Hut.

== Services ==
The following trains originate/stop at Karachi Cantonment station:

| TRAIN NUMBER | TRAIN NAME | ORIGIN | DESTINATION |
|---|---|---|---|
| 27 UP | SHALIMAR EXPRESS | TERMINUS | LAHORE |
| 11 UP | HAZARA EXPRESS | KARACHI CITY | HAVELIAN |
| 13 UP | AWAM EXPRESS | ORIGIN | PESHAWAR CANTT |
| 151 UP | SHAH LATIF EXPRESS | KARACHI CITY | MIRPUR KHAS |
| 29 UP | SINDH EXPRESS | TERMINUS | MULTAN CANTT |
| 47 UP | REHMAN BABA EXPRESS | TERMINUS | PESHAWAR CANTT |
| 45 UP | PAKISTAN EXPRESS | TERMINUS | RAWALPINDI |
| 09 UP | ALLAMA IQBAL EXPRESS | TERMINUS | SIALKOT |
| 31 UP | JINNAH EXPRESS | TERMINUS | LAHORE |
| 41 UP | KARAKORUM EXPRESS | TERMINUS | LAHORE |
| 33 UP | PAK BUSINESS EXPRESS | TERMINUS | LAHORE |
| 149 UP | MEHRAN EXPRESS | KARACHI CITY | MIRPUR KHAS |
| 15 UP | KARACHI EXPRESS | TERMINUS | LAHORE |
| 17 UP | MILLAT EXPRESS | TERMINUS | MALAKWAL |
| 07 UP | TEZGAM EXPRESS | TERMINUS | RAWALPINDI |
| 25 UP | BAHAUDIN ZAKRIYA EXPRESS | KARACHI CITY | MULTAN CANTT |
| 03 UP | BOLAN MAIL EXPRESS | KARACHI CITY | QUETTA |
| 43 UP | SHAH HUSSAIN EXPRESS | TERMINUS | LAHORE |
| 37 UP | FAREED EXPRESS | KARACHI CITY | LAHORE |
| 19 UP | KHUSHAL KHAN KHATTAK EXPRESS | KARACHI CITY | PESHAWAR CANTT |
| 35 UP | SIR SYED EXPRESS | TERMINUS | RAWALPINDI |
| 05 UP | GREEN LINE EXPRESS | TERMINUS | ISLAMABAD |
| 01 UP | KHYBER MAIL EXPRESS | TERMINUS | PESHAWAR CANTT |
| 145 UP | SUKKER EXPRESS | KARACHI CITY | JACOBABAD |
| 405 UP | THAR EXPRESS | TERMINUS | ZERO POINT |

== Gallery ==
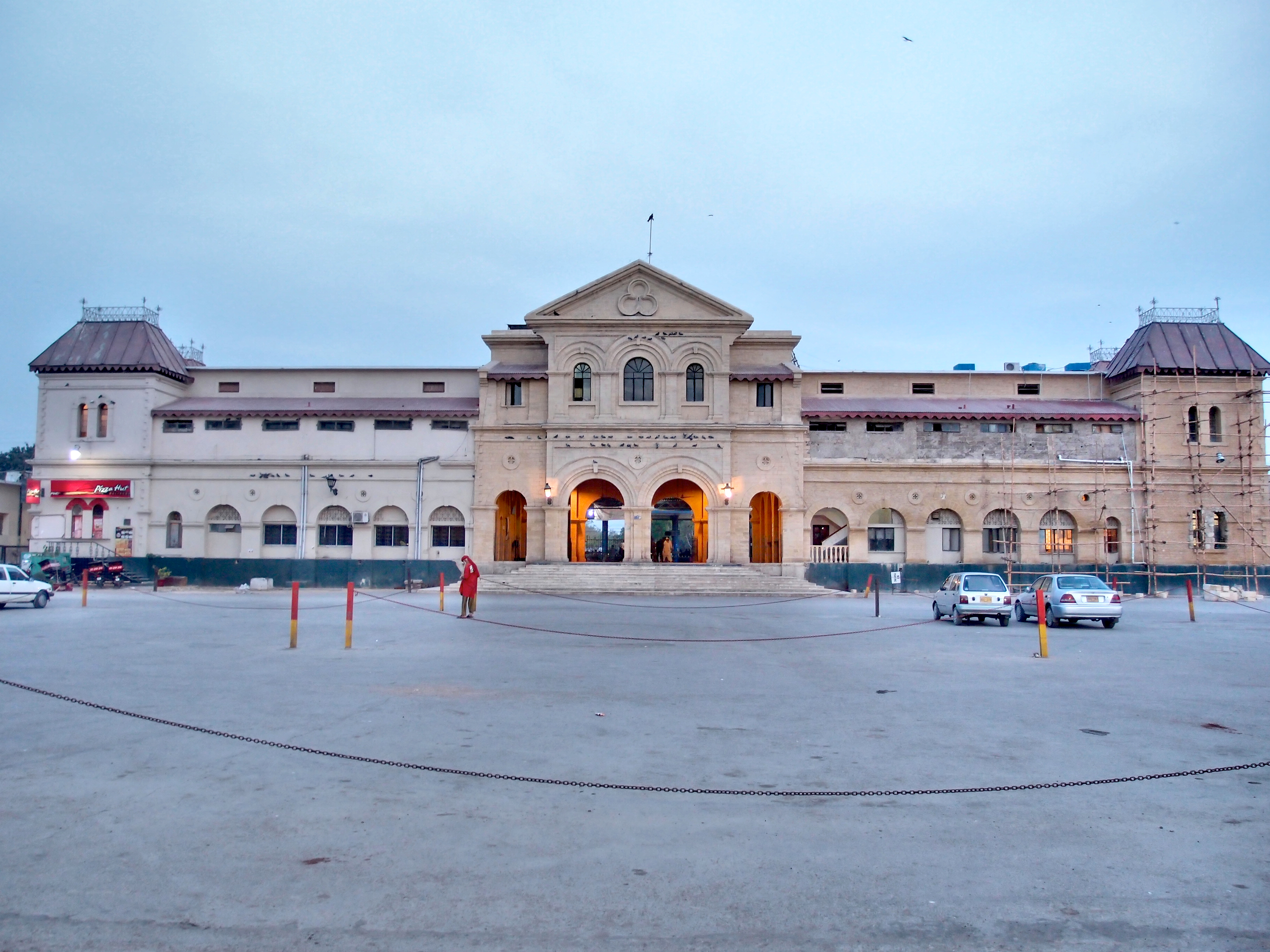
Entrance

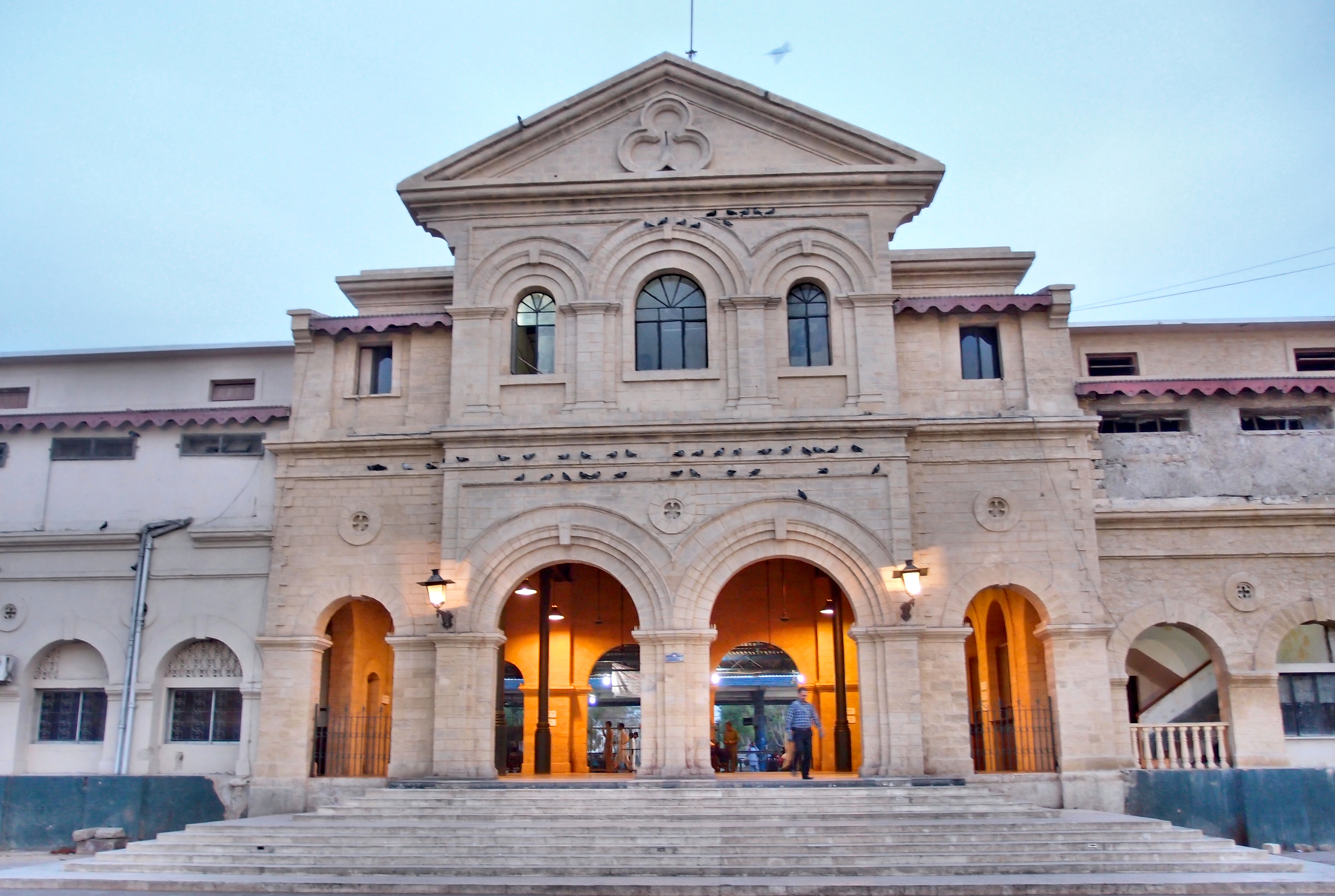
Entrance detail

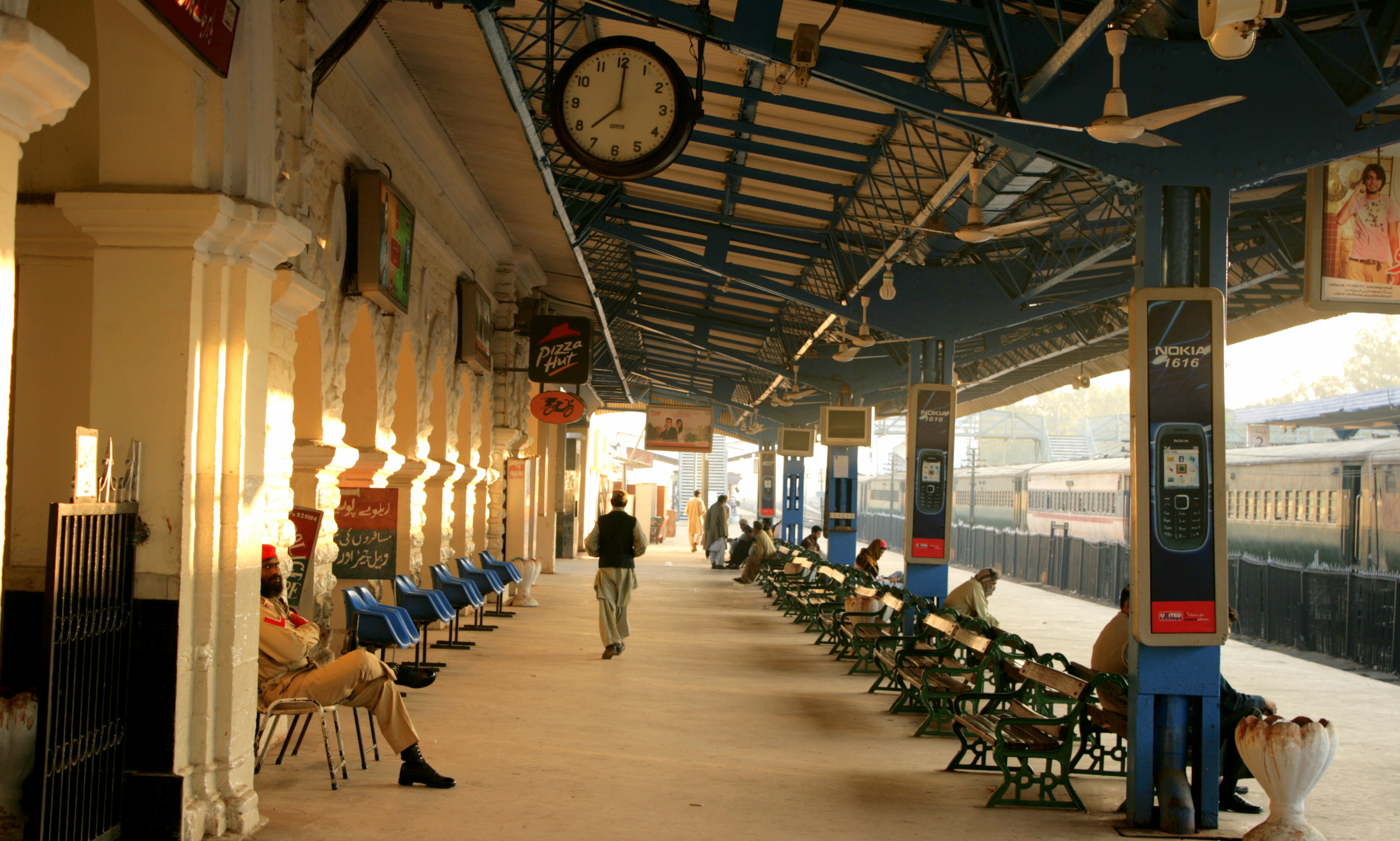
Platform

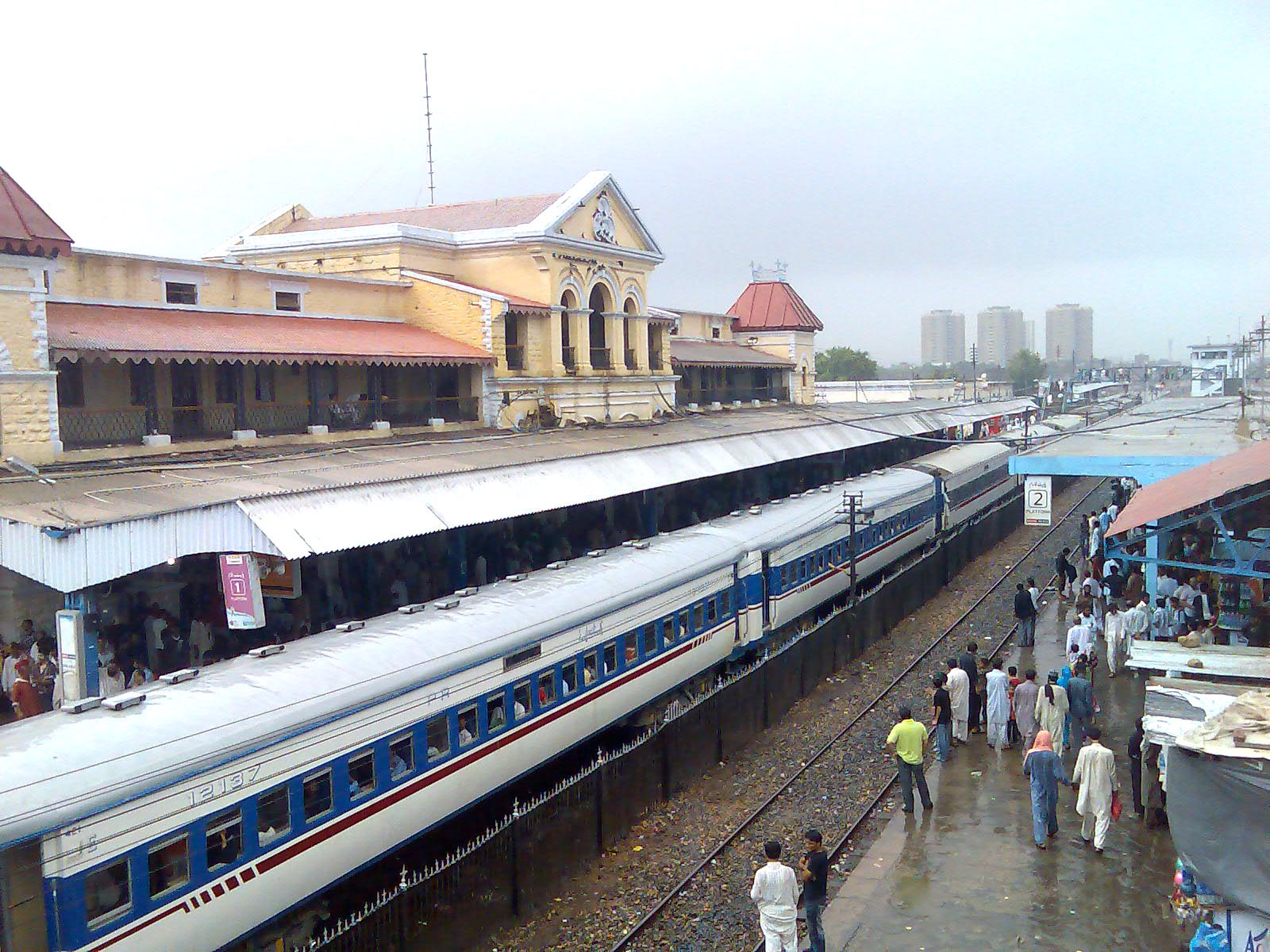
Train at Karachi Cantonment railway station

Overview

== See also ==
- Karachi
- List of railway stations in Pakistan
- Karachi City Station
- Landhi Railway Station
- Drigh Road Railway Station
- Pakistan Railways
- Karachi Circular Railway
