= Orangi railway station =

Railway station in Karachi, Pakistan

Orangi Station اورنگی اسٹیشن
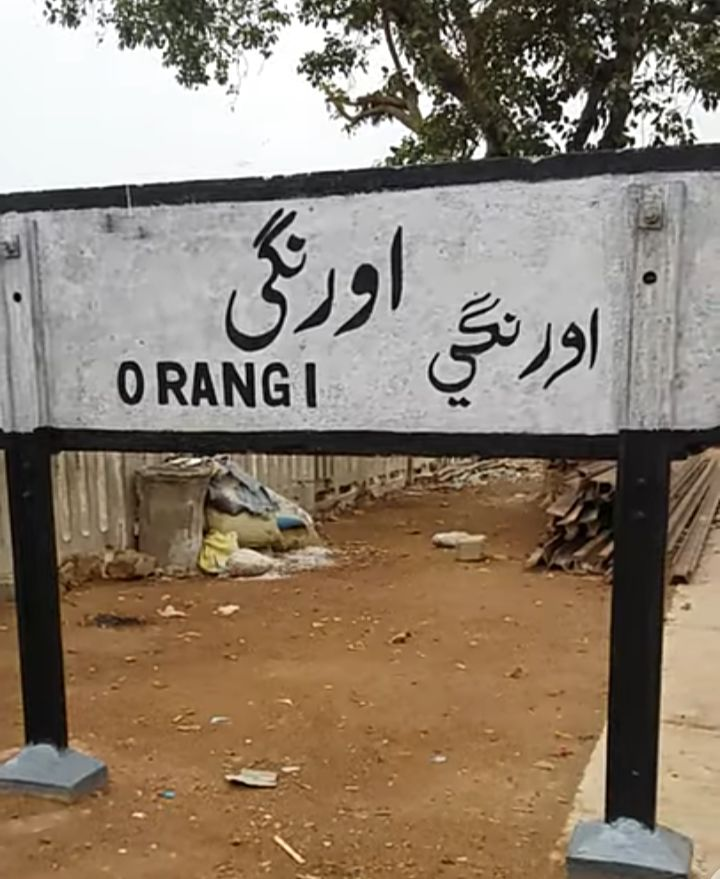

General information
- Coordinates: 24.9157°N 67.0198°E
- Owner: Ministry of Railways
- Line: Karachi Circular Railway

Other information
- Station code: ORG

History
- Opened: 1964; 62 years ago

Services
Preceding station	Karachi Circular Railway	Following station
North Nazimabad towards Drigh Road Junction	Loop line	Manghopir towards Orangi
North Nazimabad Clockwise	Loop line (closed 1999, reopening proposed)	Manghopir Anticlockwise
Location

Orangi railway station (Urdu: اورنگی ریلوے اسٹیشن, is located in Paposh Nagar, Aurangabad, near Orangi Nala, Karachi, Pakistan. KCR was fully operational between 1964 and 1994, until it was abruptly shutdown in 1999. Since 2001, several restart attempts were sought and in November 2020, the KCR partially revived operations with the orders of Supreme Court of Pakistan. Currently, KCR continues its operation from Orangi railway station departing at 4:30 p.m. and reaching Dhabeji railway station at 7:35 p.m. via Manghopir, SITE Station, Shah Abdul Latif Station, Baldia Railway Station, Liyari Station, Wazir Mansion, Karachi City Station, Karachi Cantt, Departure Yard, Drigh Road, Drigh Colony, Airport, Malir Colony, Malir, Landhi, Jumma Goth, Bin Qasim, and Marshalling Yard Pipri.

== Karachi Circular Railway ==
The KCR train, consisting of six coaches, allowed passengers to travel within the area. Each coach has a capacity of up to 100 passengers (64 seated, 36 standing). The locals shared their experiences at the station’s clearing of encroachments and the resumption of train services.

The new 14-kilometer KCR line between Orangi and City Station consists of six stations and 12 level crossings. The introductory fare is estimated at PKR 30, regardless of the distance traveled.

The train is reported to be making brief spots at Manghopir, SITE Town, Shah Abdul Latif, Baldia Town, Lyari Town, and Wazir Mansion en-route to City Station. From then on, the train would cover another 60 kilometers towards Dhabeji.

Revival efforts of KCR had been proposed several times since becoming defunct in 1999 and remained unfulfilled mainly due to lack of financial and political backing. In May 2017, the federal government approved a Rs. 27.9 billion (US$97 million) restoration package for the KCR, however delays and disputes with the Sindh provincial government ultimately led to the cancellation of the funding.

Civil society has constantly fought for the revival of the KCR. Due to pressure both from outside and within government circles, a plan for its rehabilitation, financing, and implementation has been developed. In August 2020, the federal government approved a Rs. 10.5 billion (US$36 million) rehabilitation package for the KCR restoration. The funding is slated to cover only phase one and phase two of KCR's restoration project, similar to the restoration of the Karachi-Peshawar Railway Line, according to Ameer Muhammad Daudpota.

== History ==
Karachi Circular Railway came into being during President Ayub Khan's tenure, who suggested the use of trains as a means for short travel in Karachi. KCR Operations began in 1964 under the administration of Pakistan Railways, with the aims to provide better transportation facilities to Karachi's growing population and outlying surrounding suburban communities. The original KCR line extended from Karachi City station and ended at Drigh Road station and carried 6 million passengers that year. Its instant success made Pakistan Railways a significant profit in its first year of operation. In 1970, KCR was expanded further east to Landhi Junction station while new track was extended westwards, thus opening Karachi Port Trust Halt station and Wazir Mansion station in 1970. Throughout the 1970s, track was further extended westwards and northwards towards North Nazimabad, forming a "loop line" which circled around several of Karachi's residential and industrial areas. At its peak, KCR ran 104 daily trains, of which 80 trains ran on the main line, while the remaining 24 trains ran on the loop line. During the 1990s, cost of operations increased while revenues dropped due to a deteriorating commuter service and increasing culture of fare dodging. Private transporters during this time also contracted KCR staff and by 1994 KCR was in incurring major losses due to mismanagement. As a result, the vast majority of trains were discontinued with only a few running on the loop. Unable to withstand the pressures of a growing transport mafia, Pakistan Railways abandoned the KCR in 1999.

The official reason for the discontinuation was that Pakistan Railways was said to be making a loss by running the trains all over the city with few passengers taking advantage of the facility. Another version suggests that private transporters conspired with some corrupt staffers in the railways to fulfill their desire to bag the bulk of passengers for themselves The result caused instant gridlock on Karachi's streets. Severe criticisms were lodged at Pakistan Railways mismanagement as well as Karachi's "road transport mafia". In 2005, revival plans for the KCR were initiated to fulfill the growing transportation needs of Karachi, but never fully materialized. In 2009, the Karachi Urban Transport Corporation was proposed in which KCR would be operated as a semi-autonomous body. Pakistan Railways would have 60% share in the corporation, Sindh government 25% and Karachi 15%.

== Route ==
The KCR will consist of a loop line from Karachi City to Drigh Road via Liaquatabad. 44 kilometres will be revived with an additional 6 kilometre elevated dual track from Karachi City to Jinnah International Airport, allowing the KCR to connect to the Pakistan Railway main line. Existing railway tracks and 30 stations would be completely rebuilt on bridges. KCR would be used by 500,000 passengers/day which would increase to 1 million in later years. KCR will have 250 modern driverless electric bullet trains which would run 17 hours a day and 7 days a week. This project is also part of CPEC. Total cost of the project would be 294 billion PKR. The KCR would be run by the Sindh Government through Karachi Urban Transport Corporation (KUTC). Construction started in 2022 by FWO and would complete by 2025.

== Lines ==
=== Main line ===
- Karachi City
- Karachi Cantonment
- Chanesar Halt (Abandoned)
- Karsaz (Abandoned)
- Drigh Road > Loop line
- Drigh Colony
- Airport Halt
- Malir > Malir line
- Landhi Junction
- Jummah Goth
- Bin Qasim Port
- Gaddar
- Dabheji

=== Loop line ===
Closed section

- Depot Hill
- Karachi University
- Urdu College
- Gilani
- Liaqatabad

Opened section

- Orangi (Formerly known as North Nazimabad)
- Manghopir
- SITE
- Shah Abdul Latif
- Baldia
- Lyari
- Wazir Mansion
- Karachi Port Trult (Abandoned)

=== Malir line ===
- Malir Colony
- Malir Cantonment

== See also ==
- List of railway stations in Pakistan
- Pakistan Railways
