= North Nazimabad railway station =

Railway station in Karachi, Pakistan

North Nazimabad Station شمالی ناظم آباد اسٹیشن

General information
- Coordinates: 24.9214°N 67.0357°E
- Owner: Ministry of Railways
- Line: Karachi Circular Railway

Other information
- Station code: NAA

History
- Opened: 1970

Services
Preceding station	Karachi Circular Railway	Following station
Liaquatabad towards Drigh Road Junction	Loop line	Orangi Terminus
Location

North Nazimabad railway station (Urdu: شمالی ناظم آباد اسٹیشن, Sindhi: اتر ناظم آباد ريلوي اسٽيشن) is located in Karachi, Pakistan, and serves the North Nazimabad suburb. North Nazimabad railway station in Karachi, Pakistan was established in 1970 as part of the Karachi Circular Railway (KCR) project. The station was built to serve the growing population of North Nazimabad, a suburb of Karachi.

== See also ==
- List of railway stations in Pakistan
- Pakistan Railways
