= Karachi University railway station =

Railway station in Karachi, Pakistan

Karachi University Station کراچی یونیورسٹی اسٹیشن
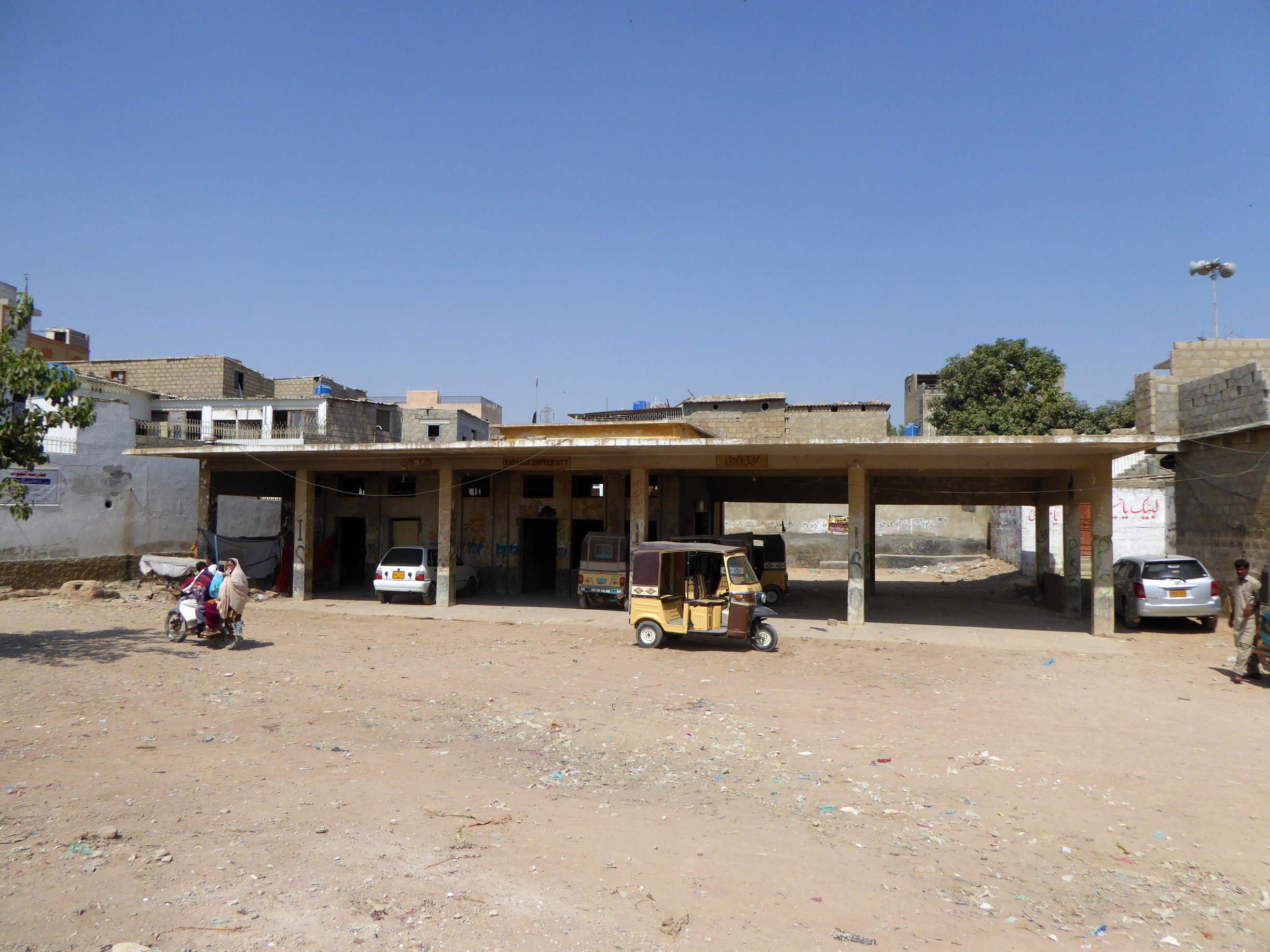

General information
- Coordinates: 24.9158°N 67.1002°E
- Owner: Ministry of Railways
- Line: Karachi Circular Railway
- Platforms: 3
- Tracks: 3

Other information
- Station code: KYXU

Services
Preceding station	Karachi Circular Railway	Following station
Depot Hill towards Drigh Road Junction	Loop line	Urdu College towards Orangi
Location

Karachi University railway station (Urdu: کراچی یونیورسٹی ریلوے اسٹیشن, Sindhi: ڪراچي يونيورسٽي اسٽيشن) is located in Pakistan. It is located near the University of Karachi.

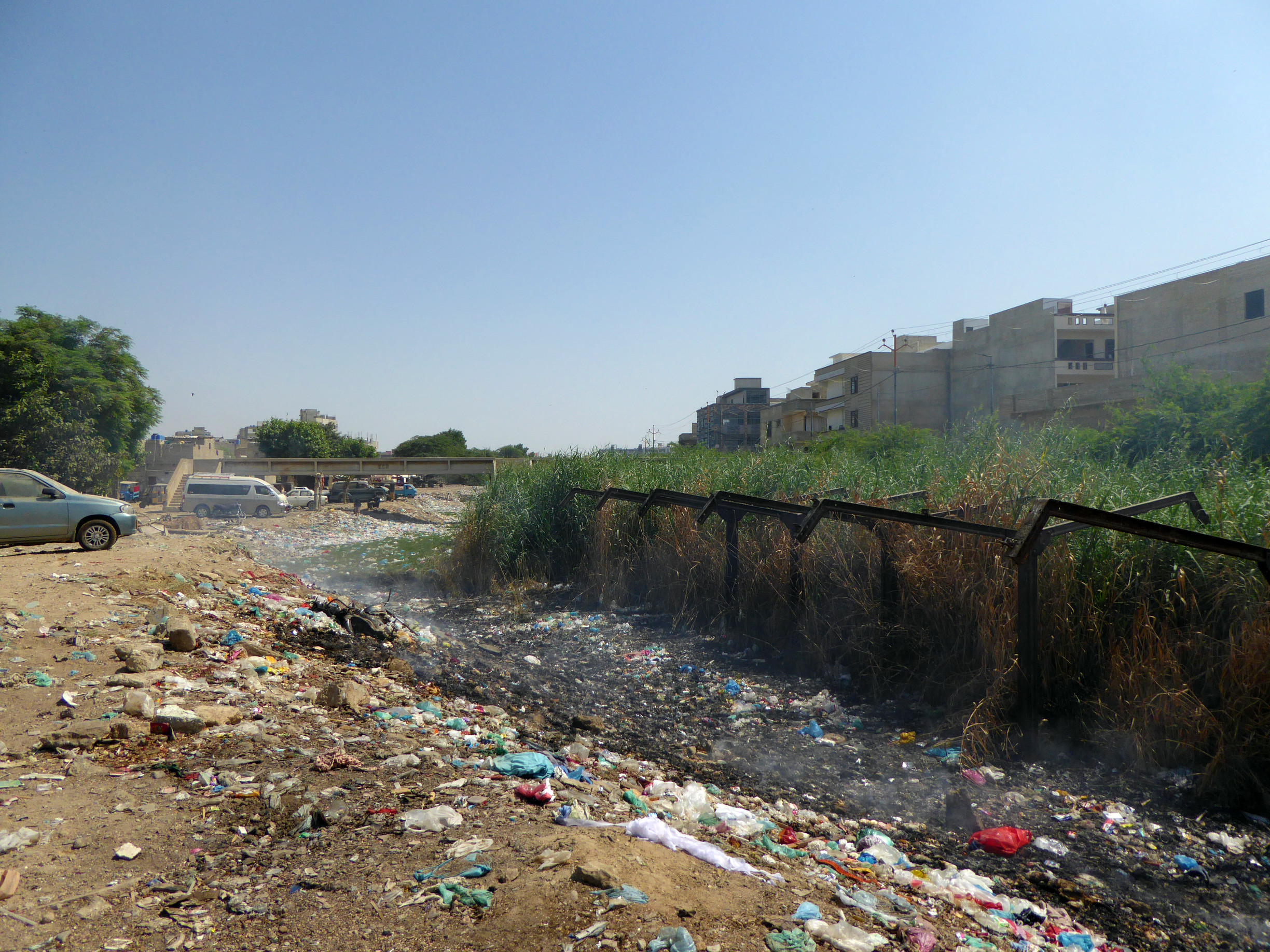
A view of Karachi University railway station platforms, on 13 October 2020

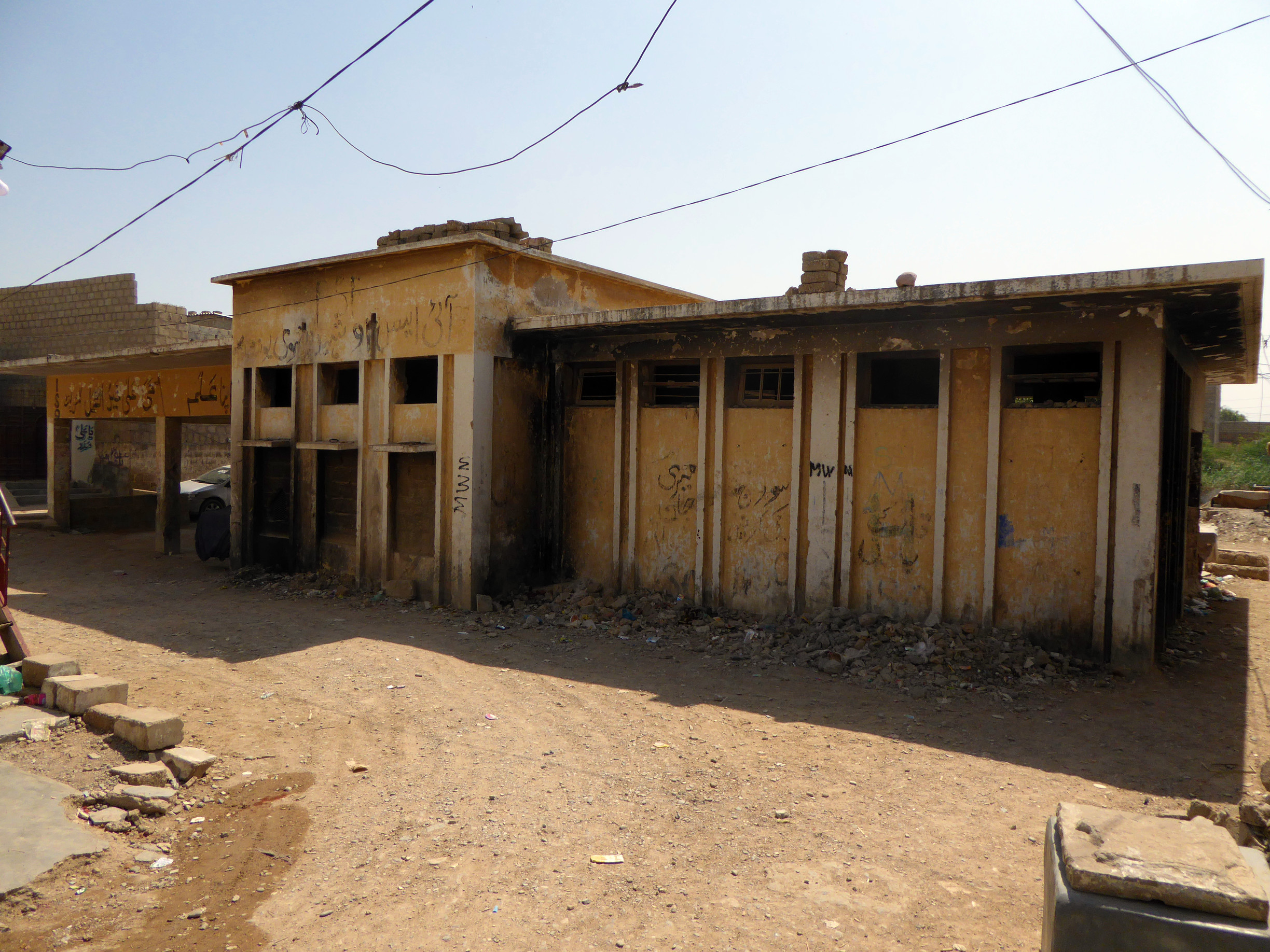
An external view of Karachi University railway station building, on 13 October 2020

== See also ==
- List of railway stations in Pakistan
- Pakistan Railways
