= Jummah Goth railway station =

Railway station in Pakistan

Jummah Goth Railway Station جمعھ حماہتی گوٹھ اسٹیشن

General information
- Coordinates: 24.8436°N 67.2694°E
- Owner: Ministry of Railways
- Lines: Karachi–Peshawar Railway Line; Karachi Circular Railway

Other information
- Station code: JMTH

Services
Preceding station	Pakistan Railways	Following station
Landhi Junction towards Kiamari	Karachi–Peshawar Line	Bin Qasim towards Peshawar Cantonment
Preceding station	Karachi Circular Railway	Following station
Landhi Junction towards Karachi City	Main line	Bin Qasim towards Dabheji
Location

Jummah Goth Railway Station (Urdu: جمعہ حماہتی گوٹھ ریلوے اسٹیشن, Sindhi: جمعو حماهتي ڳوٺ ريلوي اسٽيشن) is located at Jummah Goth near Korangi in Karachi, Pakistan.

== See also ==
- List of railway stations in Pakistan
- Pakistan Railways
