= Drigh Colony Junction Halt railway station =

Railway station in Sindh, Pakistan

Drigh Colony Junction Halt Railway Station ڈرگ کالونی اسٹیشن
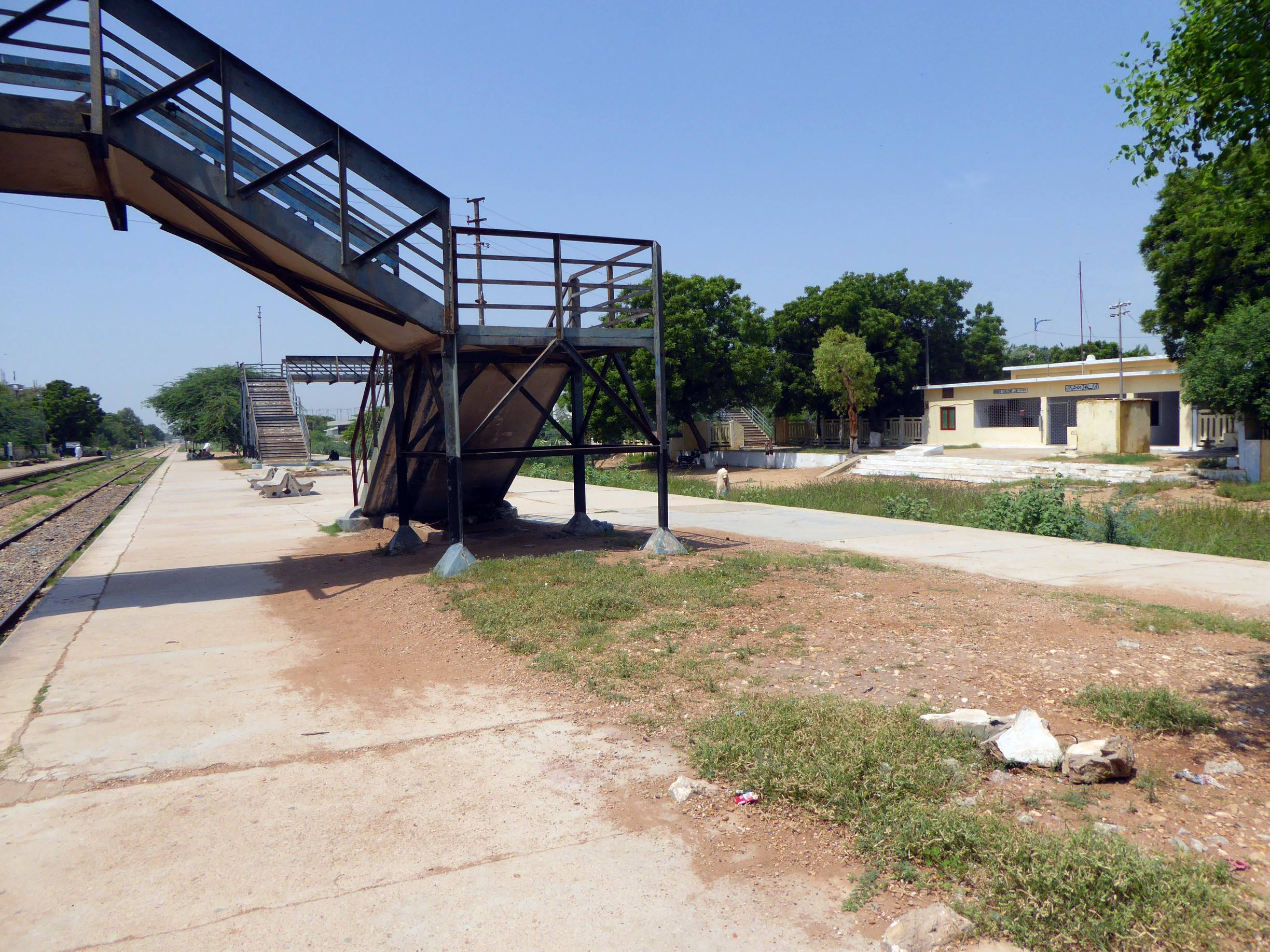

General information
- Coordinates: 24.8861°N 67.1441°E
- Owner: Ministry of Railways
- Lines: Karachi–Peshawar Railway Line; Karachi Circular Railway
- Platforms: 3
- Tracks: 4

Construction
- Platform levels: 1

Other information
- Station code: DCL

Services
Preceding station	Pakistan Railways	Following station
Drigh Road towards Kiamari	Karachi–Peshawar Line	Malir towards Peshawar Cantonment
Preceding station	Karachi Circular Railway	Following station
Drigh Road Junction towards Karachi City	Main line	Airport Halt towards Dabheji
Location

Drigh Colony Junction Halt Railway Station (Urdu: ڈرگ کالونی ریلوے اسٹیشن, Sindhi: ڊرگ ڪالوني ريلوي اسٽيشن) is located in Shah Faisal Colony, Karachi, Pakistan near Jinnah International Airport.

== Gallery ==
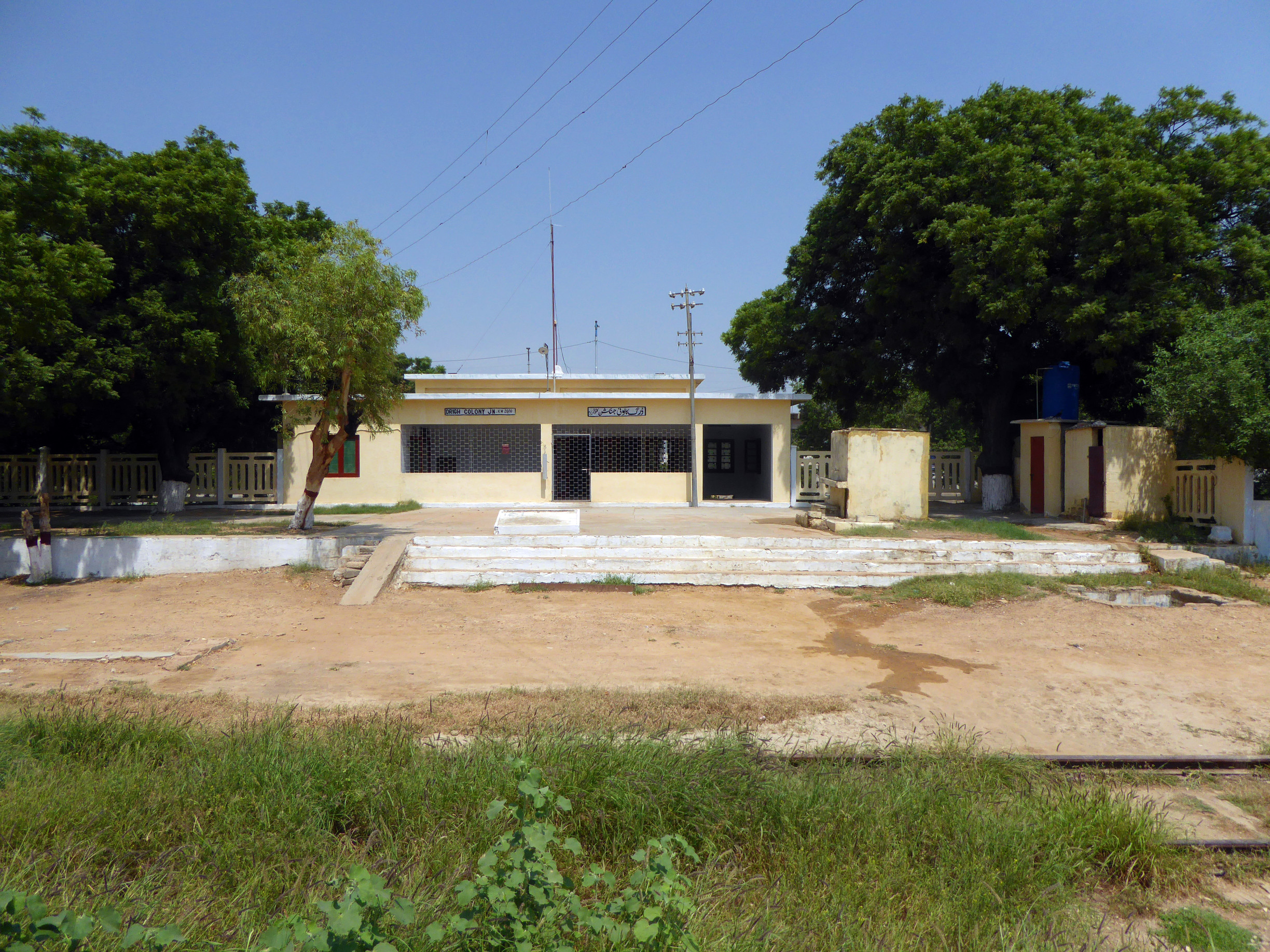
Drigh Colony railway station building

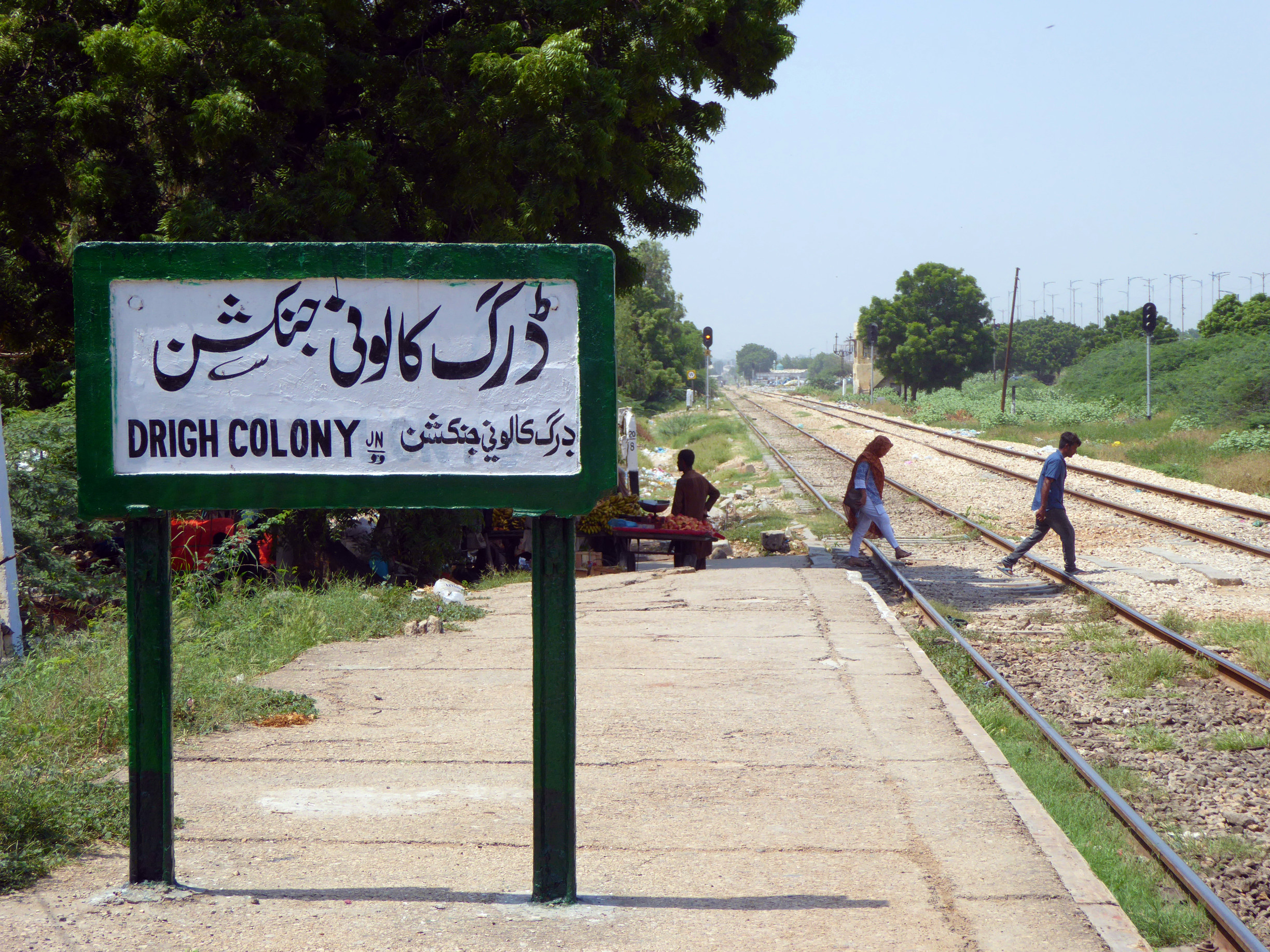
Platform signage

== See also ==
- List of railway stations in Pakistan
- Pakistan Railways
