= Drigh Road Junction railway station =

Railway station in Sindh, Pakistan

Coordinates: 24.8863°N 67.1261°E

Drigh Road Junction Railway Station ڈرگ روڈ ریلوے اسٹیشن
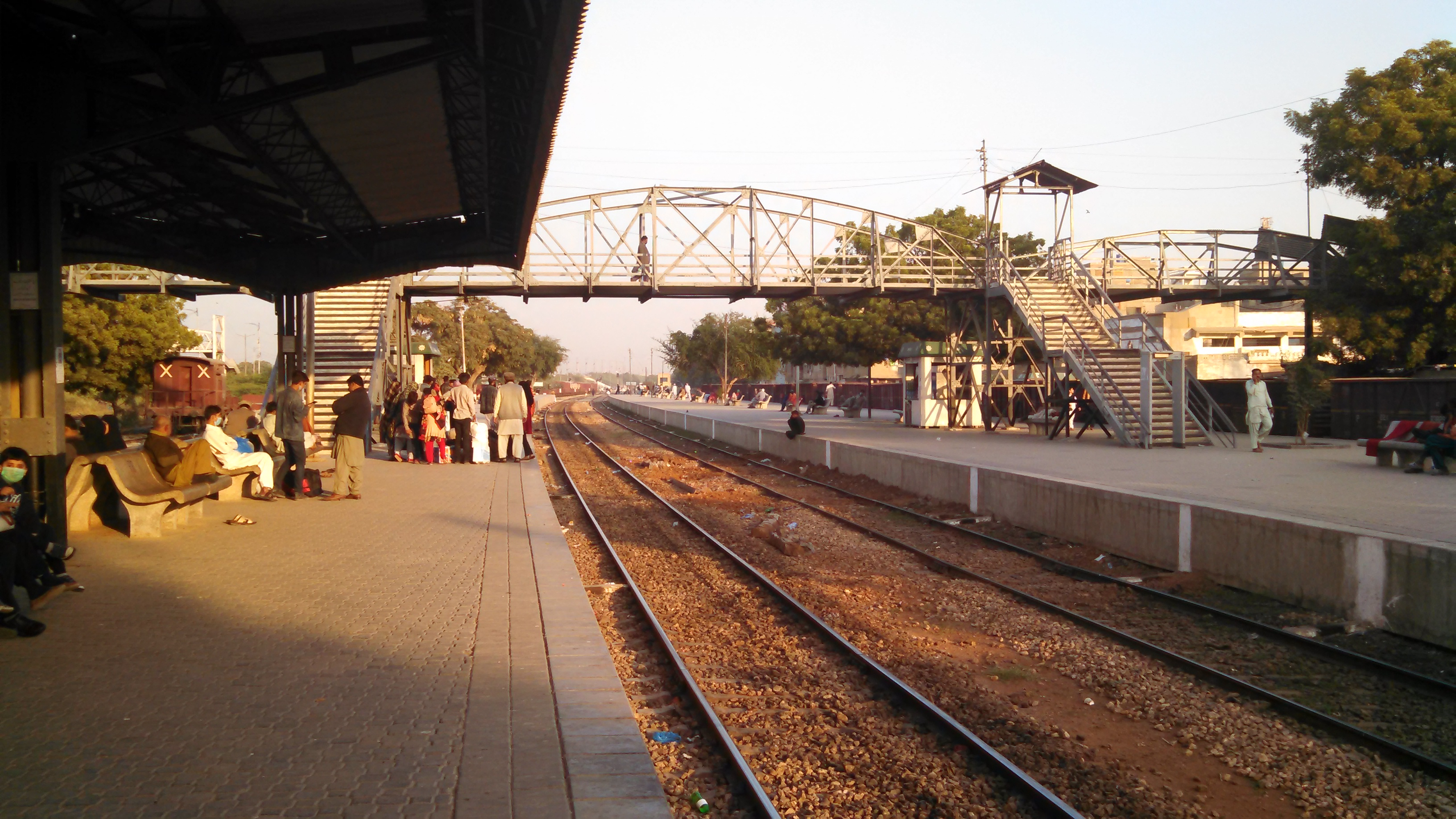
- Drigh Road railway station

General information
- Owner: Ministry of Railways
- Lines: Karachi–Peshawar Railway Line; Karachi Circular Railway
- Platforms: 4
- Tracks: 6

Construction
- Platform levels: 1
- Parking: Available

Other information
- Station code: DID

History
- Opened: 1889

Services
Preceding station	Pakistan Railways	Following station
Departure Yard towards Kiamari	Karachi–Peshawar Line	Drigh Colony towards Peshawar Cantonment
Preceding station	Karachi Circular Railway	Following station
Karsaz towards Karachi City	Main line	Drigh Colony towards Dabheji
Terminus	Loop line	Depot Hill towards Orangi
Location

Drigh Road Junction Railway Station (Urdu: ڈرگ روڈ ریلوے اسٹیشن, Sindhi: ڊرگ روڊ ريلوي اسٽيشن) is a railway station in Karachi, Pakistan, near the Jinnah International Airport. It is situated near Drigh Road Flyover on Sharah-e-Faisal.

The station is a stop for a few trains going "upcountry" and all "down country" express trains. In the past, it was a junction on the Karachi Circular Railway. The station has a booking office, train shed, tuck shop, mosque, advance reservation office, and a parking lot.

In December 2024, amid severe traffic disruptions caused by protests by a religious party, Pakistan Railways announced additional stops for all trains departing from Karachi, including a two-minute stop at Drigh Road Junction.

== Services ==
Preceding station	Pakistan Railways	Following station
Karachi Cantonment Terminus	Allama Iqbal Express	Kotri Junction towards Sialkot Junction
Karachi Cantonment towards Karachi City	Hazara Express	Landhi Junction towards Havelian
Karachi Cantonment towards Karachi City	Sukkur Express	Landhi Junction towards Jacobabad Junction

== Gallery ==
Exterior view

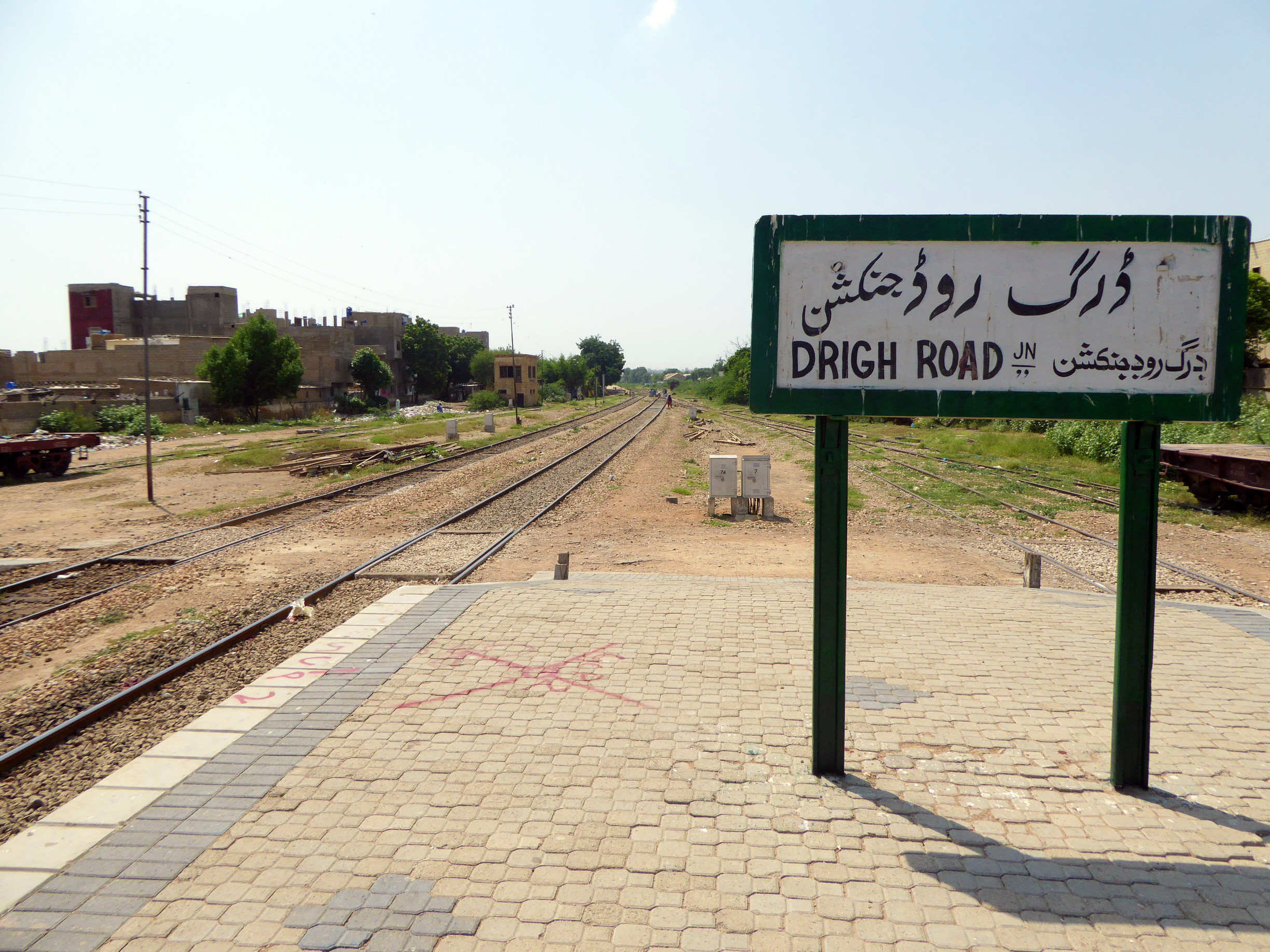
View of the platform

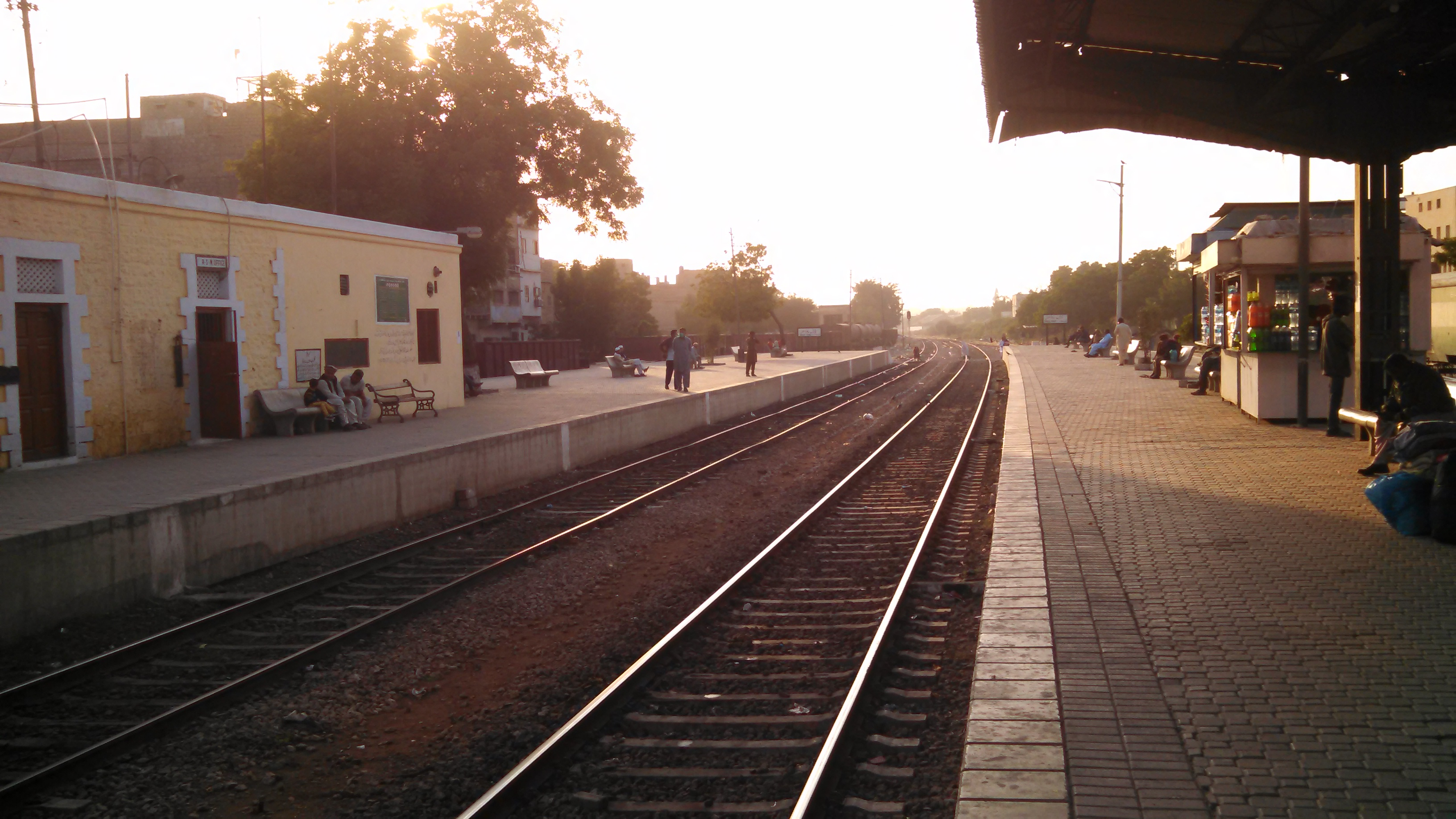
View of the tracks

== See also ==
- List of railway stations in Pakistan
- Pakistan Railways
- Karachi Circular Railway
