= Manghopir railway station =

Railway station in Karachi, Pakistan

Manghopir Station منگھو پیر اسٹیشن

General information
- Coordinates: 24.9052°N 67.0019°E
- Owner: Ministry of Railways
- Line: Karachi Circular Railway

Other information
- Station code: MGHO

Services
Preceding station	Karachi Circular Railway	Following station
Orangi Clockwise	Loop line (closed 1999, reopening proposed)	SITE Anticlockwise
Location

Manghopir railway station (Urdu: منگھو پیر ریلوے اسٹیشن, Sindhi: منگهو پير ريلوي اسٽيشن) is located in Karachi, Sindh, Pakistan.

== See also ==
- List of railway stations in Pakistan
- Pakistan Railways
