= Karachi Circular Railway =

Public transit system in Sindh, Pakistan

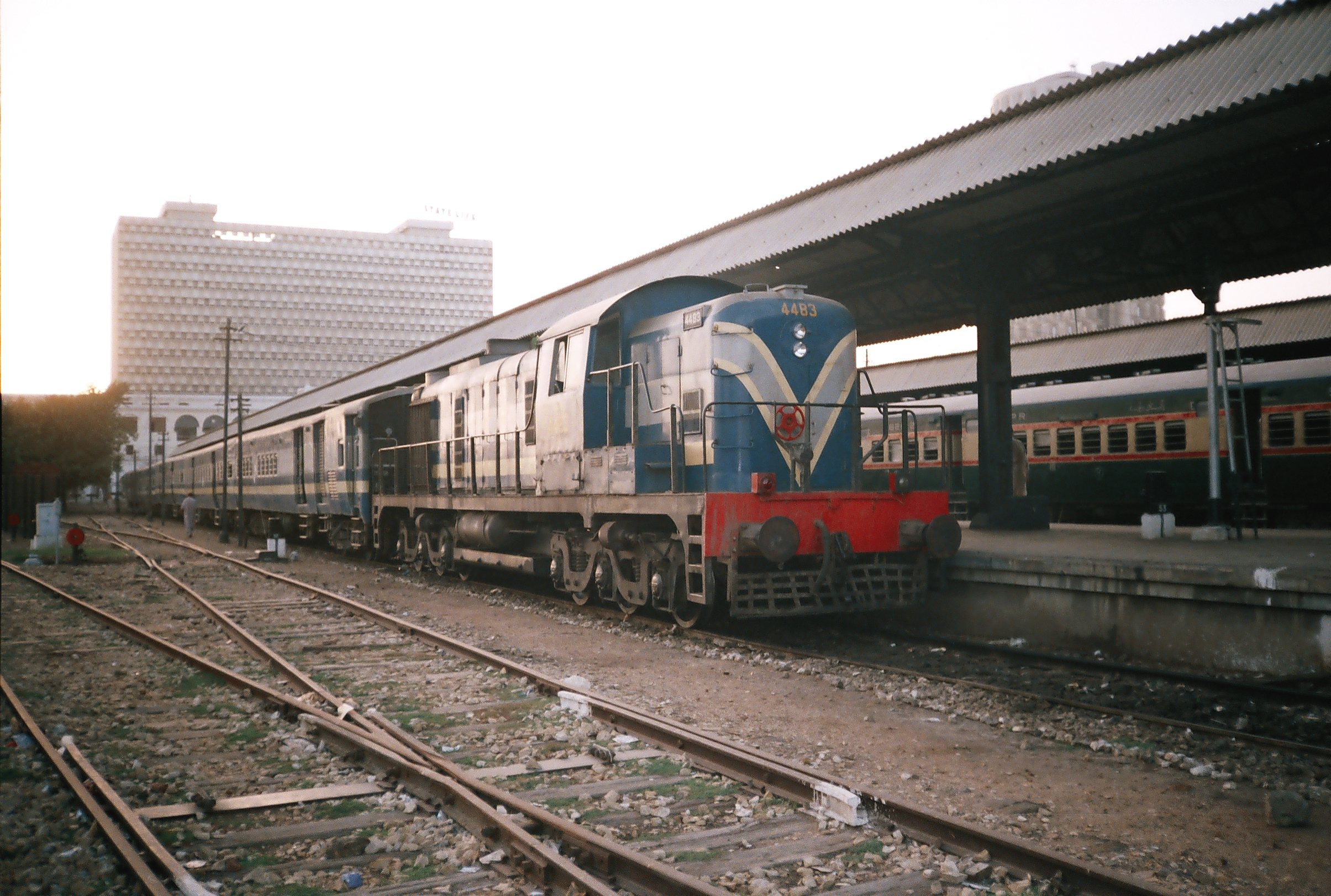

Overview
- Owner: Karachi Urban Transport Corporation
- Locale: Metropolitan Karachi
- Transit type: Commuter rail
- Number of lines: 3
- Number of stations: 24
- Headquarters: Karachi, Sindh, Pakistan

Operation
- Began operation: 1964; 62 years ago
- Infrastructure manager: Pakistan Railways

Technical
- System length: 43.24 kilometres (27 miles)
- Track gauge: 5 ft 6 in (1,676 mm)
System map
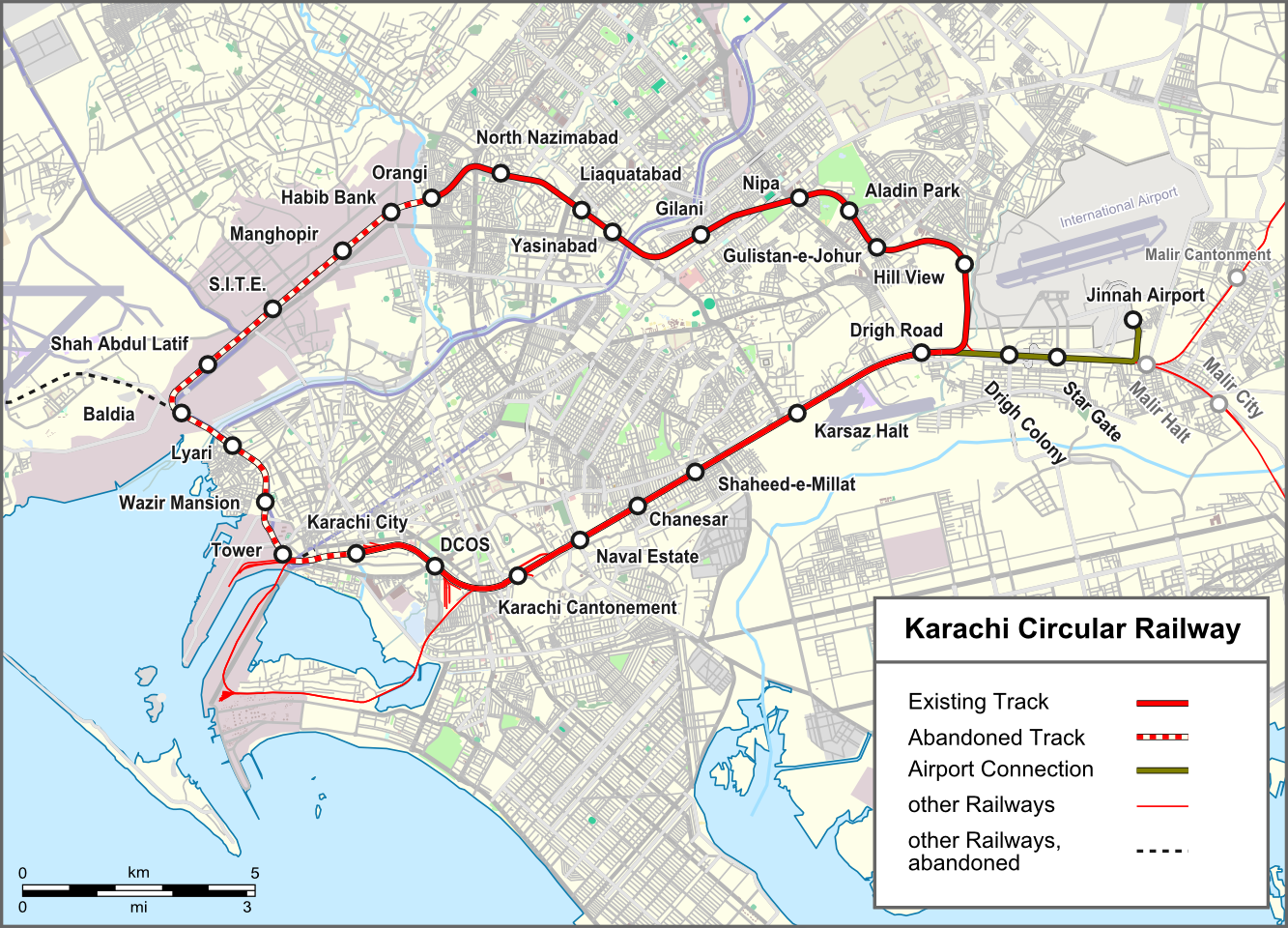

Karachi Circular Railway (abbreviated as KCR) (Urdu: کراچی سرکلر ریلوے, Sindhi: ڪراچي سرڪيولر ريلوي) is a partially active regional public transit system in Karachi, Sindh, Pakistan, which serves the Karachi metropolitan area. The KCR was fully operational between 1964 and 1994, later operating a reduced service until it was abruptly shut down in 1999. Since 2001, several restart attempts were attempted and in November 2020, the KCR partially revived operations on the orders of the Supreme Court of Pakistan.

With its hub at Karachi City station on I. I. Chundrigar Road, The KCR's revived operations would extend north to Gadap, east to Dhabeji, south to Kiamari and west to Hub in Balochistan. The revived KCR operation is intended to become an inter-regional public transit system in Karachi, with an aim to connect the city centre with several industrial and commercial districts within the city and the outlying localities.

Revival efforts for the KCR had been proposed multiple times since it became defunct in 1999, but remained unfulfilled mainly due to a lack of financial and political backing. In May 2017, the federal government approved a Rs. 27.9 billion (US$100 million) restoration package for the KCR, however delays and disputes with the Sindh provincial government ultimately led to the cancellation of the funding.

Locals have constantly fought for the revival of the KCR. Due to pressure both from outside and within government circles, a plan for its rehabilitation, financing, and implementation has been developed. In August 2020, the federal government approved a Rs. 10.5 billion (US$38 million) rehabilitation package for the KCR restoration. The funding is slated to cover only phase one and phase two of KCR's restoration project, similar to the restoration of the Karachi–Peshawar Line, according to the project director.

== History ==
Karachi Circular Railway came into being during President Ayub Khan's tenure, who suggested the use of trains as a means for short travel in Karachi. KCR Operations began in 1964 under the administration of Pakistan Railways, with the aims to provide better transportation facilities to Karachi's growing population and outlying surrounding suburban communities. The original KCR line extended from Karachi City station and ended at Drigh Road station and carried 6 million passengers that year. Its instant success made Pakistan Railways a significant profit in its first year of operation. In 1970, KCR was expanded further east to Landhi Junction station while new track was extended westwards, thus opening Karachi Port Trust Halt station and Wazir Mansion station in 1970. Throughout the 1970s, track was further extended westwards and northwards towards North Nazimabad, forming a "loop line" which circled around several of Karachi's residential and industrial areas. At its peak, KCR ran 104 daily trains, of which 80 trains ran on the main line, while the remaining 24 trains ran on the loop line. During the 1990s, cost of operations increased while revenues dropped due to a deteriorating commuter service and increasing culture of fare dodging. Private transporters during this time also contracted KCR staff and by 1994 KCR was in incurring major losses due to mismanagement. As a result, the vast majority of trains were discontinued with only a few running on the loop. Unable to withstand the pressures of a growing transport mafia, Pakistan Railways abandoned the KCR in 1999.

The official reason for the discontinuation was that Pakistan Railways was said to be making a loss by running the trains all over the city with few passengers taking advantage of the facility. Another version suggests that private transporters conspired with some corrupt staffers in the railways to fulfill their desire to bag the bulk of passengers for themselves The result caused instant gridlock on Karachi's streets. Severe criticisms were lodged at Pakistan Railways mismanagement as well as Karachi's "road transport mafia". In 2005, revival plans for the KCR were initiated to fulfill the growing transportation needs of Karachi, but never fully materialized. In 2009, the Karachi Urban Transport Corporation was proposed in which KCR would be operated as a semi-autonomous body. Pakistan Railways would have 60% share in the corporation, Sindh government 25% and Karachi 15%.

== Route ==
The KCR will consist of a loop line from Karachi City to Drigh Road via Liaquatabad. 44 kilometres (27.3 miles) will be revived with an additional 6 kilometre elevated dual track from Karachi City to Jinnah International Airport, allowing the KCR to connect to the Pakistan Railway main line. Existing railway tracks and 30 stations would be completely rebuilt on bridges. KCR would be used by 500,000 passengers/day which would increase to 1 million in later years. KCR will have 250 modern driverless electric bullet trains which would run 17-hours a day & 7-days a week. This project is also part of CPEC. Total cost of the project would be 294 billion PKR. The KCR would be run by the Sindh Government through Karachi Urban Transport Corporation (KUTC). Construction started in 2022 by FWO and would complete by 2025.

== Lines ==
=== Main line ===
Operational

- Karachi City
- Karachi Cantonment
- Chanesar Halt (Abandoned)
- Karsaz (Abandoned)
- Drigh Road > Loop line
- Drigh Colony
- Airport Halt
- Malir > Malir line
- Landhi Junction
- Jummah Goth
- Bin Qasim Port
- Gaddar
- Dabheji

=== Loop line ===
Closed

- Depot Hill
- Karachi University
- Urdu College
- Gilani
- Liaqatabad
- Orangi (Formerly known as North Nazimabad)
- Manghopir
- SITE
- Shah Abdul Latif
- Baldia
- Lyari
- Wazir Mansion
- Karachi Port Trust (Abandoned)

=== Malir line ===
- Malir Colony
- Malir Cantonment

== Encroachments ==
Around 7,650 structures—including 4,653 houses—have been erected illegally on land allocated to the KCR, occupying 67 of the 145 hectares of land required.

== Revival timeline ==
A large amount of criticism has been lodged at supposed "revival efforts" of the KCR. Countless studies and feasibility reports since 2001 has yielded no actual ground work. Several proposals were publicly announced by politicians both in the Government of Sindh and Government of Pakistan, all of which had approved plans and pledged funding. Yet each date passed by without any work commencing. The following is a timeline of statements made by several politicians over the past 15 years, all of whom boldly gave start dates for the KCR project:

- 24 March 2003: Minister of Railways Ghos Bakhsh Khan Mahar stated that the revival of the KCR had been planned for which feasibility studies and tenders would be floated and awarded to the lowest bidder, adding that the KCR would be operated in the private sector. Nothing materialized after this announcement.
- 9 March 2005: Prime Minister Shaukat Aziz inaugurated the first phase of the KCR and claimed the project would be revived in three phases "within a couple of years or so". Rs. 3.5 billion (US$13 million) was pledged to be spent on the complete renovation of the KCR, however within the year the first phase was shut down.
- 30 April 2010: Minister of Railways Ghulam Ahmad Bilour stated construction work would begin in 2010. Stage I and II of the project would commence simultaneously and be completed within three-years and would be open to the public by 2014. This date passed without any work commencing.
- 9 April 2012: Karachi Urban Transport Corporation Managing Director, Aijaz Hussain Khilji, stated construction work would begin in June 2013 and hoped it would be completed by June 2017. This date passed without any work commencing.
- 8 August 2012: Karachi Metropolitan Corporation Administrator, Muhammad Hussain Syed, stated the study report for restoration of the KCR had been completed and that construction would begin by September 2013. JICA agreed to a Rs. 260 billion (US$930 million) loan to the Karachi Urban Transport Corporation, which would oversee rebuilding and refurbishment of the KCR. The plans called for upgrades and rebuilding of the 50 kilometer long circular loop line which would operate 24 trains facilitating 700,000 commuters, making 3-minute stops at 23 stations. However, this plan never materialized.
- 9 December 2016: Minister of Railways Khawaja Saad Rafique announced that Pakistan Railways would handover administrative control to the Government of Sindh, but would require KCR property land being allotted for other purposes to be cleared first. Nothing materialized after this announcement. Nothing materialized after this announcement.
- 30 September 2017: Chief Minister of Sindh, Syed Murad Ali Shah claimed the KCR project would begin on 25 December 2017 after he stated that the KCR route had been cleared of all encroachments and Pakistan Railways was on board for acquiring 360 acres of land for the KCR right of way. This date passed without any work commencing.
- 18 January 2018: Chief Minister of Sindh, Syed Murad Ali Shah backtracked on his initial statement and said that work on the KCR project will begin on 23 March 2018. He stated “I am going to give good news to the people of Karachi who need KCR in March”. This date passed without any work commencing.
- 1 March 2020: Minister of Railways Sheikh Rasheed Ahmed said that the Karachi Circular Railway "will be operationalized in six months" in collaboration with the Government of Sindh. This date passed without any work commencing.
- 20 August 2020: KCR was allocated Rs. 150 billion (US$540 million) of the federal budget of fiscal year 2020–21, while the Sindh provincial budget allocated Rs. 207 billion (US$740 million).
- 19 November 2020: Minister of Railways Sheikh Rashid inaugurated the KCR by traveling from Orangi Station to Pipri Yard. The 14 kilometres track runs through six stations and 12 level crossings.
- 11 February 2021: KCR was further extended to 74-kilometres. With the new extension, the service will connect Dhabeji station to Orangi Town station.
- 28 September 2021: Prime Minister Imran Khan inaugurated the Rs. 207 billion (US$740 million) Karachi Circular Railway Revival Project, which is anticipated to be completed in three years.
- 28 May 2022: KCR was included into the China-Pakistan Economic Corridor project by Shehbaz Sharif. The existing 43 km KCR track and stations would be completely rebuilt into a “world class mass transit system with environment friendly, driverless and electric trains” within three years and expected to open in 2025. Many underpasses and bridges would be built along the route to eliminate the 22-level crossings. The KCR would be modelled after Lahore Metro’s Orange Line and would have been integrated into the Karachi Metrobus system. As of 2025, no work on this project has commenced.

== See also ==
- Karachi Tramway
- Peshawar Circular Railway
- Lahore Metro
- Pakistan Railways
- Transport in Pakistan
