= Depot Hill railway station =

Railway station in Karachi, Pakistan

Depot Hill Station ڈپو ہل اسٹیشن

General information
- Coordinates: 24.8948°N 67.1365°E
- Owner: Ministry of Railways
- Line: Karachi Circular Railway

Other information
- Station code: DPHL

Services
Preceding station	Karachi Circular Railway	Following station
Drigh Road Junction Terminus	Loop line	Karachi University towards Orangi
Location

Depot Hill railway station (Urdu: ڈپو ہل ریلوے اسٹیشن, Sindhi: ڊيپو هل ريلوي اسٽيشن) is located in Pakistan, about four kilometres away from Karachi Jinnah International Airport. Although Depot Hill is located just off Pakistan Railway Main Line-1, it is a commuter station and thus no express trains serve it.

== See also ==
- List of railway stations in Pakistan
- Pakistan Railways
