= Chanesar Halt railway station =

Railway station in Pakistan

Chanesar Halt Station چینیسر اسٹیشن
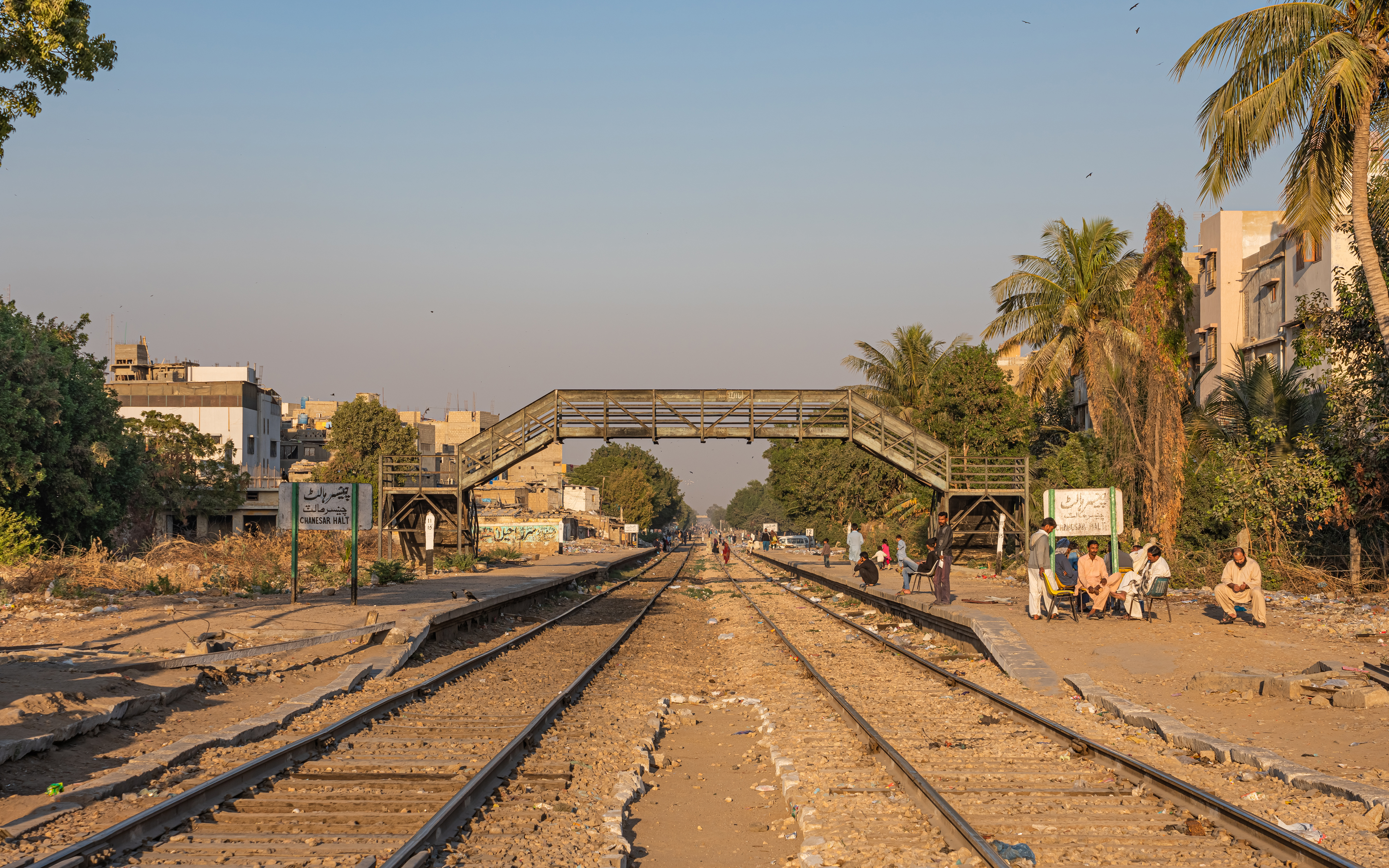

General information
- Coordinates: 24.8573°N 67.0671°E
- Owner: Ministry of Railways
- Line: Karachi–Peshawar Line

Other information
- Station code: CHNS

Services
Preceding station	Karachi Circular Railway	Following station
Karachi Cantonment towards Karachi City	Main line	Karsaz towards Dabheji
Location

Chanesar Halt railway station (Urdu: چینیسر ریلوے اسٹیشن, Sindhi: چنيسر ريلوي اسٽيشن) is an abandoned train station in the Chanesar Town (formerly Chanesar Goth) neighborhood in Karachi, Pakistan. It was a part of the Karachi Circular Railway.

The rail line near Chanesar Halt is encroached by houses, preventing further development of the rail line.

Some people who live near Chanesar Halt in Mahmudabad speak a language similar to Vaghri.

== See also ==
- List of railway stations in Pakistan
- Pakistan Railways
