= Malir railway station =

Railway station in Sindh, Pakistan

Malir Railway Station ملیر ریلوے اسٹیشن
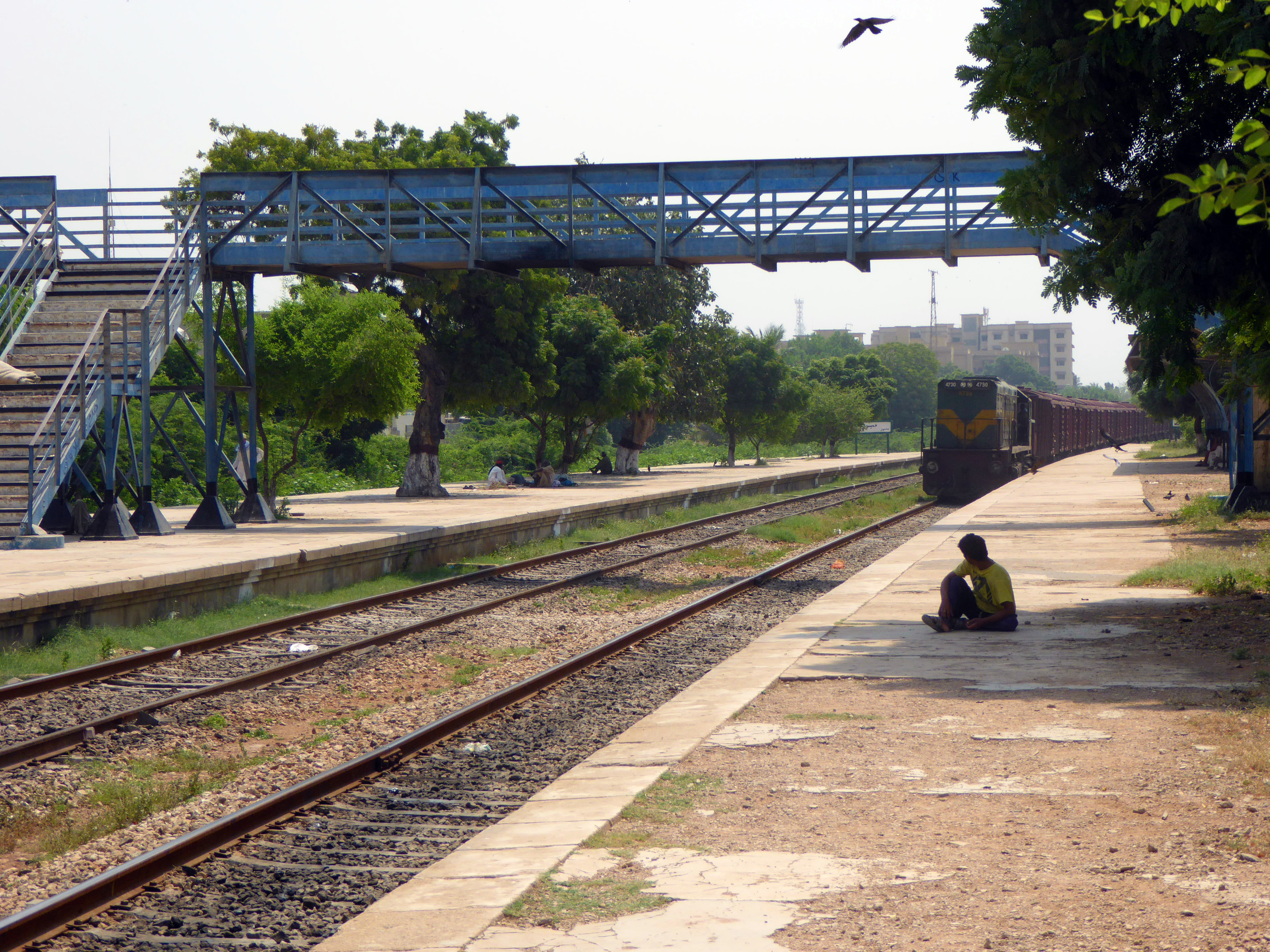

General information
- Coordinates: 24.8839°N 67.1763°E
- Owner: Ministry of Railways
- Lines: Karachi–Peshawar Railway Line; Karachi Circular Railway
- Platforms: 4
- Tracks: 4

Construction
- Platform levels: 1

Other information
- Station code: MXB

Services
Preceding station	Pakistan Railways	Following station
Drigh Colony towards Kiamari	Karachi–Peshawar Line	Landhi Junction towards Peshawar Cantonment
Preceding station	Karachi Circular Railway	Following station
Airport Halt towards Karachi City	Main line	Landhi Junction towards Dabheji
Terminus	Malir line	Malir Colony towards Malir Cantonment
Location

Malir Railway Station (Urdu: ملیر ریلوے اسٹیشن, Sindhi: ملير ريلوي اسٽيشن) is located in Malir 15, Karachi, Pakistan.

== Gallery ==
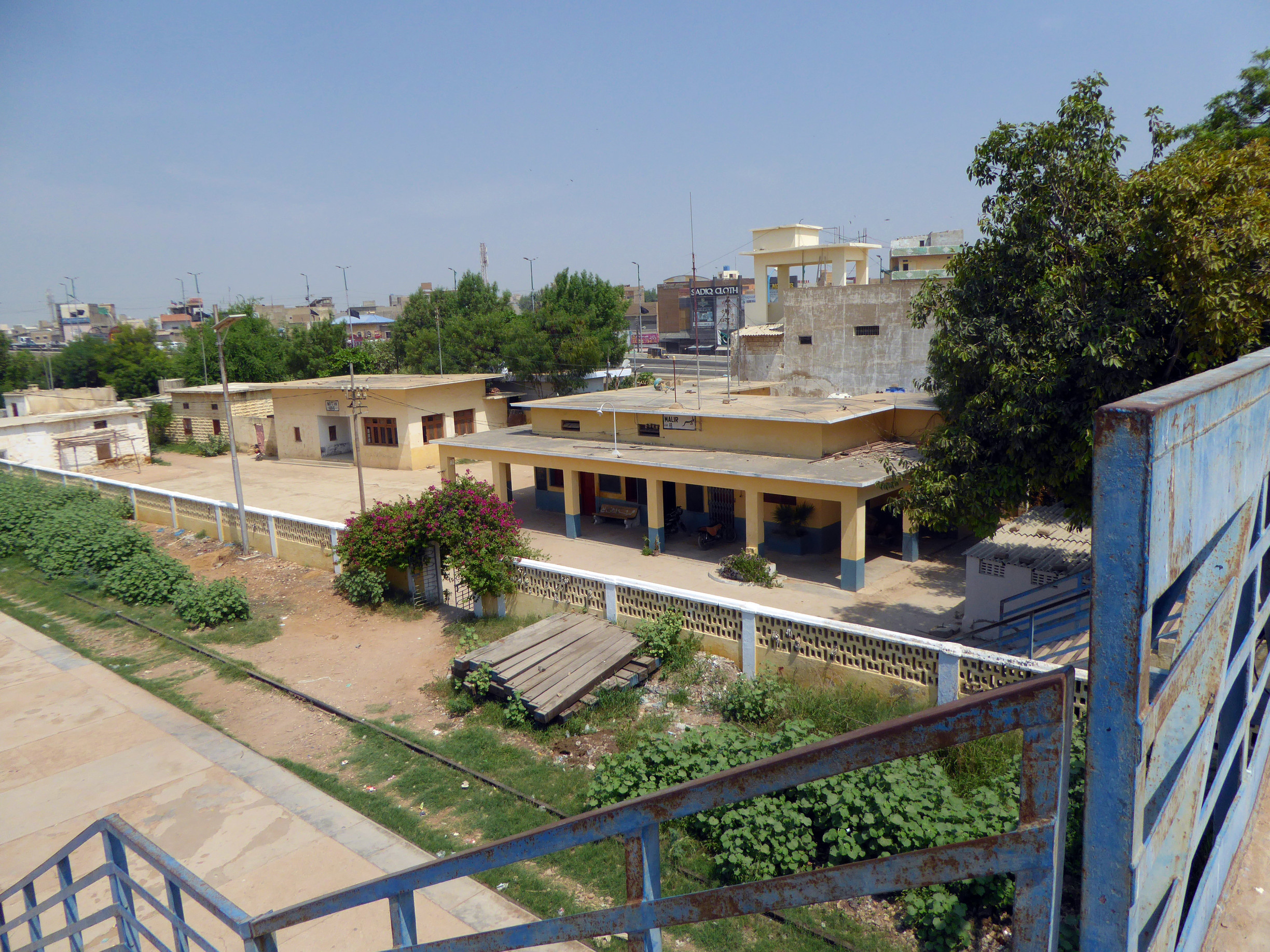
Malir railway station main building

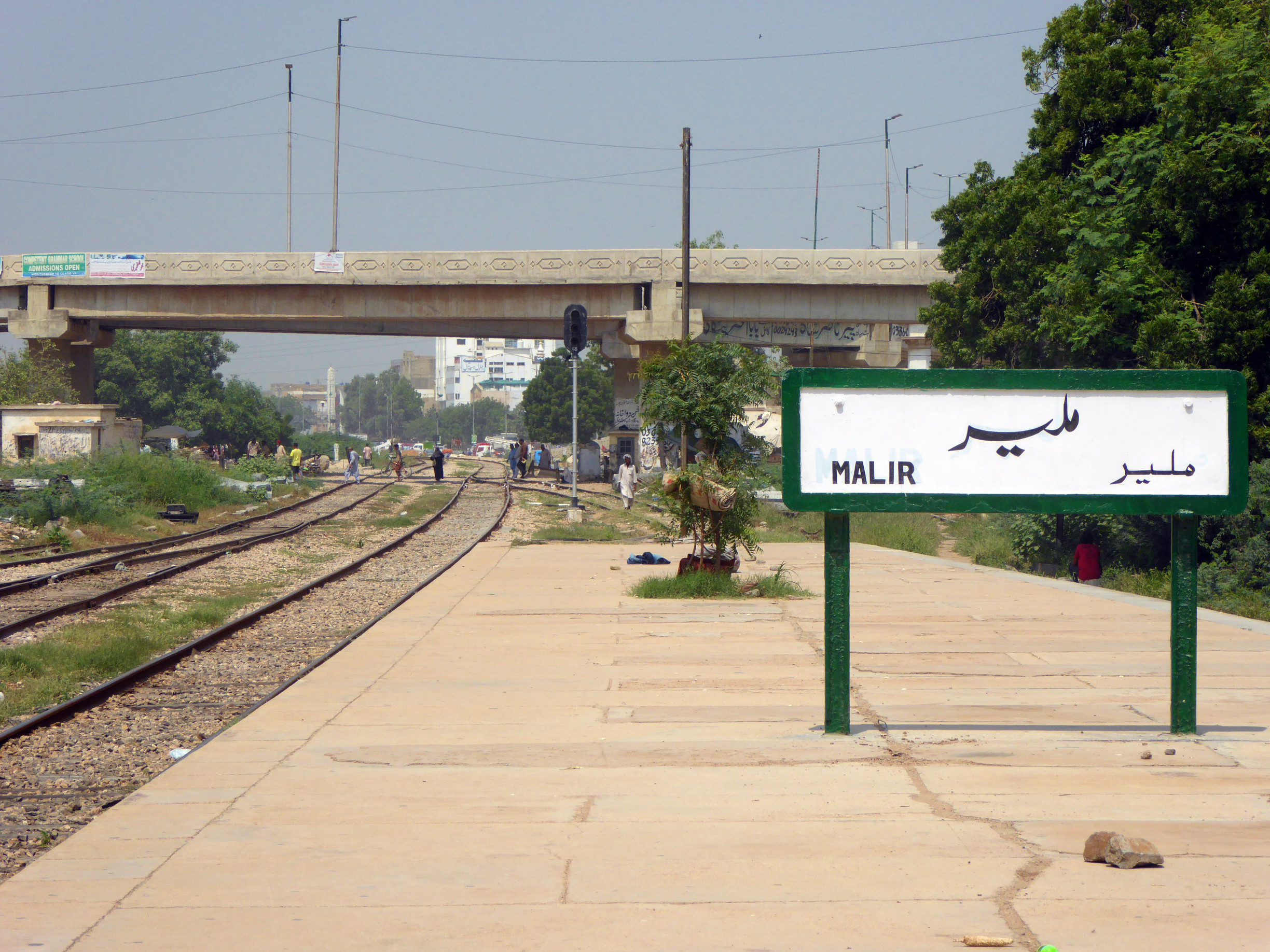
A view of Malir railway station

== See also ==
- Malir Cantonment railway station
- Malir Colony railway station
- List of railway stations in Pakistan
- Pakistan Railways
