= Bin Qasim railway station =

Railway station in Pakistan

Bin Qasim Railway Station بن قاسم ریلوے اسٹیشن

General information
- Coordinates: 24.8446°N 67.3394°E
- Owner: Ministry of Railways
- Lines: Karachi–Peshawar Railway Line; Karachi Circular Railway

Other information
- Station code: BQM

Services
Preceding station	Pakistan Railways	Following station
Jummah Goth towards Kiamari	Karachi–Peshawar Line	Badal Nala towards Peshawar Cantonment
Preceding station	Karachi Circular Railway	Following station
Jummah Goth towards Karachi City	Main line	Gaddar towards Dabheji
Location

Bin Qasim Railway Station (Urdu: بن قاسم ریلوے اسٹیشن, Sindhi: بن قاسم ريلوي اسٽيشن) is located in Bin Qasim Town, Karachi, Pakistan.

== See also ==
- List of railway stations in Pakistan
- Pakistan Railways
