= Badal Nala railway station =

Railway station in Karachi, Pakistan

Badal Nala Railway Station بادل نالا ریلوے اسٹیشن

General information
- Coordinates: 24°50′42″N 67°22′02″E
- Owner: Ministry of Railways
- Line: Karachi–Peshawar Railway Line

Other information
- Station code: BDNL

Services
Preceding station	Pakistan Railways	Following station
Bin Qasim towards Kiamari	Karachi–Peshawar Line	Gaddar towards Peshawar Cantonment
Location

Badal Nala Railway Station (Urdu: بادل نالا ریلوے اسٹیشن, Sindhi: بادل نالو ريلوي اسٽيشن) is located in Karachi, Pakistan.

== See also ==
- List of railway stations in Pakistan
- Pakistan Railways
