= Gillani railway station =

Abandoned railway station in Karachi, Pakistan

Coordinates: 24.9088°N 67.07841°E

Gillani Station گیلانی اسٹیشن
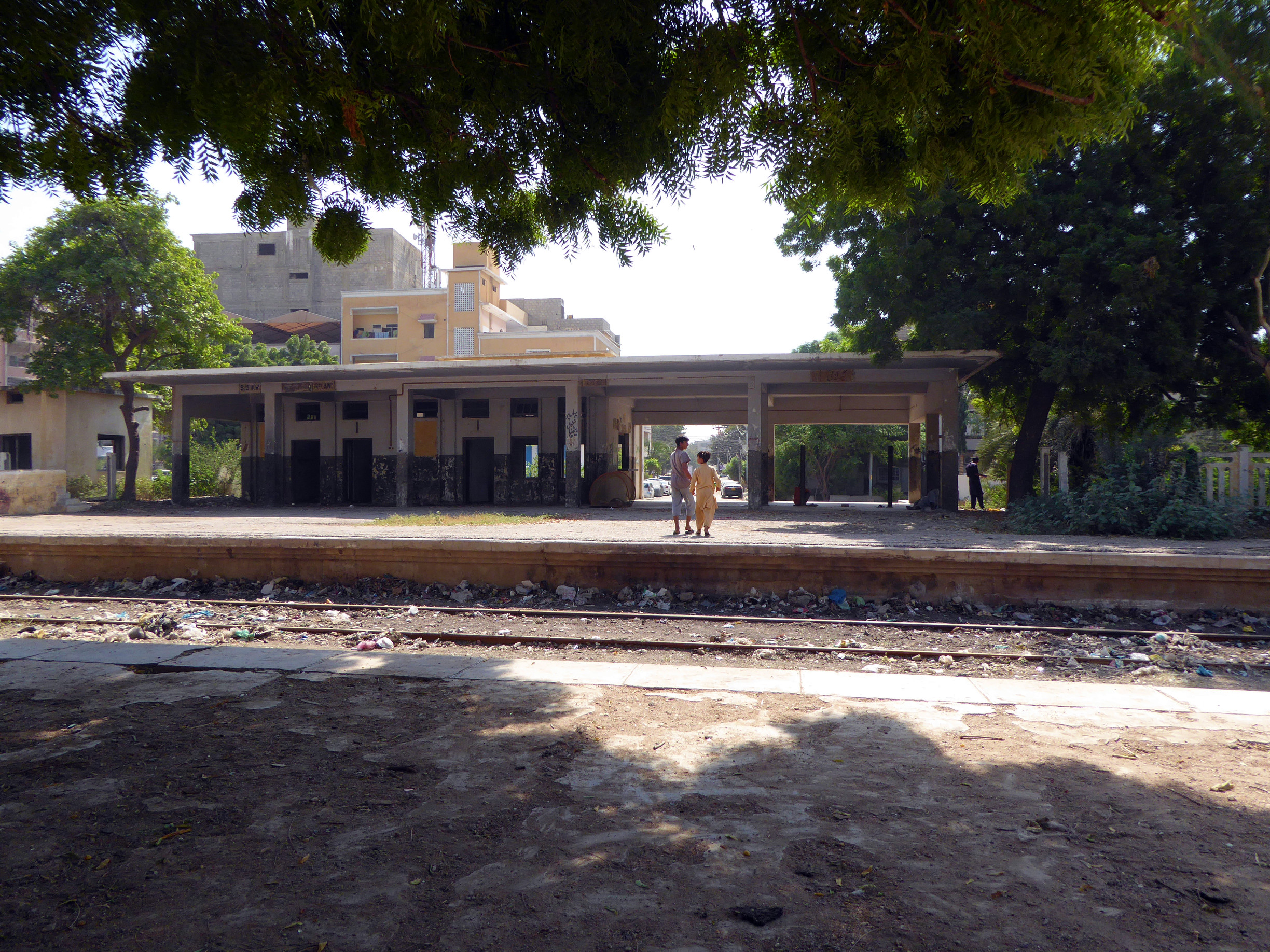

General information
- Owner: Ministry of Railways
- Line: Karachi Circular Railway
- Platforms: 3
- Tracks: 3

Other information
- Station code: GLAN

History
- Opened: 1970

Services
Preceding station	Karachi Circular Railway	Following station
Urdu College Clockwise	Loop line (closed 1999, reopening proposed)	Liaqatabad Anticlockwise
Location

Gillani Railway Station (Urdu: گیلانی ریلوے اسٹیشن, Sindhi: گيلاني ريلوي اسٽيشن) is an abandoned railway station on Karachi Circular Railway (KCR) loop line in Gulshan-e-Iqbal, Karachi, Pakistan. In the past, Pakistan Railways had a plan to establish a central railway station for Karachi there. For a while it was the terminus station of Tezrao and a stop for the Chenab Express when it ran via the KCR loop for a few years in the 1990s.

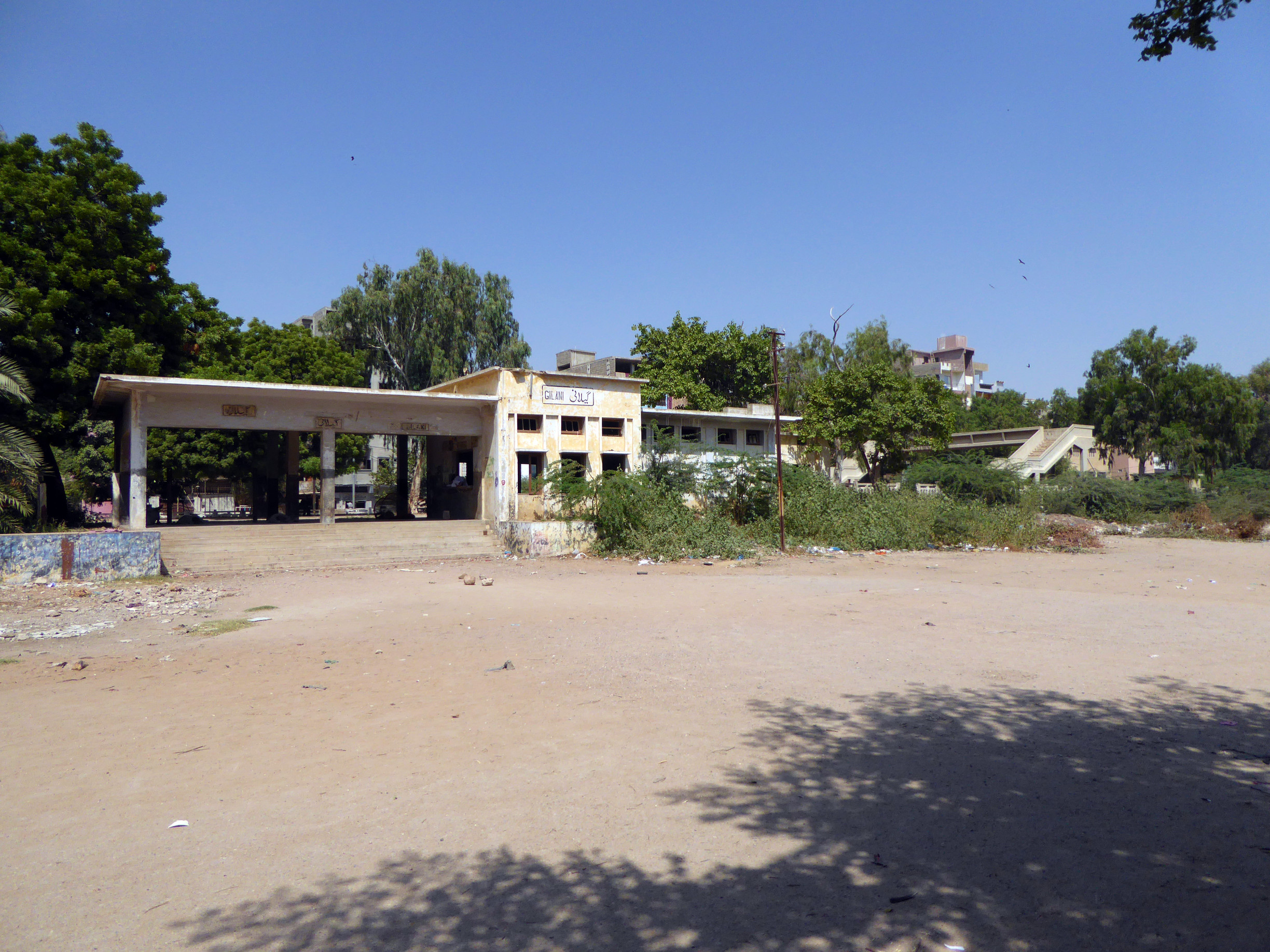
Gilani Railway Station, view from outside

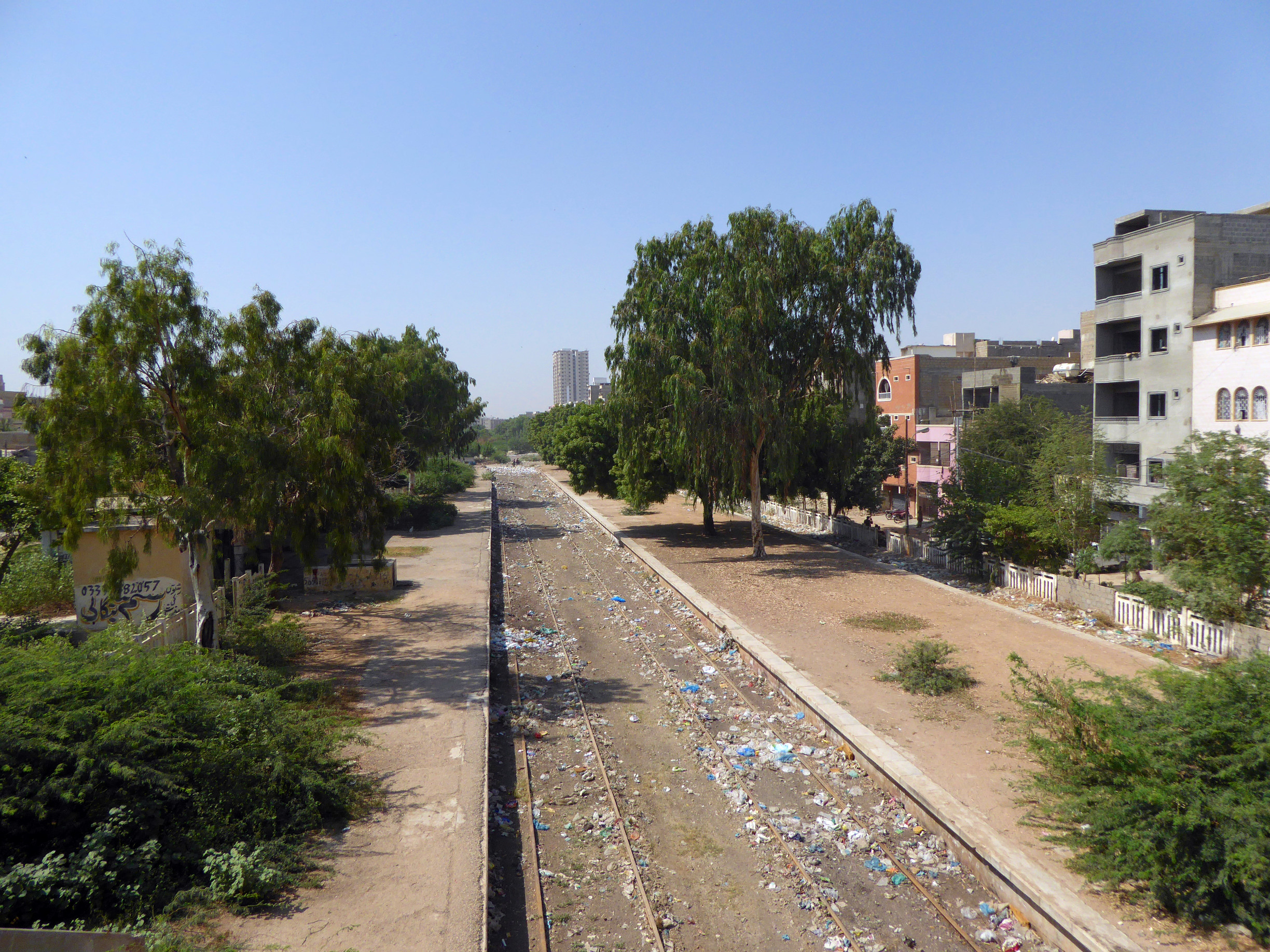
Gilani Railway Station, view towards Liaquatabad from pedestrian bridge

== Possible re-opening ==
The station might re-open if a planned re-opening of the KCR loop as a rapid transit scheme goes ahead.

== See also ==
- List of railway stations in Pakistan
- Pakistan Railways
