= Tezrao =

Pakistani passenger train

Tezrao Express
Overview
- Service type: Inter-city rail
- First service: 1972
- Last service: 2010
- Current operator(s): Pakistan Railways

Route
- Termini: Karachi Cantonment; Peshawar Cantonment
- Stops: 32
- Distance travelled: 1,764 kilometres (1,096 mi)
- Average journey time: 32 hours, 00 minutes
- Service frequency: Daily
- Train number(s): 5UP (Karachi→Peshawar); 6DN (Peshawar→Karachi)

On-board services
- Class(es): AC Business; AC Sleeper; Economy
- Sleeping arrangements: Available
- Catering facilities: Available

Technical
- Track gauge: 1,676 mm (5 ft 6 in)
- Operating speed: 55 km/h (34 mph)
- Track owner(s): Pakistan Railways
Route map
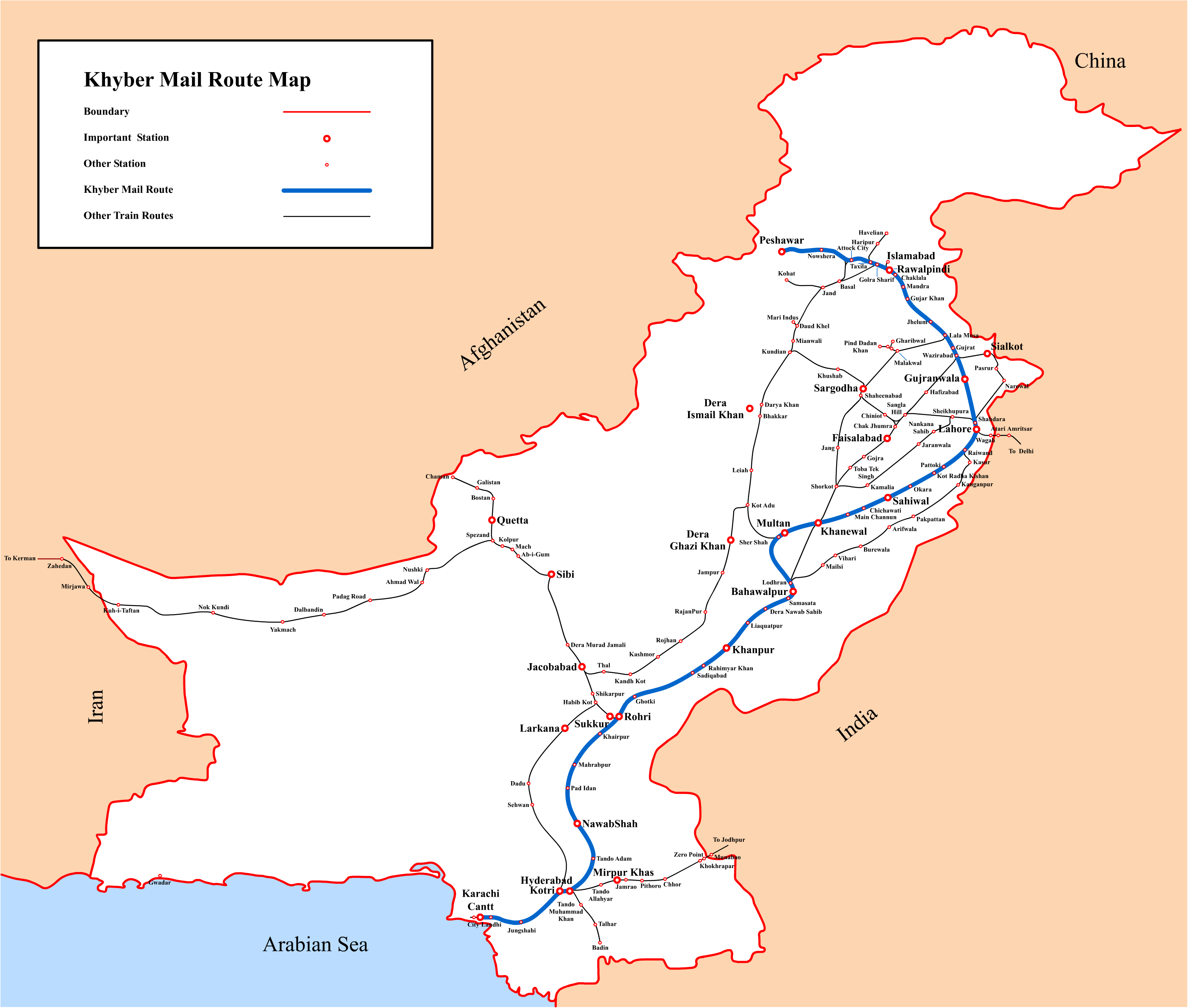
- Khyber Mail route map

Tezrao (also spelled Tezro) (Urdu: تیزرو) was a daily express train (5-Up/6-Down) service in Pakistan. The train ran between Karachi and Peshawar. Its name was changed to Zulfiqar Express during the Peoples Party government. After the Peoples Party government its name changed again to Tezrao. The train had economy and first-class sleeper accommodation. In 2008, its route was changed to Mardan to Karachi by the then railway minister Ghulam Ahmed Bilour .It was suspended on 20 July 2010 due to lack of locomotives.

== Route ==
Karachi to Peshawar via Hyderabad, Rohri, Khanewal, Lahore and Rawalpindi

== Station stops ==
- Karachi Cantonment
- Landhi
- Kotri Junction
- Hyderabad Junction
- Nawabshah
- Bhiria Road
- Khairpur
- Rohri Junction
- Pano Akil
- Sadiqabad
- Rahim Yar Khan
- Khanpur Junction
- Samasata Junction
- Bahawalpur
- Lodhran Junction
- Shujabad
- Multan Cantonment
- Khanewal Junction
- Sahiwal
- Okara Cantonment
- Raiwind Junction
- Lahore Cantonment
- Lahore Junction
- Gujranwala
- Wazirabad Junction
- Gujrat
- Lala Musa Junction
- Jhelum
- Rawalpindi
- Taxila Cantonment
- Attock City Junction
- Nowshera Junction
- Peshawar Cantonment
