= Karsaz Halt railway station =

Railway station in Pakistan

Karsaz Station کارساز اسٹیشن

General information
- Owner: Ministry of Railways
- Line: Karachi Circular Railway

Other information
- Station code: KRSZ

Services
| Preceding station | Karachi Circular Railway | Following station |
|---|---|---|
| Chanesar towards Karachi City | Main line | Drigh Road Junction towards Dabheji |
Location

Karsaz Halt railway station (Urdu: کارساز ریلوے اسٹیشن, Sindhi: ڪارساز ريلوي اسٽيشن) is located in Karachi, Pakistan.

== See also ==
- List of railway stations in Pakistan
- Pakistan Railways
