= Karachi Urban Transport Corporation =

Karachi Urban Transport Corporation کراچی شهری حمل و نقل شرکت
Agency overview
- Formed: 2008
- Jurisdiction: Metropolitan Karachi area
- Headquarters: Karachi, Sindh, Pakistan
- Child agencies: Karachi Circular Railway; Karachi Metrobus
- Website: https://kutc.pk/

Karachi Urban Transport Corporation (KUTC) (Urdu: کراچی شهری حمل و نقل شرکت) is a municipal agency responsible for planning and integrating road transport and public transport in the Metropolitan Karachi area. It has assumed other key initiatives including the construction of the Karachi Circular Railway and Karachi BRT as well as multiple other projects supporting public transport in the city.

== History ==
KUTC was registered on 8 May 2008 in Securities & Exchange Commission of Pakistan (SECP) as Public Limited Company. Pakistan Railways 60%, Government of Sindh 25% and City District Government Karachi has 15% share in this corporation.
