= Shah Abdul Latif railway station =

Railway station in Karachi, Pakistan

Shah Abdul Latif Station شاہ عبدالطیف اسٹیشن

General information
- Coordinates: 24.8838°N 66.9735°E
- Owner: Ministry of Railways
- Line: Karachi Circular Railway

Other information
- Station code: SDLF

History
- Opened: 1984

Services
Preceding station	Karachi Circular Railway	Following station
SITE Clockwise	Loop line (closed 1999, reopening proposed)	Baldia Anticlockwise
Location

Shah Abdul Latif railway station (Urdu: شاہ عبدالطیف ریلوے اسٹیشن, Sindhi: شاه عبداللطيف ريلوي اسٽيشن) is located in Karachi, Pakistan. Shah Abdul Latif railway station was established in 1984. It is located in the SITE area of Karachi, Pakistan, and is named after the famous Sindhi poet Shah Abdul Latif Bhittai. The station was built as part of the Karachi Circular Railway (KCR) project, which was launched in the 1964 to provide a fast and efficient public transportation system for the city. The KCR is a loop line that connects different parts of Karachi, and Shah Abdul Latif station is one of its major stops.

The station is used by thousands of commuters every day. It is also a popular spot for tourists, as it is located near the SITE industrial area, which is home to many major companies and factories. In recent years, the Shah Abdul Latif railway station has been undergoing a major renovation. The station has been modernized and upgraded with new facilities, such as escalators, elevators, and air conditioning.

The renovation is expected to be completed in 2024, and once it is, the Shah Abdul Latif railway station will be one of the most modern and efficient railway stations in Pakistan.

== See also ==
- List of railway stations in Pakistan
- Pakistan Railways
