= Wazir Mansion railway station =

Railway station in Karachi, Pakistan

Wazir Mansion Station وزیر مینشن اسٹیشن

General information
- Location: Mauripur Road, Karachi
- Coordinates: 24.8568°N 66.9868°E
- Owner: Ministry of Railways
- Line: Karachi Circular Railway

Other information
- Station code: WZN

Services
Preceding station	Karachi Circular Railway	Following station
Layari Clockwise	Loop line (closed 1999, reopening proposed)	Karachi Port Trust Halt Anticlockwise
Location

Wazir Mansion railway station (Urdu: وزیر مینشن ریلوے اسٹیشن, Sindhi: وزير مينشن ريلوي اسٽيشن) is located in Karachi, Pakistan. The station has been used for transporting coal to other parts of the country. It is named for the nearby Wazir Mansion - birthplace of Pakistan's founder, Muhammad Ali Jinnah.

== History ==
The exact date of establishment of Wazir Mansion railway station is unknown, but it is thought to have been built in the early 1900s. Some sources claim that the station was built in 1905, while others say that it was built in 1910.

== See also ==
- List of railway stations in Pakistan
- Pakistan Railways
