= Baldia railway station =

Railway station in Karachi, Pakistan

Baldia Station بلدیہ اسٹیشن

General information
- Coordinates: 24.868611°N 66.978889°E
- Owner: Ministry of Railways
- Line: Karachi Circular Railway

Other information
- Station code: BDAA

Services
Preceding station	Karachi Circular Railway	Following station
Shah Abdul Latif Clockwise	Loop line (closed 1999, reopening proposed)	Layari Anticlockwise
Location

Baldia railway station (Urdu: بلدیہ ریلوے اسٹیشن, is located in Karachi, Pakistan.

== See also ==
- List of railway stations in Pakistan
- Pakistan Railways
