= Urdu College railway station =

Railway station in Karachi, Pakistan

Urdu College Station اردو کالج اسٹیشن
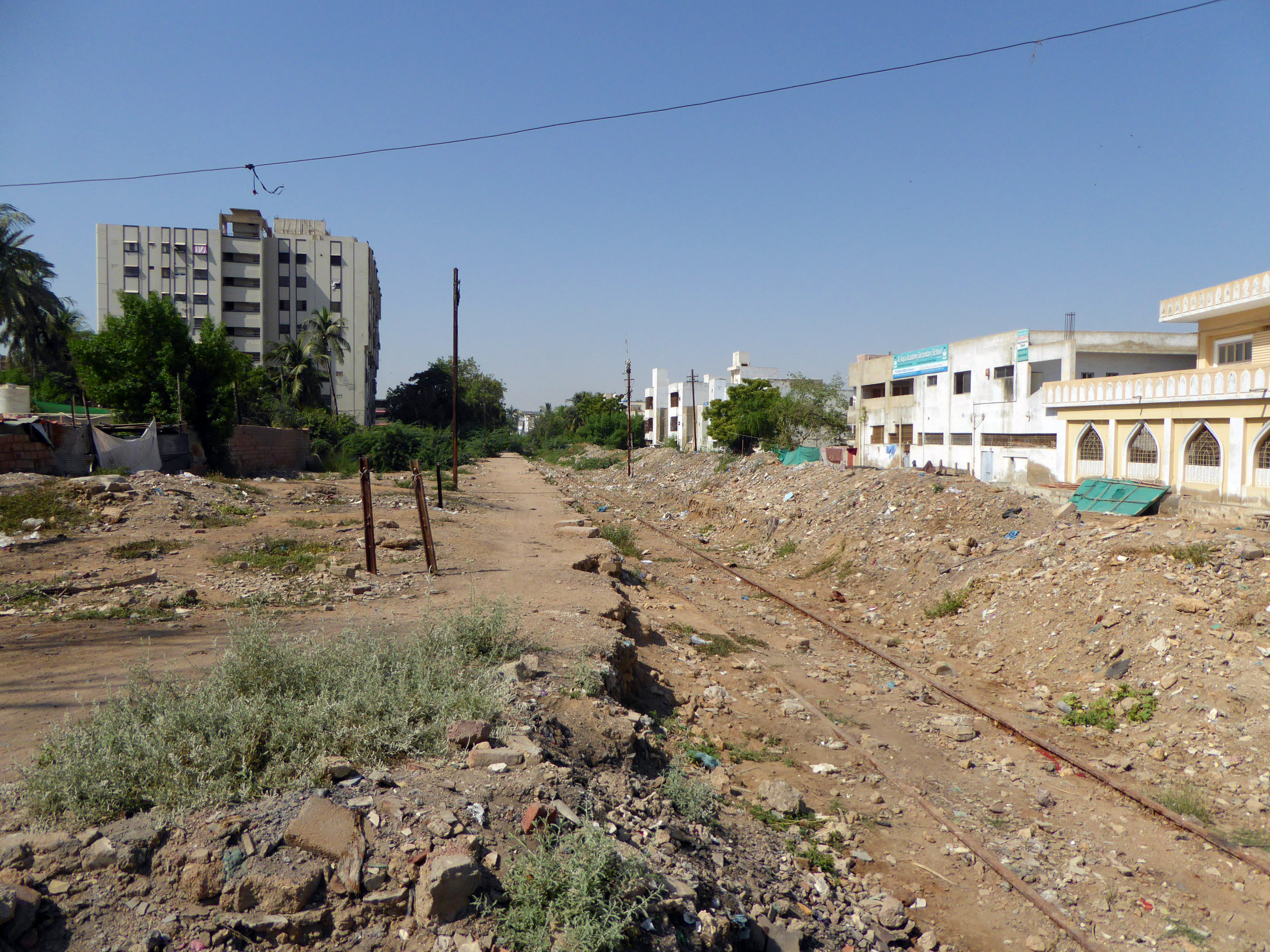
- Urdu College railway station, view towards Gilani

General information
- Coordinates: 24.9131°N 67.0869°E
- Owner: Ministry of Railways
- Line: Karachi Circular Railway
- Platforms: 1
- Tracks: 2

Other information
- Station code: URD

History
- Opened: 1984

Services
Preceding station	Karachi Circular Railway	Following station
Karachi University Clockwise	Loop line (closed 1999, reopening proposed)	Gillani Anticlockwise
Location

Urdu College railway station (Urdu: اردو کالج اسٹیشن, Sindhi: اردو کالج اسٽيشن) is an abandoned railway station on Karachi Circular Railway loop line in Gulshan-e-Iqbal, Karachi, Pakistan. Urdu College railway station was established in 1984 as part of the Karachi Circular Railway (KCR) project. The station was built to serve the growing population of Gulshan-e-Iqbal, a suburb of Karachi. However, the station has been abandoned since 2006 and is now in a state of disrepair. There are plans to revive the KCR project, and if this happens, Urdu College railway station may be reopened.

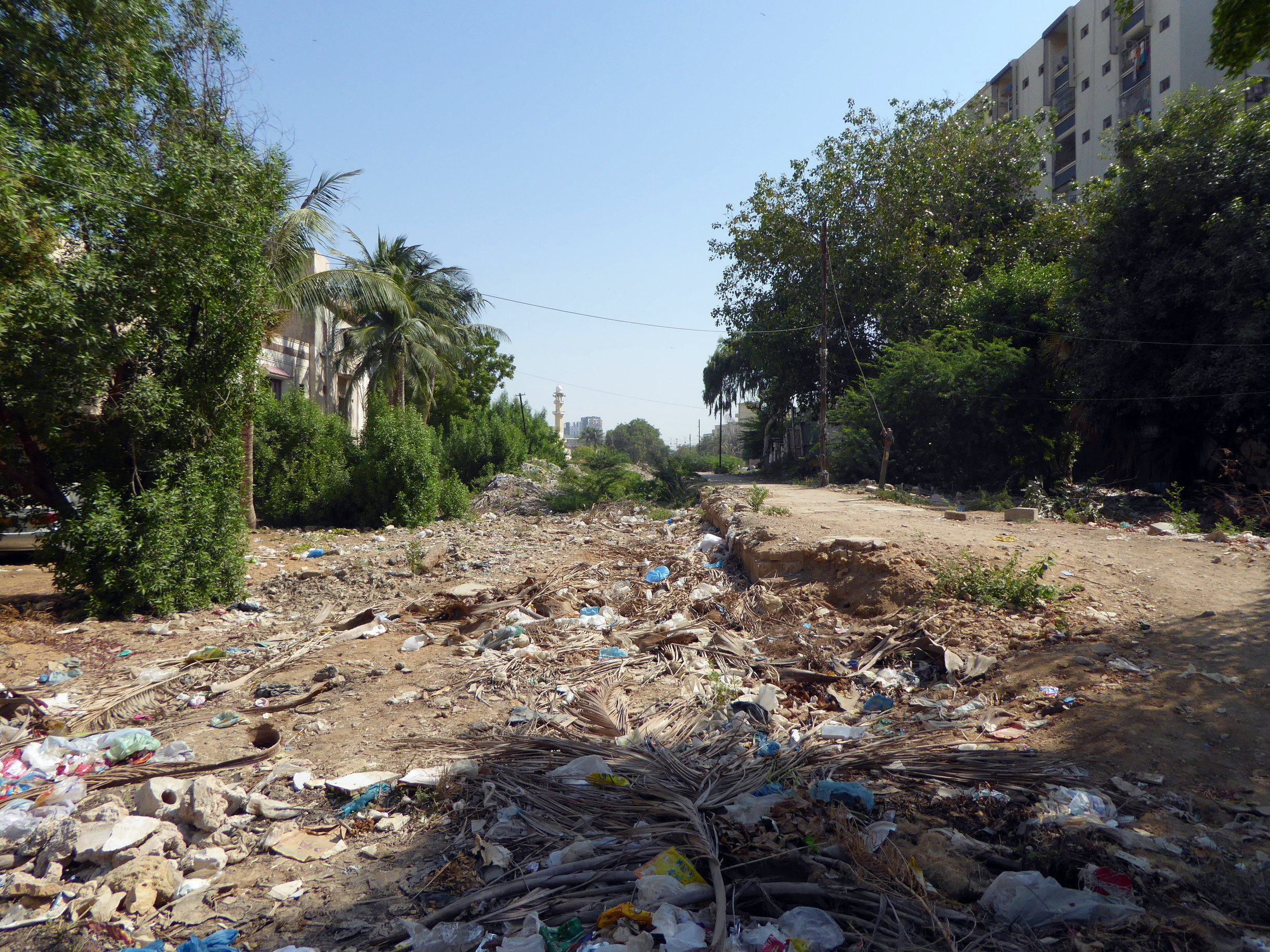
Urdu College railway station, view towards Karachi University

== See also ==
- List of railway stations in Pakistan
- Pakistan Railways
