= SITE railway station =

Railway station in Karachi, Pakistan

SITE Station سائٹ اسٹیشن

General information
- Coordinates: 24.8944°N 66.9874°E
- Owner: Ministry of Railways
- Line: Karachi Circular Railway

Other information
- Station code: SITE

History
- Opened: 2004

Services
Preceding station	Karachi Circular Railway	Following station
Manghopir Clockwise	Loop line (closed 1999, reopening proposed)	Shah Abdul Latif Anticlockwise
Location

SITE railway station (Urdu: سائٹ ریلوے اسٹیشن, Sindhi: سائيٽ ريلوي اسٽيشن) is located in Karachi, Pakistan, and serves the Sindh Industrial Trading Estate (SITE), one of Asia's largest industrial estates.

== See also ==
- List of railway stations in Pakistan
- Pakistan Railways
