= Gaddar railway station =

Railway station in Pakistan

Gaddar Railway Station گڈار ریلوے اسٹیشن

General information
- Owner: Ministry of Railways
- Lines: Karachi–Peshawar Railway Line; Karachi Circular Railway

Other information
- Station code: GDR

Services
Preceding station	Pakistan Railways	Following station
Badal Nala towards Kiamari	Karachi–Peshawar Line	Dabheji towards Peshawar Cantonment
Preceding station	Karachi Circular Railway	Following station
Bin Qasim towards Karachi City	Main line	Dabheji Terminus
Location

Gaddar Railway Station (Urdu: گڈار ریلوے اسٹیشن, Sindhi: گڈار ریلوے اسٹیشن) is located in Karachi, Pakistan. The station was constructed in 1978.

== See also ==
- List of railway stations in Pakistan
- Pakistan Railways
