= Layari railway station =

Railway station in Karachi, Pakistan

Coordinates: 24.8603°N 66.9864°E

Lyari Station لیاری اسٹیشن

General information
- Owner: Ministry of Railways
- Line: Karachi Circular Railway

Other information
- Station code: LYR

Services
Preceding station	Karachi Circular Railway	Following station
Baldia Clockwise	Loop line (closed 1999, reopening proposed)	Wazir Mansion Anticlockwise
Location

Layari railway station (Urdu: لیاری ریلوے اسٹیشن, Sindhi: لياري ريلوي اسٽيشن) or Lyari railway station is located in Karachi, Pakistan.

== See also ==
- List of railway stations in Pakistan
- Pakistan Railways
