= Liaquatabad railway station =

Railway station in Sindh, Pakistan

Liaqatabad Railway Station {{Nastaliq| لیاقت آباد ریلوے اسٹیشن
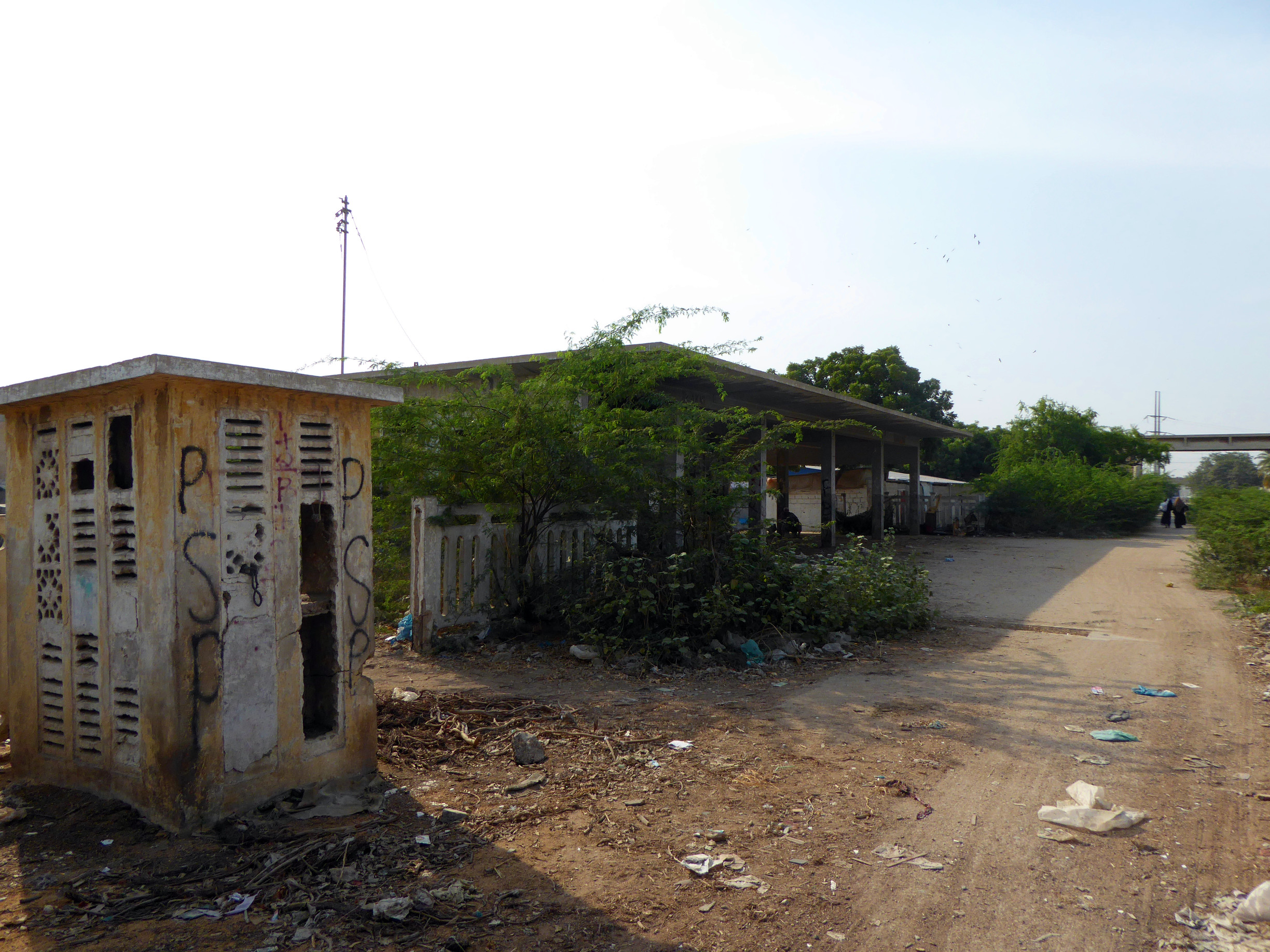

General information
- Coordinates: 24.9140°N 67.0541°E
- Owner: Ministry of Railways
- Line: Karachi Circular Railway
- Platforms: 2
- Tracks: 2

Other information
- Station code: LQD

History
- Opened: 1969

Services
Preceding station	Karachi Circular Railway	Following station
Gillani Clockwise	Loop line (closed 1999, reopening proposed)	North Nazimabad Anticlockwise
Location

Liaquatabad Railway Station (Urdu: لیا قت آباد ریلوے اسٹیشن, Sindhi: لياقت آباد ريلوي اسٽيشن) is an abandoned railway station on Karachi Circular Railway loop line in Sharifabad, neighborhoods of Liaquatabad Town in Karachi, Pakistan. This railway station used for KCR trains from 1969 to 1999.

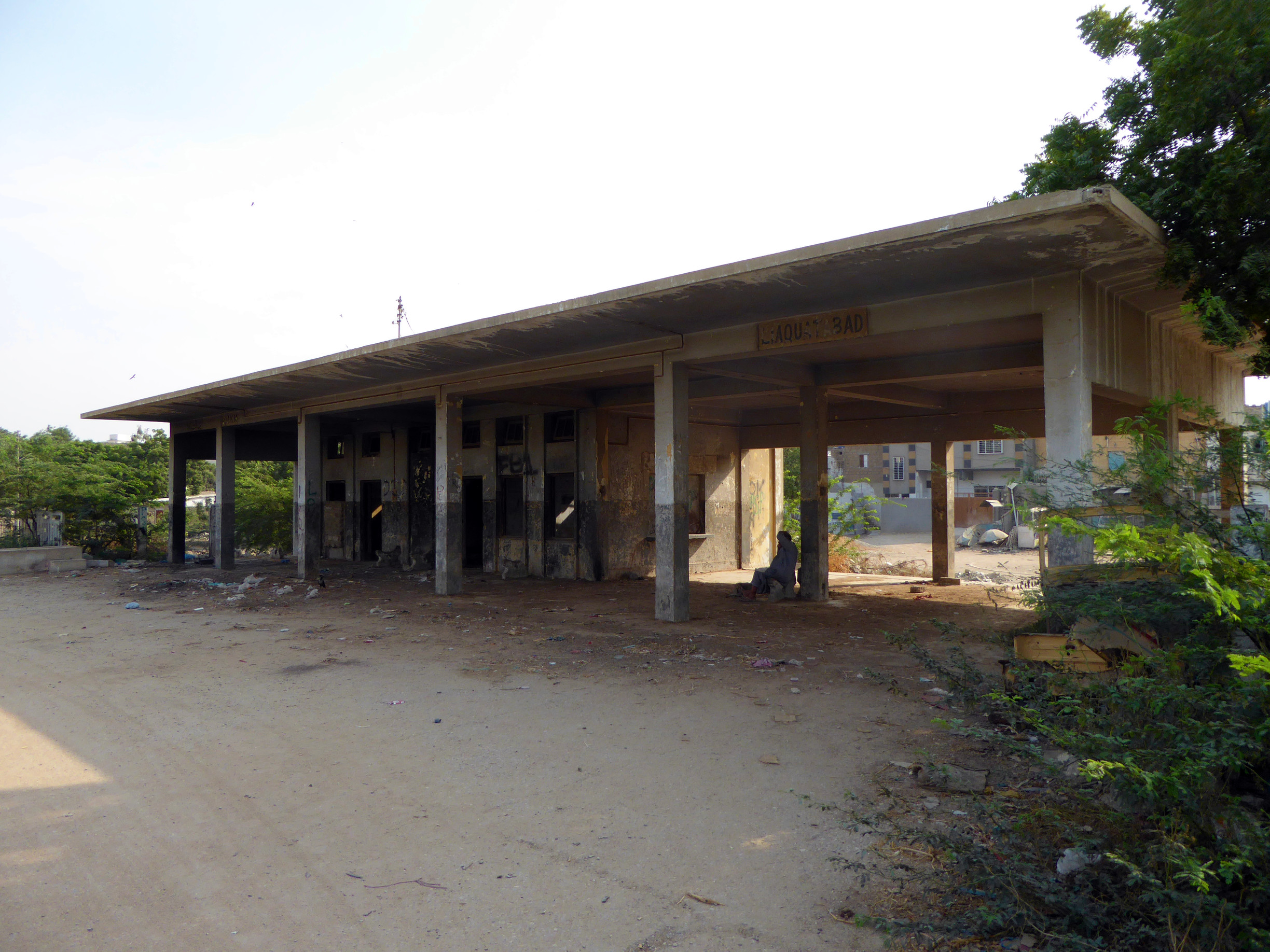
Liaquatabad railway station building

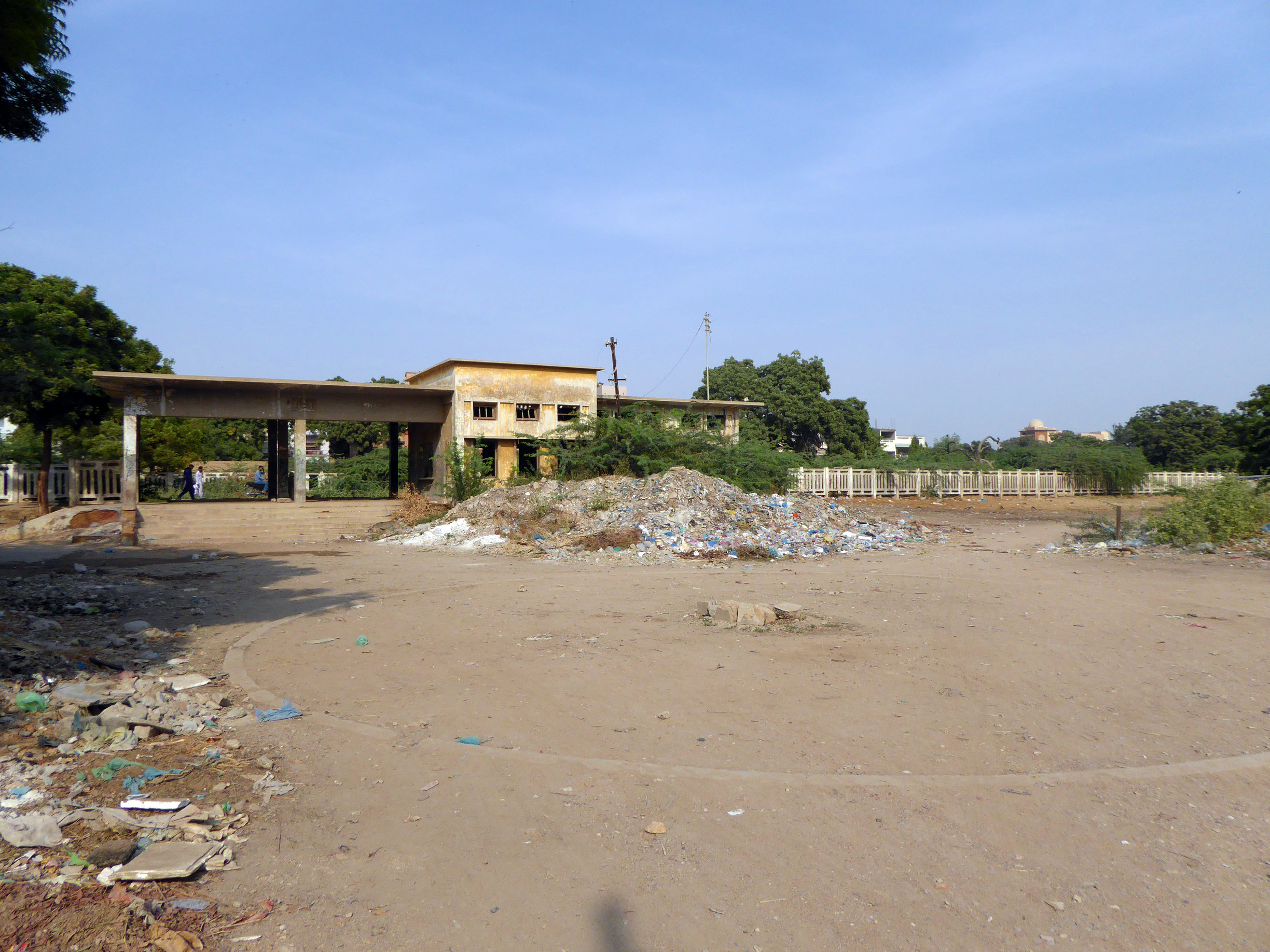
Liaquatabad railway station external view

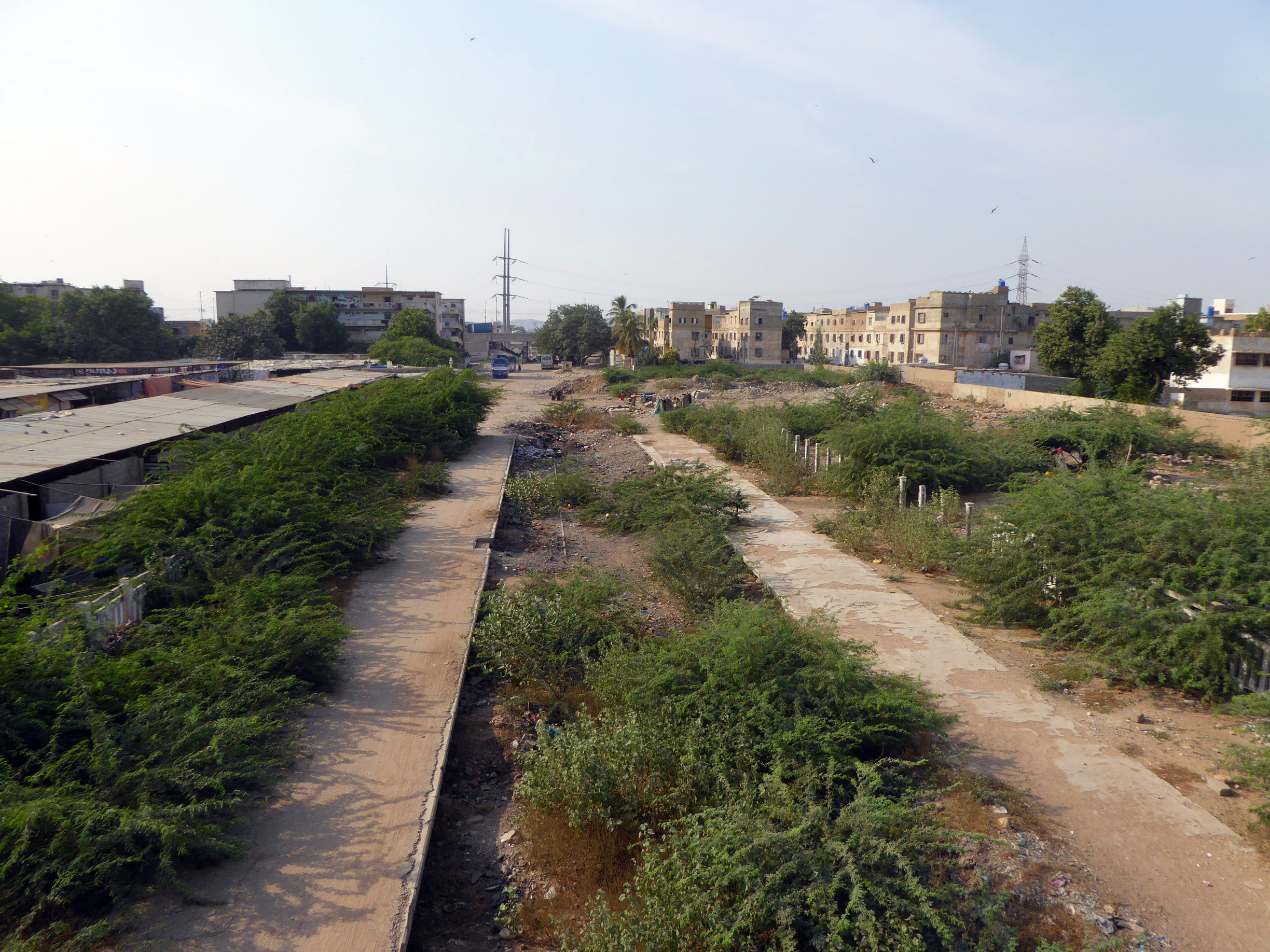
Liaquatabad railway station, view towards North Nazimabad from pedestrian bridge

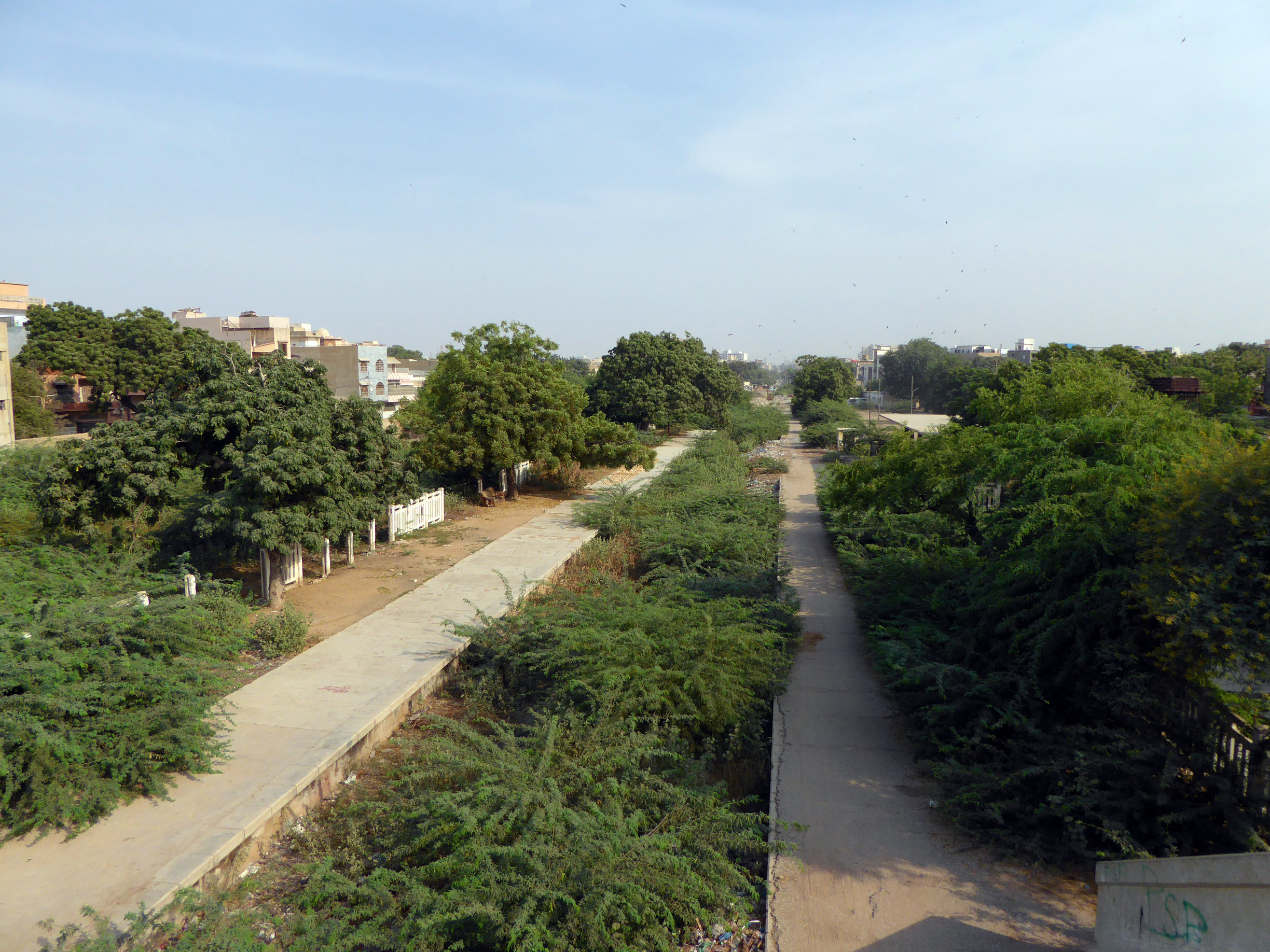
Liaquatabad railway station, view towards Gilani from pedestrian bridge

== Possible re-opening ==
The station might re-open if a planned re-opening of the KCR loop as a rapid transit scheme goes ahead.

== See also ==
- List of railway stations in Pakistan
- Pakistan Railways
