= Karachi Port Trust Halt railway station =

Railway station in Karachi, Pakistan

Karachi Port Trust Halt Station کراچی پورٹ ٹرسٹ ہالٹ ریلوے اسٹیشن

General information
- Coordinates: 24.8479°N 66.9901°E
- Owner: Ministry of Railways
- Line: Karachi Circular Railway

Other information
- Station code: KPT

Services
Preceding station	Karachi Circular Railway	Following station
Wazir Mansion Clockwise	Loop line (closed 1999, reopening proposed)	Karachi City Anticlockwise
Location

Karachi Port Trust Halt railway station (Urdu: کراچی پورٹ ٹرسٹ ہالٹ ریلوے اسٹیشن, Sindhi: ڪراچي پورٽ ٽرسٽ هالٽ ريلوي اسٽيشن) is located in Karachi, Pakistan.

Location:

Situated in the West Wharf area of Karachi, near the Port of Karachi.

Operational Status:

The station is currently permanently closed. Historically, it served as a stop on the KCR (Karachi Circular Railline) loop line before the loop was shut down in 1999. While there have been proposals to reopen it as part of KCR rehabilitation projects, it is not currently operational for passenger services.

Function: It was designed as a "halt" station, which typically means a small station without a full building or permanent staff, used for specific commuter stops.

Ownership: The station is owned and managed by the Ministry of Railways (Pakistan Railways)

Connection to Karachi Port Trust (KPT):

The station takes its name from the Karachi Port Trust, the federal agency that manages the Port of Karachi. While the station itself is a railway asset, it is strategically located to serve the workers and administrative needs of the KPT's West Wharf facilities.

== See also ==
- List of railway stations in Pakistan
- Pakistan Railways
