= Landhi Junction railway station =

Railway station in Karachi, Pakistan

Landhi Junction Railway Station لانڈھی ریلوے اسٹیشن لانڍي ريلوي اسٽيشن

General information
- Coordinates: 24.8508°N 67.2119°E
- Owner: Ministry of Railways
- Lines: Karachi–Peshawar Railway Line; Karachi Circular Railway

Other information
- Station code: LND

Services
Preceding station	Pakistan Railways	Following station
Malir towards Kiamari	Karachi–Peshawar Line	Jummah Goth towards Peshawar Cantonment
Preceding station	Karachi Circular Railway	Following station
Malir towards Karachi City	Main line	Jummah Goth towards Dabheji
Location

Landhi Junction Railway Station (Urdu: لانڈھی ریلوے اسٹیشن, Sindhi: لانڍي ريلوي اسٽيشن) is one of three major railway stations in Karachi, Pakistan. It is situated in the east end of the city, near Quaidabad in Landhi, and serves as a major stop along the Karachi–Peshawar Railway Line.

== History ==
At one point, Landhi Station served as the junction for the Landhi–Korangi Branch Line, and served as the terminus station for the Karachi Circular Railway - Main Line between 1969 and 1999.

== Facilities ==
Landhi Station is equipped with ticket reservation facilities.

== Services ==
The following trains stop at Landhi station:

Preceding station	Pakistan Railways	Following station
Karachi Cantonment Terminus	Awam Express	Jungshahi towards Peshawar Cantonment
Karachi Cantonment towards Karachi City	Bahauddin Zakaria Express	Jungshahi towards Multan Cantonment
Karachi Cantonment towards Karachi City	Bolan Mail	Jungshahi towards Quetta
Karachi Cantonment towards Karachi City	Fareed Express	Meting towards Lahore Junction
Karachi Cantonment towards Karachi City	Khushhal Khan Khattak Express	Kotri Junction towards Peshawar Cantonment
Karachi Cantonment Terminus	Khyber Mail	Hyderabad Junction towards Peshawar Cantonment
Karachi Cantonment Terminus	Pakistan Express	Hyderabad Junction towards Rawalpindi

== Incidents ==
- 2016 Karachi rail crash: On 3 November 2016, near this station two trains collided at this station resulting in 21 deaths and 65 injuries.

== See also ==
- Pakistan Railways
- List of railway stations in Pakistan
- Karachi Circular Railway
