= Dhabeji =

Coordinates: 24°47′N 67°31′E

Dhabeji ڌاٻيجي
- Town and union council
- Interactive map of Dhabeji ڌاٻيجي
- Country: Pakistan
- Region: Sindh
- Time zone: UTC+5 (PST)

Dhabeji (Urdu: دھابیجی; Sindhi: ڌاٻيجي) is a town and union council of Mirpur Sakro tehsil, Thatta District, Pakistan. It was previously in Thatta District, Sindh.

It is near the suburbs of Karachi. As well as being declared an industrial zone by the Government of Sindh there is also a water treatment plant providing water for Karachi City from the Indus River. There are some schools in the area.

Coordinates

Dhabeji is located at 24'47" N 67'31" E.

History

When, in late 711 AD, Imad-ud-din Muhammad bin Qasim, following two failed expeditions, led an army of 12000 to the kingdom of Sind, which was then ruled by a Brahman, Dahir, son of Chach, he crossed the frontier form Gedrosia, the modern Makran, then part of Caliphate, into the dominion of Dahir near Dhabeji, then called Armail, to besiege Debul, a town twenty-four mile south-west of the modern city of Thatta. Historically, the town was also called Darbeji.

== Dhabeji Special Economic Zone (DSEZ) ==
Dhabeji Special Economic Zone (DSEZ) is located in Thatta. DSEZ has been allotted 1530 acres of land. Dhabeji has easy access to Port Qasim.
