= Dabheji railway station =

Railway station in Pakistan

Dabheji Railway Station دابھیجی اسٹیشن
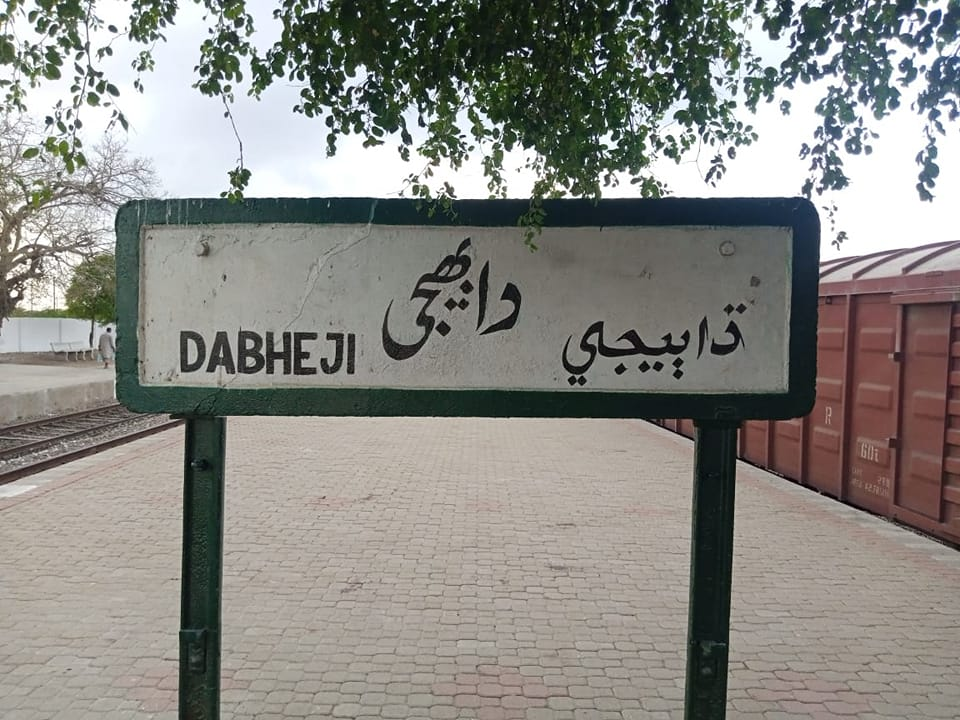

General information
- Coordinates: 24.8127°N 67.5011°E
- Owner: Ministry of Railways
- Lines: Karachi–Peshawar Railway Line; Karachi Circular Railway

Other information
- Station code: DBJ

History
- Opened: 1861

Services
| Preceding station | Pakistan Railways | Following station |
|---|---|---|
| Gaddar towards Kiamari | Karachi–Peshawar Line | Ran Pethani towards Peshawar Cantonment |
| Preceding station | Karachi Circular Railway | Following station |
| Gaddar towards Karachi City | Main line | Terminus |
Location

Dabheji Railway Station (Urdu: دابھیجی ریلوے اسٹیشن; Sindhi: ڌاٻيجي ريلوي اسٽيشن) is located at Dhabeji, near Karachi, Pakistan.

- List of railway stations in Pakistan
- Pakistan Railways
