= Shorkot–Sheikhupura Branch Line =

Railway line in Pakistan

Shorkot–Sheikhupura Branch Line شورکوٹ-شَيخُوپُور فرعی ریلوے خط

Overview
- Status: Operational
- Owner: Pakistan Railways
- Termini: Shorkot Cantonment Junction; Qila Sheikhupura Junction
- Stations: 12

Service
- Operator: Pakistan Railways

History
- Opened: 1 March 1911

Technical
- Line length: 218 km (135 mi)
- Track gauge: 1,676 mm (5 ft 6 in)
- Operating speed: 50 km/h (31 mph)

Shorkot–Sheikhupura Branch Line (Urdu: شورکوٹ-شَيخُوپُور فرعی ریلوے خط) is one of several branch lines in Pakistan, operated and maintained by Pakistan Railways. The line begins from Shorkot Cantonment Junction station and ends at Qila Sheikhupura Junction. The total length of this railway line is 218 kilometers (135 mi). There are 12 railway stations from Shorkot Junction to Qila Sheikhupura Junction.

== History ==
The Shorkot–Sheikhupura Branch Line was originally named as the Shorekot Road-Chichoki Railway as part of the North Western State Railway. Surveying for the railway line began in 1906 while construction began in 1907 and ended in 1911.

== Stations ==
- Shorkot Cantonment Junction
- Naim Ishfaq Shahid Halt (Abandoned)
- Pir Mahal
- Magneja (Abandoned)
- Kamalia
- Kot Darya Bal (Abandoned)
- Mamu Kanjan
- Manjhla Bagh (Abandoned)
- Kot Khair Din Halt (Abandoned)
- Kanjwani
- Rahme Shah (Abandoned)
- Chak Ibrahim Bhatti (Abandoned)
- Tandliawala
- Chak Turan Halt (Abandoned)
- Jhok Ditta (Abandoned)
- Sarwar Shaheed Halt (Abandoned)
- Rurala Road
- Pithu Rana Halt (Abandoned)
- Patla (Abandoned)
- Tufail Shahid Halt (Abandoned)
- Jaranwala
- Kot Daya Kishen (Abandoned)
- Panj Pulla Halt (Abandoned)
- Buchiana
- Zafarwal (Abandoned)
- Nankana Sahib
- Vakilwala (Abandoned)
- Warburton
- Mahmunwali (Abandoned)
- Bahuman (Abandoned)
- Bahrianwala (Abandoned)
- Qila Sheikhupura Junction
