= Badar Express =

Pakistani express train

Overview
- Service type: Inter-city rail
- First service: 1986
- Current operator: Pakistan Railways

Route
- Termini: Lahore Junction; Faisalabad
- Distance travelled: 142 kilometres (88 mi)
- Average journey time: 2 hours, 30 minutes
- Service frequency: Daily
- Train numbers: 111UP (Lahore→Faisalabad); 112DN (Faisalabad→Lahore)

On-board services
- Class: Economy Class

Technical
- Track gauge: 1,676 mm (5 ft 6 in)
- Track owner: Pakistan Railways

Badar Express (Urdu: بدر ایکسپریس) is a passenger train operated daily by Pakistan Railways between Lahore and Faisalabad in the province of Punjab, Pakistan. The trip takes approximately 2 hours and 30 minutes to cover a published distance of 142 kilometres (88 mi), traveling along a stretch of the Karachi–Peshawar Railway Line, Shahdara Bagh–Sangla Hill Branch Line and Khanewal–Wazirabad Branch Line.

== Route ==
- Lahore Junction–Shahdara Bagh Junction via Karachi–Peshawar Railway Line
- Shahdara Bagh Junction–Sangla Hill Junction via Shahdara Bagh–Sangla Hill Branch Line
- Sangla Hill Junction–Faisalabad via Khanewal–Wazirabad Branch Line

== Station stops ==
- Lahore Junction
- Qila Sheikhupura Junction
- Farooq Abad
- Bahalike
- Safdarabad
- Sangla Hill Junction
- Chak Jhumra Junction
- Faisalabad

== Equipment ==
Badar Express offers Economy Class accommodations.

== Badar Express Train Timing ==
=== Up Faisalabad To Lahore ===
Train Code:111UP
Stop	Arrival	Departure
Faisalabad	--	05:45
Chak Jhumra	06:05	06:06
Sangla Hill	06:28	06:30
Safdarabad	06:47	06:49
Bahalike	07:01	07:02
Farooqabad	07:16	07:16
Qila Sheikhupura	07:32	07:34
Lahore	08:45	End

=== Down Lahore To Faisalabad Timings ===
Train Code:112DN
Stop	Arrival	Departure
Lahore	Start	09:30
Qila Sheikhupura	10:20	10:22
Farooqabad	10:37	10:38
Bahalike	10:52	10:53
Safdarabad	11:05	11:07
Sangla Hill	11:24	11:26
Chak Jhumra	11:50	11:51
Faisalabad	12:25	End
