= Ghouri Express =

Pakistani express train

Overview
- Service type: Inter-city rail
- First service: 1981
- Current operator: Pakistan Railways

Route
- Termini: Lahore Junction; Faisalabad
- Distance travelled: 142 kilometres (88 mi)
- Average journey time: 2 hours, 30 minutes
- Service frequency: Daily
- Train numbers: 113UP (Lahore→Faisalabad); 114DN (Faisalabad→Lahore)

On-board services
- Class: Economy Class

Technical
- Track gauge: 1,676 mm (5 ft 6 in)
- Track owner: Pakistan Railways

Ghouri Express (Urdu: غوری ایکسپریس) is a passenger train operated daily by Pakistan Railways between Lahore and Faisalabad. The trip takes approximately 2 hours, 30 minutes to cover a published distance of 142 kilometres (88 mi), traveling along a stretch of the Karachi–Peshawar Railway Line, Shahdara Bagh–Sangla Hill Branch Line and Khanewal–Wazirabad Branch Line.

== Route ==
- Lahore Junction–Shahdara Bagh Junction via Karachi–Peshawar Railway Line
- Shahdara Bagh Junction–Sangla Hill Junction via Shahdara Bagh–Sangla Hill Branch Line
- Sangla Hill Junction–Faisalabad via Khanewal–Wazirabad Branch Line

== Station stops ==
- Lahore Junction
- Qila Sheikhupura Junction
- Safdarabad
- Sangla Hill Junction
- Faisalabad

== Equipment ==
The train has Economy Class accommodations.
