= Patal =

Patal (Persian: پاتل) may refer to:

- Patal, Fars
- Patal, Hormozgan
- Patal-e Isin, Hormozgan

== See also ==
- Patala (disambiguation)
- Patel, a surname
