= Chak Ibrahim Bhatti railway station =

Railway station in Pakistan

Chak Ibrahim Bhatti Station چک ابراہیم بھٹی ریلوے اسٹیشن

General information
- Coordinates: 30.9777°N 73.0510°E
- Owner: Ministry of Railways
- Line: Shorkot–Sheikhupura Branch Line

Other information
- Station code: COB

Services
Preceding station	Pakistan Railways	Following station
Mandi Rahme Shah towards Shorkot Cantonment Junction	Shorkot–Sheikhupura Branch Line	Tandliawala towards Qila Sheikhupura Junction
Location
- Location within Pakistan Location within Punjab, Pakistan

Chak Ibrahim Bhatti Railway Station (Urdu: چک ابراہیم بھٹی ریلوے اسٹیشن, Punjabi: چک ابراہیم بھٹی ریلوے اسٹیشن) is located in Faisalabad District of Punjab, Pakistan

== See also ==
- List of railway stations in Pakistan
- Pakistan Railways
