= Chichoki Mallian railway station =

Railway station in Pakistan

Chichoki Mallian Railway Station چیچوکی ملیاں ریلوے اسٹیشن

General information
- Coordinates: 31.7029°N 74.0771°E
- Owner: Ministry of Railways
- Line: Shahdara Bagh–Sangla Hill Branch Line

Other information
- Station code: CCM

Services
Preceding station	Pakistan Railways	Following station
Qila Sattar Shah towards Shahdara Bagh Junction	Shahdara Bagh–Sangla Hill Branch Line	Qila Sheikhupura Junction towards Sangla Hill Junction
Location

Chichoki Mallian Railway Station (Urdu: چیچوکی ملیاں ریلوے اسٹیشن, Punjabi: چیچوکی ملیاں ریلوے اسٹیشن) is located in Sheikhupura District, Pakistan.

== See also ==
- List of railway stations in Pakistan
- Pakistan Railways
