= Kot Daya Kishen railway station =

Railway station in Pakistan

Kot Daya Kishan

General information
- Coordinates: 31.390278°N 73.476389°E
- Owner: Pakistan Ministry of Railways
- Line: Shorkot–Sheikhupura Branch Line

Other information
- Station code: KVW

History
- Former names: Great Indian Peninsula Railway

Services
Preceding station	Pakistan Railways	Following station
Jaranwala towards Shorkot Cantonment Junction	Shorkot–Sheikhupura Branch Line	Punj Pulla towards Qila Sheikhupura Junction
Location

Kot Daya Kishan Railway Station (Urdu: کوٹ دیا کشین ریلوے اسٹیشن) is located in Pakistan near Chak 236 GB Kilanwala tehsil Jaranwala on Shorkot–Sheikhupura Branch Line This station is closed nowadays. This station was constructed between 1906 and 1911.

== See also ==
- List of railway stations in Pakistan
- Pakistan Railways
- Chak 236 GB Kilanwala
