= Sachcha Sauda railway station =

Railway station in Pakistan

Coordinates: 31°45′N 73°48′E

Sachcha Sauda Railway Station سچا سودا ریلوے اسٹیشن

General information
- Owner: Ministry of Railways
- Line: Shahdara Bagh–Sangla Hill Branch Line

Other information
- Station code: SCS

Services
Preceding station	Pakistan Railways	Following station
Farooq Abad towards Shahdara Bagh Junction	Shahdara Bagh–Sangla Hill Branch Line	Bahalike towards Sangla Hill Junction
Location

Sachcha Sauda Railway Station (Urdu: سچا سودا ریلوے اسٹیشن, Punjabi: سچا سوا ریلوے اسٹیشن) is located in Sheikhupura District, Pakistan.

== See also ==
- List of railway stations in Pakistan
- Pakistan Railways
- Rachand
