= Tandliawala railway station =

Railway station in Pakistan

Tandliawala Railway Station تاندلیانوالا ریلوے اسٹیشن

General information
- Coordinates: 31.0322°N 73.1399°E
- Owner: Ministry of Railways
- Line: Shorkot–Sheikhupura Branch Line

Other information
- Station code: TLW

Services
| Preceding station | Pakistan Railways | Following station |
|---|---|---|
| Kanjwani towards Shorkot Cantonment Junction | Shorkot–Sheikhupura Branch Line | Jhok Ditta towards Qila Sheikhupura Junction |
Location

Tandliawala Railway Station (Urdu: تاندلیانوالا ریلوے اسٹیشن, Punjabi: تاندلیانوالا ریلوے اسٹیشن) is located in the town of Tandlianwala, in Faisalabad District, Punjab, Pakistan.

== See also ==
- List of railway stations in Pakistan
- Pakistan Railways
