= Muhammad Safdar Shakir =

Pakistani politician

Member of the Provincial Assembly of the Punjab
- In office 15 August 2018 – 12 January 2023
- Constituency: PP-104 Faisalabad-VIII

Member of the Provincial Assembly of the Punjab
- In office 2002–2007

Member of the Provincial Assembly of the Punjab
- In office 1988–1993

Personal details
- Born: 13 January 1952 (age 74) Mamu Kanjan, Pakistan
- Party: Pakistan Muslim League (N) (2018-present)
- Other political affiliations: PTI (2013-2018); PML-Q (2001-2013); PMLN (1993-2001); Islami Jamhoori Ittehad (1988-1993); Pakistan Muslim League (1985-1988)

Muhammad Safdar Shakir (born 13 January 1952) is a Pakistani politician who was a member of the Provincial Assembly of the Punjab from August 2018 till January 2023.

== Early life ==
He was born on 13 January 1952 in Mamu Kanjan, Punjab, Pakistan. His family belongs to a very religious background. his father started the SOAP manufacturing business as the "KHAJOOR Marka SOAP" factory.

== Political career ==
He was elected to the Provincial Assembly of the Punjab as a candidate of Pakistan Muslim League (N) from Constituency PP-104 (Faisalabad-VIII) in the 2018 Pakistani general election.
