= Missan Kalar railway station =

Railway station in Pakistan

Missan Kalar Railway Station مسان کلر ریلوے اسٹیشن

General information
- Coordinates: 31.6678°N 74.2140°E
- Owner: Ministry of Railways
- Line: Shahdara Bagh–Sanga Hill Branch Line

Other information
- Station code: MSKR

Services
Preceding station	Pakistan Railways	Following station
Shahdara Bagh Junction Terminus	Shahdara Bagh–Sangla Hill Branch Line	Qila Sattar Shah towards Sangla Hill Junction
Location

Missan Kalar Railway Station (Urdu: مسان کلر ریلوے اسٹیشن, Punjabi: مسان کلر ریلوے اسٹیشن) is located in Sheikhupura District, Punjab, Pakistan. The surrounding villages include Missan and Missan Kalar, divided by the M2. Nearest motorway entry point is Kot Abdul Malik toll plaza.

== See also ==
- List of railway stations in Pakistan
- Pakistan Railways
