= Munawar Shakeel =

Pakistani poet, writer

- Born: 1969 (age 56–57); Village near Rurala Road, Jaranwala Tehsil, Faisalabad District, Punjab, Pakistan
- Citizenship: Pakistani
- Occupations: Cobbler, poet
- Writing career
- Language: Punjabi
- Years active: Since 1990
- Subject: Social
- Notable work: Five Punjabi-language poetry books

Munawar Shakeel (Punjabi and Urdu: منور شکیل) (born 1969) is a Pakistani poet, writing in the Punjabi language.

== Early life; career ==
Skakeel was born in 1969 in a village near the town of Rurala Road – 25 km from Jaranwala (city) in the Faisalabad District, Punjab, Pakistan.

By profession, he is a roadside cobbler. A writer of five Punjabi-language award-winning books, he used to write poetry while repairing shoes. Bashir Hamid, the headmaster of 282 GB, was his mentor.

== Books ==
- first book – Soch Samandar (Punjabi سوچ سمندر ) was published in 2004
- second book – Pardes Di Sangat (Punjabi سنگت پردیس دی ) was published in 2005
- third book – Saddiyan De Bhait ( صدیاں دے بھیت) was published in 2009
- fourth book – Jhora Dhap Gawachi Da (چھورا دھپ گوچی دا) was published in 2011
- fifth book – Akhaan Mitti Ho Gaiyaan Ankhaian (مٹی ہو گئیاں اکھیاں) was published in 2013

== Awards and memberships ==
Shakeel has received awards from organisations, including the Ashna-e-Saandal Bar, the Pakistan Writers Guild, and Punjabi Sevak.

He is a member of literary groups, including the Royal Adabi Academy, Jaranwala and the Naqeebi Karvan-e-Adab.
