= Mamu Kanjan railway station =

Railway station in Pakistan

Mamu Kanjan Railway Station مامُوں کانجن ریلوے اسٹیشن
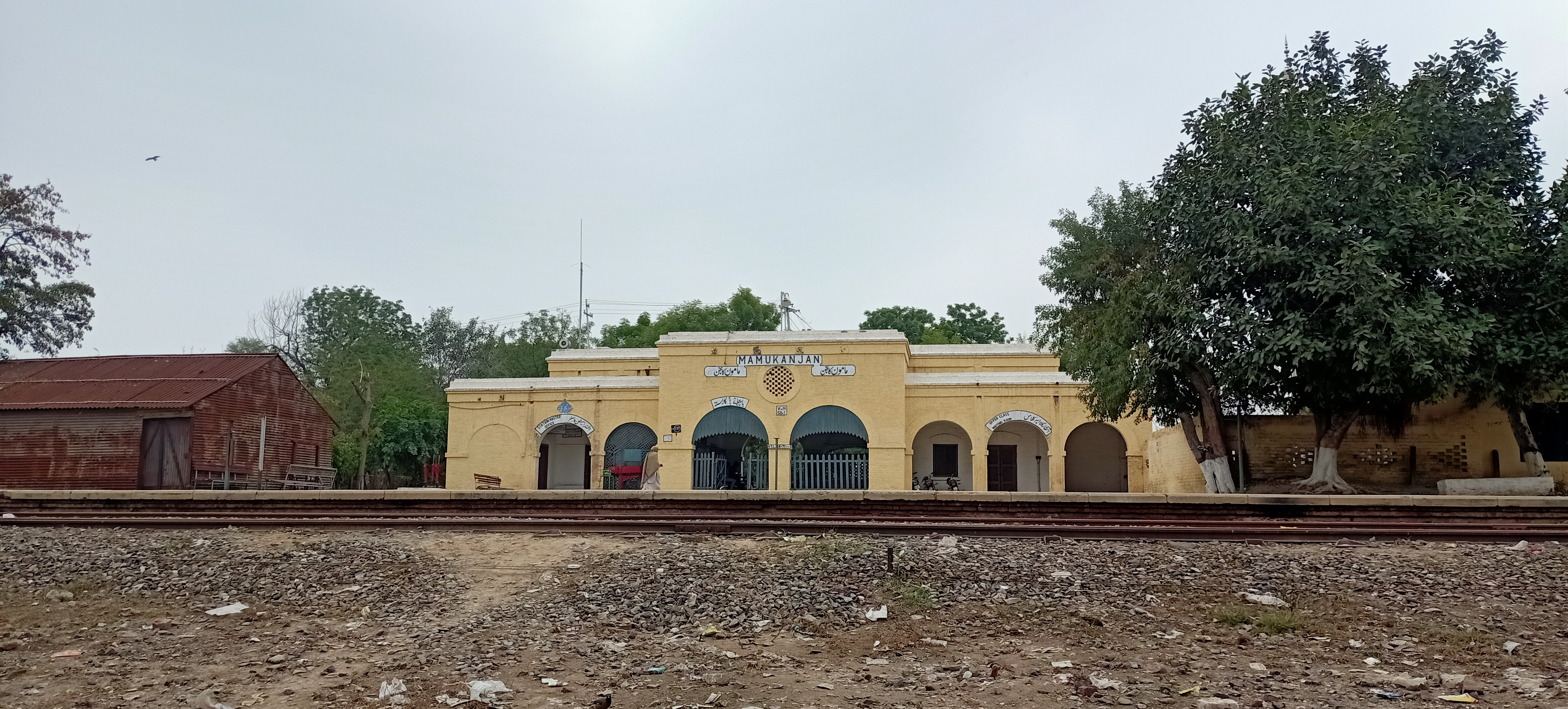

General information
- Coordinates: 30.8324°N 72.7992°E
- Owner: Ministry of Railways
- Line: Shorkot–Sheikhupura Branch Line

Other information
- Station code: MMX

Services
Preceding station	Pakistan Railways	Following station
Pir Mahal towards Shorkot Cantonment Junction	Shorkot–Sheikhupura Branch Line	Kanjwani towards Qila Sheikhupura Junction
Location

Mamu Kanjan Railway Station (Urdu: مامُوں کانجن ریلوے اسٹیشن, Punjabi: مامُوں کانجن ریلوے اسٹیشن) is located in the town of Mamu Kanjan, Faisalabad district, in the province of Punjab, Pakistan. The station is located in the city center.

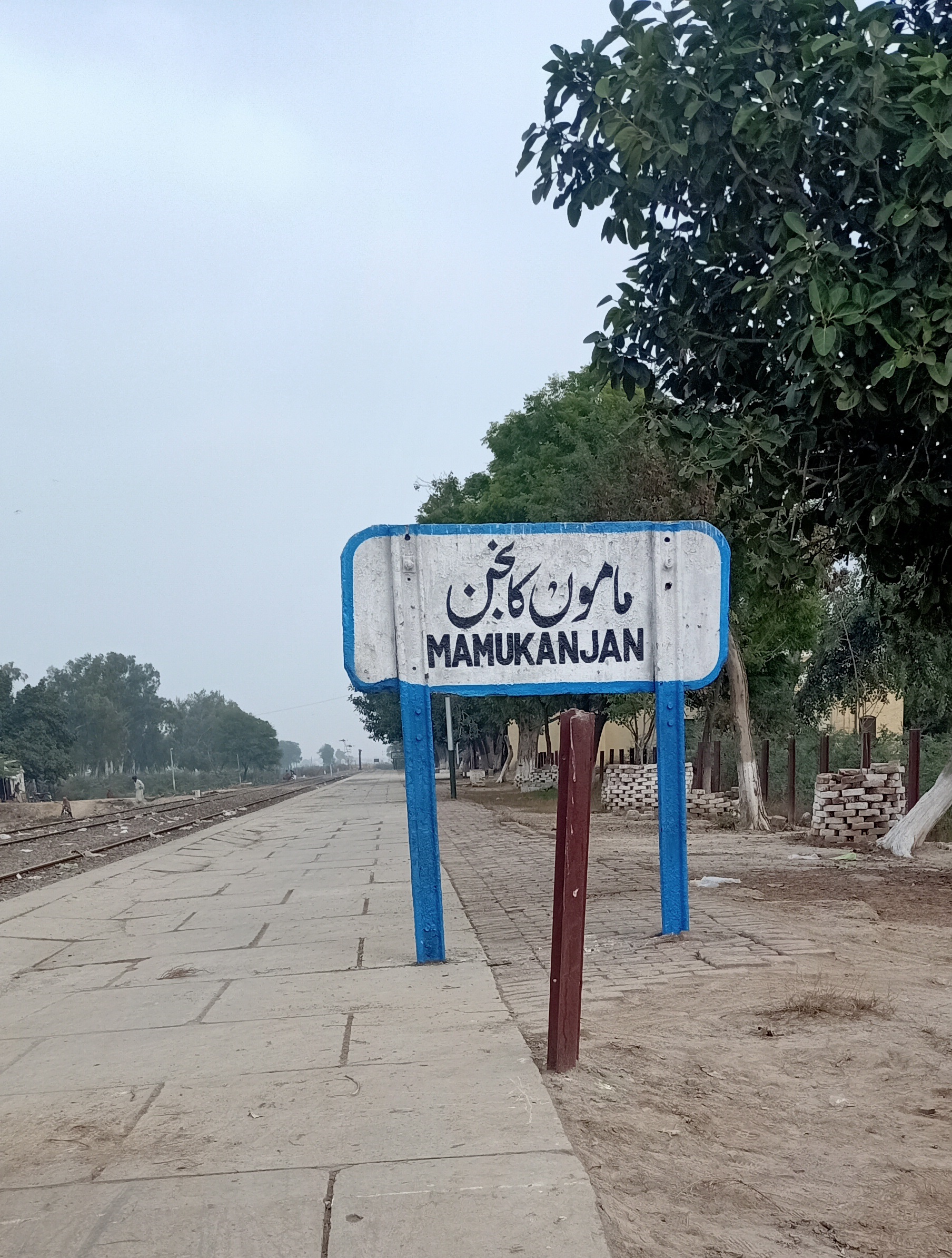

== See also ==
- List of railway stations in Pakistan
- Pakistan Railways
- Mamu Kanjan
