= Nankana Sahib railway station =

Railway station in Pakistan

Nankana Sahib Station ننکانہ صاحب ریلوے اسٹیشن
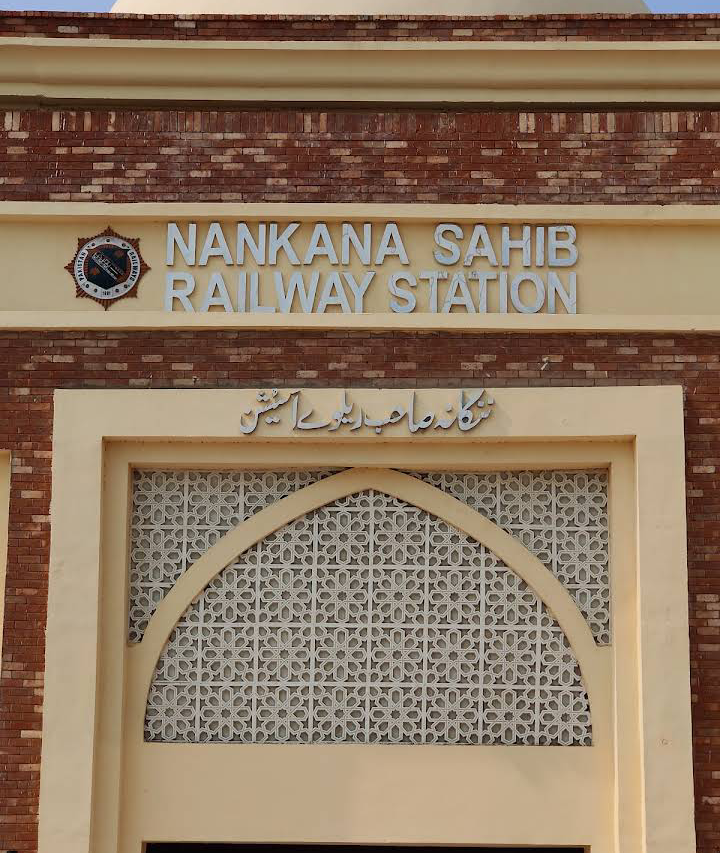

General information
- Coordinates: 31.4554°N 73.7090°E
- Owner: Ministry of Railways
- Line: Shorkot–Sheikhupura Branch Line
- Platforms: 1
- Tracks: 3

Construction
- Parking: Available
- Accessible: Available

Other information
- Station code: NNS

Services
Preceding station	Pakistan Railways	Following station
Buchiana towards Shorkot Cantonment Junction	Shorkot–Sheikhupura Branch Line	Warburton towards Qila Sheikhupura Junction
Location

Nankana Sahib Railway Station (Urdu: ننکانہ صاحب ریلوے اسٹیشن, Punjabi: ننکانہ صاحب ریلوے اسٹیشناسٹیشن /ਨਨਕਾਣਾ ਸਾਹਿਬ ਰੇਲਵੇ ਸਟੇਸ਼ਨ) is located in Nankana Sahib city, Nankana Sahib district of Punjab province of Pakistan. The new station building has been constructed in 2021 and the old station building has been demolished.

== See also ==
- List of railway stations in Pakistan
- Pakistan Railways
