= Buchiana =

Buchiana بچیانہ
- Town
- Buchiana
- Location within Punjab, Pakistan Location within Pakistan
- Coordinates: 31°25′22.4″N 73°33′33.7″E
- Country: Pakistan
- Province: Punjab
- District: Faisalabad District
- Administrative divisions: Jaranwala Tehsil
- Time zone: UTC+5 (PST)
- Calling code: 041

Buchiana (Urdu: بچیانہ) is a small town in Faisalabad District's Jaranwala Tehsil established as Buchina Mandi (Grain Market), in Pakistan. Buchiana is located in the area of Chak 656/7 GB. The town is served by Buchiana railway station on Shorkot–Sheikhupura Branch Line of Pakistan Railways. It is on Jaranwala-Nankana Road, 20 km from Jaranwala From Buchiana there is operational 2 ft (610 mm) narrow gauge horse-drawn tramway originally built in 1898 to connect with the Buchiana railway station 3 kilometres (1.9 mi) to the south Ghangha Pur .
