= Chajjwal =

Chajjwal is a small village located on Satayana Road in Faisalabad District, of central Punjab, Pakistan. The village is 30 km from Faisalabad and 15 km from Tandlianwala. Chajjwal has a population of around 5,000 people.
