= Jhok Ditta railway station =

Railway station in Pakistan

Jhok Ditta Railway Station جھوک دِتّہ ریلوے اسٹیشن

General information
- Coordinates: 31.1279°N 73.2250°E
- Owner: Ministry of Railways
- Line: Shorkot–Sheikhupura Branch Line

Other information
- Station code: JWT

Services
Preceding station	Pakistan Railways	Following station
Tandliawala towards Shorkot Cantonment Junction	Shorkot–Sheikhupura Branch Line	Rurala Road towards Qila Sheikhupura Junction
Location

Jhok Ditta Railway Station (Urdu: جھوک دِتّہ ریلوے اسٹیشن, Punjabi: جھوک دِتّہ ریلوے اسٹیشن) is located in Punjab, Pakistan.

== See also ==
- List of railway stations in Pakistan
- Pakistan Railways
