= Ghangha Pur =

Gangapur گنگاپور
- Location within Pakistan
- Coordinates: 31.450748°N 73.564821°E
- Country: Pakistan
- Elevation: 193 m (633 ft)

Population (1998)
  - Total: 10,988
- Time zone: UTC+5 (PST)

Gangapur is a village near Buchiana mandi in Jaranwala Tehsil in Faisalabad District, Punjab, Pakistan. It is located at 31°27'12N 73°33'57E at an altitude of 193 metres (636 feet) and is part of union council 39 of Jaranwala with a population of 10,988.

== History ==
It is named after the philanthropist Sir Ganga Ram.

The village is home to an operational 2 ft (610 mm) narrow gauge horse-drawn tramway originally built in 1898 to connect with the Buchiana railway station 3 kilometres (1.9 mi) to the south of Ghangha Pur .
