= Naim Ishfaq Shahid Halt railway station =

Railway station in Pakistan

Naim Ishfaq Shahid Halt Station نعیم اشفاق شاہد ہالٹ ریلوے اسٹیشن

General information
- Coordinates: 30.7828°N 72.3391°E
- Owner: Ministry of Railways
- Line: Shorkot–Sheikhupura Branch Line

Other information
- Station code: NASD

Services
Preceding station	Pakistan Railways	Following station
Shorkot Cantonment Junction Terminus	Shorkot–Sheikhupura Branch Line	Pir Mahal towards Qila Sheikhupura Junction
Location

Naim Ishfaq Shahid Halt Railway Station (Urdu: نعیم اشفاق شاہد ہالٹ ریلوے اسٹیشن, Punjabi: نعیم اشفاق شاہد ہالٹ ریلوے اسٹیشن) is located near Shorkot Cantonment in Pakistan.

== See also ==
- List of railway stations in Pakistan
- Pakistan Railways
