= KJK =

KJK or kjk can refer to:

- Flanders International Airport, an airport near Kortrijk, Belgium
- Highland Konjo language, Austronesian language of Indonesia
- Kanjwani railway station, near Tandlianwala, Punjab, Pakistan
- Karl-Jaspers-Klinik Wehnen, a psychiatric clinic in Wehnen, Germany
- Komalen Jinen Kurdistan, Kurdish women's advocacy organization
- Kystjegerkommandoen, unit in the Royal Norwegian Navy
