= Chak 500 GB =

Coordinates: 30°50′N 72°48′E

- Town
- چک نمبر 500 گ ب جھوک باہلی
- Location within Punjab, Pakistan Location within Pakistan
- Country: Pakistan
- Province: Punjab
- District: Faisalabad

Area
  - Total: 2 km^{2} (0.77 sq mi)
- Elevation: 183 m (600 ft)

Population (2017)
  - Total: 600
- Time zone: UTC+5 (PST)
- ZIP code(s): 37000
- Calling code: 041

Chak 500 GB is a village of the city of Faisalabad, in central Punjab, Pakistan. It is situated near the bank of a canal. The area around the village produces vegetables and many other foods. It is 32 km from Sahiwal, 90 km from Faisalabad and 190 km from Lahore via M3 motorway.

From the nearby Bangla Chowk lead five roads : Kamalia road, Tandlianwala road, Muridwala road, Kilianwala-Sahiwal road and Bullay Shah River Ravi Road.

== Education ==
In Chak No 500 GB there are two schools. They are:

- Govt. Middle School for Girls Chak 500 GB
- Govt. Primary School for boys Chak 500 GB

== Agriculture ==
Commons crops in this area are watermelon of near Ravi River, sugarcane, wheat, corn, and rice.
