= Padala (disambiguation) =

Padala is a village of West Godavari district, in the Indian state of Andhra Pradesh.

Padala may also refer to:

- Padala, Bulgaria, a village in Kyustendil Province
- Padala Aruna (born 1957), Indian politician from Andhra Pradesh
- Padala Bhudevi, Indian social activist
- Padala Glacier, Antarctica

== See also ==
- Patala (disambiguation)
- Patla (disambiguation)
