= KVW =

KVW or kvw may refer to:

- KVW, the station code for Kot Daya Kishen railway station, Pakistan
- kvw, the ISO 639-3 code for Wersing language, Indonesia
