= Rurala Road railway station =

Railway station in Pakistan

Rurala Road Railway Station رورالا روڈ ریلوے اسٹیشن

General information
- Coordinates: 31.1988°N 73.2989°E
- Owner: Ministry of Railways
- Line: Shorkot–Sheikhupura Branch Line

Other information
- Station code: RRLN

Services
Preceding station	Pakistan Railways	Following station
Jhok Ditta towards Shorkot Cantonment Junction	Shorkot–Sheikhupura Branch Line	Jaranwala towards Qila Sheikhupura Junction
Location

Rurala Road Railway Station (Urdu: رورالا روڈ ریلوے اسٹیشن, Punjabi: رورالا روڈ ریلوے اسٹیشن) is located in the town of Rurala Road, Faisalabad District, Punjab, Pakistan.

== See also ==
- List of railway stations in Pakistan
- Pakistan Railways
