= Pir Mahal railway station =

Railway station in Pakistan

Pir Mahal Railway Station پیر محل ریلوے اسٹیشن
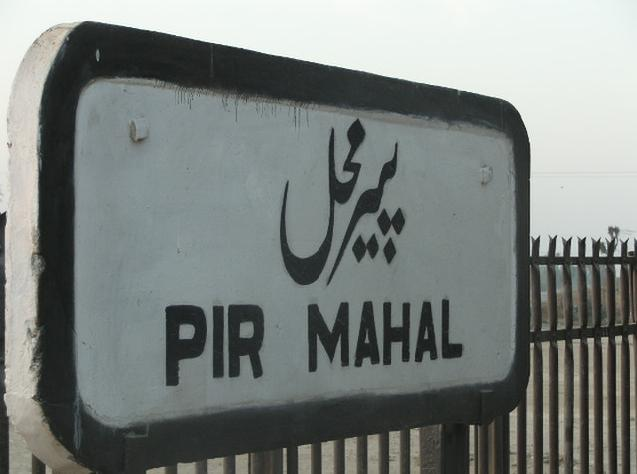

General information
- Coordinates: 30.7625°N 72.4245°E
- Owner: Ministry of Railways
- Line: Shorkot–Sheikhupura Branch Line

Other information
- Station code: PMX

History
- Opened: 1907

Services
Preceding station	Pakistan Railways	Following station
Naim Ishfaq Shahid Halt towards Shorkot Cantonment Junction	Shorkot–Sheikhupura Branch Line	Mamu Kanjan towards Qila Sheikhupura Junction
Location

Pir Mahal Railway Station (Urdu: پیر محل ریلوے اسٹیشن, Punjabi: پیر محل ریلوے اسٹیشن) is located in town of Pir Mahal district of Toba Tek Singh, Pakistan.

== See also ==
- List of railway stations in Pakistan
- Pakistan Railways
