= Nawan Pind Halt railway station =

Railway station in Pakistan

Nawan Pind Halt Station نواں پنڈ ہالٹ ریلوے اسٹیشن

General information
- Owner: Ministry of Railways
- Line: Shahdara Bagh–Sangla Hill Branch Line

Other information
- Station code: NWZ

Services
Preceding station	Pakistan Railways	Following station
Bahalike towards Shahdara Bagh Junction	Shahdara Bagh–Sangla Hill Branch Line	Safdarabad towards Sangla Hill Junction
Location

Nawan Pind Halt Railway Station (Urdu: نواں پنڈ ہالٹ ریلوے اسٹیشن, Punjabi: نواں پنڈ ہالٹ ریلوے اسٹیشن) is located in Sheikhupura District, Pakistan.

== See also ==
- List of railway stations in Pakistan
- Pakistan Railways
