= Qila Sattar Shah railway station =

Railway station in Pakistan

Qila Sattar Shah Station قِلعہ ستُار شاہ ریلوے اسٹیشن

General information
- Coordinates: 31.6852°N 74.1453°E
- Owner: Ministry of Railways
- Line: Shahdara Bagh–Sangla Hill Branch Line

Other information
- Station code: QSS

Services
| Preceding station | Pakistan Railways | Following station |
|---|---|---|
| Missan Kalar towards Shahdara Bagh Junction | Shahdara Bagh–Sangla Hill Branch Line | Chichoki Mallian towards Sangla Hill Junction |
Location

Qila Sattar Shah Railway Station (Urdu: قِلعہ ستُار شاہ ریلوے اسٹیشن, Punjabi: قِلعہ ستُار شاہ ریلوے اسٹیشن) is in Qila Sattar Shah, Sheikhupura District, Pakistan.

== Incidents ==
On March 16, 2002, a train from Lahore to Faisalabad derailed at this station leaving 7 died and 15 injured.

== See also ==
- List of railway stations in Pakistan
- Pakistan Railways
