= Abdullahpur Kolar railway station =

Pakistani railway station

Abdullahpur Kolar Station عبد الله پور کولار ریلوے اسٹیشن
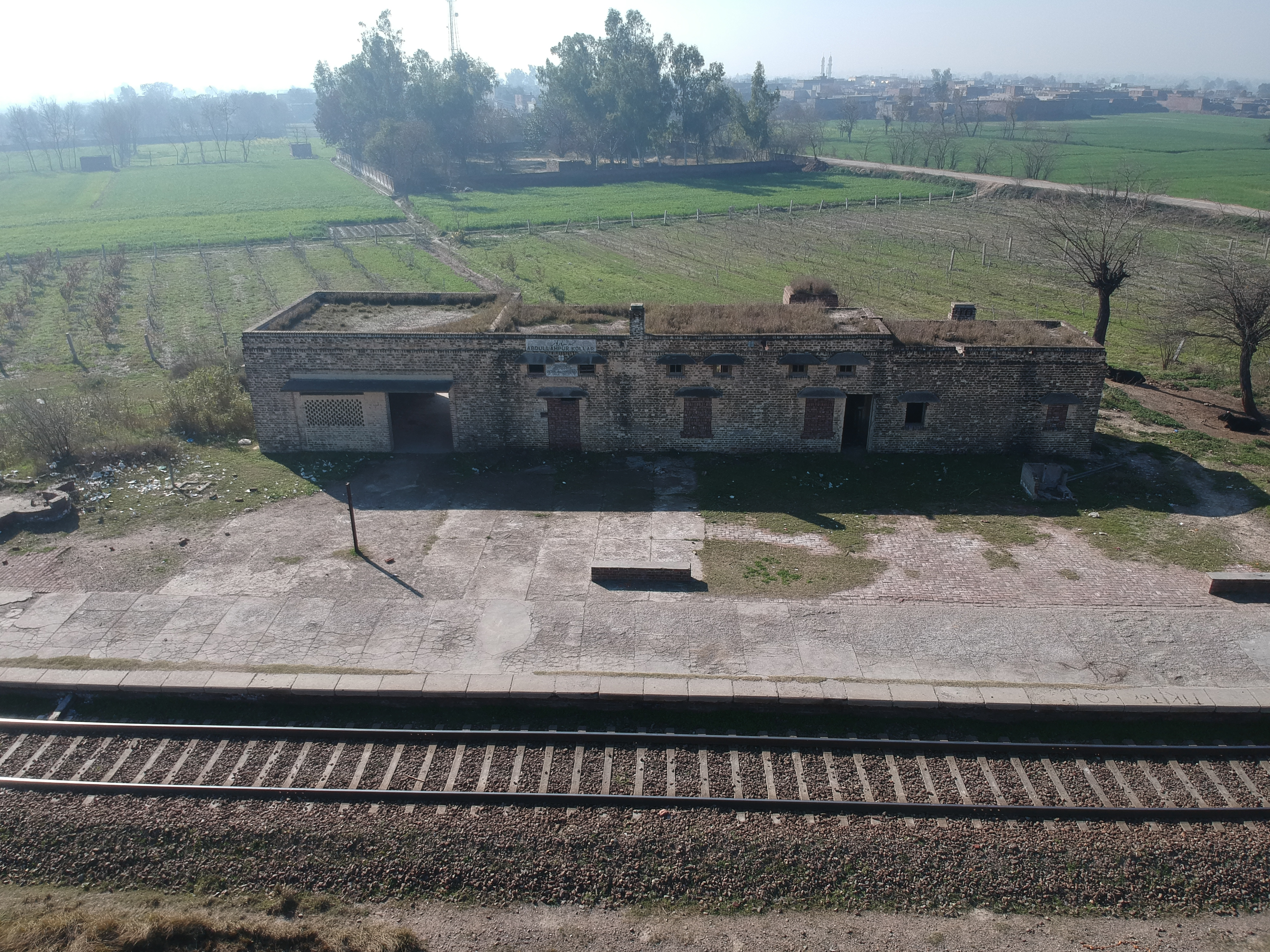

General information
- Coordinates: 31.7311°N 73.5339°E
- Owner: Ministry of Railways
- Line: Shahdara Bagh–Sangla Hill Branch Line

Other information
- Station code: ABDK

Services
Preceding station	Pakistan Railways	Following station
Safdarabad towards Shahdara Bagh Junction	Shahdara Bagh–Sangla Hill Branch Line	Momin towards Sangla Hill Junction
Location

Abdullahpur Kolar railway station (Urdu: عبد الله پور کولار ریلوے اسٹیشن, Punjabi: عبد الله پور کولار ریلوے اسٹیشن) is located in Sheikhupura District, Pakistan.

== See also ==
- List of railway stations in Pakistan
- Pakistan Railways
