= Mandi Rahme Shah railway station =

Railway station in Pakistan

Coordinates: 30°57′N 73°00′E

Mandi Rahme Shah Station منڈی رحمی شاہ ریلوے اسٹیشن

General information
- Owner: Ministry of Railways
- Line: Shorkot–Sheikhupura Branch Line

Other information
- Station code: CRHH

Services
Preceding station	Pakistan Railways	Following station
Kanjwani towards Shorkot Cantonment Junction	Shorkot–Sheikhupura Branch Line	Chak Ibrahim Bhatti towards Qila Sheikhupura Junction
Location

Mandi Rahme Shah Railway Station (Urdu: منڈی رحمی شاہ ریلوے اسٹیشن, Punjabi: منڈی رحمی شاہ ریلوے اسٹیشن) is located in the town of Mandi Rahme Shah, within the Faisalabad District of Punjab, Pakistan.

== See also ==
- List of railway stations in Pakistan
- Pakistan Railways
