= Patala (disambiguation) =

Patala in Indian religions denotes the subterranean realms of the universe.

Patala may also refer to:

- Patala, Uttar Pradesh, a town in India
- Regio Patalis, the region of Patala, derived from the ancient city of Patala at the mouth of the Indus River in Pakistan

== See also ==
- Padala (disambiguation)
- Patla (disambiguation)
- Patal (disambiguation)
- Pattalam (disambiguation)
- Pataal Bhairavi, 1985 Indian film
- Paatal Lok, Indian web series
