= Jaranwala railway station =

Railway station in Jaranwala, Pakistan

Jaranwala Railway Station جڑانوالا ریلوے اسٹیشن
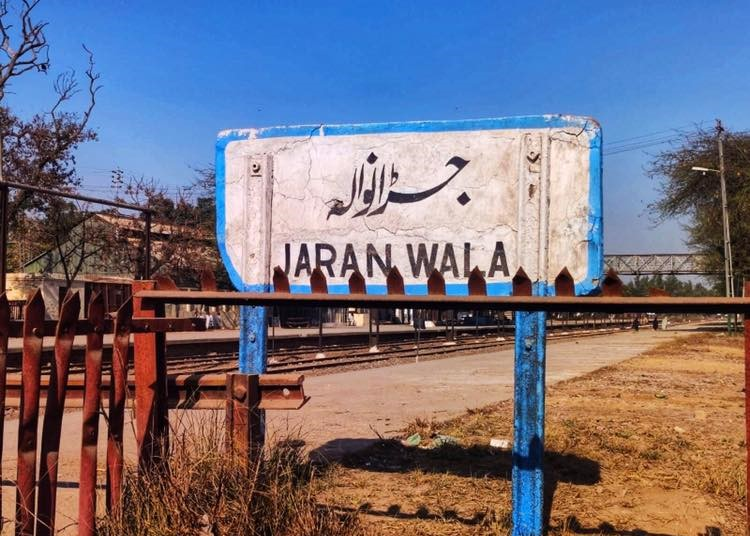

General information
- Coordinates: 31.3356°N 73.4248°E
- Owner: Ministry of Railways
- Line: Shorkot–Sheikhupura Branch Line

Construction
- Parking: Available
- Accessible: Available

Other information
- Station code: JNW

History
- Opened: 1907

Services
Preceding station	Pakistan Railways	Following station
Rurala Road towards Shorkot Cantonment Junction	Shorkot–Sheikhupura Branch Line	Buchiana towards Qila Sheikhupura Junction
Location

Jaranwala Railway Station (Urdu: جڑانوالا ریلوے اسٹیشن, Punjabi: جڑانوالا ریلوے اسٹیشن) is located in the town of Jaranwala, Faisalabad District, Pakistan on the Pakistan Railways Shorkot–Sheikhupura Branch Line. Jaranwala Railway Station was established in 1907. In 1926, a 22-mile (35 km) direct branch line—known as the 'Jaranwala-Lyallpur Branch Line'—was opened to connect Jaranwala directly with Lyallpur (present-day Faisalabad). However, during World War II in 1940, British authorities dismantled the tracks of this specific branch line so that the steel could be reused elsewhere for wartime defense efforts.

== Jaranwala–Lyallpur branch line ==
The Jaranwala–Lyallpur branch line was constructed between Jaranwala and Lyallpur (present-day Faisalabad), but it was later uprooted. Railway line land, bridges and railway stations between Jaranwala and Faisalabad still exist.

== See also ==
- List of railway stations in Pakistan
- Pakistan Railways
- Jaranwala-Lyallpur Branch Line
