= Buchiana railway station =

Railway station in Jaranwala Tehsil, Pakistan

Buchiana Railway Station بچیانہ ریلوے اسٹیشن

General information
- Coordinates: 31.4229°N 73.5595°E
- Owner: Ministry of Railways
- Line: Shorkot–Sheikhupura Branch Line

Other information
- Station code: BCX

Services
Preceding station	Pakistan Railways	Following station
Jaranwala towards Shorkot Cantonment Junction	Shorkot–Sheikhupura Branch Line	Nankana Sahib towards Qila Sheikhupura Junction
Location

Buchiana Railway Station (Urdu: بچیانہ ریلوے اسٹیشن) is a defunct railway station in Buchiana Mandi, Faisalabad District, Jaranwala Tehsil Pakistan.

== History ==
The station was part of the line on which a horse-drawn train used to run that was started by Sir Ganga Ram. The train was closed in 1980.

== See also ==
- List of railway stations in Pakistan
- Pakistan Railways
