= Jaranwala–Lyallpur Branch Line =

Railway line in Pakistan

Jaranwala–Lyallpur Branch Line (in Urdu جڑانوالہ-لائلپور ریلوے لائن ) was the one railway branch line constructed in 1926 from Jaranwala railway station to Lyallpur Faisalabad railway station 22 miles (35 km)

The branch line was uprooted in 1940 due to steel shortage in World War II.

== Stations ==
- Jaranwala
- Kot Nawaz
- Jhakka Ladhana
- Muhammadwala
- Nethri
- Faisalabad
