= Farooq Abad railway station =

Railway station in Pakistan

Farooq Abad Railway Station فاروق آباد ریلوے اسٹیشن
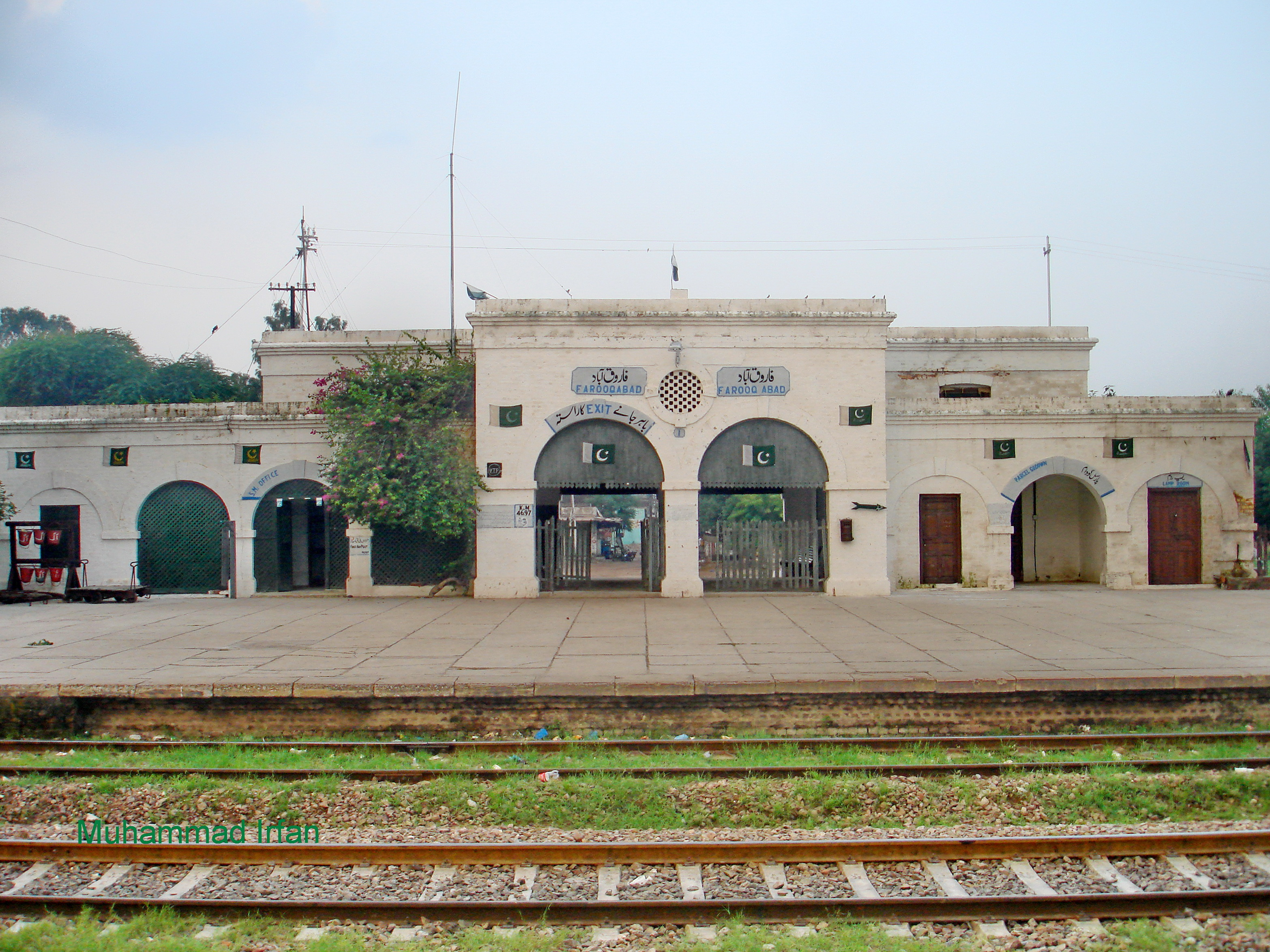
- Farooqabad City Railway Station

General information
- Coordinates: 31.7429°N 73.8319°E
- Owner: Ministry of Railways
- Line: Shahdara Bagh–Sangla Hill Branch Line

Other information
- Station code: FRQD

Services
Preceding station	Pakistan Railways	Following station
Qila Sheikhupura Junction towards Shahdara Bagh Junction	Shahdara Bagh–Sangla Hill Branch Line	Sachcha Sauda towards Sangla Hill Junction
Location

Farooq Abad Railway Station (Urdu: فاروق آباد ریلوے اسٹیشن, Punjabi: فاروق آباد ریلوے اسٹیشن) is located in Farooqabad, Sheikhupura District, Punjab, Pakistan.

== See also ==
- List of railway stations in Pakistan
- Pakistan Railways
