= Warburton (Pakistan) railway station =

Railway station in Pakistan

Warburton Railway Station واربرٹن ریلوے اسٹیشن

General information
- Coordinates: 31.5388°N 73.8267°E
- Owner: Ministry of Railways
- Line: Shorkot–Sheikhupura Branch Line

Other information
- Station code: WRN

Services
Preceding station	Pakistan Railways	Following station
Nankana Sahib towards Shorkot Cantonment Junction	Shorkot–Sheikhupura Branch Line	Qila Sheikhupura Junction Terminus
Location

Warburton Railway Station (Urdu: واربرٹن ریلوے اسٹیشن, Punjabi: واربرٹن ریلوے اسٹیشن) is located in the Nankana Sahib Tehsil, Sheikhupura District, Pakistan.

== See also ==
- List of railway stations in Pakistan
- Pakistan Railways
