= Qila Sattar Shah =

Village in Punjab, Pakistan

Coordinates: 31°41′N 74°09′E

Qila Sattar Shah (Urdu: قلعہ ستار شاہ) is a town located in the Ferozewala Tehsil of Sheikhupura District, Punjab, Pakistan.

It is served by Qila Sattar Shah railway station.
