= Kanjwani railway station =

Railway station in Pakistan

Kanjwani Railway Station کنجوانی ریلوے اسٹیشن

General information
- Coordinates: 30.9233°N 72.9609°E
- Owner: Ministry of Railways
- Line: Shorkot–Sheikhupura Branch Line

Other information
- Station code: KJK

Services
Preceding station	Pakistan Railways	Following station
Mamu Kanjan towards Shorkot Cantonment Junction	Shorkot–Sheikhupura Branch Line	Mandi Rahme Shah towards Qila Sheikhupura Junction
Location

Kanjwani Railway Station (Urdu: کنجوانی ریلوے اسٹیشن, Punjabi: کنجوانی ریلوے اسٹیشن) is a railway station in Tehsil Tandlianwala, Punjab, Pakistan.

== See also ==
- List of railway stations in Pakistan
- Pakistan Railways
