= Chak Turan Halt railway station =

Railway station in Pakistan

Coordinates: 31.075°N 73.190278°E

Chak Turan Halt Railway Station چک توران اسٹیشن

General information
- Owner: Ministry of Railways
- Line: Shorkot–Sheikhupura Branch Line

Other information
- Station code: CHTR
Location

Chak Turan Railway Halt (Urdu: چک توران ریلوے اسٹیشن) is a closed railway station located in Pakistan.

== See also ==
- List of railway stations in Pakistan
- Pakistan Railways
