= Patla =

Patla may refer to

== Places ==
- Patla, Kasaragod, a village in Kasaragod district, Kerala, India
- Patla railway station, Pakistan
- Patla, Puebla, a village in Puebla, Mexico; see Upper Necaxa Totonac
- Patla, a village in Puebla, Mexico; see Necaxa River

== People ==
- Adam Patla (1898–1977), Polish miner, geologist, World War II resistance fighter
- Angela Patla, Miss Pennsylvania USA, 2000
- Antoni Patla (1898–1977), Polish journalist, museologist, teacher, World War II resistance fighter
- Genowefa Patla (born 1962), Polish javelin thrower

== See also ==
- Patala (disambiguation)
