= Rurala Road =

Pakistani town

- Tehsil
- Rurala Road
- Nickname: Mandi
- Location within Pakistan
- Coordinates (Railroad Station): 31°12′0″N 73°18′0″E
- Country: Pakistan
- Province: Punjab

Government
  - MNA: Ahtisham Munawar
  - MPA: Molvi Hassaan
- Elevation: 592 ft (180 m)

Population
  - Total: 25,000
- Time zone: UTC+5 (PST)
  - Summer (DST): UTC+6 (PDT)
- Postal code: 37200
- Calling code: 041

Rurala Road (Urdu: روڑالہ روڈ) is a town situated in Faisalabad District, Punjab, Pakistan. It is 25 km from Jaranwala. Also referred to as Chak No. 283 GB, Rurala Road lies between Jaranwala and Tandlianwala tehsils.

== Government ==
Its Union Council number is 65. The chairman of the Union Council is Abdul Ghafoor Jappa and the Vice Chairman is Abdul Rehman who is advocate of high court.

== Infrastructure ==
It has a railway station, a bank (HBL), post office, bus stand, taxi stand and markets, as well as the offices of the Union Council, a government hospital and a veterinary hospital. Four private hospitals are there.

A large two-story mosque is nearby, Tehsil Jaranwala. It doubles as a trading post for nearby villages. Rurala Road was one of the busiest villages with the biggest bazaar in the area around Faisalabad in the late 1970s to '80s but due to migration into cities including Faisalabad and Lahore, its importance has diminished.

Four food storage godowns operate in Rurala Road, run by the Government of Punjab.

== Education ==
The schools in this town include:

- Government Boys High School 282 GB
- Government Girls High School
- Government Boys Primary School
- Mughal Public School
- Quality Educational Complex
- Jinnah Public School

== Transport ==
=== Bus ===
Rurala Road has bus connections to Faisalabad and Jaranwala.

=== Train ===
Rurala Road railway station is connected with Lahore (via Jaranwala, Sheikhupura) and with Shorkot (via Tandlianwala, Kamalia) by rail.

== Sports ==
=== Football ===
Usama Football Club is known at the national level. The town's other football clubs are Gafari Memorial Football Club. This Town has no proper football ground.

Each year, the Ghafari Memorial Football Tournament is held in the town to commemorate a local footballer.

=== Cricket ===
Each year, the Sharafat Amjad Waqar Memorial Cricket Tournament is held in the town to commemorate a local cricketer. Various cricket teams from Jaranwala tehsil participate in this tournament, which is well known in the area.

The town's cricket clubs are Ahtisham, Ravi, Young Generation Stars, Young Generation Heroes, Rising Stars Eleven, KS Cricket Eleven Young Star
