= Langowal Baruhi Halt railway station =

Railway station in Pakistan

Langowal Baruhi Halt Station لنگووال بروہی ہالٹ ریلوے اسٹیشن

General information
- Owner: Ministry of Railways
- Line: Shahdara Bagh–Sangla Hill Branch Line

Other information
- Station code: LBU

Services
Preceding station	Pakistan Railways	Following station
Momin towards Shahdara Bagh Junction	Shahdara Bagh–Sangla Hill Branch Line	Sangla Hill Junction Terminus
Location

Langowal Baruhi Halt railway station (Urdu: لنگووال بروہی ہالٹ ریلوے اسٹیشن, Punjabi: لنگووال بروہی ہالٹ ریلوے اسٹیشن) is located in Sheikhupura District, Pakistan.

== See also ==
- List of railway stations in Pakistan
- Pakistan Railways
