= Rachand =

Village and union council in Punjab, Pakistan

Rachand رچند
- Village and union council
- Location within Pakistan
- Coordinates: 31°47′47″N 73°44′05″E
- Country: Pakistan
- Province: Punjab
- Division: Lahore
- District: Sheikhupura
- Tehsil: Sheikhupura
- Thana: Farooqabad Saddar
- union council: Rachand

Rachand (Punjabi,Urdu: رچند), is a village & Union council in Sheikhupura District, Punjab, province Pakistan. it's part of Sheikhupura tehsil.

== Geography ==
Rachand is a village a distance of 07 km from Farooqabad on Khanqah Dogran Road and about 03 km inland from Chhota Sarkari. located at latitude 31.79627 and longitude 73.73485 with altitude of 252 meters nearby villages are Awan bhattian, Sarkari kallan, and Rodanwali M-2 motorway (Pakistan) routed near to village as well as nearby Railway station is Sachcha Sauda railway station is approximately 7.5 kilometres (4.7 mi).

== Education ==
- Govt community model high school for (Boys)
- Govt girls high school for (Girls)
