= Bahalike railway station =

Railway station in Punjab, Pakistan

Coordinates: 31.7387°N 73.6860°E

Bahalike Railway Station بہالیکے ریلوے اسٹیشن

General information
- Owner: Ministry of Railways
- Line: Shahdara Bagh–Sangla Hill Branch Line

Other information
- Station code: BKZ

Services
Preceding station	Pakistan Railways	Following station
Sachcha Sauda towards Shahdara Bagh Junction	Shahdara Bagh–Sangla Hill Branch Line	Nawan Pind Halt towards Sangla Hill Junction
Location

Bahalike Railway Station (Urdu: بہالیکے ریلوے اسٹیشن, Punjabi: بہالیکے ریلوے اسٹیشن) is located in Punjab, Pakistan.

== See also ==
- List of railway stations in Pakistan
- Pakistan Railways
