= Pattalam =

Pattalam may refer to:

- Pattalam, Chennai, a residential area in Chennai, Tamil Nadu, India
- Pattalam (2003 film), an Indian Malayalam-language film directed by Lal Jose
- Pattalam (2009 film), an Indian Tamil-language film directed by Rohan Krishna

== See also ==
- Patala (disambiguation)
- Pattalam Janaki, a 1977 Indian film
- Pattala, a Burmese xylophone
