= Patal, Fars =

Patal پاتل
- Village
- Country: Iran
- Province: Fars
- County: Sepidan
- Bakhsh: Hamaijan
- Rural District: Sornabad

Population (2006)
  - Total: 26
- Time zone: UTC+3:30 (IRST)
  - Summer (DST): UTC+4:30 (IRDT)

Patal (Persian: پاتل, also Romanized as Pātal) is a village in Sornabad Rural District, Hamaijan District, Sepidan County, Fars province, Iran. In the 2006 census, its population was 26, in the form of 8 families.
