= Safdarabad railway station =

Railway station in Pakistan

Safdarabad Railway Station صفدرآباد ریلوے اسٹیشن

General information
- Coordinates: 31.7318°N 73.5740°E
- Owner: Ministry of Railways
- Line: Shahdara Bagh–Sangla Hill Branch Line

Other information
- Station code: SFRD

Services
Preceding station	Pakistan Railways	Following station
Nawan Pind Halt towards Shahdara Bagh Junction	Shahdara Bagh–Sangla Hill Branch Line	Abdullahpur Kolar towards Sangla Hill Junction
Location

Safdarabad Railway Station (Urdu: صفدرآباد ریلوے اسٹیشن, Punjabi: صفدرآباد ریلوے اسٹیشن) is located in Safdarabad, Sheikhupura District, Pakistan.

== See also ==
- List of railway stations in Pakistan
- Pakistan Railways
