= Kot Darya Bal railway station =

Railway station in Pakistan

Coordinates: 30.787588°N 72.722783°E

General information
- Owner: Ministry of Railways

Other information
- Station code: KTDB

History
- Former names: Great Indian Peninsula Railway
Location

Kot Darya Bal railway station (Urdu: کوٹ دریا بل ریلوے اسٹیشن) is located in Pakistan.

== See also ==
- List of railway stations in Pakistan
- Pakistan Railways
