= Manjhla Bagh railway station =

Railway station in Pakistan

Coordinates: 30°53′N 72°53′E

General information
- Owner: Ministry of Railways

Other information
- Station code: MNLB

History
- Former names: Great Indian Peninsula Railway
Location

Manjhla Bagh railway station (Urdu: منجھلا باغ ریلوے اسٹیشن) is located in Pakistan.

== See also ==
- List of railway stations in Pakistan
- Pakistan Railways
