= Patal-e Isin =

Patal-e Isin پاتل ايسين
- Village
- Location within Iran
- Coordinates: 27°18′03″N 56°14′25″E
- Country: Iran
- Province: Hormozgan
- County: Bandar Abbas
- Bakhsh: Central
- Rural District: Isin

Population (2006)
  - Total: 1,318
- Time zone: UTC+3:30 (IRST)
  - Summer (DST): UTC+4:30 (IRDT)

Patal-e Isin (Persian: پاتل ايسين, also Romanized as Pātal-e Īsīn, Pā Tall-e Īsīn, and Pā-ye Tall-e Īsīn) is a village in Isin Rural District, in the Central District of Bandar Abbas County, Hormozgan Province, Iran. At the 2006 census, its population was 1,318, in 235 families.
