= Shahdara Bagh–Sangla Hill Branch Line =

Railway line in Pakistan

Overview
- Native name: شاہدرہ باغ-سانگلہ ہل برانچ لائن
- Owner: Pakistan Railways
- Termini: Shahdara Bagh Junction; Sangla Hill Junction
- Stations: 10

Service
- Operator: Pakistan Railways

History
- Opened: 17 December 1899

Technical
- Line length: 135 km (84 mi)
- Operating speed: 105 km/h (65 mph) (Current)

Shahdara Bagh–Sangla Hill Branch Line (Urdu: شاہدرہ باغ-سانگلہ ہل برانچ لائن) is one of several branch lines in Pakistan, operated and maintained by Pakistan Railways. The line begins from Shahdara Bagh Junction station and ends at Sangla Hill Junction station. The total length of this railway line is 135 kilometers (84 mi). There are 10 operational railway stations from Shahdara Bagh to Sangla Hill.

== Stations ==
The railway stations on this railway line are:

- Shahdara Bagh Junction
- Imamia Colony Halt (Abandoned)
- Missan Kalar
- Shakirabad Halt (Abandoned)
- Qila Sattar Shah
- Chichoki Mallian
- Qila Sheikhupura Junction
- Farooq Abad
- Sachcha Sauda (Abandoned)
- Bahalike
- Nawan Pind Virkan (Abandoned)
- Safdarabad
- Abdullahpur Kolar (Abandoned)
- Moman
- Langowal Baruhi Halt (Abandoned)
- Sangla Hill Junction
