= Bahrianwala railway station =

Railway station in Pakistan

Bahrianwala railway station بحرین والا ریلوے اسٹیشن

General information
- Coordinates: 31.652778°N 73.988889°E
- Owner: Ministry of Railways

Other information
- Station code: BZW
Location

Bahrianwala railway station (Urdu: بحرین والا ریلوے اسٹیشن) is located in Pakistan.

== See also ==
- List of railway stations in Pakistan
- Pakistan Railways
