= Mamukanjan =

Town in Faisalabad District

Coordinates: 30°50′N 72°48′E

Mamukanjan Mandi Mamoonkanjan, Mamu Kanjan
- Town
- ماموں کانجن
- Location within Punjab, Pakistan Location within Pakistan
- Country: Pakistan
- Province: Punjab
- District: Faisalabad; Tandlianwala

Area
  - Total: 20 km^{2} (7.7 sq mi)
- Elevation: 183 m (600 ft)

Population (2023)
  - Total: 40,249
- Time zone: UTC+5 (PST)
- ZIP code(s): 37000
- Calling code: 041

Mamu Kanjan (also spelled Mamukanjan) is a town of Tandlianwala Tehsil in Faisalabad District, Punjab, Pakistan.

It was once known as Sandianwala. Later its name was changed to the name of the saint Peer Mamu Kanjan, whose tomb is located at Bangla Road.

There is Bangla Chowk wherefrom five roads lead: Kamalia road, Tandlianwala road, Muridwala road, Kilianwala-Sahiwal road and Bullay Shah road.

The main crops grown in this area include watermelon, sugarcane, wheat, corn, and rice.

== Education ==
Mamu Kanjan has a range of public and private educational institutions serving students from primary to higher secondary levels. Notable schools include Dar-e-Arqam School, Allied School, Educators School, Quaid public higher secondary school, The Arqam School, City Grammar School, and Mahmood Nursery School. There is also a private institute called Union Science Academy. The area also has two public degree colleges: Government Degree College for Women, Mamu Kanjan and Government Degree College for Boys, Mamu Kanjan along with several private colleges, such as Oxford College Mamu Kanjan, Islamia Model College Mamu Kanjan, Colonel Abdul Rasheed School & College, and Apex Group of Colleges.

In addition, there is a Vocational Training Institute (VTI) established by the Punjab Vocational Training Council (PVTC), which aims to alleviate poverty by providing employable skills in various trades to the underprivileged youth of Mamu Kanjan, including both male and female students.

== Health and social welfare ==
Mamu Kanjan has several healthcare facilities serving the local population. While a government hospital operates in the area, most residents rely on private healthcare services. The most notable private hospitals and clinics include Ayesha Amir Memorial Hospital, Ibrahim Hospital, Baba Farid Hospital, and Adil Medical Center.

The town also hosts charitable organizations such as the Al-Hussainia Foundation, located at Bangla Chowk. Founded by members of the Rind family, the foundation focuses on humanitarian efforts, including orphan support, food distribution, and medical assistance for the local community.

== Mamu Kanjan railway station ==
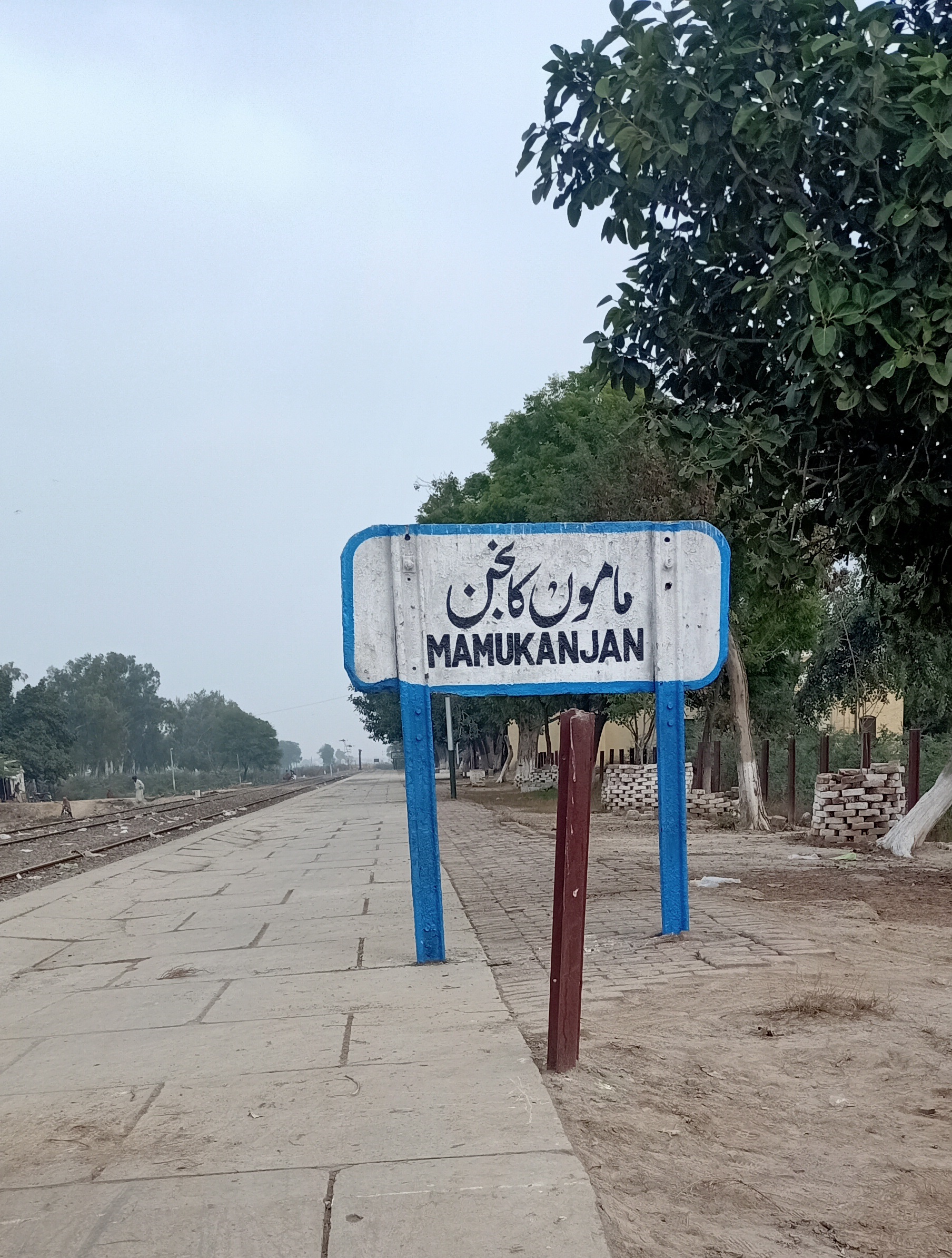

Mamu Kanjan railway station (Urdu: مامُوں کانجن ریلوے اسٹیشن, Punjabi: مامُوں کانجن ریلوے اسٹیشن) is located in Mamu Kanjan.
