= Imamia Colony railway station =

Railway station

General information
- Coordinates: 31.6498°N 74.2807°E
- Owner: Ministry of Railways
- Line: Lahore - Peshawar Main Line
- Platforms: No.
- Tracks: single
- Connections: closed

Construction
- Structure type: Demolished
- Parking: No.

Other information
- Station code: IMNY

History
- Former names: Great Indian Peninsula Railway
Location

Imamia Colony railway station (Urdu: امامیہ کالونی ریلوے اسٹیشن) is located in Imamia Colony Ferozewala, Sheikhupura District, Pakistan.

== See also ==
- List of railway stations in Pakistan
- Pakistan Railways
