= Tufail Shahid Halt railway station =

Railway station in Punjab, Pakistan

General information
- Owner: Ministry of Railways

Other information
- Station code: TESD

History
- Former names: Great Indian Peninsula Railway

Tufail Shahid Halt railway station (Urdu: طفیل شہید ہالٹ ریلوے اسٹیشن) is located in Punjab, Pakistan.

== See also ==
- List of railway stations in Pakistan
- Pakistan Railways
