= Patal, Hormozgan =

Patal پاتل
- Village
- Location within Iran
- Coordinates: 26°51′20″N 57°03′47″E
- Country: Iran
- Province: Hormozgan
- County: Minab
- Bakhsh: Byaban
- Rural District: Bemani

Population (2006)
  - Total: 236
- Time zone: UTC+3:30 (IRST)
  - Summer (DST): UTC+4:30 (IRDT)

Patal (Persian: پاتل, also Romanized as Pātal) is a village in Bemani Rural District, Byaban District, Minab County, Hormozgan Province, Iran. At the 2006 census, its population was 236, in 38 families.
