= Magneja railway station =

Railway station in Pakistan

General information
- Coordinates: 30.7391°N 72.5209°E
- Owner: Ministry of Railways

Other information
- Station code: MGNJ

History
- Former names: Great Indian Peninsula Railway
Location

Magneja railway station (Urdu: مگنیجا ریلوے اسٹیشن) is located in Pakistan.

== See also ==
- List of railway stations in Pakistan
- Pakistan Railways
