= Bahuman railway station =

Railway station in Pakistan

Bahuman Railway Station بحومان ریلوے اسٹیشن

General information
- Owner: Ministry of Railways

Other information
- Station code: BHMN
Location

Bahuman Railway Station (Urdu: بحومان ریلوے اسٹیشن) is located in Pakistan.

== See also ==
- List of railway stations in Pakistan
- Pakistan Railways
