= Vakilwala railway station =

Railway station in Pakistan

Vakilwala Railway Station

General information
- Coordinates: 31.4904°N 73.7582°E
- Owner: Ministry of Railways

Other information
- Station code: VKW

History
- Former names: Great Indian Peninsula Railway
Location

Vakilwala Railway Station (Urdu: وکیل والا ریلوے اسٹیشن) is located in Pakistan.

== See also ==
- List of railway stations in Pakistan
- Pakistan Railways
