= Patla railway station =

Railway station in Pakistan

Coordinates: 31.265278°N 73.363889°E

General information
- Owner: Ministry of Railways

Other information
- Station code: PTLA

History
- Former names: Great Indian Peninsula Railway
Location

Patla railway station (Urdu: پتلا ریلوے اسٹیشن) is located in Pakistan. The estimate terrain elevation above sea level is 187 meters.

== See also ==
- List of railway stations in Pakistan
- Pakistan Railways
