= Faisalabad railway station =

Railway station in Pakistan

Faisalabad Railway Station فیصل آباد ریلوے سٹیشن
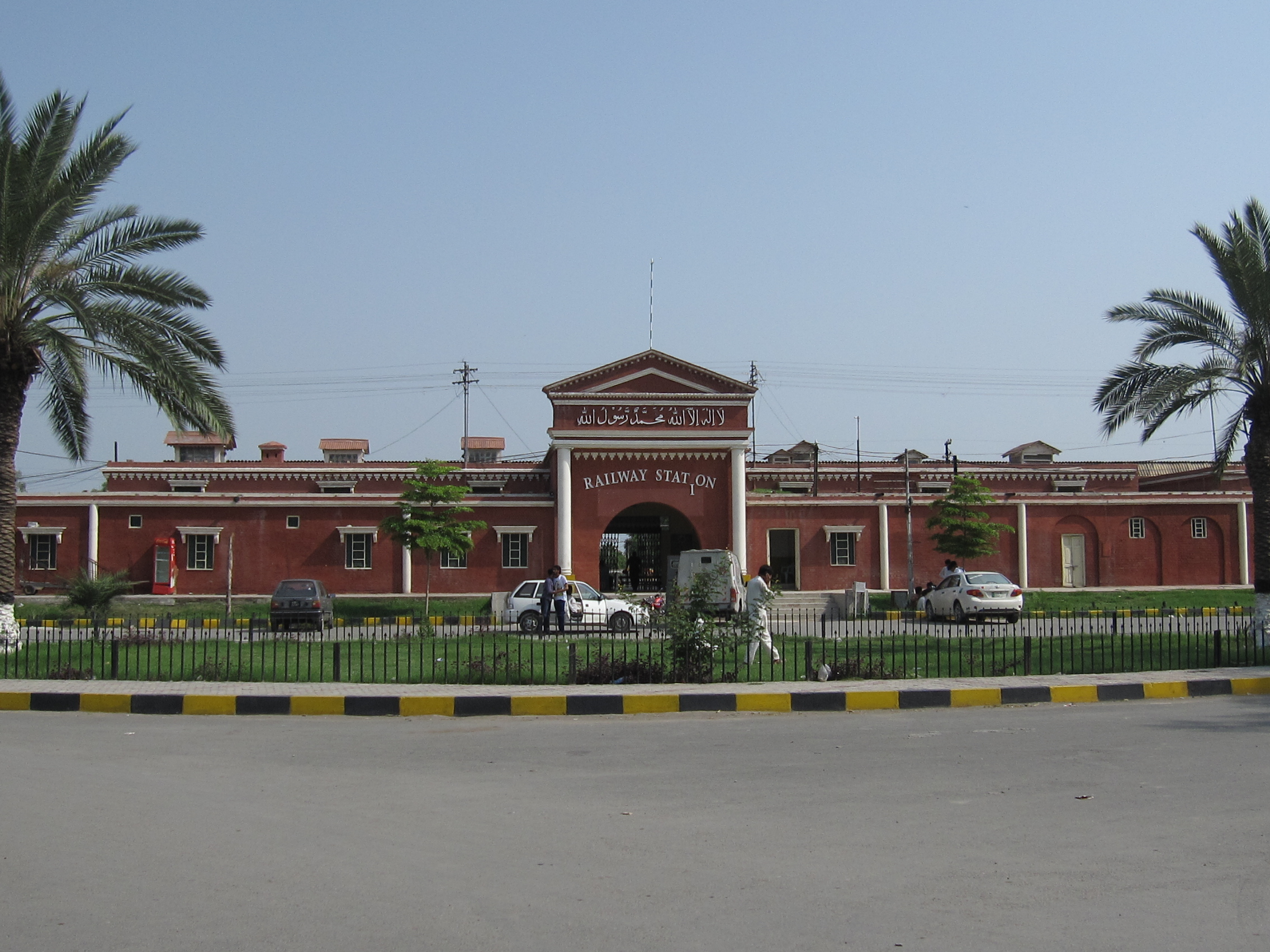
- Main entrance

General information
- Location: Rajbah Road; Faisalabad City, Faisalabad; Punjab; Pakistan
- Coordinates: 31°25′02″N 73°05′48″E
- System: Public
- Owner: Government of Pakistan
- Operator: Ministry of Railways
- Line: Khanewal-Wazirabad Branch Line
- Platforms: 7
- Connections: Bus stand, taxicab stand

Construction
- Structure type: Standard (on ground station)
- Platform levels: 3
- Parking: Paid Parking Available
- Cycle facilities: Paid Parking Available
- Accessible: Yes

Other information
- Station code: FSLD

History
- Opened: 1896
- Former names: Lyallpur Railway Station

Passengers
- 0.5 million

Services
| Preceding station | Pakistan Railways | Following station |
|---|---|---|
| Samanabad towards Khanewal Junction | Khanewal–Wazirabad Branch Line | Nishatabad towards Wazirabad Junction |
- Computerized Ticketing Counters Luggage Checking System Parking Disabled Access Food Plaza Kiosks WC Taxi Stand Public Transportation Metro interchange
Location

Faisalabad Railway Station (Urdu: فيصل آباد ریلوے اسٹیشن, Punjabi: فيصل آباد ریلوے اسٹیشن) is located in Faisalabad city (formerly Lyallpur), in central Punjab, Pakistan, on the Khanewal-Wazirabad Branch Line. The station serves as the main train line hub for Faisalabad and grants rail access to Karachi, Lahore, Rawalpindi, Islamabad, Quetta, and Peshawar via direct routes. The Assistant Operation Officer (AOO), of the Faisalabad region of Pakistan Railways is the highest ranking officer at the station. The administrative office is located in the station building.

== History ==
Faisalabad Railway Station was founded during the British Raj in India in 1896.

There was railway line between Jaranwala and Faisalabad pre-1926. The Jaranwala-Lyallpur Branch Line railway stations and railway track land still existed.

== Facilities ==
The Faisalabad railway station has all the basic facilities, including a parking lot; current- and advance-reservation offices for ticket purchases; food, drink, sheds and charging points on the platforms. The station also houses cargo and parcel services.

=== Booking and Ticketing ===
The booking and ticketing area lies in the northern building of the railway station. There are separate counters for premium classes and 2nd class. Computerized ticketing is available at all stations.

=== Waiting Halls ===
Waiting halls are also located in the northern building of railway station complex. A common waiting area serves all 2nd class passengers, and a separate air conditioned waiting hall exists for premium class passengers.

=== Cargo Services ===
Faisalabad Railway Station also provides facilities to the people to book non-industrial cargo at the station. This facility includes cargo booking and delivery, and is situated in the northwest building of the railway station complex. There are many small cargo vendors located in close proximity to the station. Cargo dispatchers offer services all across Pakistan and fast links to Port Qasim, Karachi.

=== Admin Offices ===
The admin offices include management offices for the Faisalabad railway station and region, railway police and security, station master and other administrative services. The offices are located in the southern building of the railway station.

=== Platforms ===
Faisalabad railway station serves the passenger trains through five platforms. Two additional platforms are exclusively for maintenance and services of locomotives and bogies.

== Gallery ==
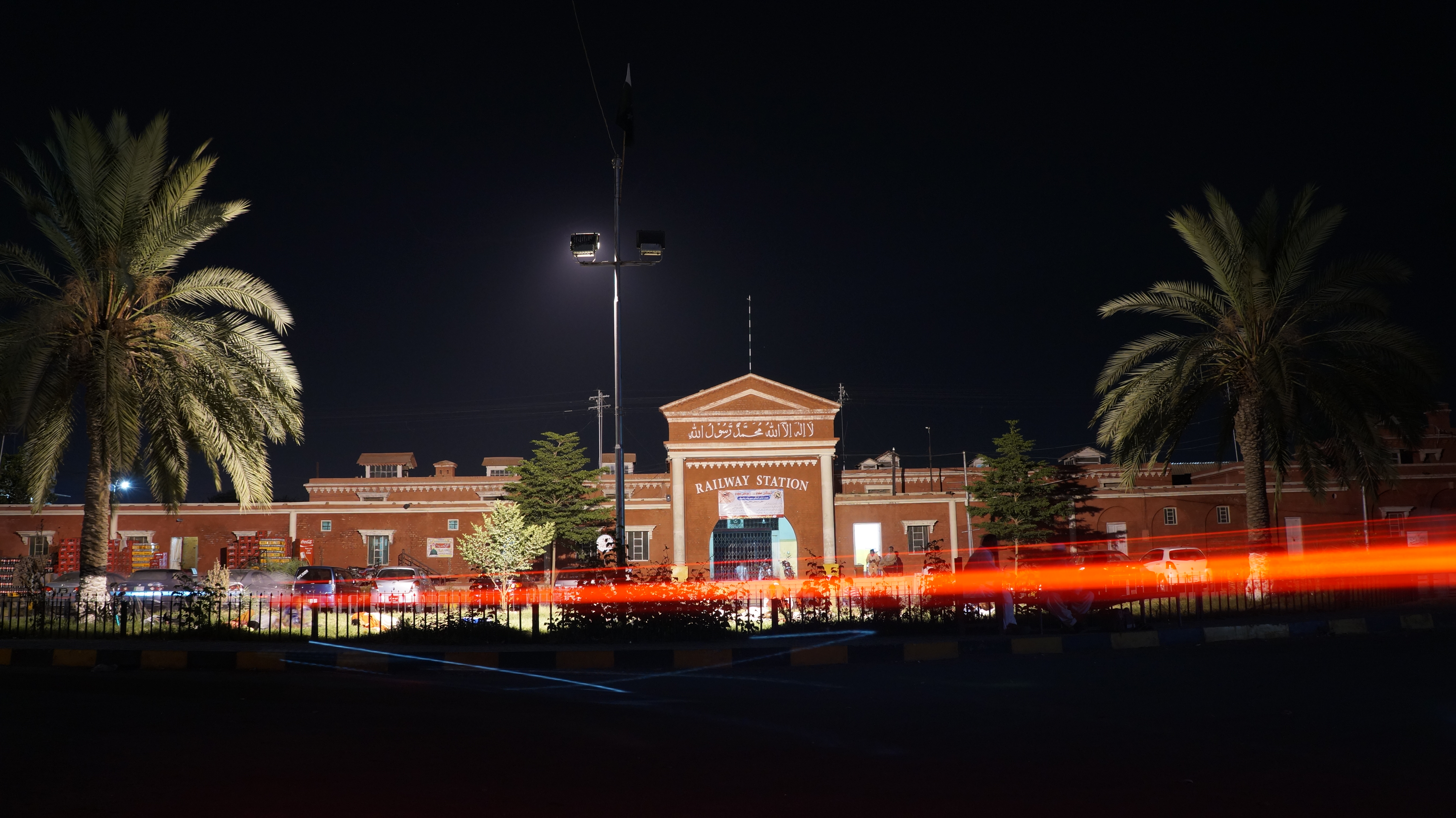
Faisalabad Railway Station at night

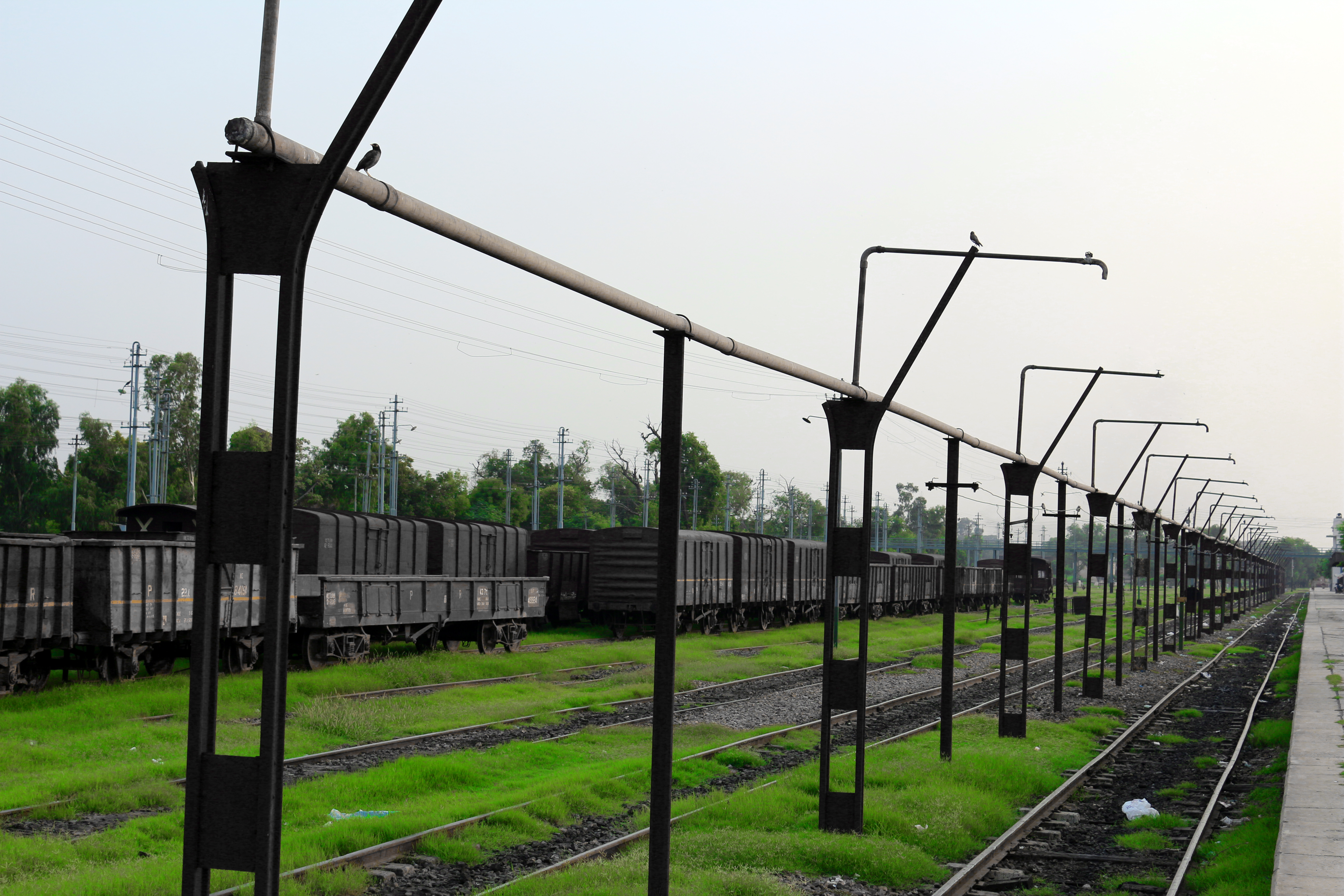
Old Main Platform

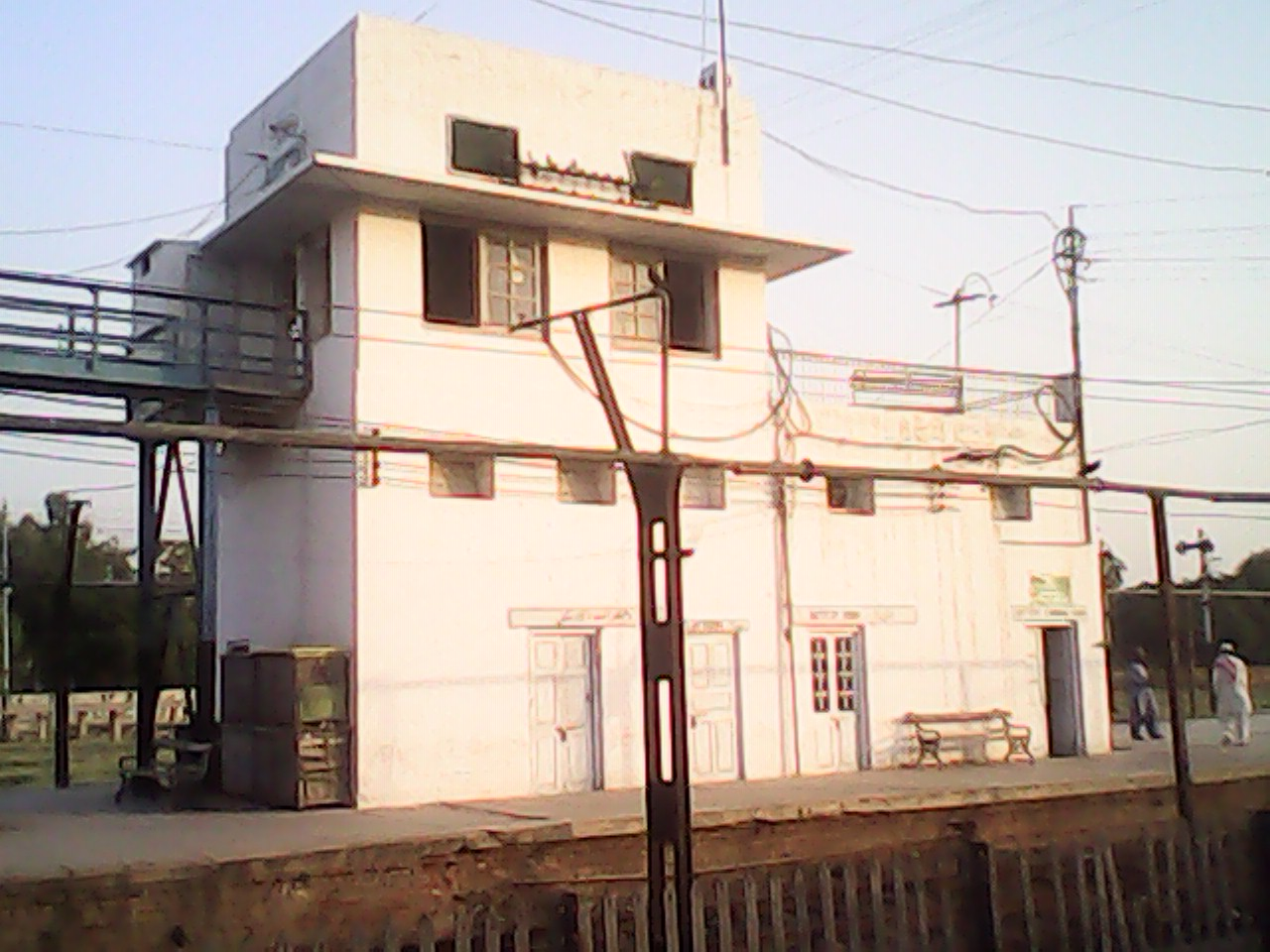
Old Control Tower

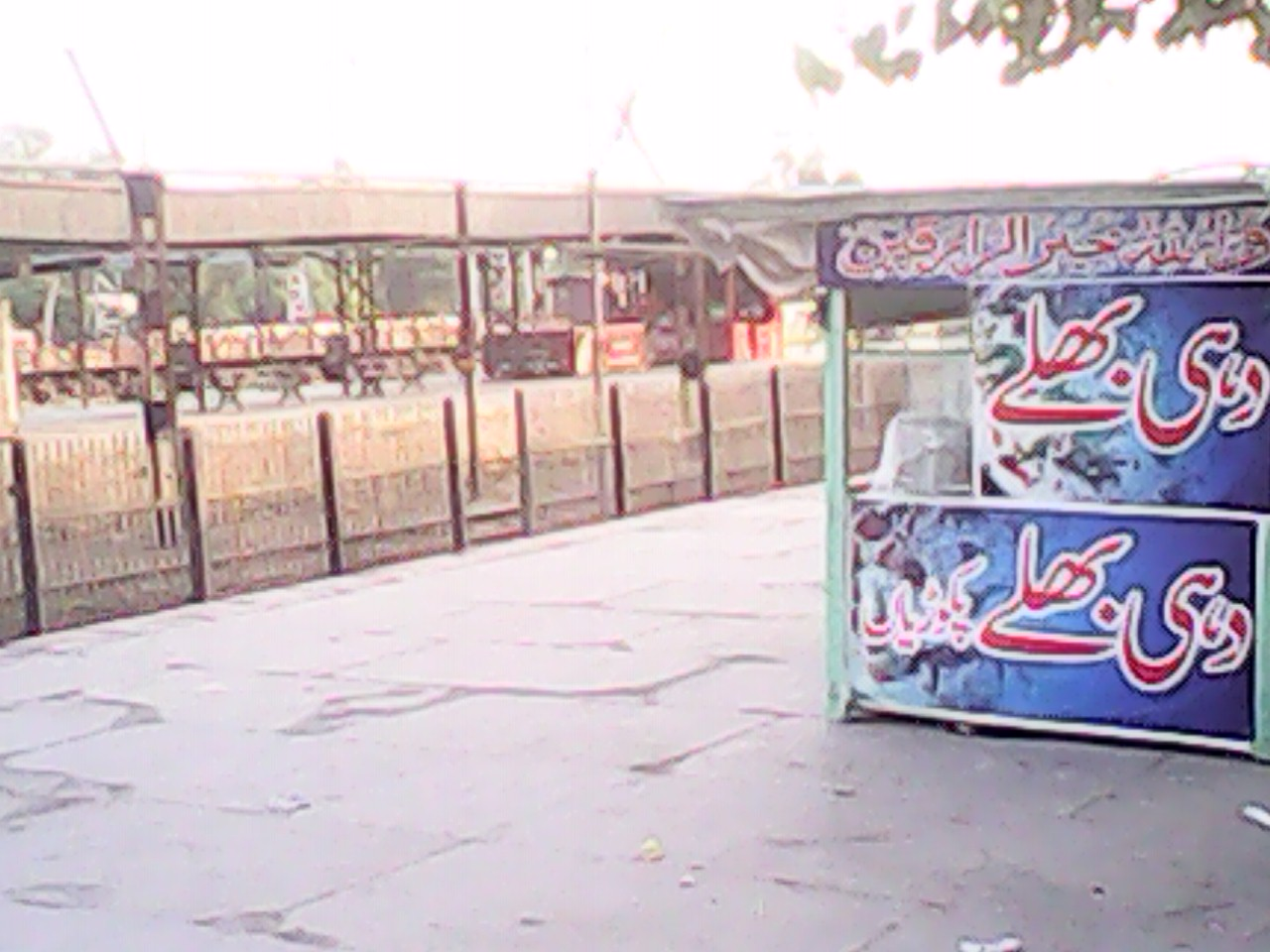
Canteen Stall

== See also ==
- List of railway stations in Pakistan
- Jaranwala-Lyallpur Branch Line
- Pakistan Railways
- Faisalabad
- Faisalabad International Airport
- Lahore
- Punjab (Pakistan)
- Pakistan
