= Tandlianwala =

Pakistani town

- City
- تاندلیانوالہ
- Nickname: TLW
- Location within Punjab, Pakistan Location within Pakistan
- Coordinates: 31°1′56″N 73°7′59″E
- Country: Pakistan
- Province: Punjab
- District: Faisalabad

Government
  - Type: Municipal Committee
  - Assistant commissioner: Rana Aurangzeb
  - MNA (NA-97): None (vacant)
  - MPA (PP-101 Faisalabad-V): None (vacant)

Area
  - Total: 1,351 km^{2} (522 sq mi)
- Elevation: 183 m (600 ft)

Population (2023)
  - Total: 49,680
  - Density: 600/km^{2} (1,600/sq mi)
- Time zone: UTC+5 (PST)
- ZIP code(s): 37150
- Calling code: 041

Tandlianwala (Urdu: تاندلیانوالہ) is a town in Punjab, Pakistan and the headquarters of Tandlianwala Tehsil. It is named after a medicinal plant called "Tandla"(digera arvensis) which was abundant near this town. It is located 40 km from the city of Faisalabad and 45 km from Okara. It is a sub-division of Faisalabad District and has a Tehsil municipal administration (TMA).

== History ==
The town was established as a Bazar (Market) during the colonization of west Punjab. In 1987, it received the status of sub-tehsil when Manzoor Wattoo was elected as MPA from the constituency and later became the CM Punjab. The town committee came into being in 1965. From 1966 to 1990, the town expanded rapidly due to the construction of a bridge over the Ravi River. It is also a ghee supplier mandi and chamra (leather) mandi since 1979. There were also factories for processing raw hides. Before the independence of Pakistan, the city was a food supplier for Faisalabad District and nearby areas. The original name of the city is Tandla Mandi (Tandla Market). Lately, the tehsil has been linked directly to Sahiwal city by a newly formed bridge on river Ravi. The motorway (Lahore to Karachi) which is part of CPEC Tandlianwala Tehsil came in contact with .

== Geography ==
Tandlianwala lies in the rolling flat plains of northeast Punjab, between longitude 73°13 East, latitude 30°03 North, with an elevation of 183 metres (600 ft) above sea level. The proper city covers an area of approximately 40 square kilometres (15 sq mi), while the tehsil covers more than 1,280 square kilometres (490 sq mi). The Ravi River flows about 9 km in the east which is the main source of irrigation meeting the requirements of 90% of cultivated land.

There are no natural boundaries between Tandlianwala and adjoining tehsils and districts. The city is bound on the north by Faisalabad, on the east by Okara, on the south by Sahiwal and Toba Tek Singh and on the west by Samundri.

=== Geology ===
Tandlianwala Tehsil is part of the alluvial plains between the Himalayan foothills and the central core of the Indian subcontinent. The alluvial deposits are typically over 1000 thick. The scalloped interfluves are believed to have been formed during the Late Pleistocene and feature flat-topped river terraces. These were later identified as old and young floodplains of the River Ravi on the Kamalia and Chenab Plains. The old floodplains consist of Holocene deposits from the River Ravi. There is also a small river passing through the center of the city.

The soil consists of young stratified silt loams or very fine sand loams which give the subsoil a very weak structure with common kankers at only five feet. The course of the rivers within Tandlianwala are winding and often subject to frequent alterations. In the rainy season, the currents are very strong. This leads to high floods in certain areas which last for a number of days. The Rakh and Gogera canals have encouraged the water levels in the district however the belt on the river Ravi has remained narrow. The river bed includes the river channels which have shifted the sand bars and low sandy levees leading to river erosion.

== Demographics ==
Population

Historical population
Year	Pop.	±%
1972	16,075	—
1981	24,324	+51.3%
1998	34,584	+42.2%
2017	47,452	+37.2%
2023	49,680	+4.7%

According to official 2023 census results, the population of Tandlianwala city is 49,680.

Before the partition there was a majority of Sikhs and Hindus in the city, then migrated to India, while settlements of Muslim refugees from East Punjab and Haryana who came from India. There are two other urban localities in Tandlianwala Municipal Committee: Mamukanjan and Kanjwani. The town has 28 union councils, three of which are urban and 25 rural.

There is a Police Chowki and Police Station in the city which was established in 1905 by the British covering an area of 680 sq. kilometres. There are four police stations: City Tandlianwala, Sadar Tandlianwala, Police Station Garh and Police Station Bahlak Thana.

=== Religion and ethnic groups ===
The majority religion is Islam, making up 98.0% of the city with small minorities of Christians (1.8%) and others (0.2%), mainly Sikhs and Ahmadis. The majority of Muslims belong to Sunni, Hanafi, and Barelvi schools of thought with a minority of Shiites. The major castes of Tehsil are Baloch and Wattoo which are the main political forces of the area too. Hence, the politics here revolves around the caste and clan patronage. The castes in the city and villages are: Kharal , Mahar Sipra Arain, Gujjar, Syed, Jatt, Wattoo, Awaan, Baloch, Sipra, Bhatti, Bhutta, Chishti, Gill, Jalahe, Khichi, Khokhar, Kumhar, Lodhi, Malik, Maachhi, Mirasi, Randhawa (Jatts), Paracha, Dhobi, Qasayi, Qureshi, Rajput, Rana, Rao, Rawal, Sheikh, Sherazi, Sial, Sahmal (Jatts), Tiwana, Toor, Warraich (Jatts), Sudrech and others.

=== Climate ===
Tandlianwala has a hot desert climate (BWh) in the Köppen-Geiger classification. The climate of the city and tehsil can see extremes, with a summer maximum temperature 50 °C (122 °F) and a winter temperature of −2 °C (28 °F). The mean maximum and minimum temperature in summer are 39 °C (102 °F) and 27 °C (81 °F) respectively. In winter it peaks at around 17 °C (63 °F) and 6 °C (43 °F) respectively.

The summer season starts from April and continues until October. May, June and July are the hottest months. The winter season starts from November and continues until March. December, January and February are the coldest months. The average yearly rainfall lies only at about 400 mm (16 in) and is highly seasonal, with approximately half of the yearly rainfall in the two months July and August.

Climate data for Tandlianwala
Month	Jan	Feb	Mar	Apr	May	Jun	Jul	Aug	Sep	Oct	Nov	Dec	Year
Mean daily maximum °C (°F)	19.4 (66.9)	22.4 (72.3)	27.3 (81.1)	33.8 (92.8)	49.3 (120.7)	49.9 (121.8)	45.3 (113.5)	44.3 (111.7)	40 (104)	33.6 (92.5)	27.5 (81.5)	21.8 (71.2)	34.6 (94.2)
Daily mean °C (°F)	11.9 (53.4)	14.9 (58.8)	19.9 (67.8)	25.9 (78.6)	31.1 (88.0)	34 (93)	32.3 (90.1)	31.6 (88.9)	30.1 (86.2)	25.6 (78.1)	18.9 (66.0)	13.7 (56.7)	24.2 (75.5)
Mean daily minimum °C (°F)	4.4 (39.9)	7.4 (45.3)	12.6 (54.7)	18.1 (64.6)	23.3 (73.9)	27.4 (81.3)	27.4 (81.3)	26.9 (80.4)	24.2 (75.6)	17.6 (63.7)	10.4 (50.7)	5.7 (42.3)	17.1 (62.8)
Average precipitation mm (inches)	14 (0.6)	15 (0.6)	21 (0.8)	14 (0.6)	13 (0.5)	56 (2.2)	132 (5.2)	115 (4.5)	43 (1.7)	6 (0.2)	3 (0.1)	8 (0.3)	440 (17.3)
Source: Climate-Data.org, altitude: 183m

== Sports ==
Tandlianwala has many popular sports like cricket, football and volleyball, akbaddi, wrestling (Kushti), badminton, table tennis, marshall arts and local desi games. The boys of Tandlianwala city play cricket in the evenings, mostly on the grounds of MC High School ground, the Doonga Ground and newly built cricket stadium.

The towns cricket stadium is newly built which has good national standards. There is also a sports complex which contains many indoor sports arenas. The badminton court is also available in the front of the municipal library.

== Agriculture ==
The town is also well known because of the high quality of sugarcane. It has two sugar mills and a dozen of cotton factories, rice factories and flour mills. The city is traditionally known for pure Desi Ghee, though it is rare now.

The people of this city took an active part in the struggle for independence of Pakistan (Freedom Movement). The city was originally developed around a grain market. Its police station was established as early as 1905 and prior to that only a police checkpost existed.

Politically, it is the most important Tehsil of Faisalabad District. Mian Manzoor Wattoo, the former chief minister of Punjab was elected from this constituency in 1993, while he lost in his home constituency.

The name of the city comes from a herb "Tandla", which was grown in abundance.

== Economics ==
Tandlianwala is home to a major grain, whole corn and sugar market, and it was popular for Chrma Mandi which were started by the late Haji Ghulam Muhammad Paracha Mahoon, and now run by his sons Haji Bashir Ahmad and Shabbir Aad Paracha. Mahi chowk is the main commercial market of the city and also known for a dessert Mannpasand. Other markets in the city include Ghala Mandi, Chamra Mandi Mohallah Shamspura Street No. 4, Rail Bazar, Nehar Bazar, Naya Bazar, Anarkali Bazar, Quaid-e-Azam Road, (Samundri Road) and Faisalabad Road.

Major banks and offices in Tandlianwala:

1. National Bank of Pakistan
2. Bank of Punjab
3. Zarai Taraqiati Bank Limited
4. Habib Bank Limited
5. Allied Bank Limited
6. MCB Bank Limited
7. United Bank Limited
8. TCS Pvt Limited

== Healthcare ==
A 40-bed modern Tehsil Headquarters Hospital, Tandlianwala became functional in March 2021.

== Transport ==
- Tandliawala railway station is present which connects city to other cities. City also has a Lorry Adda (Bus Terminal) which has buses which operates to nearby cities. Tandla has another transport facility, Taimoor Terminal which majorly connect Faisalabad and Okara to the city via vans. Now, this terminal also has facility of skyways bus service to RWP/ISB and also to Lahore via new motorway.

== Notable places ==
=== Major sites ===
The city has a number of sites of interest including several colonial-era buildings, a couple of Hindu Mandir (temple), some Sikh gurudwara, two major sports stadium (one under construction) and a public park.

- Tandlianwala Mahi Chowk
- Haji Bakhtawar Ali Khourana Road
- MUBARAK Pura THQ Road
- Tandlianwala Railway Station
- Bilal Shaheed Park
- Dunga Ground, Cricket and Hockey Stadium
- Faisalabad Hockey Stadium
- Tandlianwala Library
- Punjab College, under construction 1 km from city on Faisalabad Road
- Jamia Umme Salmah Lil-Banat

=== Localities ===
- Hoche
- Mubarak Pura
- Iqbal Colony
- Hussain Abad
- Kachcha Tandla
- Sarwar Colony
- Rasool Pura
- Shammas Pura
- Raza Abad
- Mumtaz Abad
- Islam Pura
- Jinnah Colony
- Colony
- Jalla Mor
- Taiba Town
- Nishat Town
