= Sangla Hill Junction railway station =

Railway station in Punjab, Pakistan

Sangla Hill Junction Station سانگلہ ہل جنکشن اسٹیشن
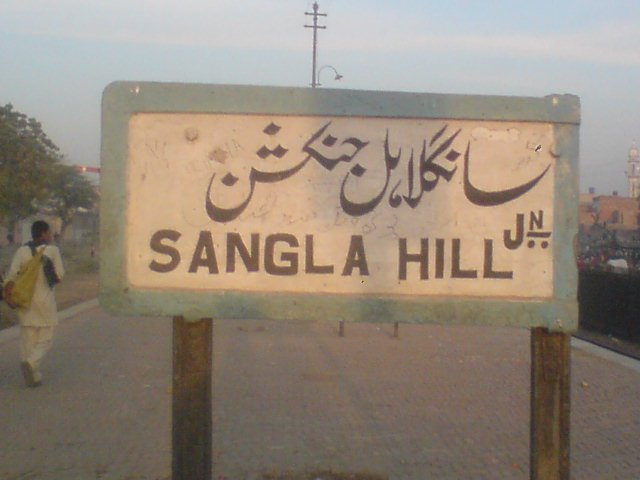
- Railway Sangla Hill

General information
- Location: Railway Station Road; Sangla Hill, Punjab 39600; Pakistan
- Coordinates: 31.7171°N 73.3754°E
- Owner: Ministry of Railways
- Lines: Khanewal–Wazirabad Branch Line; Shahdara Bagh–Sangla Hill Branch Line; Sangla Hill–Kundian Branch Line

Construction
- Parking: Available
- Accessible: Available

Other information
- Station code: SLL

History
- Opened: 1896

Services
Preceding station	Pakistan Railways	Following station
Dar ul Ihsan towards Khanewal Junction	Khanewal–Wazirabad Branch Line	Marh Balochan towards Wazirabad Junction
Langowal Baruhi Halt towards Shahdara Bagh Junction	Shahdara Bagh–Sangla Hill Branch Line	Terminus
Terminus	Sangla Hill–Kundian Branch Line	Dar ul Ihsan towards Kundian Junction
Location

Sangla Hill Junction Railway Station (Urdu: سانگلہ ہل جنکشن ریلوے اسٹیشن, Punjabi: سانگلہ ہل جنکشن ریلوے اسٹیشن) is located at 214 km on Khanewal-Wazirabad Branch Line in the Sangla Hill town in Nankana Sahib District, Punjab, Pakistan. The station serves as a junction between the Shahdara Bagh–Sangla Hill Branch Line, Khanewal–Wazirabad Branch Line and Sangla Hill–Kundian Branch Line.

== Facilities ==
The station has a police help center, has waiting tables and also has water arrangements. There are 3 active platforms at Sangla Hill Junction. There is also a Parcel house to distribute any mail coming to the junction.

== Services ==
The routes from Sangla Hill are linked to Karachi, Lahore, Rawalpindi, Hafizabad, Alipur Chatta, Wazirabad Jn, Gujrat, Lala Musa Jn, Jhelum, Multan, Faisalabad, Gojra, Toba Tek Singh, Shorkot Cantt Jn, Hyderabad, Bahawalpur, Rohri and Nawabshah. Major trains that stop here include 45Up/46Dn Pakistan Express, 35Up/36Dn Sir Syed Express (currently not operational), 47Up/48Dn Rehman Baba Express, 111Up/112Dn Badar Express, 147Up/148Dn Mianwali Express and 113Up/114Dn Ghouri Express. In past Rail Car Express, Abaseen Express, Chiltan Express, Shaheen Express used to stop here but these trains are not operating for a long time now.

== See also ==
- List of railway stations in Pakistan
- Pakistan Railways
