= Qila Sheikhupura Junction railway station =

Railway station in Pakistan

Qila Sheikhupura Junction Railway Station قِلعہ شیخُوپُورہ جنکشن ریلوے اسٹیشن
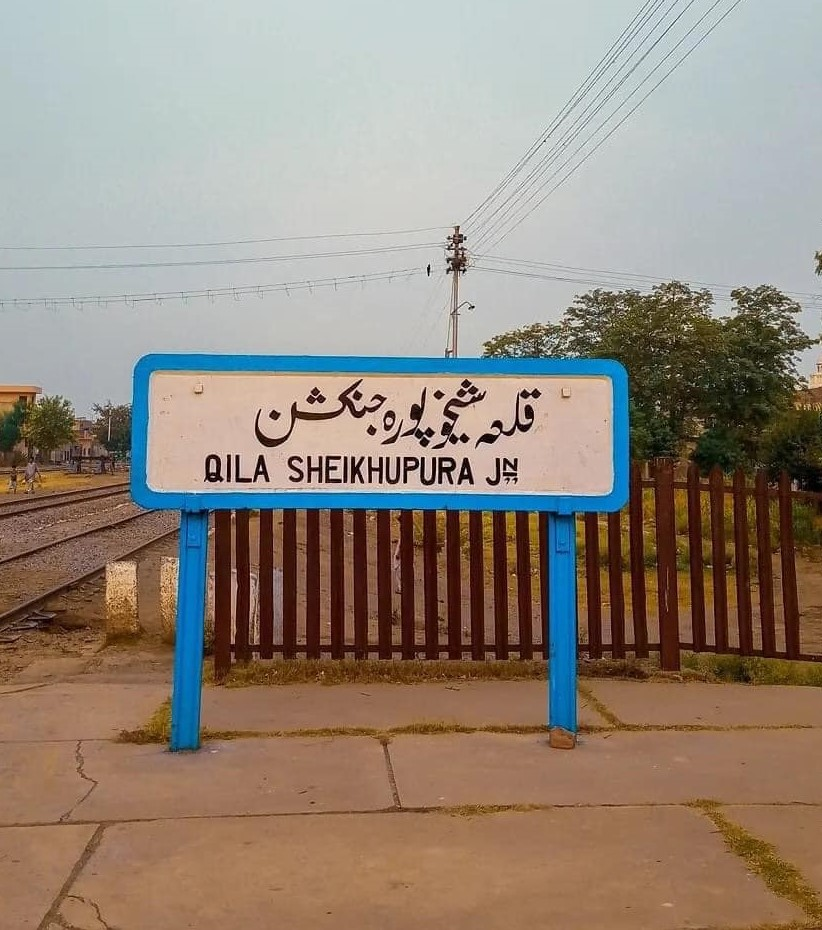

General information
- Coordinates: 31.7180°N 73.9788°E
- Owner: Ministry of Railways
- Lines: Shahdara Bagh–Sangla Hill Branch Line; Shorkot–Sheikhupura Branch Line

Construction
- Parking: Available
- Accessible: Available

Other information
- Station code: QSP

History
- Opened: 1907

Services
Preceding station	Pakistan Railways	Following station
Chichoki Mallian towards Shahdara Bagh Junction	Shahdara Bagh–Sangla Hill Branch Line	Farooq Abad towards Sangla Hill Junction
Warburton towards Shorkot Cantonment Junction	Shorkot–Sheikhupura Branch Line	Terminus
Location

Qila Sheikhupura Junction Railway Station (Urdu: قِلعہ شیخُوپُورہ جنکشن ریلوے اسٹیشن, Punjabi: قِلعہ شیخُوپُورہ جنکشن ریلوے اسٹیشن) is in Sheikhupura, Punjab, Pakistan.

== Gallery ==
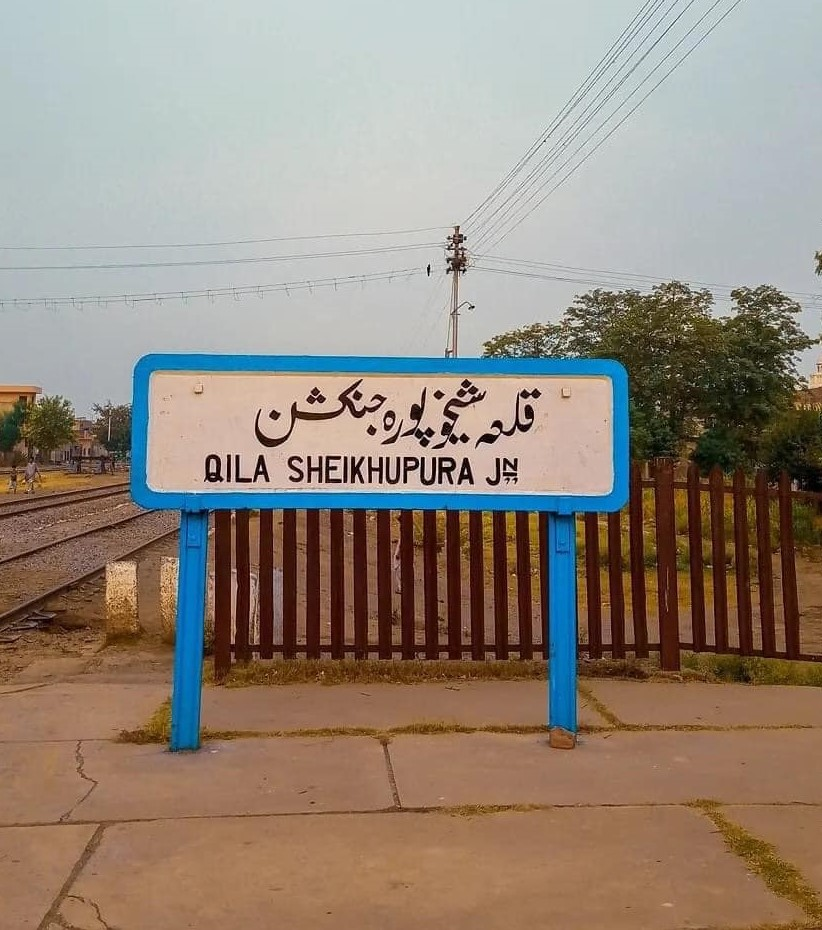

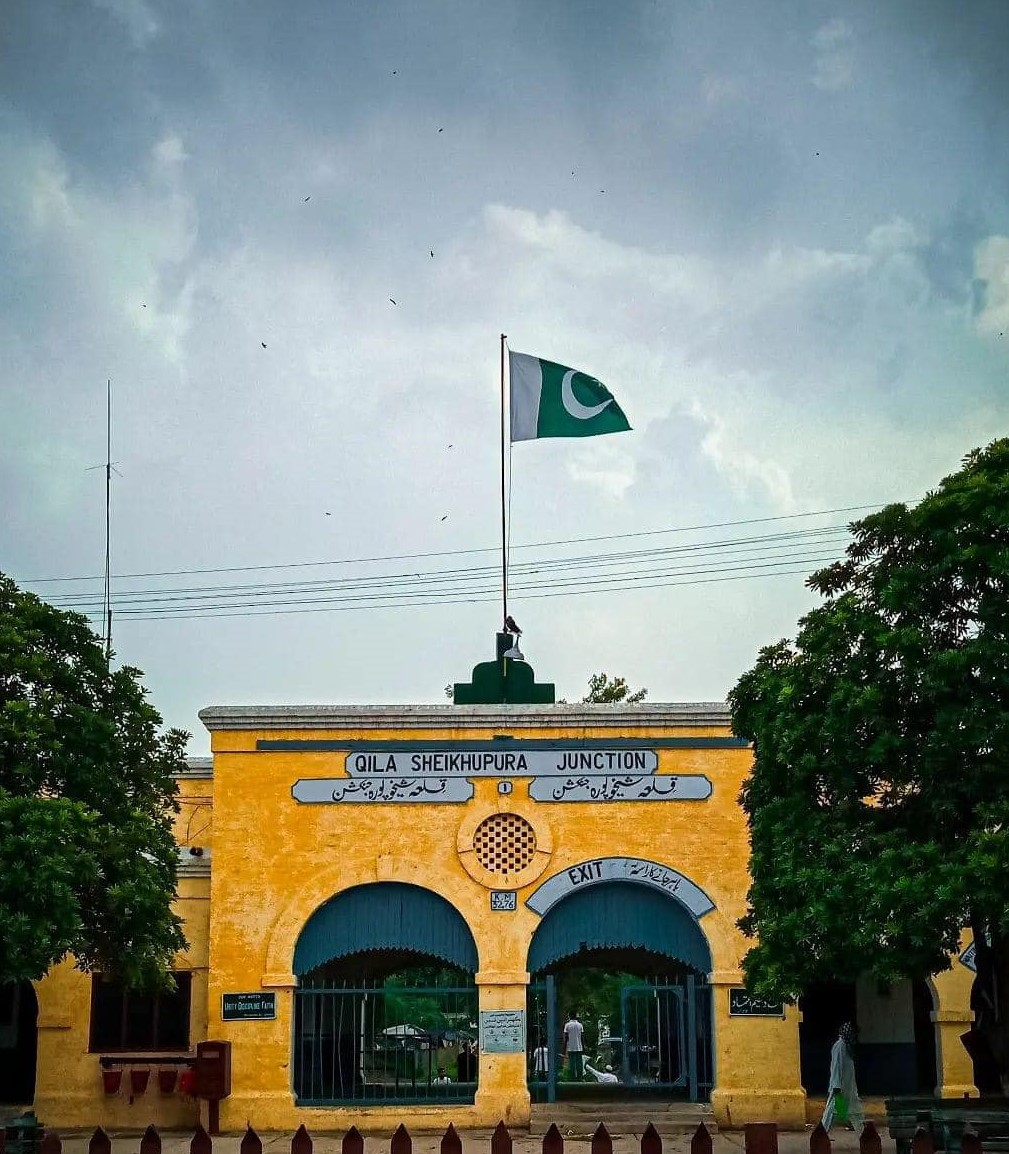

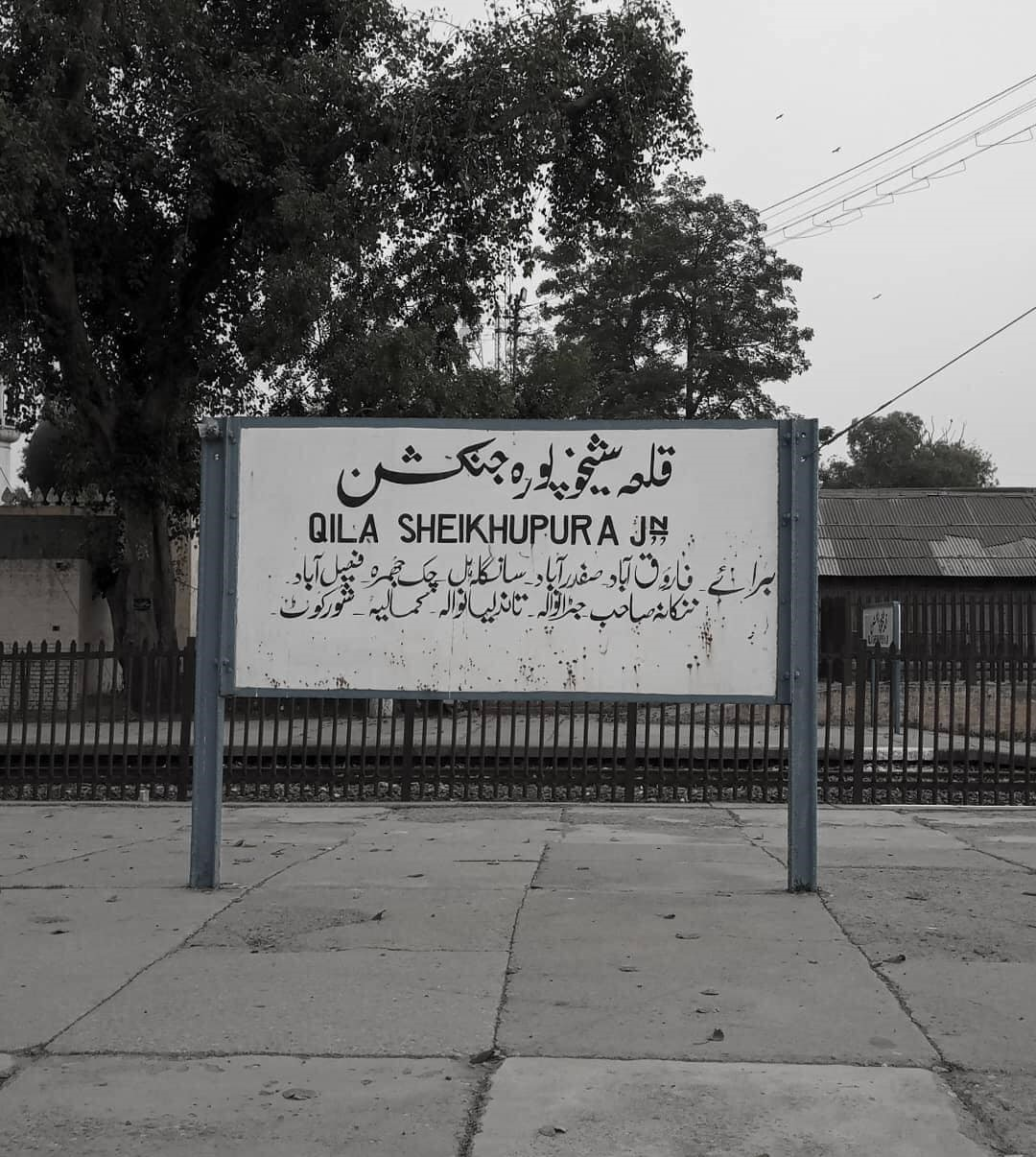

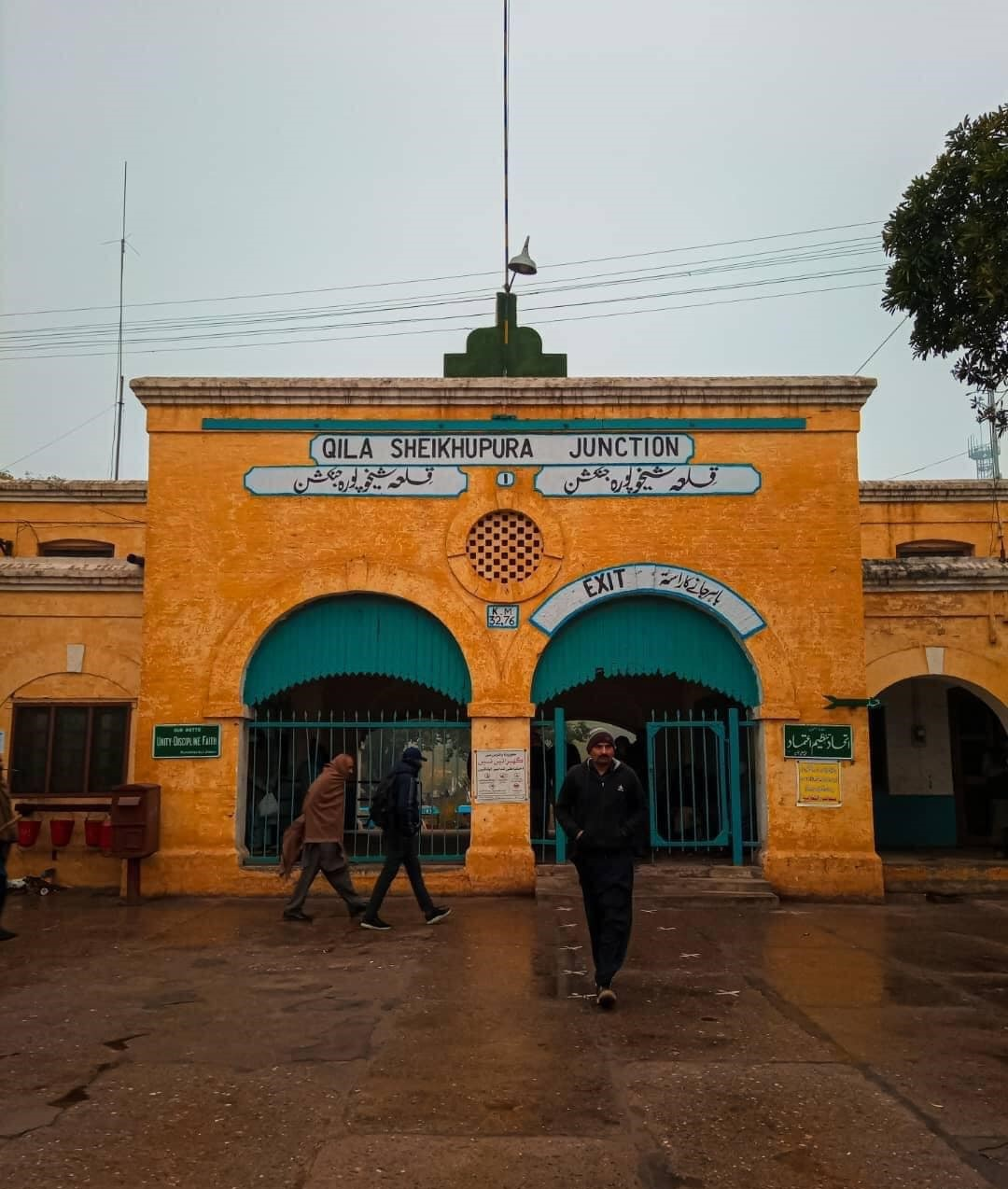

== See also ==
- List of railway stations in Pakistan
- Pakistan Railways
