= Transport in Lahore =

Overview of Transportation in Lahore

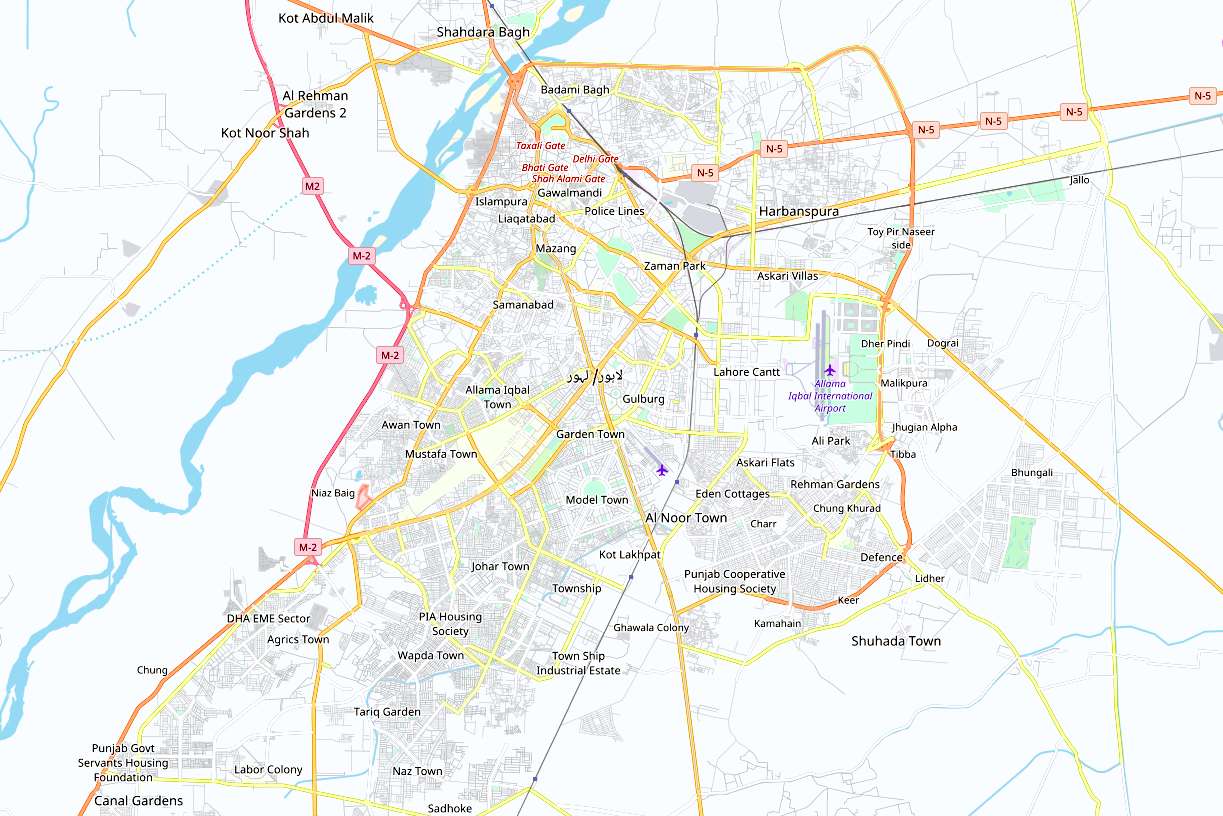
Map of Lahore showing major roads, railways & airports (click to enlarge)

There are several modes of transport available in Lahore.

== Rickshaw and taxi ==
Ride-hailing services Uber and Careem have been introduced by some private companies. However these taxis need to be booked in advance by booking on apps and calling their number.

Auto rickshaws play an important role of public transport in Lahore. There are 246,458 auto rickshaws, often simply called autos, in the city. Since 2002, all auto rickshaws have been required to use CNG as fuel.

== Bus services ==
=== Bus rapid transit ===
==== Lahore Metro Bus System ====
The Lahore Metro Bus System (MBS) is Pakistan's first bus rapid transit system that runs from Gajju Mata to Shahdara down Lahore's main artery, Ferozepur Road. The route has forty-five 18-metre-long articulated buses that run between twenty-seven stations along a 27 km corridor; nine stations are built on top of an overhead bridge.

It was inaugurated by Punjab Chief Minister Shahbaz Sharif on February 11, 2013, in a ceremony attended by Turkish Deputy Prime Minister Bekir Bozdağ, and Prime Minister Nawaz Sharif. The service was free for one month after launch.

The Traffic Engineering and Planning Agency (TEPA), a subsidiary of the Lahore Development Authority (LDA), was entrusted with the task of constructing the MBS, a copy of Istanbul's Metrobus, its own BRT system, in collaboration with Turkish experts. The project ended up costing Rs 29.8 billion. It replaced the shelved the Lahore Rapid Mass Transit system which would have connected Shahdra and Hamza Town but would have cost $2.4 billion.

==== TransLahore ====
TransLahore also known as Lahore Transport Company (LTC) is a public transit bus system established for the carrying of urban passengers in Lahore, Punjab. It also operates a bus rapid transit system in Lahore. However, the BRTs do not have dedicated lanes and right of privilege. It was established under the companies ordinance of 1984. LTC got all the transport responsibilities of traveling in Lahore in December 2009.The fleet of TransLahore has more than 650 buses which run throughout the city as well as sub-urban areas of the city.

It travels under routes issued by the Government of Punjab. It issues students "Green Card", which means that PKR 10 will be charged by the students on LTC's Buses. The buses are air conditioned and have separate sections for men and women.

=== Bus companies ===
Several bus companies also operate in Lahore. Premier Bus Services, owned by the Beaconhouse Group, was started in 2003, and provides transportation services to the general public in Lahore. With over 240 buses running on exclusive routes, it is the largest public transport company in Pakistan. As of 2010, the buses are in the process of being converted to compressed natural gas for environmental and economic reasons.

Sammi Daewoo's City Bus Division operates four routes within the city and two suburban routes for Gujranwala and Sheikhupura.

== Lahore Metro ==
Lahore Metro
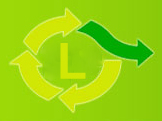

Overview
- Native name: لاہور میٹرو
- Locale: Lahore, Pakistan
- Transit type: Rapid transit
- Number of lines: 3

Operation
- Began operation: 25 October 2020; 6 years ago
- Operator: Lahore Mass Transit Authority

Technical
- System length: 27 km (16.78 mi)
- Track gauge: 1,435 mm (4 ft 8 1/2 in)

The Lahore Metro or Lahore Rapid Mass Transit System is an under construction rapid transit system (metro train system) for Lahore, the second largest city of Pakistan. First proposed in 1991, funding was not secured, and in 2012 it was abandoned by the Punjab government in favour of the more cost–effective Lahore Metro Bus System which opened in February 2013. However, the Punjab Government decided to restart development on the Lahore Metro as a $1.6 billion project with Chinese assistance.

=== Orange Line ===
Orange Line is an automated rapid transit line in Lahore, Punjab, Pakistan and the first driverless metro in Pakistan. It is operated by the Punjab Mass Transit Authority and forms part of the Lahore Metro system. The line is Pakistan's first metro train. The line spans 27.1 km (16.8 mi) with 25.4 km (15.8 mi) elevated and 1.72 km (1.1 mi) underground. The line is served by 26 stations and is expected to handle 250,000 passenger daily. The Orange line is being financed by both the Government of Pakistan, and Government of China.

=== Blue Line ===
The Blue Line is a proposed 24-kilometre (15 mi) line from Chauburji to College Road, Township.

=== Purple Line ===
The Purple Line is a proposed 32-kilometre (20 mi) Airport rail link.

== Railways ==
=== Railways and commuter trains ===
Pakistan Railways is headquartered in Lahore. Pakistan Railways provides an important mode of transportation for commuters and connects distant parts of the country with Lahore for business, sightseeing, pilgrimage, and education. The Lahore railway station, built during the British colonial era, is located in the heart of the city and serves as the major entry and exit point of the city. Other railway stations within Lahore include:

- Badami Bagh railway station
- Harbanspura railway station
- Jallo railway station
- Kot Lakhpat railway station
- Lahore Cantonment railway station
- Moghalpura Junction railway station
- Walton railway station

== Airport ==
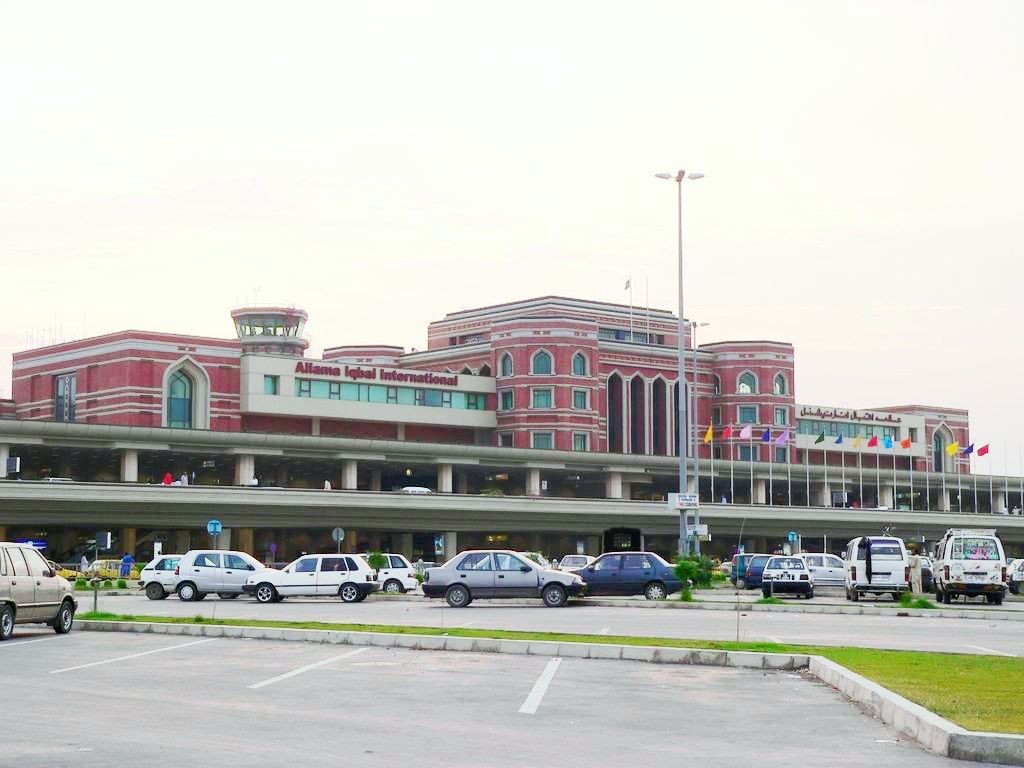
Allama Iqbal International Airport

To accommodate increased air travel, the government built a new city airport in 2003. It was named Allama Iqbal International Airport after the national poet-philosopher of Pakistan, Allama Muhammad Iqbal, and is served by international airlines. as well as the national flag carrier, Pakistan International Airlines. The previous airport now operates as the Hajj terminal to facilitate the great influx of pilgrims travelling to Saudi Arabia to perform the hajj every year. Lahore also has a general aviation airport known as Walton Airport.

Allama Iqbal International Airport connects Lahore with many cities worldwide (including domestic destinations) by both passenger and cargo flight including Ras al Khaimah, Guangzhou (begins 28 August 2018), Ürümqi, Abu Dhabi, Barcelona, Beijing–Capital, Copenhagen, Dammam, Delhi, Dera Ghazi Khan, Doha, Dubai–International, Islamabad, Jeddah, Karachi, Kuala Lumpur–International, London–Heathrow, Manchester, Medina, Milan–Malpensa, Multan, Muscat, Oslo–Gardermoen, Paris–Charles de Gaulle, Peshawar, Quetta, Rahim Yar Khan, Riyadh, Salalah, Tokyo–Narita, Toronto–Pearson, Mashhad, Bangkok–Suvarnabhumi, Tashkent

== See also ==
- Lahore Dry Port
- List of streets in Lahore
- Transport in Pakistan
