= Taqipur railway station =

Railway station in Pakistan

Taqipur Railway Station تقی پور ریلوے اسٹیشن

General information
- Coordinates: 31.5825°N 74.5269°E
- Owner: Ministry of Railways
- Line: Lahore–Wagah Branch Line

Other information
- Station code: TQPR

Services
Preceding station	Pakistan Railways	Following station
Jallo towards Lahore Junction	Lahore–Wagah Branch Line	Wagah Terminus
Location

Taqipur Railway Station (Urdu: تقی پور ریلوے اسٹیشن) is located in Pakistan.

== See also ==
- List of railway stations in Pakistan
- Pakistan Railways
