= Muslimabad (disambiguation) =

Mardan may also refer to:

== Places ==
- Muslim Abad, a village and union council of Haripur District of Khyber Pakhtunkhwa, Pakistan
- Muslimabad, a neighbourhood of Landhi Town in Karachi, Sindh, Pakistan
- Muslimabad Kohat, a village of Kohat District of Khyber Pakhtunkhwa, Pakistan
- Muslimabad (Mardan), a village of Mardan District, Khyber Pakhtunkhwa, Pakistan

== Railway Station ==
- Muslimaabad railway station, is located in Pakistan
