= Terrorist incidents in Pakistan in 1998 =

- 28 February — 8 people were killed on Saturday by two bombs exploding 20 minutes apart in the eastern neighborhood of Karachi. A music store and a hardware shop were targeted in the attack. Earlier on Thursday and Friday, 3 bombs exploded in the Punjab province — killing 3 people on a train, 5 people in a bus and wounding 7 in a crowded market.
- 9 March — 7 people were wounded by a bomb explosion outside a court in Sukkur.
- 9 March — 5 people were killed and 35 wounded by a bomb explosion on Chiltan Express traveling from Lahore to Quetta. The explosion occurred while the train was crossing a bridge over a canal near Pattoki. There were reports that some people had fallen in the canal.
- 10 March — On the Tuesday morning, a bomb blast occurred on Walton railway station, in a Lahore-bound train killing at least 10 and wounding more than 80 people. State authorities described the bomb as a timing device that was planted at an earlier stop. Although, no one claimed responsibility but Pakistan's government blamed the attack on its neighbor India. Information Minister Mushahid Hussain told reporter that Pakistan had irrefutable evidence against R&AW's involvement. However, Indian Foreign Ministry spokesperson Pavan Varma called the claims as baseless.
- June 6 — 3 people were killed and 10 injured in bomb explosion in a movie theater in Lahore.
- June 8 — 23 people were killed as a bomb exploded on moving Khyber Mail (Train) heading towards Peshawar, on Tando Masti Khan railway station.
