= Lahore Junction railway station =

Railway station in Pakistan

Lahore Junction Railway Station لاہور جنکشن ریلوے اسٹیشن
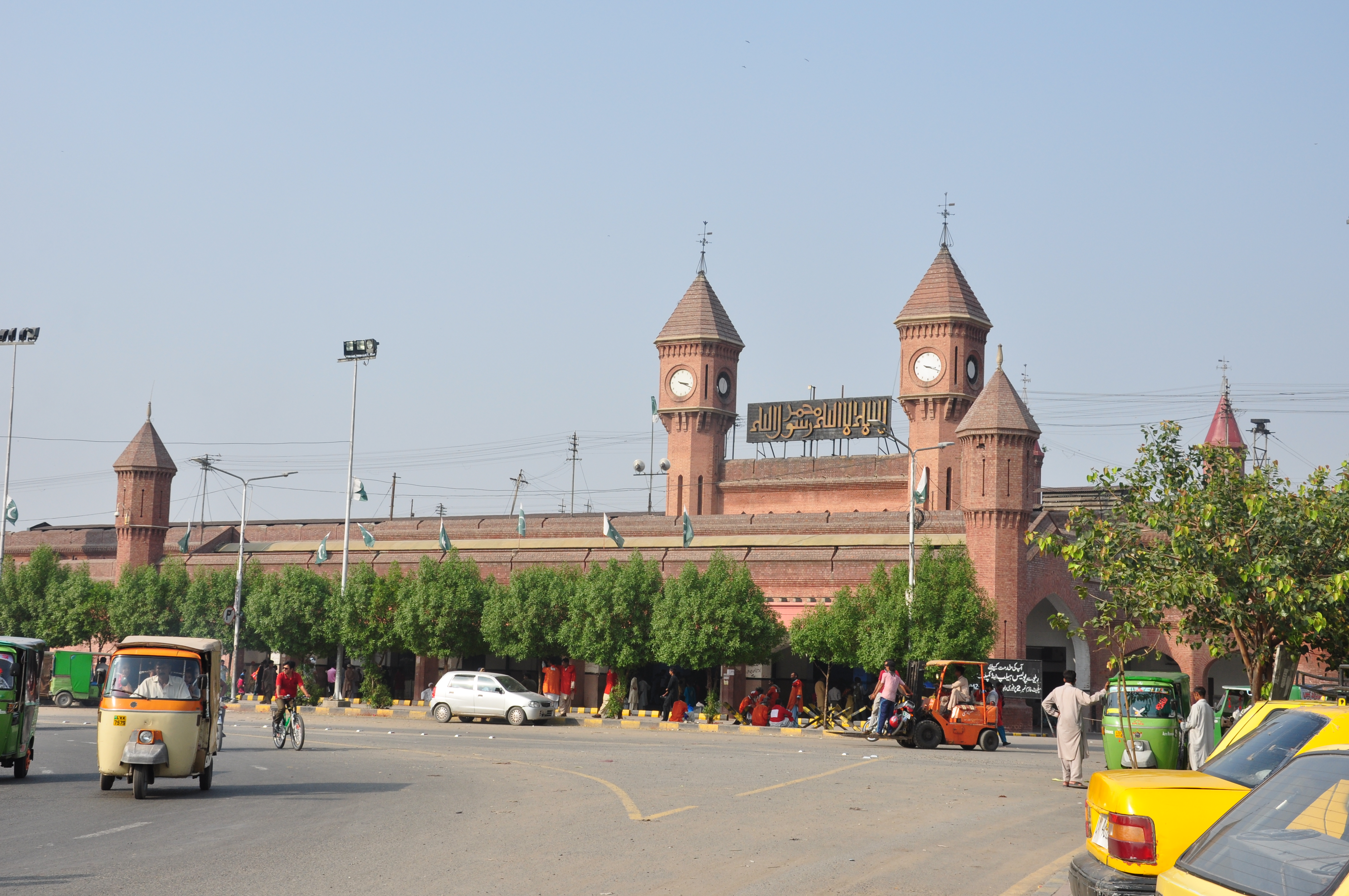
- Lahore Junction Station Entrance

General information
- Location: Empress Road; Lahore-54000; Pakistan
- Coordinates: 31.5772°N 74.3363°E
- Owner: Ministry of Railways
- Lines: Karachi–Peshawar Railway Line; Lahore–Wagah Branch Line
- Platforms: 11
- Connections: LTC (B-5); PMTA (FR-1, FR-3, FR-9); Lahore Metro (Lahore Station)

Construction
- Structure type: Standard (on ground station)
- Platform levels: 2
- Parking: Available
- Cycle facilities: Available
- Accessible: Available

Other information
- Status: Functional
- Station code: LHR
- Fare zone: Pakistan Railways Lahore Zone

History
- Opened: 1860; 166 years ago
- Former names: Guru Amar Das Railway Station

Services
| Preceding station | Pakistan Railways | Following station |
|---|---|---|
| Lahore Cantonment towards Kiamari | Karachi–Peshawar Line | Badami Bagh towards Peshawar Cantonment |
| Terminus | Lahore–Wagah Branch Line | Moghalpura Junction towards Wagah |
Location
- Location within Lahore Location within Pakistan

Lahore Junction Railway Station (Urdu, Punjabi: لاہور جنکشن ریلوے اسٹیشن), is the main railway station in Lahore, Pakistan. It is among the oldest railway stations of the Indian subcontinent. Construction commenced shortly after the 1857 War of Independence. It was built in the style of a medieval fort with thick walls, turrets, and holes to direct gun and cannon fire for the defence of the structure.

It is located at the junction between Circular Road and Allama Iqbal Road and bounded on the north side by the old Grand Trunk Road. The station is now owned by Pakistan Railways, and also serves as its headquarters.

== History ==
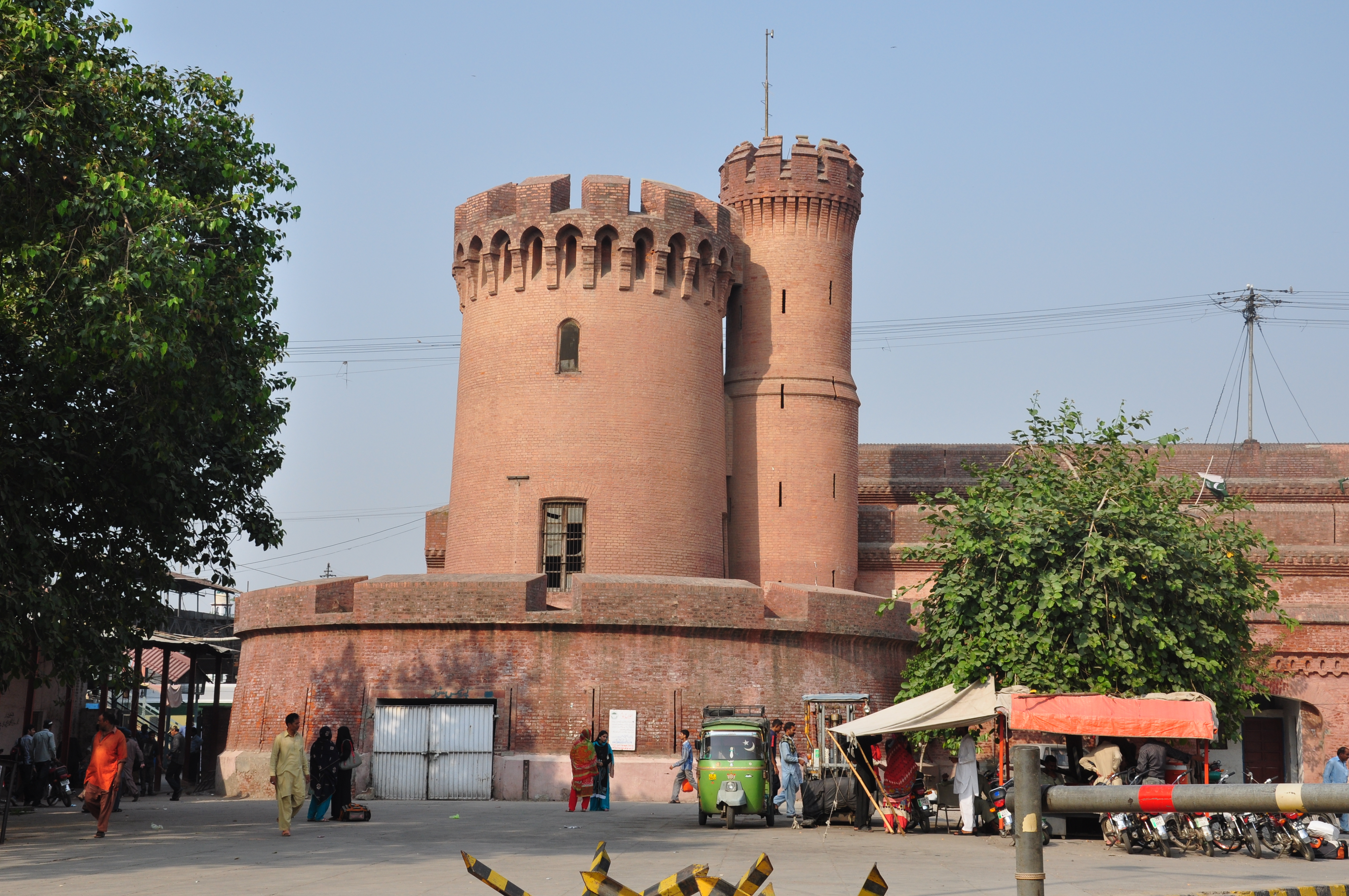
The station's design is highly militarised, having been constructed in the immediate aftermath of the 1857 Sepoy Mutiny.

The station was built during the colonial era, and was built just outside the Walled City at the intersection of Empress Road, Allama Iqbal Road and Circular Road. Lahore Junction station was constructed by Mian Mohammad Sultan Chughtai, a former official of the Mughal Empire, between 1859 and 1860.

The station was also a witness to a brutal lathi charge in British era that took place on 30 October 1928 near the premises of the junction when Indian leader Lala Lajpat Rai had led a protest march against the Simon Commission that had come to Lahore to discuss political reforms in the town. Rai was beaten by a wooden baton by the then Police Superintendent of Lahore and was badly wounded. Rai later died of his injuries on 17 November.

The station served as the headquarters for the Punjab Railway and later would serve as the northern terminus of the Scinde, Punjab & Delhi Railway, which connected the port city of Karachi to Lahore. The nearby Dai Anga Mosque was also converted into offices for the railways at this time. The station was built in the style of a medieval castle to ward off any potential future uprisings, as seen in the Sepoy Mutiny of 1857, with thick walls, turrets, and holes to direct gun and cannon fire for the defence of the structure.

The station is a legacy of the extensive railway network established during the British Raj, and reflects the British contribution to the region's infrastructure. The station was severely affected during the riots which followed the Partition of the British Indian Empire and the independence of Pakistan in 1947. Similar to the contemporaneous situation of Muslims fleeing Delhi and Amritsar, Lahore's Hindus and Sikhs were sometimes attacked at Lahore's train station.

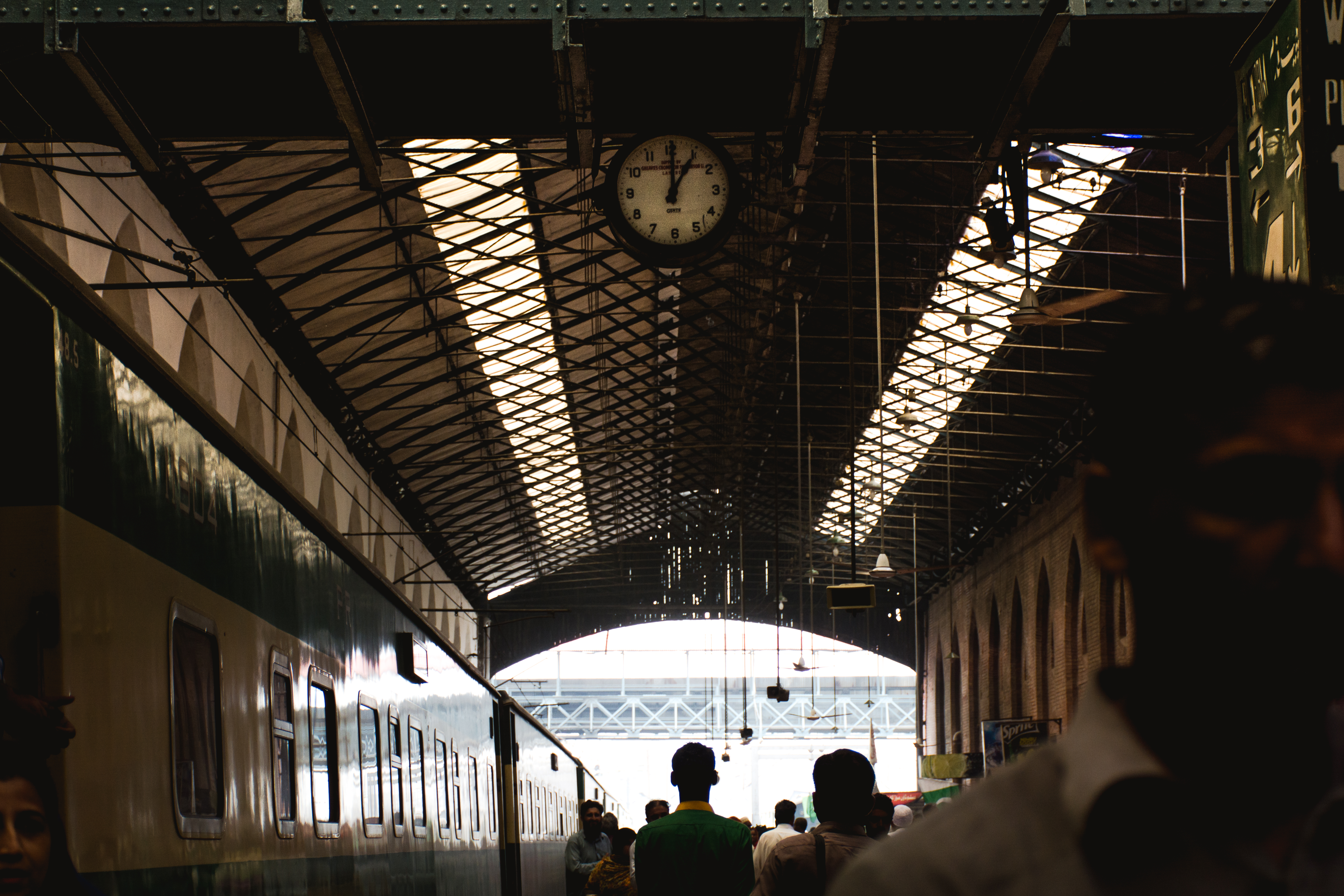
Inside the Station

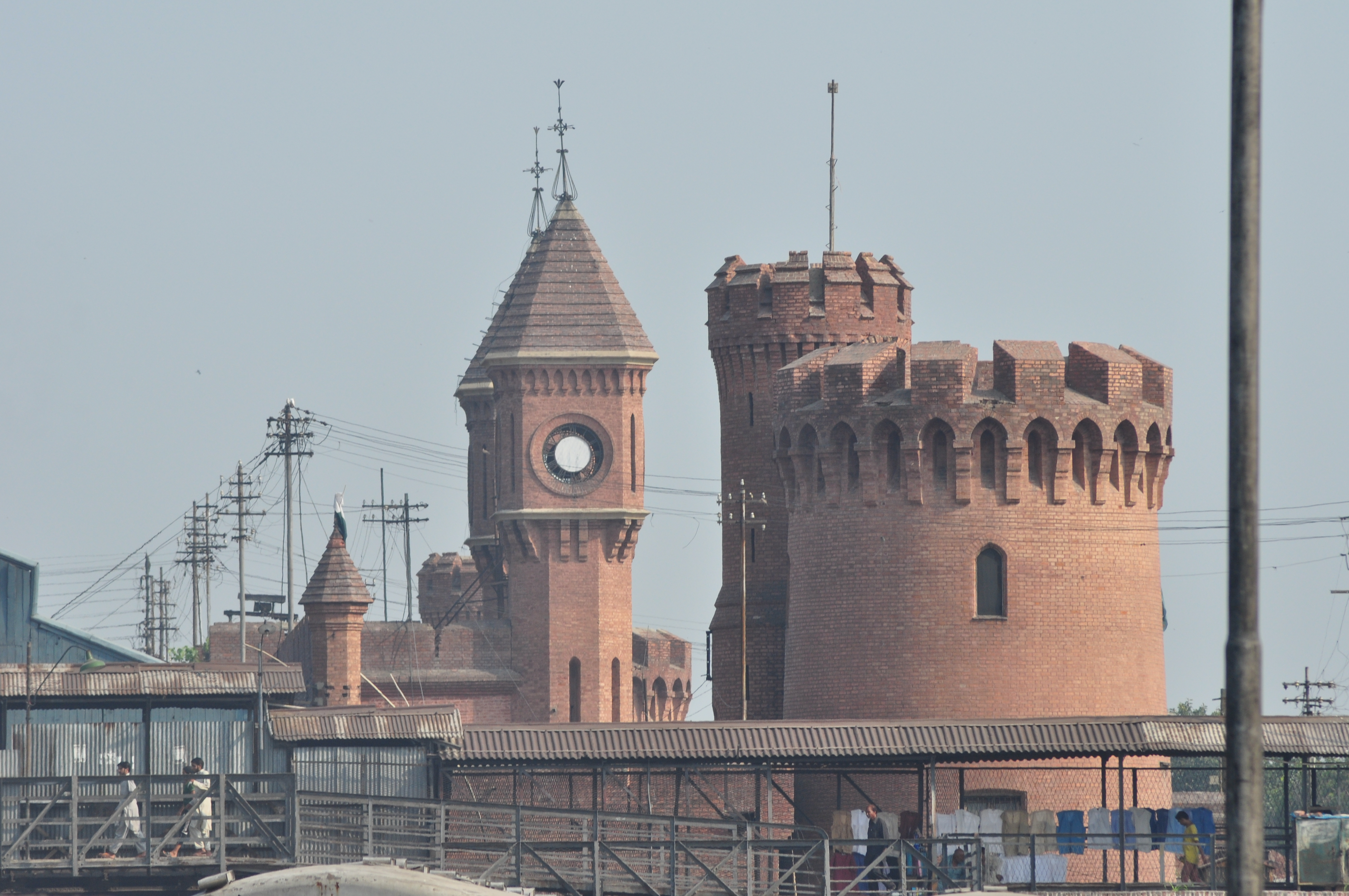
Lahore Junction Station view from top

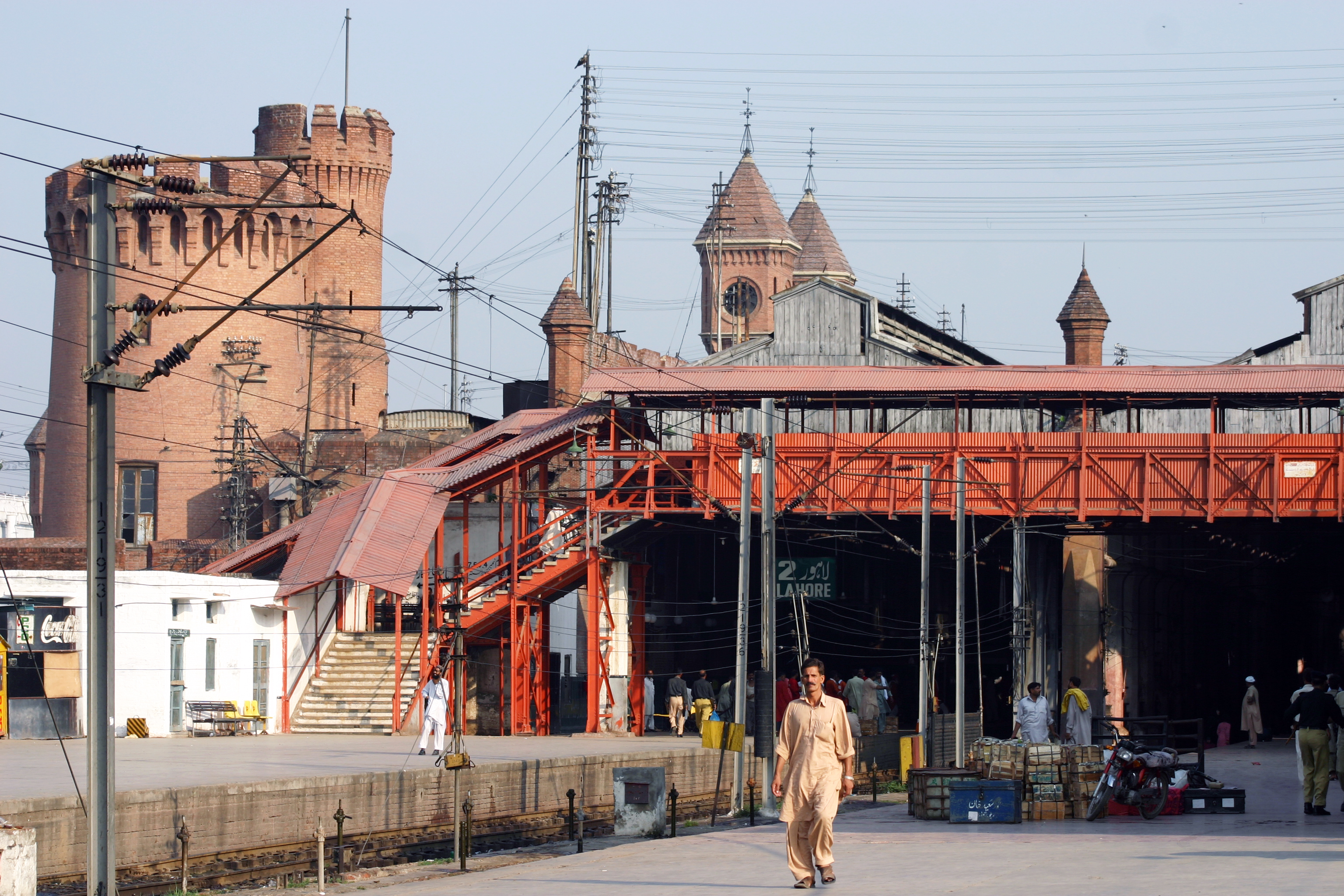
Lahore Junction Station inner view

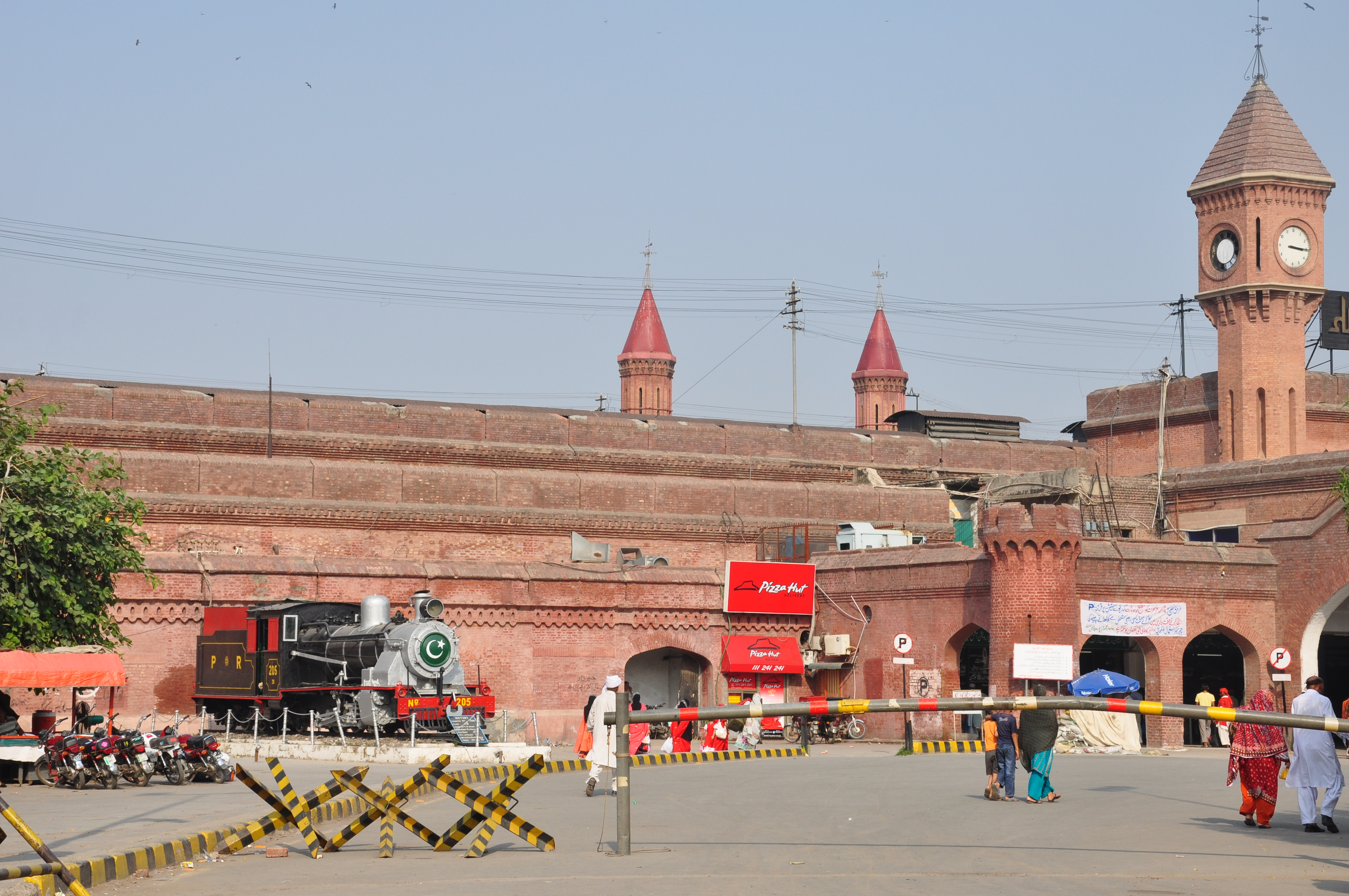
Lahore Junction Station outer wall

== Facilities ==
Lahore Junction Station is equipped with all basic facilities such as ticketing services, washrooms and waiting areas. The station has current and advance reservation offices for Pakistan Railways, as well as freight and parcel facilities. Retail shops are found mainly on platforms 2, 4 and 5.

== Overview ==
The Lahore railway station is located at an elevation of 213 metres (764 ft) and was assigned the code "LHR". With this, it has become the busiest railway station of Pakistan in terms of passenger movement and train traffic. Lahore railway station has free WiFi and CCTV cameras.

== Services ==
These trains serve Lahore Junction station:

| Up Destination | Train | Train Name | Train | Down Destination |
|---|---|---|---|---|
| Karachi Cantt | 1 Up | Khyber Mail Express | 2 Dn | Peshawar Cantt |
| Karachi Cantt | 5 Up | Green Line Express | 6 Dn | Islamabad |
| Karachi Cantt | 7 Up | Tezgam Express | 8 Dn | Rawalpindi |
| Karachi Cantt | 9 Up | Allama Iqbal Express | 10 Dn | Sialkot |
| Karachi Cantt | 13 Up | Awam Express | 14 Dn | Peshawar Cantt |
| Karachi Cantt | 15 Up | Karachi Express | 16 Dn | (Lahore Junction) |
| Quetta | 23 Up | Akbar Express | 24 Dn | (Lahore Junction) |
| Karachi Cantt | 27 Up | Shalimar Express | 28 Dn | (Lahore Junction) |
| Karachi Cantt | 31 Up | Jinnah Express | 32 Dn | (Lahore Junction) |
| Karachi Cantt | 33 Up | Pak Business Express | 34 Dn | (Lahore Junction) |
| Karachi City | 37 Up | Fareed Express | 38 Dn | (Lahore Junction) |
| Quetta | 39 Up | Jaffer Express | 40 Dn | Peshawar Cantt |
| Karachi Cantt | 41 Up | Karakorum Express | 42 Dn | (Lahore Junction) |
| Karachi Cantt | 43 Up | Shah Hussain Express | 44 Dn | (Lahore Junction) |
| (Lahore Junction) | 101 Up | Subak Raftar Express | 102 Dn | Rawalpindi |
| (Lahore Junction) | 103 Up | Subak Kharam Express | 104 Dn | Rawalpindi |
| (Lahore Junction) | 105 Up | Rawal Express | 106 Dn | Rawalpindi |
| (Lahore Junction) | 107 Up | Islamabad Express | 108 Dn | Rawalpindi |
| Faisalabad | 111 Up | Badar Express | 112 Dn | (Lahore Junction) |
| Faisalabad | 113 Up | Ghouri Express | 114 Dn | (Lahore Junction) |
| Multan | 115 Up | Musa Pak Express | 116 Dn | (Lahore Junction) |
| Multan | 117 Up | Multan Express | 118 Dn | (Lahore Junction) |
| Faisalabad | 119 Up | Faisal Express | 120 Dn | (Lahore Junction) |
| Shorkot Cantt | 121 Up | Ravi Express | 122 Dn | (Lahore Junction) |
| Sargodha | 123 Up | Sargodha Express | 124 Dn | (Lahore Junction) |
| (Lahore Junction) | 125 Up | Lasani Express | 126 Dn | Sialkot |
| Mari Indus | 147 Up | Mianwali Express | 148 Dn | (Lahore Junction) |
| (Lahore Junction) | 205 Up | Babu Passenger | 206 Dn | Wazirabad |
| Shorkot Cantt | 207 Up | Waris Shah Passenger | 208 Dn | (Lahore Junction) |
| (Lahore Junction) | 209 Up | Faiz Ahmed Faiz Passenger | 210 Dn | Narowal |
| (Lahore Junction) | 211 Up | Narowal Passenger | 212 Dn | Narowal |
| Attari | 401 Up | Samjhota Express | 402 Dn | (Lahore Junction) |

== Other Services ==
Pakistan Railways is headquartered in Lahore. Pakistan Railways provides an important mode of transportation for commuters and connects distant parts of the country with Lahore for business, sightseeing, pilgrimage, and education. The Lahore railway station, built during the British colonial era, is located in the heart of the city and serves as the major entry and exit point of the city. Other railway stations within Lahore include:

- Badami Bagh railway station
- Harbanspura railway station
- Jallo railway station
- Kot Lakhpat railway station
- Lahore Cantonment railway station
- Moghalpura Junction railway station
- Walton railway station

== Gallery ==
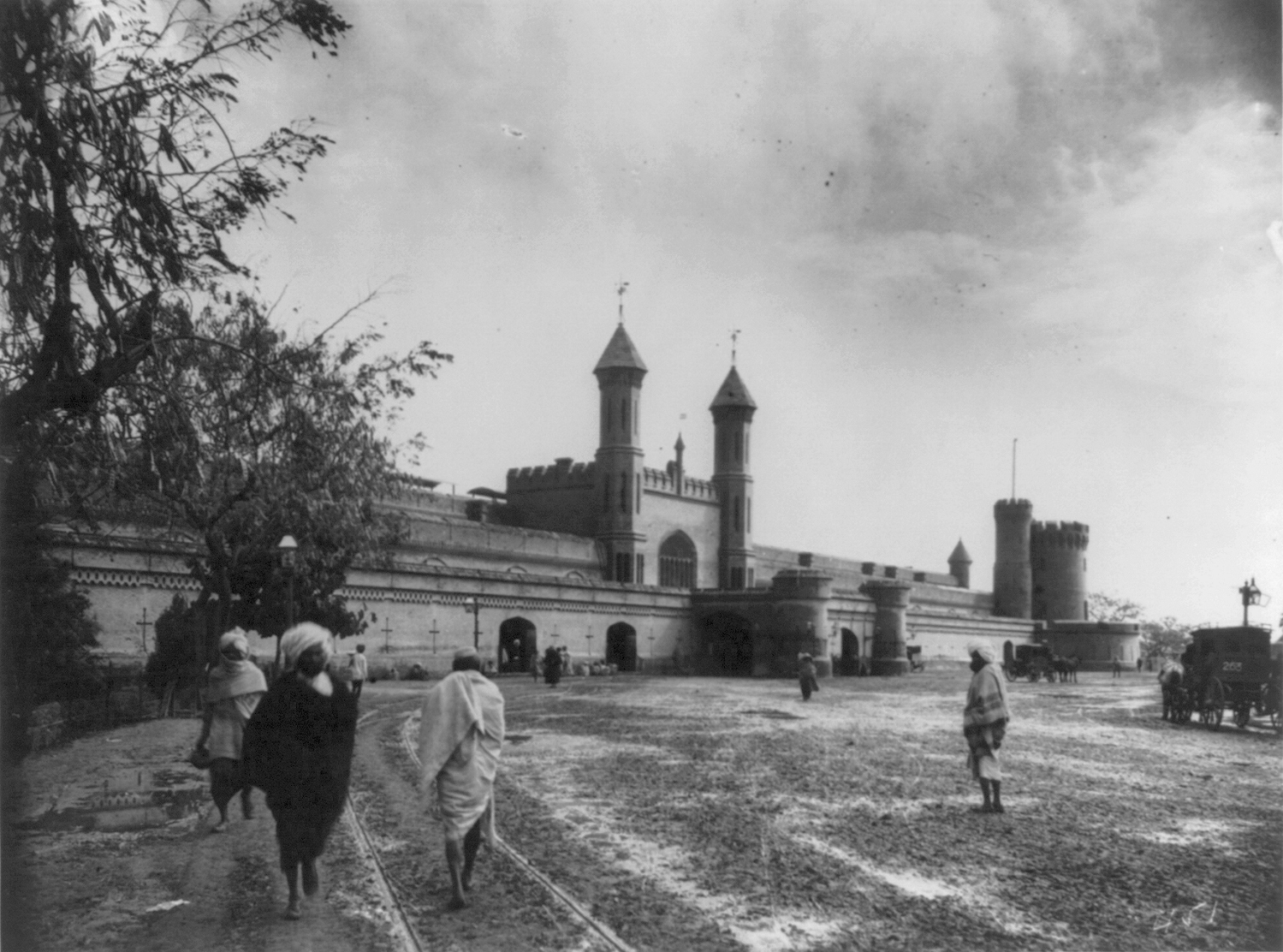

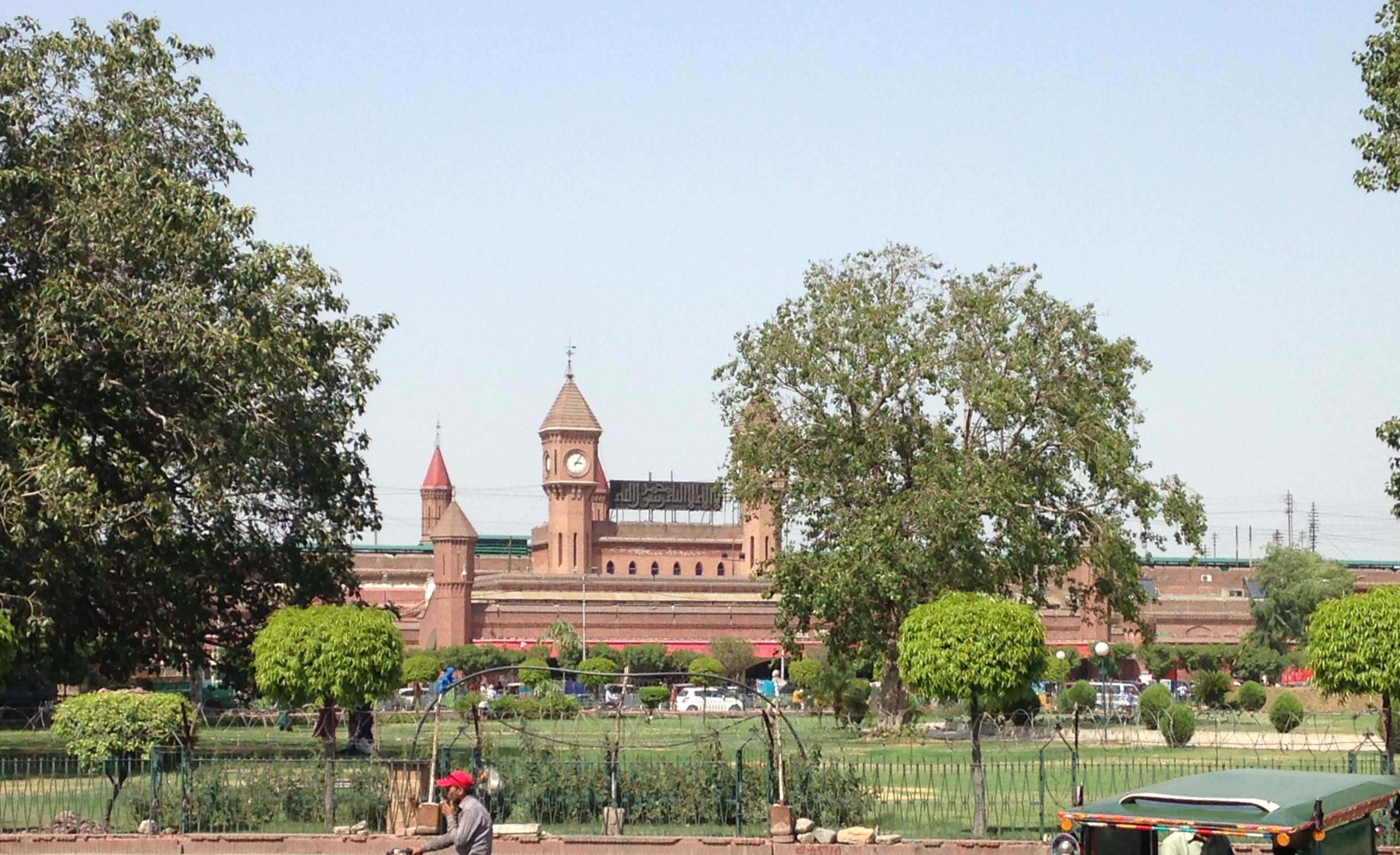
General View of Railway Station in June 2019

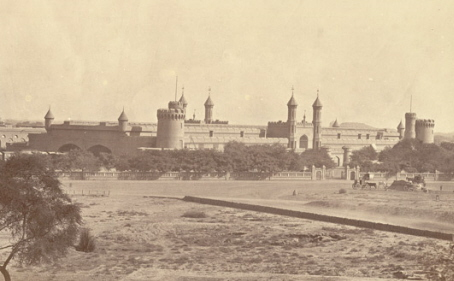
Far view of Railway Station in 1880s

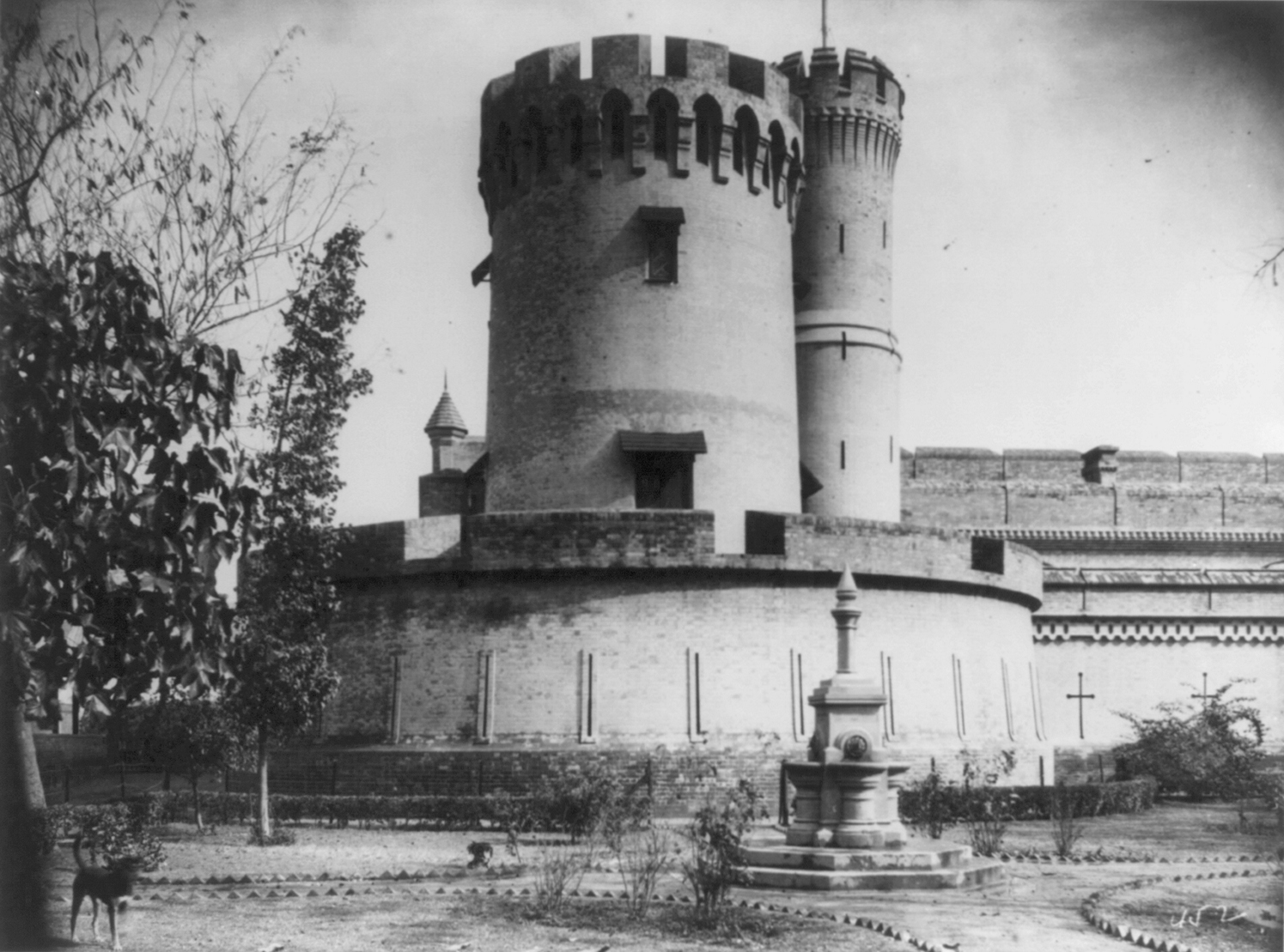
Fortifications of Railway Station 1895 by William Henry Jackson

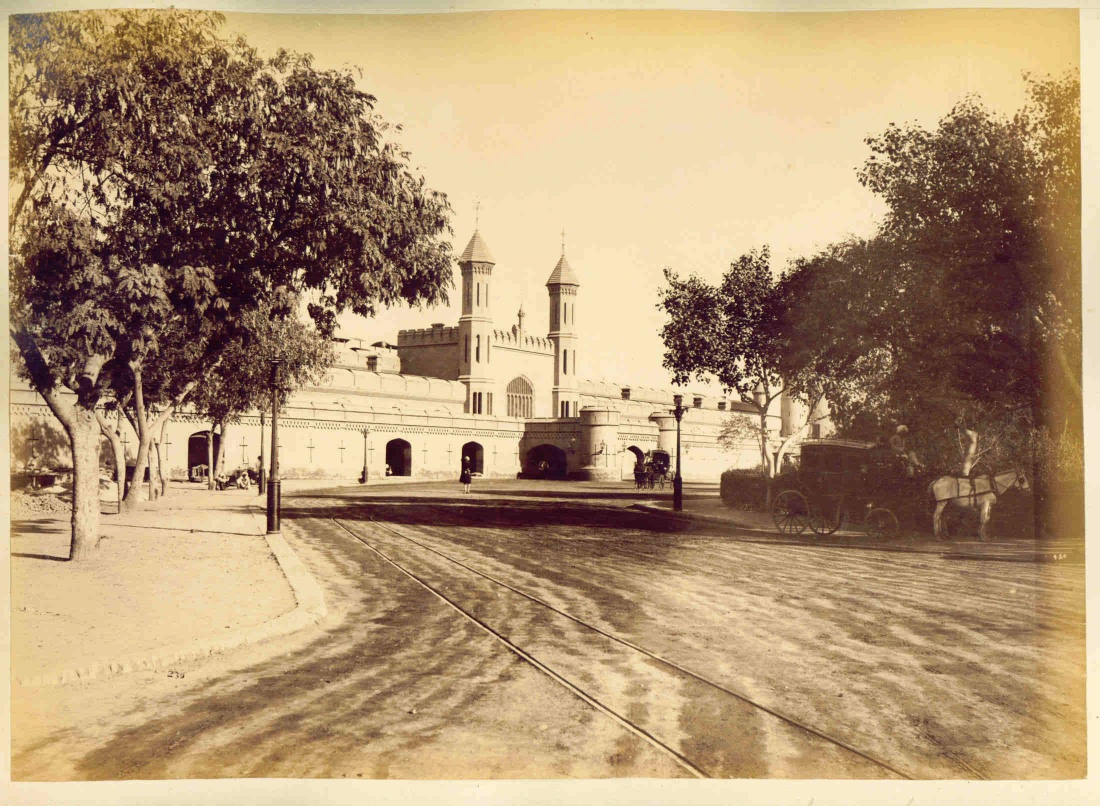
Railway Station in 1880s

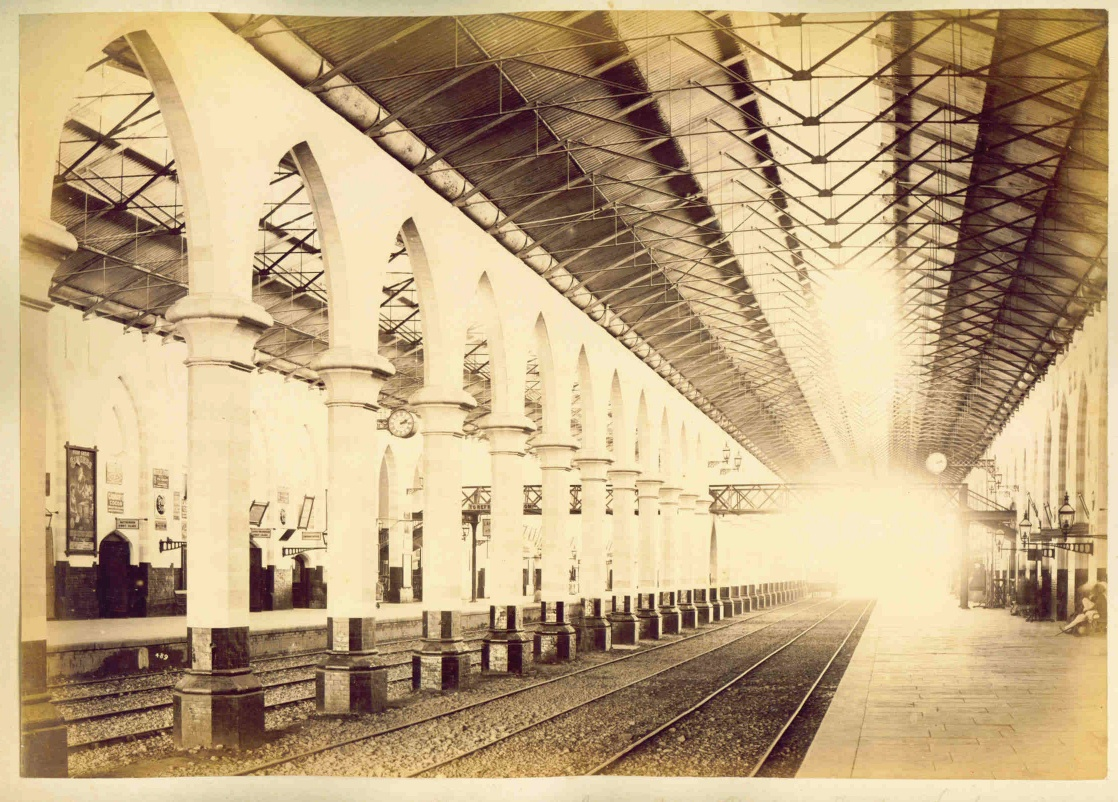
Railway Station Interior View 1880s

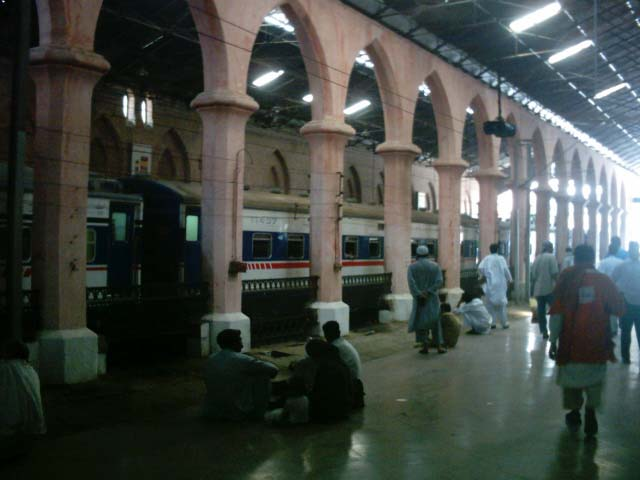
Train platform at Lahore Railway Station

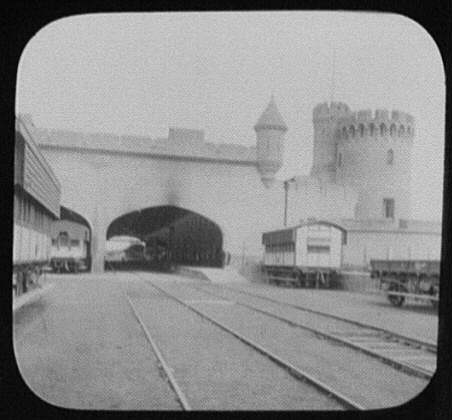
Lahore - entrance to railway station 1895

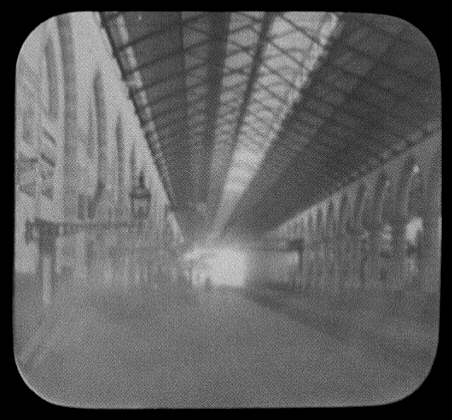
Lahore - interior of railway station 1895

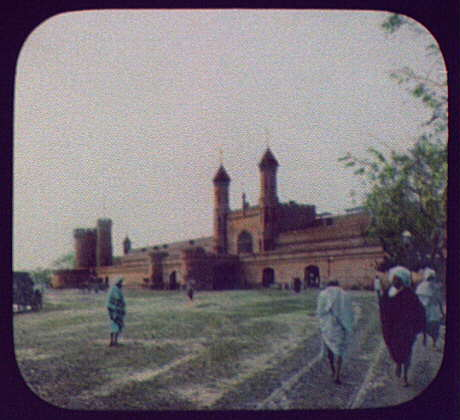
Lahore - general view of railway station 1895

== See also ==
- Pakistan Railways
- List of railway stations in Pakistan
