= Lahore–Wagah Branch Line =

Branch railway line in Pakistan

Lahore–Wagah Branch Line لاہور-واہگہ برانچ لائن

Overview
- Owner: Pakistan Railways
- Termini: Lahore Junction; Wagah
- Stations: 7

Service
- Operator: Pakistan Railways

Technical
- Line length: 23 km (14 mi)
- Track gauge: 1,676 mm (5 ft 6 in)

Lahore–Wagah Branch Line (Urdu: لاہور-واہگہ برانچ لائن) is one of several branch lines in Pakistan, operated and maintained by Pakistan Railways. The line starts at Lahore Junction station and ends at Wagah station, at the border with India. The line’s total length is 23 kilometers (14 mi), serving 7 stations. The original line continued on to Amritsar. The line was used by Samjhauta Express train. Nowadays no train is working on this line. The line is only used for Moghalpura workshop and sometimes for special trains.

== Stations ==
- Lahore Junction
- Moghalpura
- Muslimaabad
- Harbanspura
- Gullar Pir Halt
- Jallo
- Wagah

== See also ==
- Karachi–Peshawar Railway Line
- Railway Lines in Pakistan
