= Pakistan Technical Assistance Programme =

Pakistan's foreign aid assistance programme

The Pakistan Technical Assistance Programme (PTAP) is a bilateral and multilateral initiative primarily responsible for managing civilian foreign aid to other countries. Established in the 1950s, PTAP administers financial assistance, industrial training, and technical expertise to developing countries that maintain diplomatic relations with Pakistan. The programme benefits 65 countries across the Middle East, East Asia, Africa, and Latin America.

To enhance Pakistan's standing in the developing world, PTAP regularly offers educational training and expertise in areas such as commercial banking, railways, steel mills, postal services, and information technology, both domestically and internationally. Its military advisory counterpart, focused on defense cooperation, is limited to nations with historically strong ties to Pakistan.

== Courses ==
- International Commercial Banking Course at National Institute of Banking and Finance, State Bank of Pakistan, Islamabad.
- International Central Banking Course at National Institute of Banking and Finance, State Bank of Pakistan, Islamabad.
- Advanced Railway Course Pakistan Railways Academy, Walton, Lahore.
- Postal Services/Information Technology Course.

== International Training ==
International training is jointly sponsored by the government of Pakistan and the State Bank of Pakistan under the Pakistan Technical Assistance Program (PTAP). The training programs are fully funded and are available to nominees of friendly developing countries. The objectives of the training program are to create and foster goodwill, strengthen bilateral relations, and share expertise and knowledge in the field of banking and finance. For the last three decades, the programs have been in high demand, and a large number of bankers, government functionaries, and officials from almost 105 developing countries have benefited from the program. NIBAF organized and hosted international training in both central and commercial banking, each of four weeks' duration, attended by 38 participants from about 19 developing countries. These countries included Bangladesh, Sri Lanka, Cambodia, Jordan, Nepal, Senegal, Thailand, Uzbekistan, Maldives, Sudan, Iran, Malawi, Myanmar, Senegal, Vietnam, Fiji, Afghanistan, and Indonesia.

== International Training program for Securities Market Managers ==
The International Training program for securities market managers and compliance officers was launched in collaboration with the South Asian Federation of Exchanges (SAFE) and the Futures and Options Association (FOA) of the UK at NIBAF Islamabad. This international training mainly focuses on international standards for the operation and management of securities and derivatives exchanges by covering, in particular, high-level exchange management issues like conflict of interest management, trading practices and procedures, identification and prevention of market manipulation, market supervision and enforcement, and clearing and settlement procedures.
