= Begmanji railway station =

Railway station in Pakistan

Begmanji Railway Station بیگ مانجی ریلوے اسٹیشن بيگمان جي ريلوي اسٽيشن

General information
- Coordinates: 27.5909°N 68.8280°E
- Owner: Ministry of Railways
- Line: Karachi–Peshawar Railway Line

Other information
- Station code: BGE

Services
Preceding station	Pakistan Railways	Following station
Khairpur towards Kiamari	Karachi–Peshawar Line	Rohri Junction towards Peshawar Cantonment
Location

Begmanji Railway Station (Urdu: بیگ مانجی ریلوے اسٹیشن, Sindhi: بیگ مانجي ریلوي اسٽیشن) is located in Begmanji village, Sukkur district of Sindh province of the Pakistan.

== See also ==
- List of railway stations in Pakistan
- Pakistan Railways
