= Jallo Manhala Railway Station =

Railway station in Pakistan

Jallo Manhala Station جلو منہالہ ریلوے اسٹیشن

General information
- Coordinates: 31.5782°N 74.4968°E
- Owner: Ministry of Railways
- Line: Lahore–Wagah Branch Line
- Platforms: 02
- Tracks: Single

Construction
- Parking: Yes

Other information
- Station code: JLO

History
- Opened: 1861

Services
Preceding station	Pakistan Railways	Following station
Harbanspura towards Lahore Junction	Lahore–Wagah Branch Line	Taqipur towards Wagah
Location

Jallo Manhala railway station (Urdu and Punjabi: جلو منہالہ ریلوے اسٹیشن) is located in Lahore District, Pakistan.

== See also ==
- List of railway stations in Pakistan
- Pakistan Railways
