= Harbanspura railway station =

Railway station in Pakistan

Coordinates: 31.5699°N 74.4381°E

Harbanspura Railway Station ہربنس پورہ ریلوے اسٹیشن

General information
- Owner: Ministry of Railways
- Line: Lahore–Wagah Branch Line

Other information
- Station code: HBR

Services
Preceding station	Pakistan Railways	Following station
Moghalpura Junction towards Lahore Junction	Lahore–Wagah Branch Line	Jallo towards Wagah
Location

Harbanspura Railway Station (Urdu: ہربنس پورہ ریلوے اسٹیشن) is located in Pakistan.

== See also ==
- List of railway stations in Pakistan
- Pakistan Railways

Harbanspura Railways station is located in the Eastern Part of Lahore on the Lahore Wagah Border ( Attari ) track. It was established in 1892. The area is known after Raja Harbans Singh, a land lord during the colonial period. It gained more importance due hydrant units for cooling the steam engines. At the time of partition migrants from Pakistan and to Pakistan stayed there temporarily. The station remained functional till late seventies. Now it has been occupied by encroachers.
