= Moghalpura railway station =

Railway station in Pakistan

Mughalpura مغل پورہ ریلوے اسٹیشن

General information
- Coordinates: 31.5602°N 74.3786°E
- Owner: Ministry of Railways
- Line: Lahore–Wagah Branch Line

Other information
- Station code: MGPR

History
- Opened: 1912

Services
Preceding station	Pakistan Railways	Following station
Lahore Junction Terminus	Lahore–Wagah Branch Line	Harbanspura towards Wagah
Location

Mughalpura Railway Station (Urdu and Punjabi: مغل پورہ چوراہا ریلوے اسٹیشن) is located in Lahore, Pakistan. The Moghalpura Railway Workshops are situated here. The workshop complex was established in 1904 under the North Western State Railway to manufacture, repair, and overhaul passenger coaches and freight wagons. Spanning over 190 acres, the facility is the largest rolling-stock maintenance and manufacturing center of Pakistan Railways, encompassing locomotive shops, carriage and wagon shops, electrical workshops, and an apprentice training center.

== See also ==
- List of railway stations in Pakistan
- Pakistan Railways
