= Jia Bagga railway station =

Railway station in Punjab, Pakistan

Jia Bagga Railway Station جیا بگا ریلوے اسٹیشن

General information
- Location: Lahore District, Punjab; Pakistan
- Coordinates: 31.3304°N 74.2668°E
- Owner: Ministry of Railways
- Operator: Pakistan Railways
- Line: Karachi–Peshawar Railway Line
- Distance: 1,192 km (741 mi) from Kiamari

Other information
- Station code: JBA

Services
Preceding station	Pakistan Railways	Following station
Raiwind Junction towards Kiamari	Karachi–Peshawar Line	Kana Kacha towards Peshawar Cantonment
Location

Jia Bagga Railway Station (Urdu and Punjabi: جیا بگا ریلوے اسٹیشن) is located in Jia Bagga village, Lahore district of Punjab province in Pakistan.

Owned by the Ministry of Railways, the station is operated by Pakistan Railways.

== See also ==
- List of railway stations in Pakistan
- Pakistan Railways
