= Kana Kacha railway station =

Railway station in Punjab, Pakistan

Kahna Kacha Railway Station کاہنہ کاچھا ریلوے اسٹیشن

General information
- Coordinates: 31.4001°N 74.3051°E
- Owner: Ministry of Railways
- Line: Karachi–Peshawar Railway Line

Other information
- Status: Closed
- Station code: KKH

History
- Closed: 2016

Services
Preceding station	Pakistan Railways	Following station
Jia Bagga towards Kiamari	Karachi–Peshawar Line	Kot Lakhpat towards Peshawar Cantonment
Location

Kana Kacha Railway Station (Urdu: کاہنہ کاچھا ریلوے اسٹیشن) is an abandoned railway station located in Kana Kacha village, in the Lahore district of Punjab province of the Pakistan. The station was closed in 2016.

== See also ==
- List of railway stations in Pakistan
- Pakistan Railways
