= Khairpur railway station =

Railway station in Pakistan

Khairpur Railway Station خیرپور ریلوے اسٹیشن خيرپور ريلوي اسٽيشن
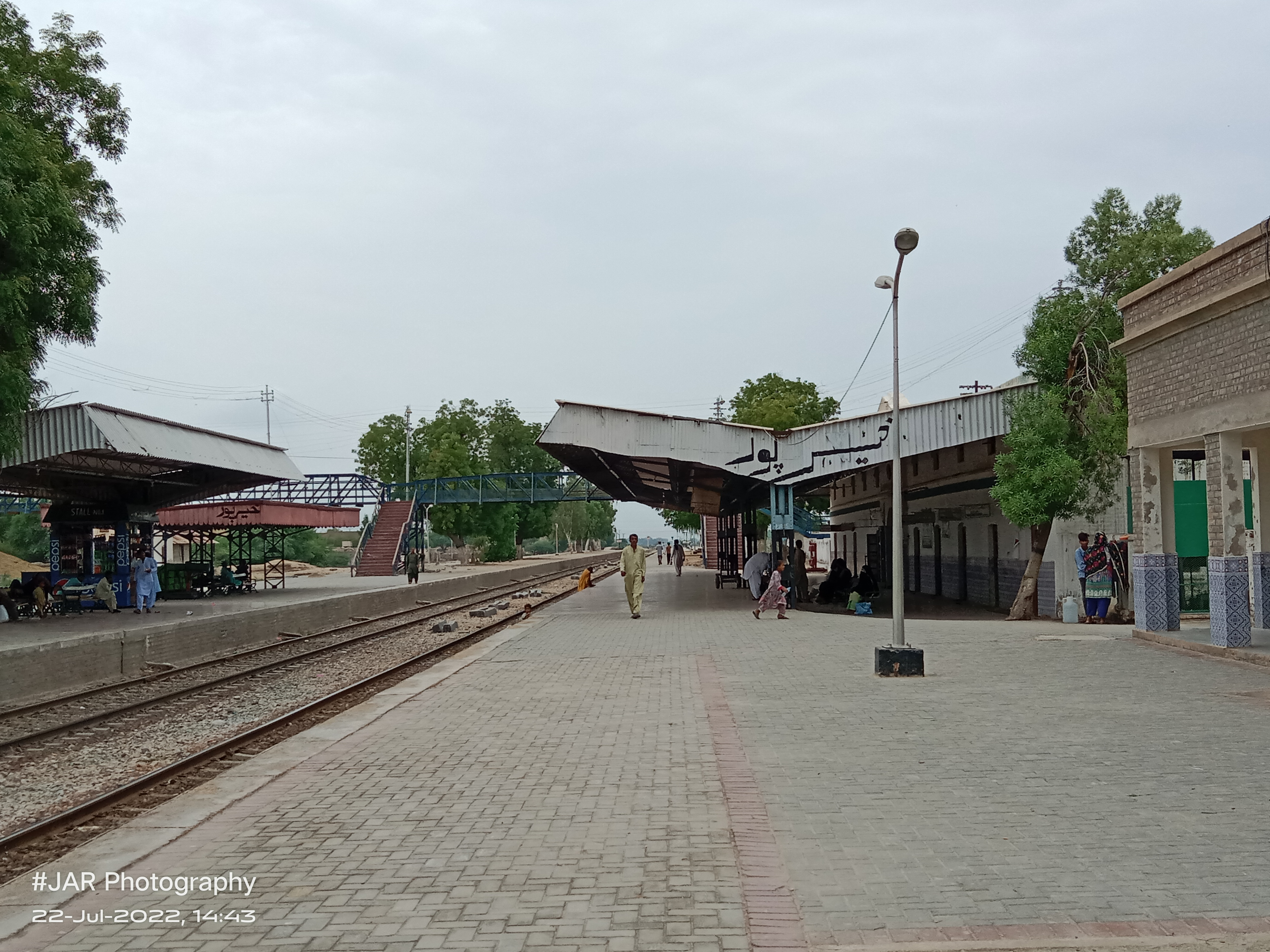

General information
- Coordinates: 27.5204°N 68.7385°E
- Owner: Ministry of Railways
- Line: Karachi–Peshawar Railway Line

Other information
- Station code: KHP

Services
Preceding station	Pakistan Railways	Following station
Tando Mustikhan towards Kiamari	Karachi–Peshawar Line	Begmanji towards Peshawar Cantonment
Location

Khairpur Railway Station (Urdu: خیرپور ریلوے اسٹیشن, Sindhi: خيرپور ريلوي اسٽيشن) is located in Khairpur city, Khairpur district of Sindh province of the Pakistan.

== See also ==
- List of railway stations in Pakistan
- Pakistan Railways
