= Walton railway station (Pakistan) =

Railway station in Punjab, Pakistan

Walton Railway Station والٹن ریلوے اسٹیشن
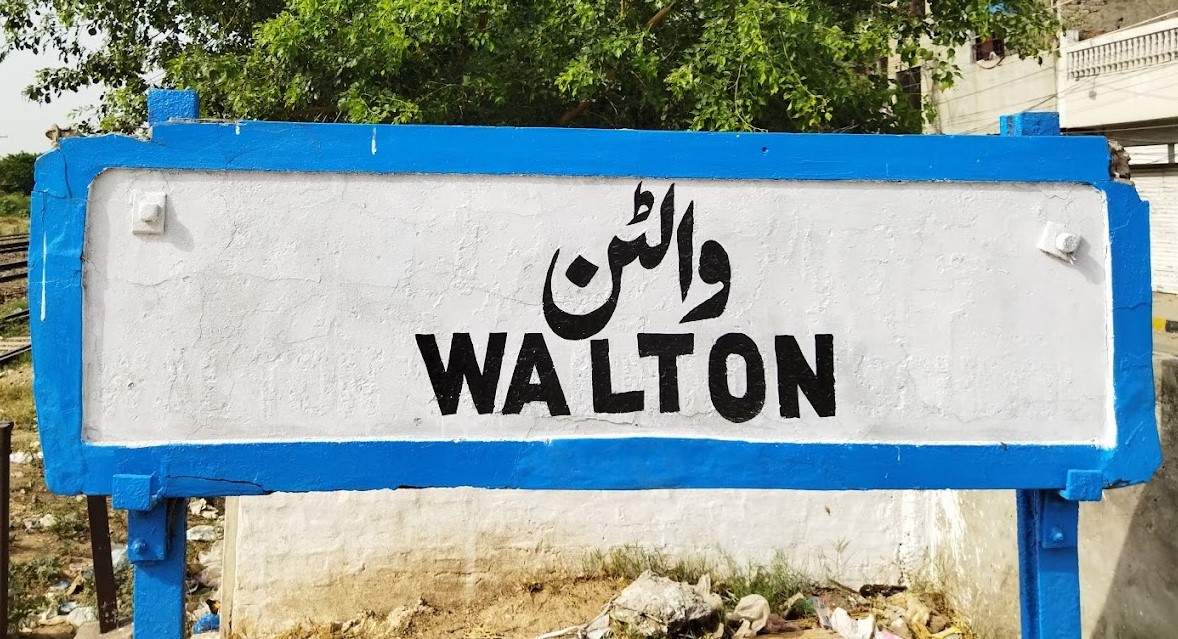

General information
- Coordinates: 31.4874°N 74.3542°E
- Owner: Ministry of Railways
- Line: Karachi–Peshawar Railway Line

Other information
- Station code: WTNS

History
- Opened: 1929
- Closed: 2026

Services
Preceding station	Pakistan Railways	Following station
Kot Lakhpat towards Kiamari	Karachi–Peshawar Line	Lahore Cantonment towards Peshawar Cantonment
Location

Walton Railway Station was a Metropolitan Railway Station (Urdu: والٹن ریلوے اسٹیشن) located in Walton cantonment, Lahore district of Pakistan's Punjab province. It is named after Sir Cusach Walton, son of Frederick Walton, a British railway engineer in pre-partition India.

In May 2025, Walton station was reported to be among 14 of Pakistan Railways' Lahore Division stations being converted to solar energy.

== History ==
In March 1930, a training school of North West Railways, now known as Pakistan Railways Academy, was founded which was inaugurated by the then Governor of the Punjab, Sir Geoffrey Fitzhervey de Montmorency.

== Incidents ==
Terrorist incidents in Pakistan in 1998

On the Tuesday morning, 10 March 1998, a bomb blast occurred here in a Lahore-bound train killing at least 10 and wounding more than 80 people. State authorities described the bomb as a timing device that was planted at an earlier stop. Pakistan blamed India for orchestrating the attack. There was no claim of responsibility.

== See also ==
- List of railway stations in Pakistan
- Pakistan Railways
