= Lahore Transport Company =

Bus company in Lahore, Pakistan

Lahore Transport Company لاہور ٹرانسپورٹ کمپنی
- Founded: 1984
- Headquarters: Lahore, Punjab, Pakistan
- Service area: Lahore
- Service type: Public transit, bus rapid transit
- Fleet: 650
- Fuel type: Petrol; CNG
- Website: ltc.gop.pk

Lahore Transport Company (LTC) (Urdu: لاہور ٹرانسپورٹ کمپنی) is a public transit bus system established for the carrying of urban passengers in Lahore, in Punjab, Pakistan.

It operates a bus rapid transit system in Lahore. However, the BRTs do not have dedicated lanes and right of privilege.

== History ==
LTC was established under the Companies Ordinance of 1984, with intention of merging several transport companies operating in Lahore together under one company. In December 2001 LTC successfully merged the various transport companies of Lahore, with the aim to develop high quality, safe, efficient, environment friendly and affordable urban transport to Lahore city residents.

Since December 2009, LTC has taken over the infrastructure and regulation responsibilities from the DRTA. LTC identified various inefficiencies in the existing routes and their alignments as they existed. Re-alignment for better management and efficiency has required an extensive survey transport study of Lahore. International consultants GTZ were selected by the Government of Punjab and completed its study in 2011.

== Services ==
LTC has planned over 53 routes for the city of Lahore, of which 30 are now operational. Lahore Transport Company has a fleet of over 650 TransLahore buses which run throughout the city. The remaining non-operational routes are being serviced by unlicensed wagons, rickshaws and qingqi's. LTC intends to reclaim all routes through affordable and efficient bus transport services. At the moment, bus transport service in Lahore is being provided by a fleet of 650 buses, almost all of which are 6 year or older in manufacturing terms. Although LTC will be replacing the entire lot of old buses with new buses, yet LTC is aware that the induction of more than 2000 buses will take some time to replace the existing Buses. In order to provide comfortable service during this intermediary switching time, LTC has planned to refurbish the existing Buses and to increase their number of each route according to a careful planned study carried out by the LTC Operations and Planning wing. LTC also issues students "Green Cards" for affordable travel.

=== Cards and Android Phone Application ===
TransLahore issues Green Card for students and Free Bus Card for elderly persons. It has also launched its Android smart phone app "Bus da pata" in Google Play Store.

== Routes ==
TransLahore buses run on 30 routes in the city as well as the neighboring suburban towns of Raiwind, Kala Shah Kaku, Shahdara and Wagah. LTC also operates mini buses and wagons as well.

== See also ==
- Transportation in Pakistan
- Transport in Lahore
- Metrobus (Lahore)
