= Badami Bagh railway station =

Railway station in Punjab, Pakistan

Badami Bagh Railway Station بادامی باغ ریلوے اسٹیشن

General information
- Coordinates: 31.5959°N 74.3171°E
- Owner: Ministry of Railways
- Line: Karachi–Peshawar Line
- Platforms: 3

Other information
- Station code: BBG

Services
Preceding station	Pakistan Railways	Following station
Lahore Junction towards Kiamari	Karachi–Peshawar Line	Shahdara Bagh Junction towards Peshawar Cantonment
Location

Badami Bagh Railway Station (Urdu and Punjabi: بادامی باغ ریلوے اسٹیشن) is located in Badami Bagh, Lahore district, in Pakistan's Punjab province.

== See also ==
- List of railway stations in Pakistan
- Pakistan Railways

== Gallery ==
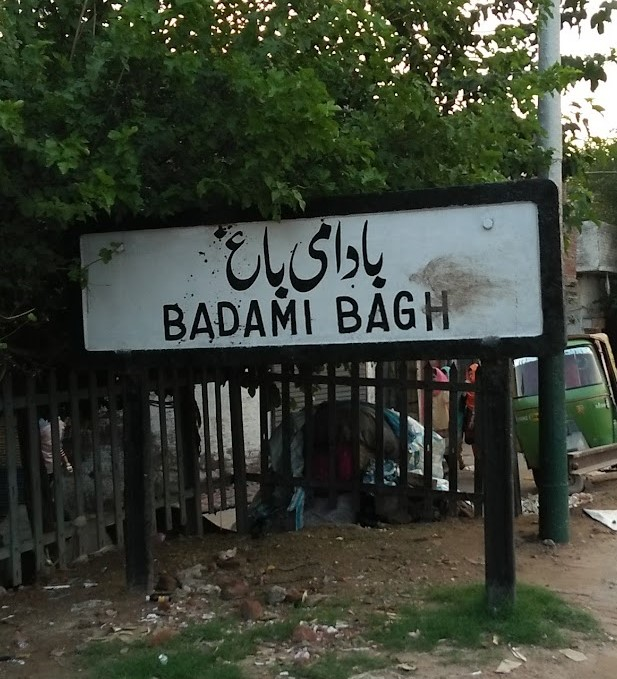
Badami bagh railway station platform board

Badami Bagh railway station tag
