= Lahore Cantonment railway station =

Railway station in Pakistan

Lahore Cantonment Station لاہور کینٹ اسٹیشن
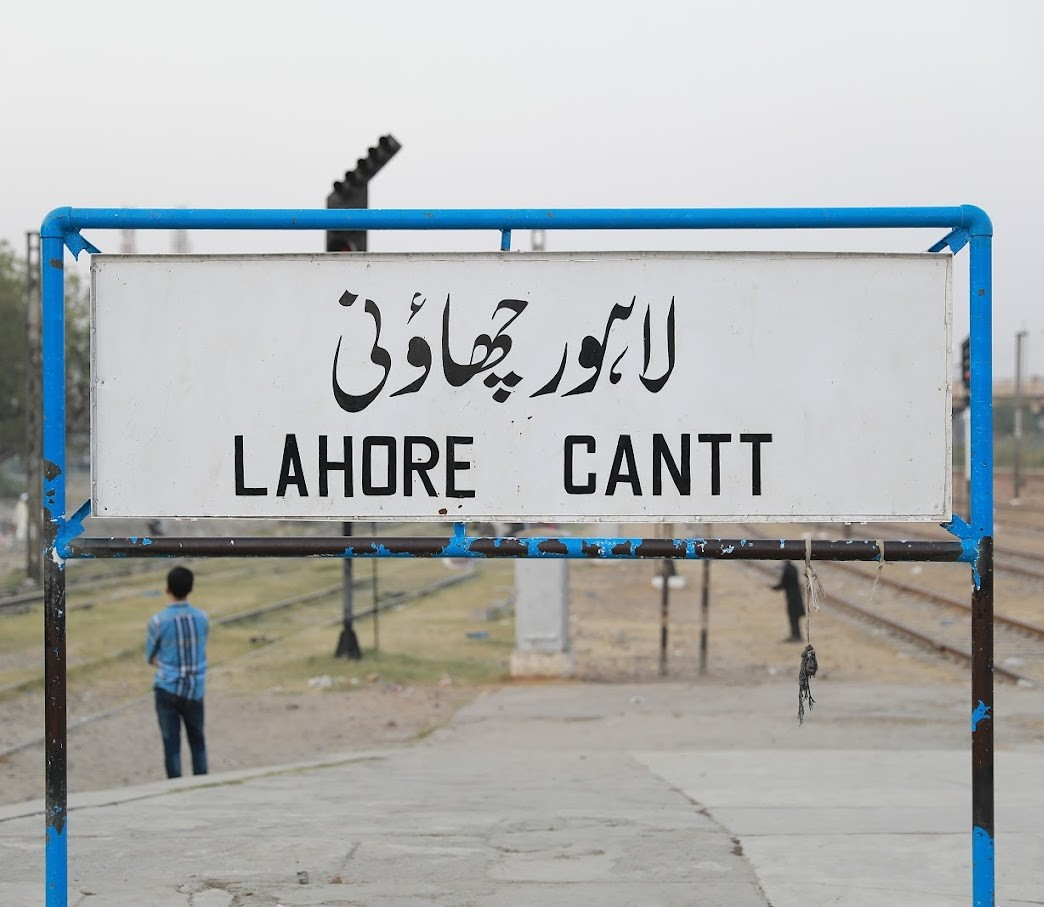

General information
- Coordinates: 31.5305°N 74.3612°E
- Owner: Ministry of Railways
- Line: Karachi–Peshawar Railway Line

Other information
- Station code: LRC

History
- Opened: 1862

Services
Preceding station	Pakistan Railways	Following station
Walton towards Kiamari	Karachi–Peshawar Line	Lahore Junction towards Peshawar Cantonment
Location

Lahore Cantonment Railway Station (Urdu and Punjabi: لاہور کینٹ ریلوے اسٹیشن) is located in Lahore Cantonment, in Lahore district of Pakistan's Punjab province.

In May 2025, Lahore Cantonment station was reported to be among 14 of Pakistan Railways' Lahore Division stations being converted to solar energy.

== See also ==
- List of railway stations in Pakistan
- Pakistan Railways
