= Tando Masti Khan railway station =

Railway station in Pakistan

Tando Mustikhan Station ٽنڊو مستي خان ريلوي اسٽيشن ٽنڊو مستي خان ريلوي اسٽيشن

General information
- Coordinates: 27.4285°N 68.6470°E
- Owner: Ministry of Railways
- Line: Karachi–Peshawar Railway Line

Other information
- Station code: TMK

Services
Preceding station	Pakistan Railways	Following station
Pir Katpar towards Kiamari	Karachi–Peshawar Line	Khairpur towards Peshawar Cantonment
Location

Tando Masti Khan Railway Station (Urdu: ٹنڈو مستی خان ریلوے اسٹیشن, Sindhi: ٽنڊو مستي خان ريلوي اسٽيشن) is located in the Khairpur district of Sindh province of Pakistan.

== See also ==
- List of railway stations in Pakistan
- Pakistan Railways
