= Pakistan Railways Academy =

Main training academy for employees of Pakistan Railways

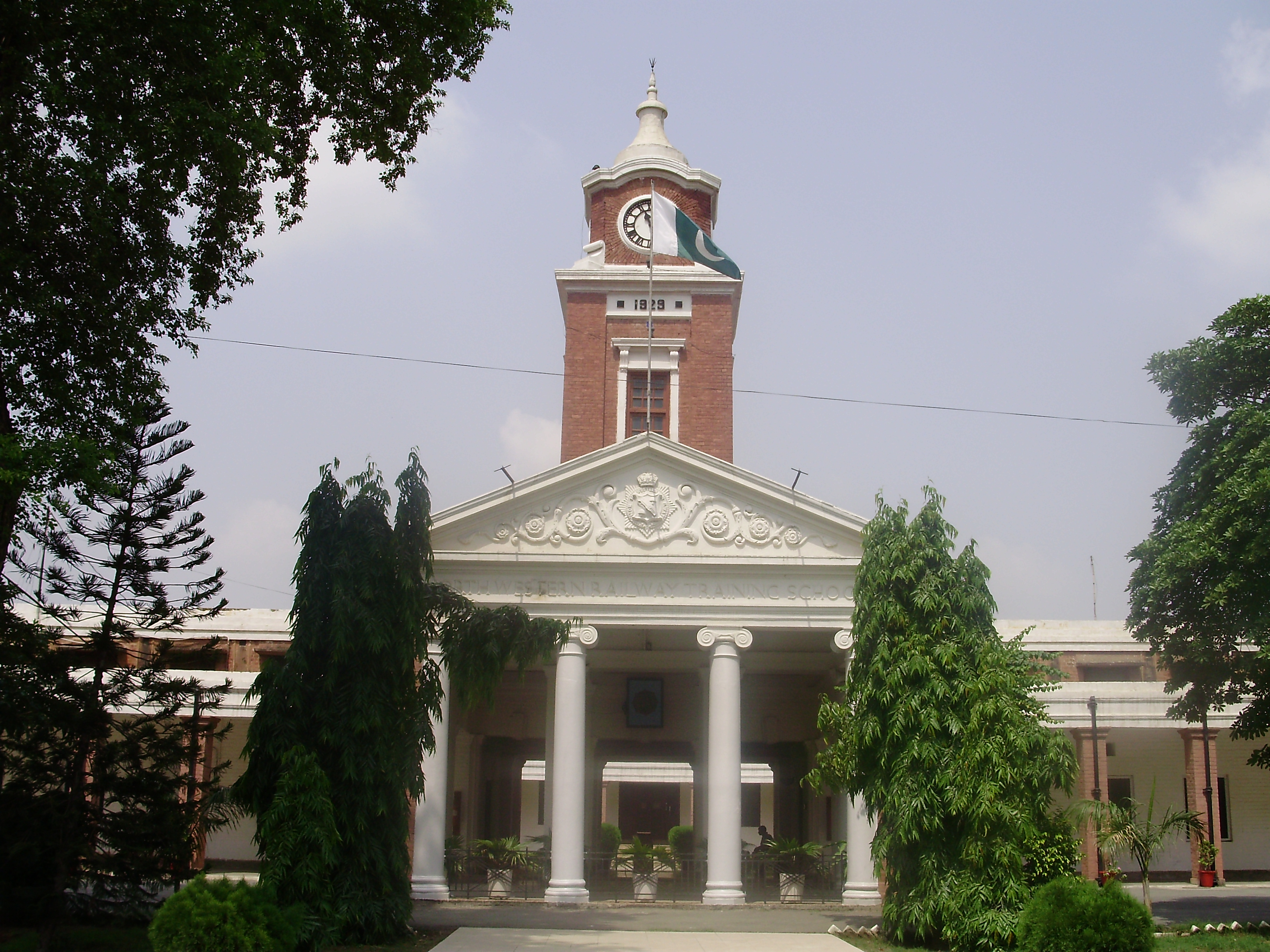
- Pakistan Railways Academy
- Formation: 1 January 1925; 101 years ago
- Headquarters: Lahore, Pakistan
- Affiliations: Pakistan Railways
- Website: pra.edu.pk

Pakistan Railways Academy (PRA) (Urdu: پاکستان ریلوے اکیڈمی) is the main training academy for employees of Pakistan Railways.

== History ==
PRA was originally established as a training school for the employees of the North Western State Railway in Lyallpur (now Faisalabad) in January 1925. The school was shifted to Walton, Lahore on 8 March 1929 and named Walton Training School after Col. C.E. Walton, who was the general manager of the North-Western State Railway at the time. In 1954, the United Nations Regional Railway Training Centre was established by ECAFE (now ESCAP) at PRA. An Advanced Railway Course was introduced for the participants from the Railways of ESCAP, the Middle East and African Region. In 1958, the Regional Railway Training Center was taken over by the government and renamed the Pakistan Inter-Regional Railway Training College' or PIRRTC. In 1983, the school was renamed Directorate of Research & Training by merging several institutions. In 2000, it was renamed to Pakistan Railways Academy. 112 courses have been completed at the school as of the year 2015. More than 1700 students are at the school from more than 40 countries.

== Departments ==
The academy arranges training courses for newly recruited officers and members of the staff of Pakistan Railways belonging to various disciplines as well as promotion and refresher courses. The training is imparted through classrooms, model rooms, replicas of the actual systems in vogue on Pakistan Railways and also exposes the students to the actual working of the PR network. The academy spreads over 31.16 hectares (77.0 acres) of land, including, 4.45 hectares (11.0 acres) area which houses 35 classrooms, 12 model rooms and labs, auditorium, library and 9 hostels.

In addition to the above following institutions are also located in the Academy:

- Pakistan Railway Police Training School
- Railway Accounts Training Center

== See also ==
- Pakistan Railways
