= Muslimaabad railway station =

Railway station in Pakistan

Coordinates: 31.5645°N 74.4054°E

Muslimaabad Halt railway station

General information
- Owner: Ministry of Railways
- Line: Lahore - Wahga Branch Line
- Platforms: no
- Tracks: single
- Connections: Station Closed

Construction
- Structure type: demolished
- Parking: no

Other information
- Station code: MLMD
- Fare zone: Lahore

History
- Former names: Great Indian Peninsula Railway

Services
Closed
Location

Muslimaabad railway station (Urdu: مسلم آباد ریلوے اسٹیشن) is located in Pakistan.

== See also ==
- List of railway stations in Pakistan
- Pakistan Railways
