= Kot Lakhpat railway station =

Railway station in Kot Lakhpat, Pakistan

Kot Lakhpat Railway Station کوٹ لکھپت ریلوے اسٹیشن
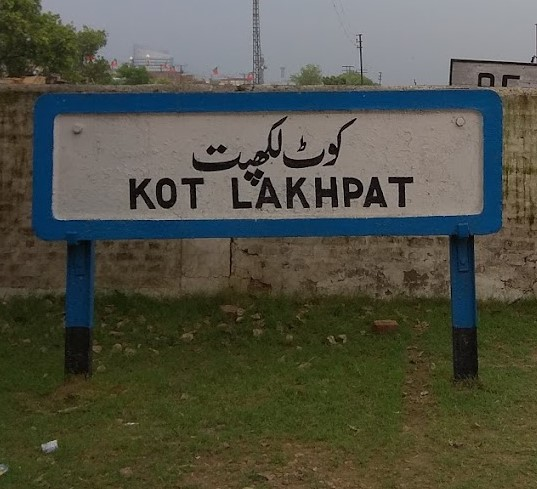

General information
- Coordinates: 31.4594°N 74.3385°E
- Owner: Ministry of Railways
- Line: Karachi–Peshawar Railway Line
- Platforms: 2
- Tracks: 4

Construction
- Parking: yes

Other information
- Station code: LKP

Services
Preceding station	Pakistan Railways	Following station
Kana Kacha towards Kiamari	Karachi–Peshawar Line	Walton towards Peshawar Cantonment
Location

Kot Lakhpat Railway Station (Urdu and Punjabi: کوٹ لکھپت ریلوے اسٹیشن) is located in Kot Lakhpat town, Lahore district of Punjab province, Pakistan. Owned by the Ministry of Railways, it is a sub-station of Lahore with two platforms.

In May 2025, Kot Lakhpat station was reported to be among 14 of Pakistan Railways' Lahore Division stations being converted to solar energy.

== See also ==
- List of railway stations in Pakistan
- Pakistan Railways
