= Wagah railway station =

Railway station in Pakistan

Wagah Railway Station واہگہ ریلوے اسٹیشن
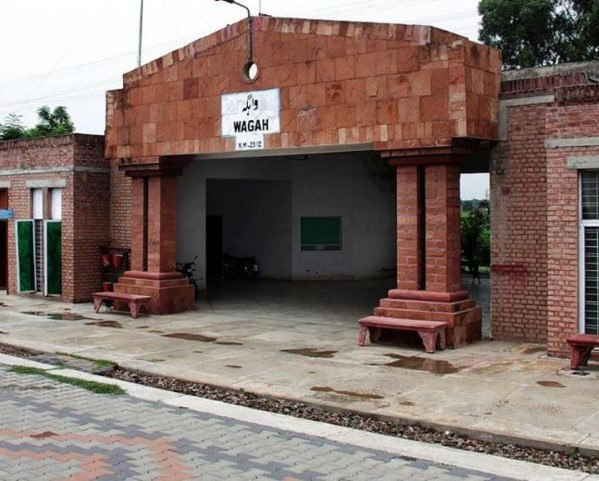

General information
- Location: Bahnu Chak Road, Wagah, Punjab 53600
- Coordinates: 31.5905°N 74.5758°E
- Owner: Ministry of Railways
- Line: Lahore–Wagah Branch Line
- Platforms: 2

Other information
- Station code: WGH
- Fare zone: Pakistan

History
- Former names: Pakistan Railway

Services
Preceding station	Pakistan Railways	Following station
Taqipur towards Lahore Junction	Lahore–Wagah Branch Line	Terminus
Location
- Location within Punjab, Pakistan Location within Pakistan

Wagah Railway Station (Urdu and Punjabi: واہگہ ریلوے اسٹیشن) is located in Wagah, Punjab, Pakistan. It is the last station in Pakistan on the Lahore–Wagah Branch Line and serves as the border station before crossing into India. Wagah serves as a sub-urban station of Lahore and is also used for immigration and Customs of passengers who travel between India and Pakistan via Samjhauta Express.

== See also ==
- Koh-e-Taftan railway station
- Atari railway station
