= Ranbir Singh =

Ranbir Singh or Ranabir Singh may refer to

- Ranbir Singh (actor), Indian actor.
- Ranbir Singh (general), General Officer Commander-in-Chief Northern Command of the Indian Army
- Ranbir Singh (jurist), Vice-Chancellor of National Law University, Delhi
- Ranbir Singh (Maharaja) (1830–1885), Maharaja of Jammu and Kashmir
- Ranbir Singh Bisht (1928–1998), Indian painter
- Ranbir Singh Gangwa (born 1964), Indian politician
- Ranbir Singh Jind (1879–1948), Maharaja of Jind
- Ranbir Singh Mahendra, Indian politician
- Ranabir Singh Thapa, Nepalese Army General, prominent politician and minister of state
- Ranbir Singh Suri, Baron Suri (born 1935), Conservative life peer in the United Kingdom's House of Lords
- Chaudhary Ranbir Singh Hooda, Indian politician
- Chaudhary Ranbir Singh University in Jind, Haryana, India
- Raj Kumar Ranbir Singh, Chief Minister of Manipur, India
- Ranbir Singh of Jammu and Kashmir, Maharaja of Jammu and Kashmir from 1856 until his death in 1885
- Ranbir Singh Pora, constituency under Jammu district notified area committee in Jammu district in the Indian Union territory of Jammu and Kashmir
- Rana Ranbir, Indian actor
- Rajkumar Ranbir Singh, former Chief Minister of Manipur, India
- Ranbir Bhullar, Indian MLA of Punjab from Aam Aadmi Party
- Ranvir Singh, fictional character played by Saif Ali Khan in the 2008 Indian film Race
- Ranvir Singh Rathod, fictional police inspector played by Danny Denzongpa in the 1982 Indian film Khule-Aam
