= Ranbir =

Ranbir may refer to:

== People ==
- Rana Ranbir, Indian actor in Punjabi cinema
- Ranbir Kapoor (born 1982), Indian actor who appears in Bollywood films (filmography)
- Ranbir Singh GCSI, CIE, Kaiser-i-Hind (1830–1885), the son of Maharaja Gulab Singh, Maharaja of Jammu and Kashmir
- Ranbir Singh Hooda (1914–2009), leading member of the Indian National Congress; played a role in India's freedom struggle
- Ranbir Singh Kanwar (born 1930), plant breeder and agronomist who helped usher in the green revolution in India
- Ranbir Singh Latayan (born 1925), Indian chemist, academic administrator and politician
- Ranbir Singh Mahendra, politician from Haryana, India and a former president of the BCCI
- Ranbir Singh of Jind (1879–1948), the first Maharaja of Jind and the last ruler of the state of Jind, reigning from 1887 to 1948

== Others ==
- Ranaweera, a Sinhalese surname
- Ranbir (newspaper), newspaper in Jammu, India
- Ranbir pura, small village in Patiala District, Punjab, India near the Bhakhra Canal on Sangrur Road and also on Nabha road
- Ranbir Rano, Hindi television series on Zee TV channel from September 22, 2008 – May 28, 2009
- Ranbir Singh Pora, town and a notified area committee in Jammu district in the Indian state of Jammu and Kashmir
- Ranveer, alternative spelling of the Indian male given name
