= GKO (disambiguation) =

GKO may refer to:

- GKO (Russian: Государственное Краткосрочное Обязательство, Gosudarstvennoye Kratkosrochnoye Obyazatyelstvo), a Russian bond issued in the mid-1990s
- Ancient Greek language
- GKO construction, in conformal field theory
- Gunna Kalan railway station, in Pakistan
- Kok-Nar language
- State Defense Committee (Russian: Государственный комитет обороны, Gosudarstvennyj komitet oborony) of the USSR
