= Pratap Singh of Jammu and Kashmir =

Maharaja of Jammu and Kashmir from 1885 to 1925

Sir Pratap Singh GCSI GCIE GBE
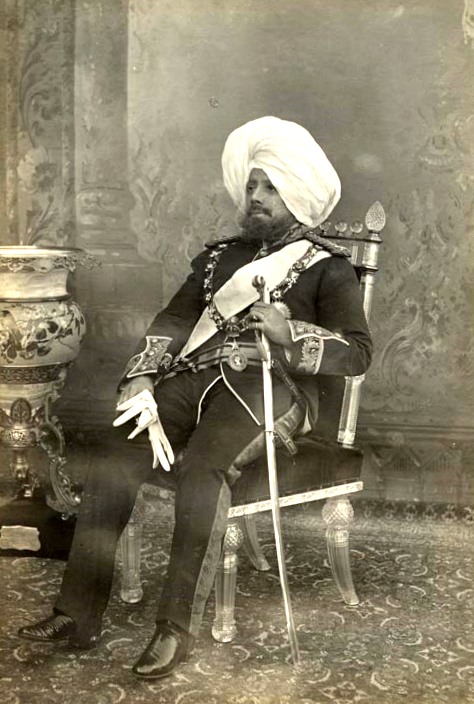
- Pratap Singh in 1900

Maharaja of Jammu and Kashmir
- Reign: 12 September 1885 – 23 September 1925
- Predecessor: Ranbir Singh
- Successor: Hari Singh
- Born: 18 July 1848; Jammu, Jammu and Kashmir, British India (Company Raj)
- Died: 23 September 1925 (aged 77); Reasi, Jammu and Kashmir, British India (British Raj)
- House: Dogra
- Father: Maharaja Ranbir Singh I of Jammu and Kashmir
- Mother: Maharani Shubh Devi of Siba State
- Religion: Hinduism

Pratap Singh (18 July 1848 – 23 September 1925) was the Maharaja of Jammu and Kashmir, and head of the Jamwal Rajput clan of the ruling Dogra dynasty.

He was succeeded as Maharaja by his nephew, Hari Singh, in 1925.

== Succession ==
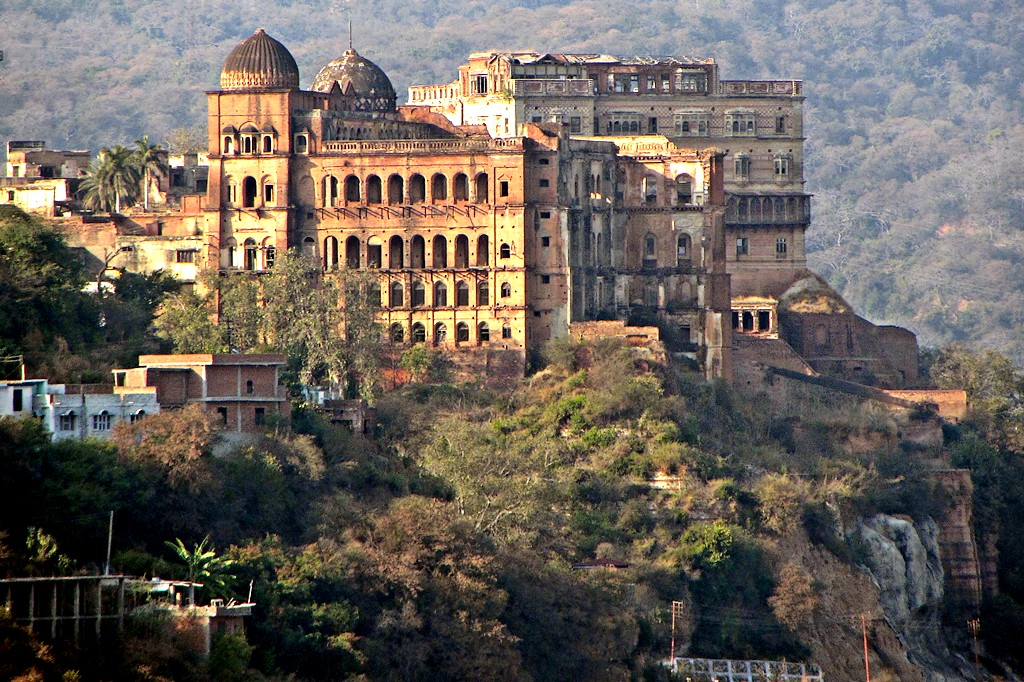
The Mubarak Mandi Palace at Jammu

Jammu and Kashmir was a self-governing salute state, outside British India, but in a subsidiary alliance with it.

In the years before 1885, the British Governor-General of India was represented in Kashmir by an Officer-on-Special-Duty, who had only limited functions. The Government of British India made many attempts in the days of Ranbir Singh to raise the status of this Officer to that of a fully-fledged Political Resident. It was concerned that having no Resident gave the Maharaja a free hand in his dealings with states outside India, in particular Russia. However, these were successfully resisted.

In 1882, and again in 1884, Ranbir Singh asked the British to nominate his younger son, Amar Singh, as his successor, stating that Amar was wiser than his brothers Pratap and Ram Singh. However, the Governor-General, Lord Ripon, decided that Pratap Singh would succeed his father, and that a Resident would be appointed. Ranbir died on 12 September 1885, and the next day the Officer-on-Special Duty, Oliver St John, announced that Pratap was recognized as ruler and that at the same time he was himself promoted to Resident. Pratap appealed to the new Governor-General, Lord Dufferin, against this promotion, which he said would lower his own status. Dufferin rejected the appeal, while assuring Pratap that as Resident St John would not interfere improperly with his administration and would offer friendly advice. Ultimately, Pratap accepted what had happened.

== Pratap Singh's reign ==
In 1887, an early action of Pratap Singh’s State Government was to implement the first land settlement, with the rights of the farmers being clearly defined, and the state's demand fixed for ten years. In Kashmir, peasants were forced to engage in "Begar", an objectionable form of forced labour. As part of veth, the peasants and low-caste people were forced to supply water to the ruler's family; construct buildings, roads, and dams; and carry dead and wounded soldiers. It was abolished by the Maharaja. In 1894, the Maharaja granted full propriety rights over wastelands in favour of Dogra Rajputs on moderate terms including absolute exemption from Begar.

In 1889, the British deposed Pratap Singh as ruler, accusing him of misgovernment, disloyal dealings with the Russian Empire, and a plot to murder his brothers and the British Resident. However, this was contrary to the Treaty of Amritsar of 1846, and the outcome of it was that Pratap was reinstated, but a new ruling council was forced on him, which included his brother Amar Singh working under the supervision of the British Resident.

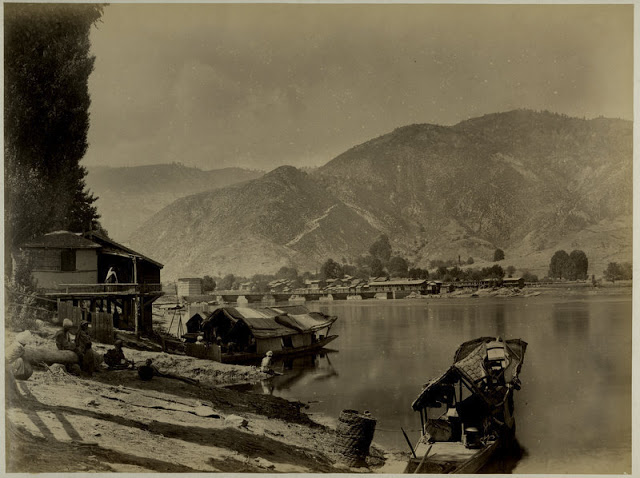
The Jhelum at Baramulla in the 1880s

In 1889, a major step of improvement was taken when the Jhelum Valley Cart Road, from Kohala to Baramulla, "the most wonderful mountain road in the world", was completed, and a new Kohala Bridge the next year. In 1897 this road was extended to Srinagar. During the reign of Pratap Singh, many other new roads were built in the state, including those from Srinagar to Gilgit in Baltistan and Leh in Ladakh. The impact on the lives of the people of the state was enormous, as before Pratap Singh’s time there had not been a single wheeled conveyance which could travel from one place to another, not even a hand-cart. Consequently, the Jhelum River was important for transportation. By the time the reign of Pratap came to a close, motor cars had become a major means of travel.

Besides construction of roads, several efforts were made to link the Kashmir Valley with the Indian railway system, but progress was slow, owing to the high costs. Projects to build forty-six miles of light railway from Jammu to Srinagar, and a seventy-nine-mile long mono-steel-cableway from Jammu to Doru Shahabad, did not come to fruition. However, in 1890 the Jammu–Sialkot line was built from Jammu to Sialkot in the Punjab Province of British India, becoming the first railway in Jammu and Kashmir.

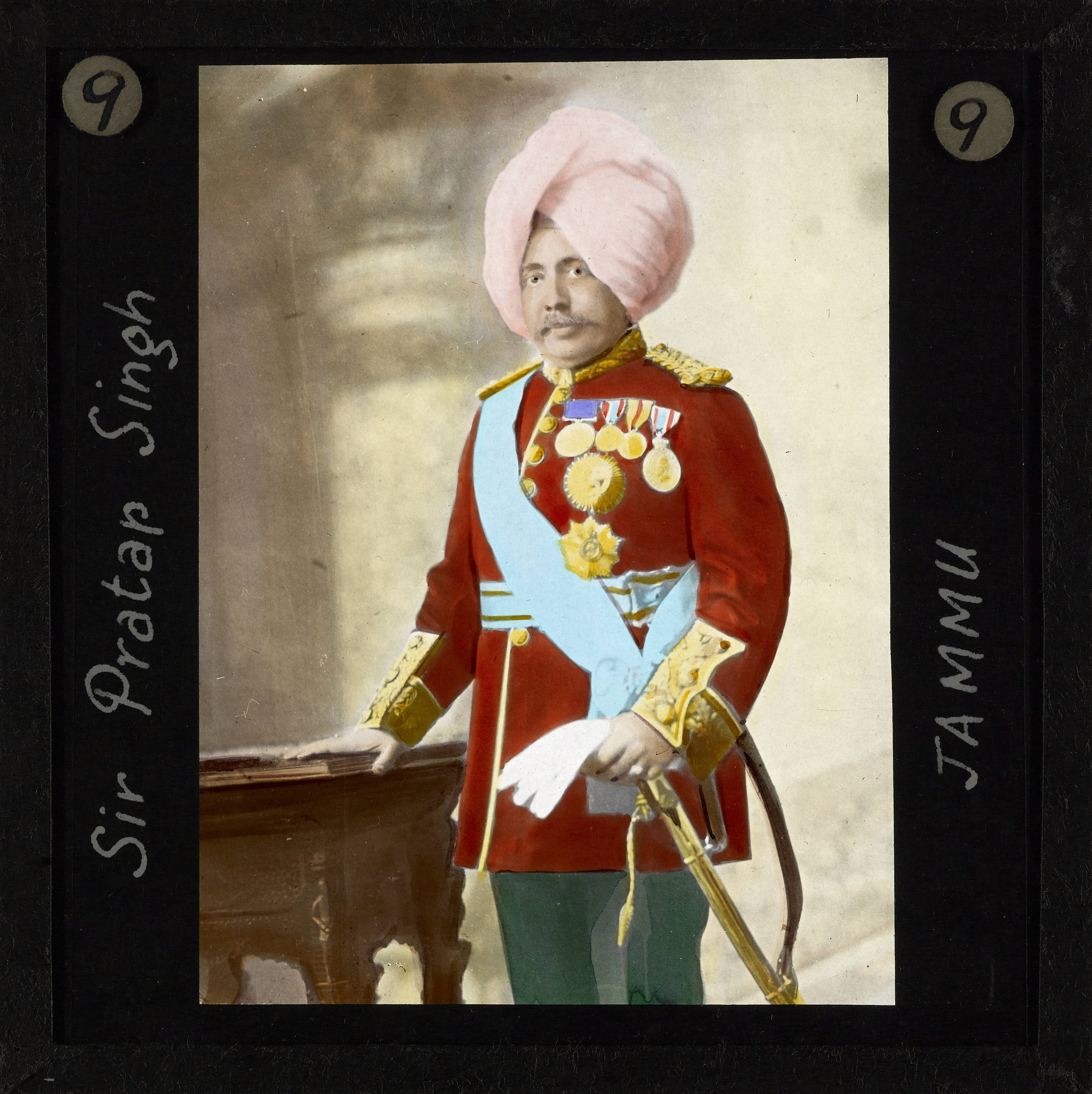
Maharaja Pratap Singh, about 1890

In 1894, widespread vaccination was introduced to prevent smallpox, which before that had taken a heavy toll of life in the valley. Modern water works were also established at Jammu and Srinagar. The Church Missionary Society, which had been set up in Kashmir in the time of Maharaja Ranbir Singh, also contributed much to the promotion of public health and education. It opened its own schools and hospitals in the valley and ran them on modern lines.

In 1898, Pratap allowed for the construction of the Shri Pratap Singh Museum in Srinagar. By 1912 practically every tehsil and district was settled either for the first time or in revision. The share of the state was fixed at 30 per cent of the gross produce, and the revenue was to be collected in cash. The land settlement gave much needed security to the cultivators and became responsible for their increasing prosperity. The revenues of the state also increased, as a result.

A model agricultural farm was set up at Srinagar for the spread of knowledge about the scientific methods of cultivation. Establishment of the Department of Agriculture and the introduction of Cooperative Societies were the other measures taken up to further improve the lot of the cultivators. By 1929, the number of Cooperative Credit Societies in the state alone rose to about 1100 with a membership of 27,500.

Till the accession of Pratap Singh, practically nothing had been done to exploit the forests of Jammu and Kashmir on scientific lines. In 1891, the subsidiary princely state established the Forest Department which soon began to give a very good account of itself. Its surplus revenue for the first year was about a quarter million of rupees. The same rose to about two million for the year 1921–22 and to a record figure of about five million for the year 1929–30.

Efforts were made to popularise education. In pursuance of the suggestions made in the report of 1916, many changes were made in the system of education. A number of new schools for both boys and girls were also opened. The imparting of education in the primary schools was made free. Several measures were taken for the education of the poor populace of the Muslim community. Grants were provided for the training of unqualified teachers at the Training College and schools at Lahore.

One degree college at each capital, that is, Prince of Wales College, Jammu, established in 1907, Sri Pratap College, Srinagar, established in 1905, the Amar Singh Technical Institute, Srinagar (1914), and the Sri Pratap Technical School, Jammu (1924), were maintained to meet the demands for higher education. By 1938, Sri Pratap College, with 1187 students on its rolls, was the second largest college affiliated to the University of the Punjab.

Modern hospitals for both males and females were also established at Srinagar and Jammu. In other towns and important villages, medical dispensaries under the charge of qualified doctors were opened. These establishments went a long way in improving the health of the people.

A great spill channel was constructed in 1904 to divert the flood waters of the Jhelum River. It was followed by the construction of smaller channels and several irrigation canals in both the provinces of Jammu and Kashmir. The longest and most important of these was the Ranbir Canal in Jammu with a total length of 251 miles including that of its tributaries. It was fully completed in 1911 at the cost of Rs. 3,536,714. This Canal also helped in propelling the turbines of the Jammu hydro-electric installation. Besides, 250 tanks were constructed in the Kandi areas of Jammu with a view to removing the great distress of the residents of these arid tracks. The power obtained from the hydro-electric works established at Mohara in 1907 was used not only for lighting and industrial purposes but also for dredging operations which were carried out in the Jhelum below Baramulla to remove silt and boulders.

Besides, agriculture, sericulture, viticulture and horticulture were given great encouragement, and these made much progress going onto become flourishing state industries. A silk factory set up at Srinagar attained the distinction of being "the largest of its kind in the world". To feed it with the best quality of cocoons, worms were imported from Italy and France.

A beginning was made in local self-government by establishing municipalities at Jammu, Srinagar, Sopore and Baramulla. These organisations did a lot towards improving the local sanitary conditions. From 1919 the State Forest Department undertook to supply firewood to the city people at fixed rates to alleviate the fuel crisis of the Srinagar residents. Many oppressive taxes, including the Muslims Marriage Tax, were abolished. Certain State Monopolies such as the shawl industry were also done away with.

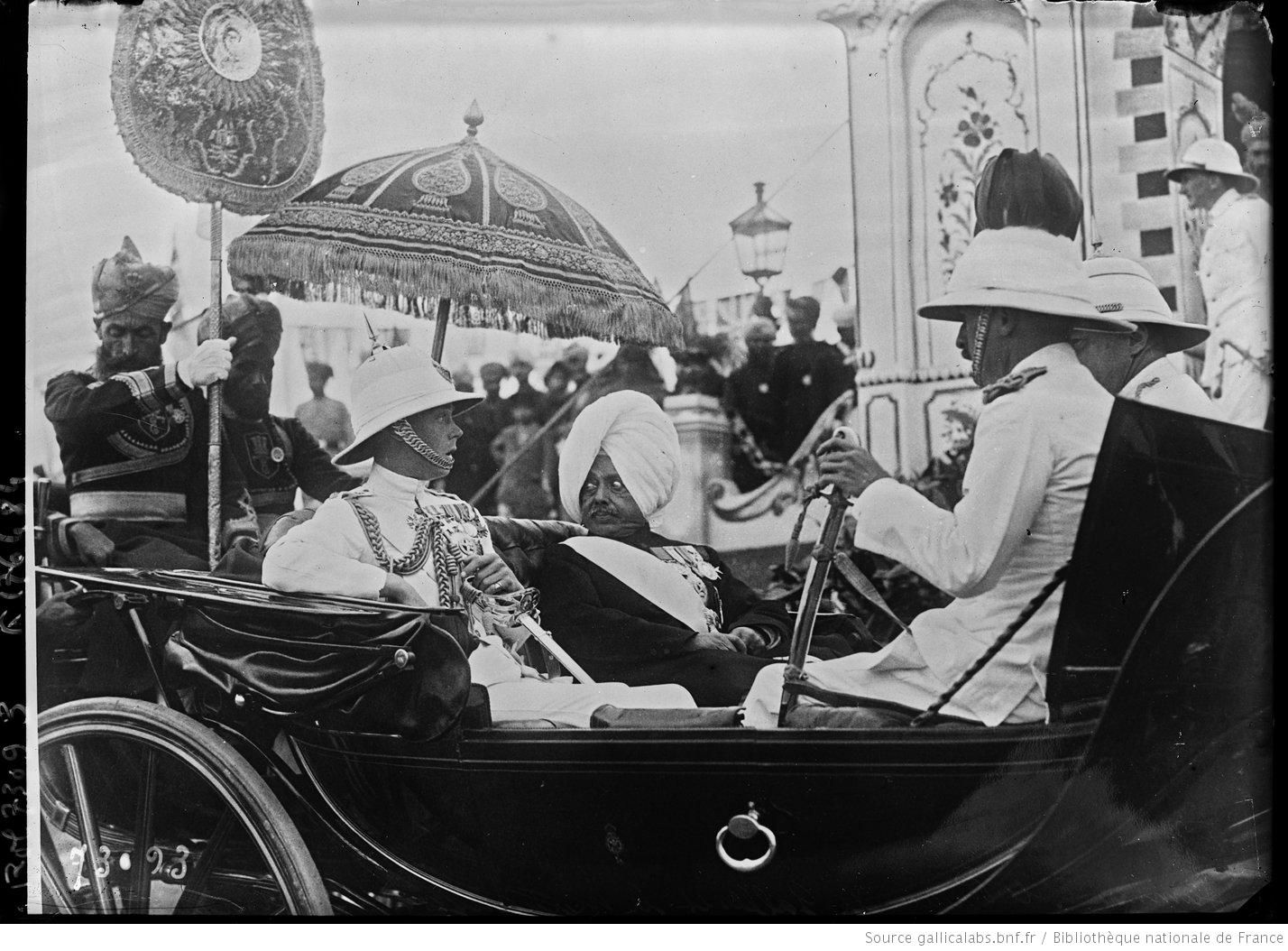
Pratap with the Prince of Wales, 1922

The Maharaja of Jammu and Kashmir was granted new imperial honours as a result of the meritorious services of Dogra soldiers during the First World War. In 1921 he was also upgraded to a permanent and hereditary 21-gun salute, from a 19-gun salute.

In 1922, another great highway, the Banihal Cart Road, which connected Srinagar, the summer capital, with Jammu, the winter capital of the state, was completed and opened.

Pratap Singh left no surviving children of his own when he died during a stay at Reasi on 23 September 1925, and he was succeeded by his nephew Hari Singh, son of Raja Amar Singh.

== Honours ==
- Prince of Wales's Gold Medal, 1876
- Empress of India Gold Medal, 1877
- Knight Grand Commander of the Order of the Star of India (GCSI), 1892
- Delhi Durbar Gold Medal, 1903
- Delhi Durbar Gold Medal, 1911
- Knight Grand Commander of the Order of the Indian Empire (GCIE), 1911
- Bailiff Grand Cross of the Order of St John (GCStJ), 1916
- Hon. LL.D (Panjab University), 1917
- Knight Grand Cross of the Order of the British Empire (GBE), 1918

== Bibliography ==
- Rai, Mridu (2004), Hindu Rulers, Muslim Subjects: Islam, Rights, and the History of Kashmir, C. Hurst & Co., ISBN 1850656614

Pratap Singh of Jammu and Kashmir Dogra dynasty Born: 18 July 1848 Died: 23 September 1925
Regnal titles
Preceded by Ranbir Singh	Maharaja of Jammu and Kashmir; 1885–1925	Succeeded by Hari Singh
