= Ragbir =

Ragbir may refer to:

- Ragbir Bhathal, Australian astronomer and author
- Rai Ragbir, Trinidad and Tobago politician

== See also ==
- Ranbir
