= Sialkot Junction railway station =

Railway station in Sialkot, Pakistan

Sialkot Junction Railway Station سیالکوٹ جنکشن ریلوے اسٹیشن
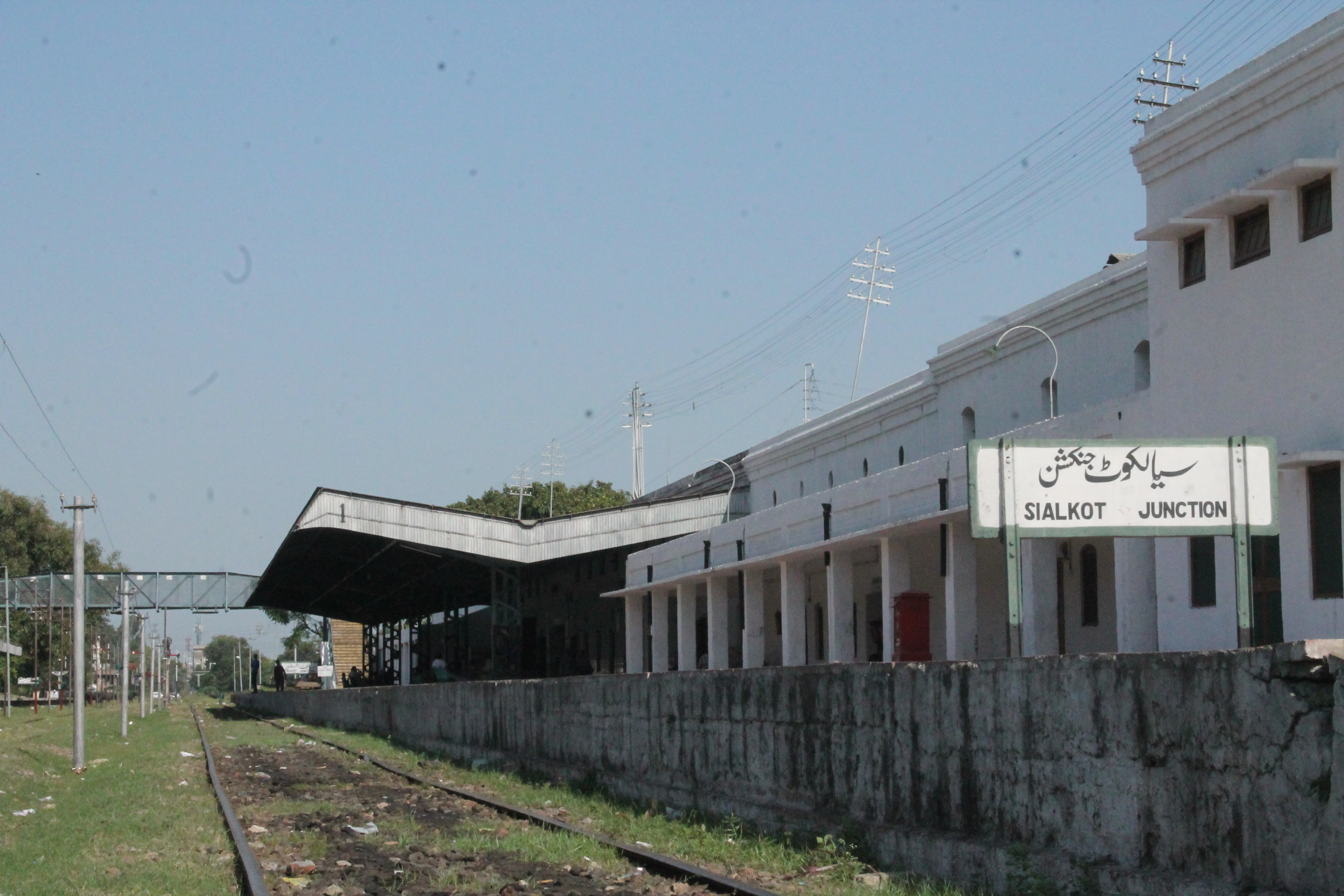
- Station entrance

General information
- Location: Railway Road, Sialkot
- Coordinates: 32.4981°N 74.5406°E
- Owner: Ministry of Railways
- Lines: Wazirabad–Narowal Branch Line; Jammu–Sialkot line (defunct)
- Platforms: 3
- Tracks: 5

Construction
- Platform levels: 1
- Parking: Available
- Accessible: Available

Other information
- Station code: SLK

History
- Opened: 1880
- Rebuilt: 1971

Passengers
- 0.5 million

Services
| Preceding station | Pakistan Railways | Following station |
|---|---|---|
| Ugoke towards Wazirabad Junction | Wazirabad–Narowal Branch Line | Tasirabad Halt towards Narowal Junction |
| Sialkot Cantonment towards Jammu | Jammu–Sialkot line (defunct) | Terminus |
Location

Sialkot Junction Railway Station (Urdu: سیالکوٹ جنکشن ریلوے اسٹیشن, Punjabi: سیالکوٹ جنکشن ریلوے اسٹیشن) is the main railway station in Sialkot on the Wazirabad–Narowal Branch Line.

== History ==
Sialkot Junction station was opened in 1880, following the inauguration of the Sialkot–Jammu Branch Line. In 1905, Wazirabad–Narowal Branch Line was completed and connected Sialkot to Karachi and Peshawar.

The Sialkot-Jammu Branch Line was disconnected on 18 September 1947 after the partition of India.

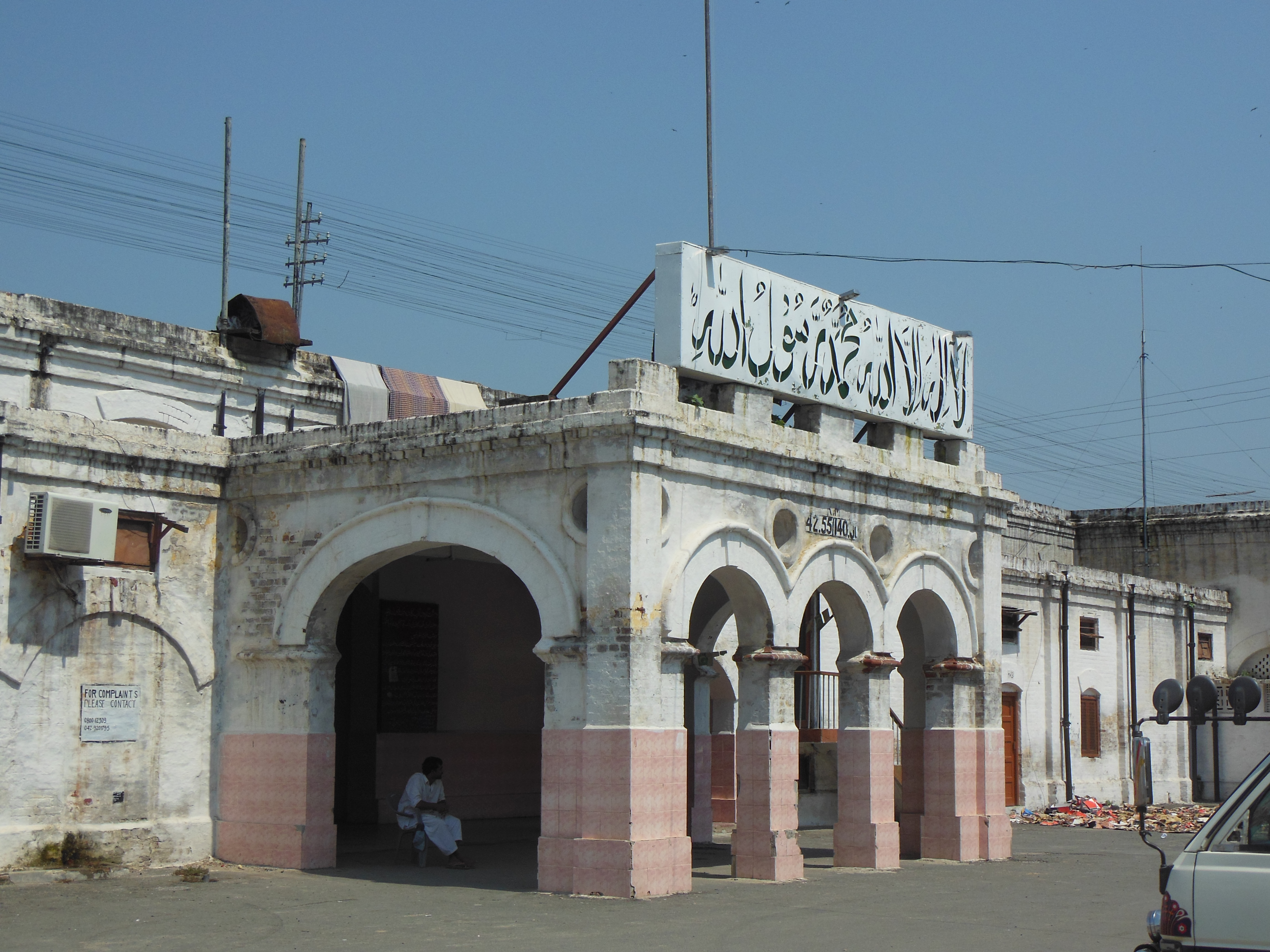

== Services ==
The following trains stop/terminate/originate at Sialkot Junction station:

| Preceding station | Pakistan Railways | Following station |
|---|---|---|
| Chawinda towards Karachi Cantonment | Allama Iqbal Express | Terminus |

== See also ==
- List of railway stations in Pakistan
- Pakistan Railways
- Sialkot
- Sialkot International Airport
