= Khore, India =

Khore
- Tehsil
- Location in Jammu and Kashmir, India Khore (India)
- Coordinates: 32.846°N 74.460°E
- Country: India
- Union Territory: Jammu and Kashmir
- District: Jammu

Population (2011)
  - Total: 6,931

Languages
  - Official: English, Dogri
- Time zone: UTC+5:30 (IST)

Khore is a town in Jammu district in the Indian union territory of Jammu and Kashmir. It is located close to the Line of Control.

== Demographics ==
As of 2011 India census, Khour had a population of 6,931 with 1,592 no of households. Males constitute 51% of the population and females 49%. Khour has an average literacy rate of 82.31%, higher than the national average of 74%: male literacy is 89.46%, and female literacy is 75.14%. In Khour, 12.23% of the population is under 6 years of age.

According to the 2011 census, 98.11% of the population was Hindu, with the remainder mostly being made up by Muslims (0.79%), Christians (0.72%) and Sikhs (0.13%).

Religion in Khour (2011)
1. Hinduism (98.1%)
2. Islam (0.79%)
3. Christianity (0.72%)
4. Sikhism (0.13%)
5. Not Stated (0.25%)
