= Dehargaha =

- village
- Country: India
- State: Jammu and Kashmir
- District: Jammu

Population (2011)
  - Total: 523

Languages
  - Official: Urdu
- Time zone: UTC+5:30 (IST)

Dehargaha is a village in the northern union territory of Jammu and Kashmir, India. It is located in the Akhnoor taluk of Jammu district.
