= Begowala Ghartal railway station =

Railway station in Punjab, Pakistan

Begowala Ghartal Railway Station بیگووالا ریلوے اسٹیشن

General information
- Coordinates: 32.4638°N 74.2860°E
- Owner: Ministry of Railways
- Line: Wazirabad–Narowal Branch Line

Other information
- Station code: BGW

Services
Preceding station	Pakistan Railways	Following station
Sodhra Kopra towards Wazirabad Junction	Wazirabad–Narowal Branch Line	Sambrial towards Narowal Junction
Location

Begowala Railway Station (Urdu: بیگووالا ریلوے اسٹیشن, Punjabi: بیگووالا ریلوے اسٹیشن)is located in Begowala town, Sialkot district of Punjab province, Pakistan. The station provides transport to major cities in Punjab.

== See also ==
- List of railway stations in Pakistan
- Pakistan Railways
