= Wazirabad–Narowal Branch Line =

Railway line in Pakistan

Wazirabad–Narowal Branch Line وزِيرآباد-نارووال فرعی ریلوے خط

Overview
- Owner: Pakistan Railways
- Termini: Wazirabad Junction; Narowal Junction
- Stations: 11

Service
- Operator: Pakistan Railways

History
- Opened: 22 July 1915

Technical
- Line length: 91 km (57 mi)
- Track gauge: 1,676 mm (5 ft 6 in)
- Operating speed: 30 km/h (19 mph) to 50 km/h (31 mph)

Wazirabad–Narowal Branch Line (Urdu: وزِيرآباد-نارووال فرعی ریلوے خط) is one of several branch lines in Pakistan, operated and maintained by Pakistan Railways. The line originally runs from Wazirabad Junction station to Narowal Junction station. The total length of this railway line is 105 kilometers (65 mi). There are 11 railway stations from Wazirabad Junction to Narowal Junction.

== History ==
The Wazirabad–Narowal Branch Line was built by the North Western State Railway in 1915 and originally named as the Sialkot–Narowal Railway.

== Stations ==
- Wazirabad Junction
- Ghakka Mittar (Abandoned)
- Sodhra Kopra
- Begowala Ghartal (Abandoned)
- Sambrial
- Sahowala (Abandoned)
- Ugoki
- Sialkot Junction
- Tasirabad Halt (Abandoned)
- Gunna Kalan
- Alhar (Abandoned)
- Chawinda
- Pasrur
- Qila Sobha Singh
- Alipur Sayadan Sharif (Abandoned)
- Domala
- Narowal Junction

== See also ==
- Pakistan Railways
