= Jammu–Sialkot line =

Railway line in India

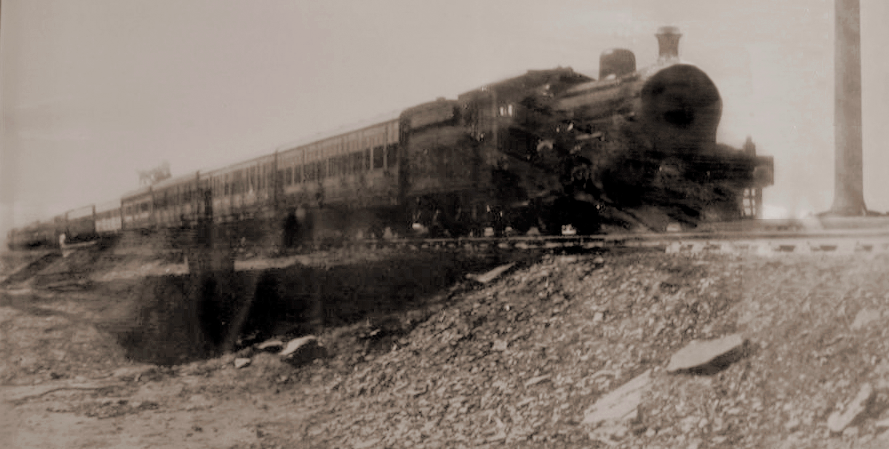
- The first train to Jammu from Sialkot, 1890 courtesy of searchkashmir.org

Overview
- Status: Discontinued
- Locale: Jammu and Kashmir, Punjab
- Termini: Jammu Bikram Chowk; Sialkot Junction

Service
- Type: Regional rail
- Operator(s): North Western Railway

History
- Opened: 1890
- Closed: 1947

Technical
- Track length: 43 km (27 mi)
- Number of tracks: 1
- Track gauge: Narrow Gauge

The Jammu–Sialkot line was a 43 km (27 mi) broad gauge branch of the North Western State Railway from Wazirabad Junction, Punjab, to Jammu, passing through the Sialkot Junction. The section from Sialkot to Jammu (Bikram Chowk) was 27 miles (43 km) long, partly in the British Indian province of Punjab and partly in the princely state of Jammu and Kashmir Built in 1890 during the reign of Maharaja Pratap Singh, it was the first railway line in the state of Jammu and Kashmir.

The railway line ran till 18 September 1947, when the newly independent Pakistan, which inherited the North Western State Railway from British India, suspended the train service. The railway line fell into disrepair. A new line between Pathankot and Jammu was built by Indian Railways in 1972.

== Construction ==
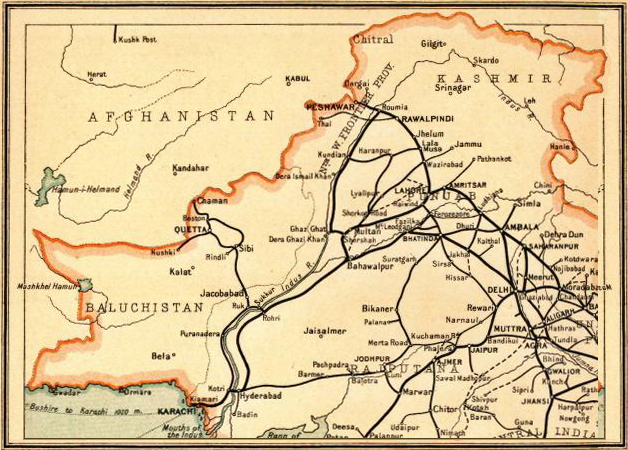
North Western Railway map 1908

The Jammu–Sialkot line was constructed as an extension of the Wazirabad–Sialkot line built in 1883–1884, at the initiative of the Maharaja's government. Maharaja Ranbir Singh (r. 1830–1885) wrote to the Governor General of India with a proposal offering to fund its construction, which was agreed. He was soon succeeded by Maharaja Pratap Singh, who continued the negotiations culminating in an agreement. The agreement stipulated that the railway would be operated by the North Western Railway, that the Maharaja would receive one per cent interest on the investment and that the earnings in excess of the one per cent would be shared equally between the Northwestern Railway and the Maharaja's government for five years, subject to a fresh agreement after the expiry of the term. The Maharaja's investment was close to Rs. 1 million (1.3 million according to other accounts). However, this clause was cancelled in the supplementary agreement, and the Punjab section of the line was funded by Government of India instead.

The construction was carried out between 1888 and 1890. It is reported that the section of the railway in Punjab was laid with 60 lbs. second-hand wrought iron rails but the Jammu and Kashmir section was laid with 75 lbs. new steel rails.

== Stations ==
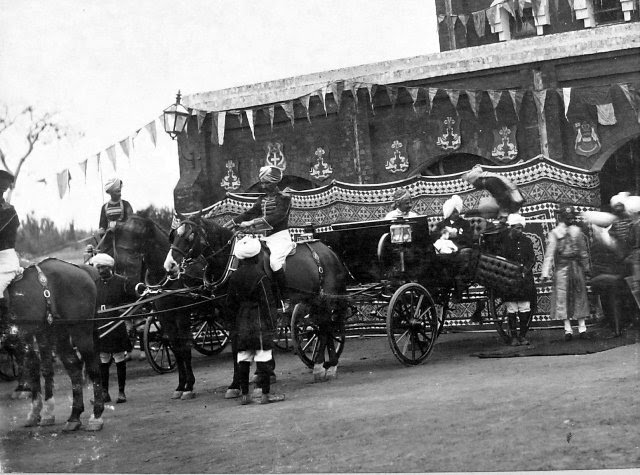
Old Jammu station (now demolished), in Bikram Chowk (32.7176876°N 74.8591673°E)

In the 1935 timetable, the section's timetable shows four pairs of passenger trains running between Sialkot and Jammu (Bikram Chowk). Two pairs ran from Wazirabad and two pairs from Sialkot. The journey time between Sialkot and Jammu (Bikram Chowk) averaged about 90 minutes. The intermediate stations listed in the timetable are (from west to east) Sialkot Cantonment, Suchetgarh, Ranbir Singh Pora, Miran Saheb and Jammu Cantonment. The Jammu and Kashmir state border crossed the line 0.26 miles (0.42 km) east of Suchetgarh station. Thus the first station on the state side was Ranbir Singh Pora.

== Demise ==
After the partition of India on 15 August 1947, the new Dominion of Pakistan inherited the North Western Railway. The government of Maharaja Hari Singh made a standstill agreement with Pakistan for continuance of all the pre-existing arrangements. However, the railway service was suspended by Pakistan on or about 18 September 1947. The act was regarded as a violation of the standstill agreement by Jammu and Kashmir. It also created hardships for the Jammu Muslims who wanted to find safety in Sialkot in the midst of increasing communal tension in Jammu. With the state's accession to India on 26 October and the ensuring Kashmir war between the two Dominions, the suspension of the railway line became permanent. The train service was never resumed.

The railway line fell into disrepair afterwards. In June–July 1948, when there was a pause in the fighting of the Kashmir War after the arrival of the UNCIP, the Indian Army Corps of Engineers used the steel rails of the railway to repair sections of roads damaged by the Pakistani forces.

The station buildings such as of Ranbir Singh Pora and others went abandoned. In 2000, the old Jammu (Bikram Chowk) railway station was demolished to make way for an art centre.

A new railway line between Pathankot in Indian Punjab and Jammu was built by the Indian Railways. The Pathankot–Madhopur section was built by 1955, the Madhopur–Kathua section by 1965 and the Kathua–Jammu section by 1972. Trains run from Jammu to Kanya Kumari at the southern end of India.

== Potential revival ==
It has been suggested that the route be reopened for trade between India and Pakistan. In July 2001, the Agra Summit was convened to resolve long-standing issues between Pakistan and India. The summit failed to produce any tangible outcome. A detailed survey in December 2013 by Pakistan Railways showed that the line is unusable and would require billions of rupees to repair and potentially run trains from Jammu to Lahore and further into Amritsar. No interest in the line has been expressed by archaeological authorities or the Northern Railway division of India.

== See also ==
- Partab Pul in Bunji
- Railway in Jammu Kashmir and Ladakh
- Geostrategic border rail lines of India

== Bibliography ==
- Ghosh, Sitansu Sekhar (2002). Railways in India – A Legend: Origin & Development (1830-1980). Jogemaya Prokashani.
- Kapur, Manohar Lal (1992), Social and economic history of Jammu and Kashmir State, 1885-1925 A.D., Anmol Publications, ISBN 978-81-7041-629-6
