= Gho Manhasan =

- Town
- Location in Jammu and Kashmir, India Gho Manhasan (India)
- Coordinates: 32.56°N 74.95°E
- Country: India
- State: Jammu and Kashmir
- District: Jammu
- Elevation: 311 m (1,020 ft)

Population (2011)
  - Total: 3,944

Languages
  - Official: Hindi, Dogri, English
- Time zone: UTC+5:30 (IST)

Gho Manhasan is a town and a Municipal committee in Jammu district in the state of Jammu and Kashmir, India.

== Geography ==
Gho Manhasan is located at 32.56°N 74.95°E. It has an average elevation of 311 metres (1,020 feet).

== Demographics ==
As of 2011 India census, Gho Manhasan had a population of 3944. Males constitute 53.5% of the population and females 46.5%. Gho Manhasan has an average literacy rate of 69%, higher than the national average of 59.5%: male literacy is 74%, and female literacy is 63%. The local language primarily spoken in Gho Manhasan and nearby areas is Dogri.

According to the 2011 census, 91.4% of the residents were Hindus, 7.9% were Sikhs and 0.6% were Christians.
