= Tasirabad Halt railway station =

Railway station in Punjab, Pakistan

Tasirabad Railway Station تاثیر آباد ریلوے اسٹیشن
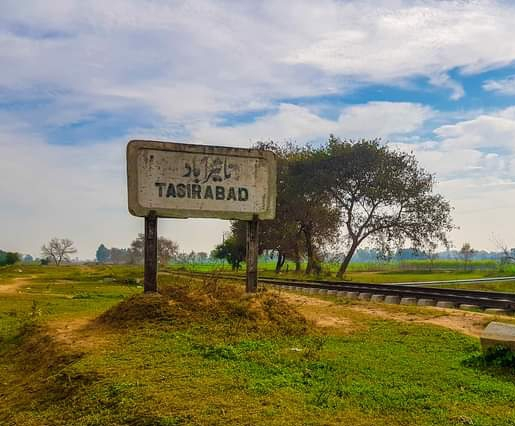

General information
- Owner: Ministry of Railways
- Line: Wazirabad–Narowal Branch Line

Other information
- Station code: TASD

Services
Preceding station	Pakistan Railways	Following station
Sialkot Junction towards Wazirabad Junction	Wazirabad–Narowal Branch Line	Gunna Kalan towards Narowal Junction
Location

Tasirabad Railway Station (Urdu: تاثیر آباد ریلوے اسٹیشن, Punjabi: تاثیر آباد ریلوے اسٹیشن) is located in Tasirabad town, Sialkot district of Punjab province, Pakistan.

== See also ==
- List of railway stations in Pakistan
- Pakistan Railways
