= Domala railway station =

Railway station in Punjab, Pakistan

Domala Railway Station دومالا ریلوے اسٹیشن

General information
- Owner: Ministry of Railways
- Line: Wazirabad–Narowal Branch Line
- Platforms: 1
- Tracks: 2

Other information
- Station code: DMLA

Services
Preceding station	Pakistan Railways	Following station
Alipur Sayadan Sharif towards Wazirabad Junction	Wazirabad–Narowal Branch Line	Narowal Junction Terminus
Location

Domala Railway Station (Urdu: دومالا ریلوے اسٹیشن, Punjabi: دومالا ریلوے اسٹیشن) is located in Domala village, Narowal district of Punjab province, Pakistan.

== See also ==
- List of railway stations in Pakistan
- Pakistan Railways
