= Gunna Kalan railway station =

Railway station in Punjab, Pakistan

Gunna Kalan Railway Station گنہ کلاں ریلوے اسٹیشن
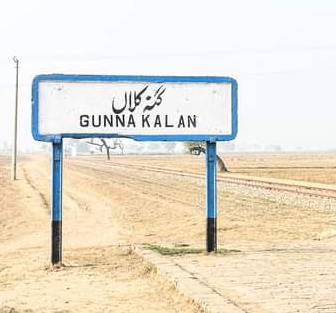

General information
- Coordinates: 32.4160°N 74.6136°E
- Owner: Ministry of Railways
- Line: Wazirabad–Narowal Branch Line

Other information
- Station code: GKO

Services
Preceding station	Pakistan Railways	Following station
Tasirabad Halt towards Wazirabad Junction	Wazirabad–Narowal Branch Line	Alhar towards Narowal Junction
Location

Gunna Kalan Railway Station (Urdu: گنہ کلاں ریلوے اسٹیشن, Punjabi: گنہ کلاں ریلوے اسٹیشن) is located in Gunna Kalan village, Sialkot district of Punjab province, Pakistan.

== See also ==
- List of railway stations in Pakistan
- Pakistan Railways
