= Ranbir Penal Code =

Criminal code of the erstwhile state of Jammu and Kashmir

Dogra dynasty
- Territorial extent: Jammu and Kashmir
- Enacted: 1932
- Assented to: 1932
- Commenced: 1932
- Repealed: 5 August 2019

Repealed by
- Indian Penal Code
- Status: Repealed

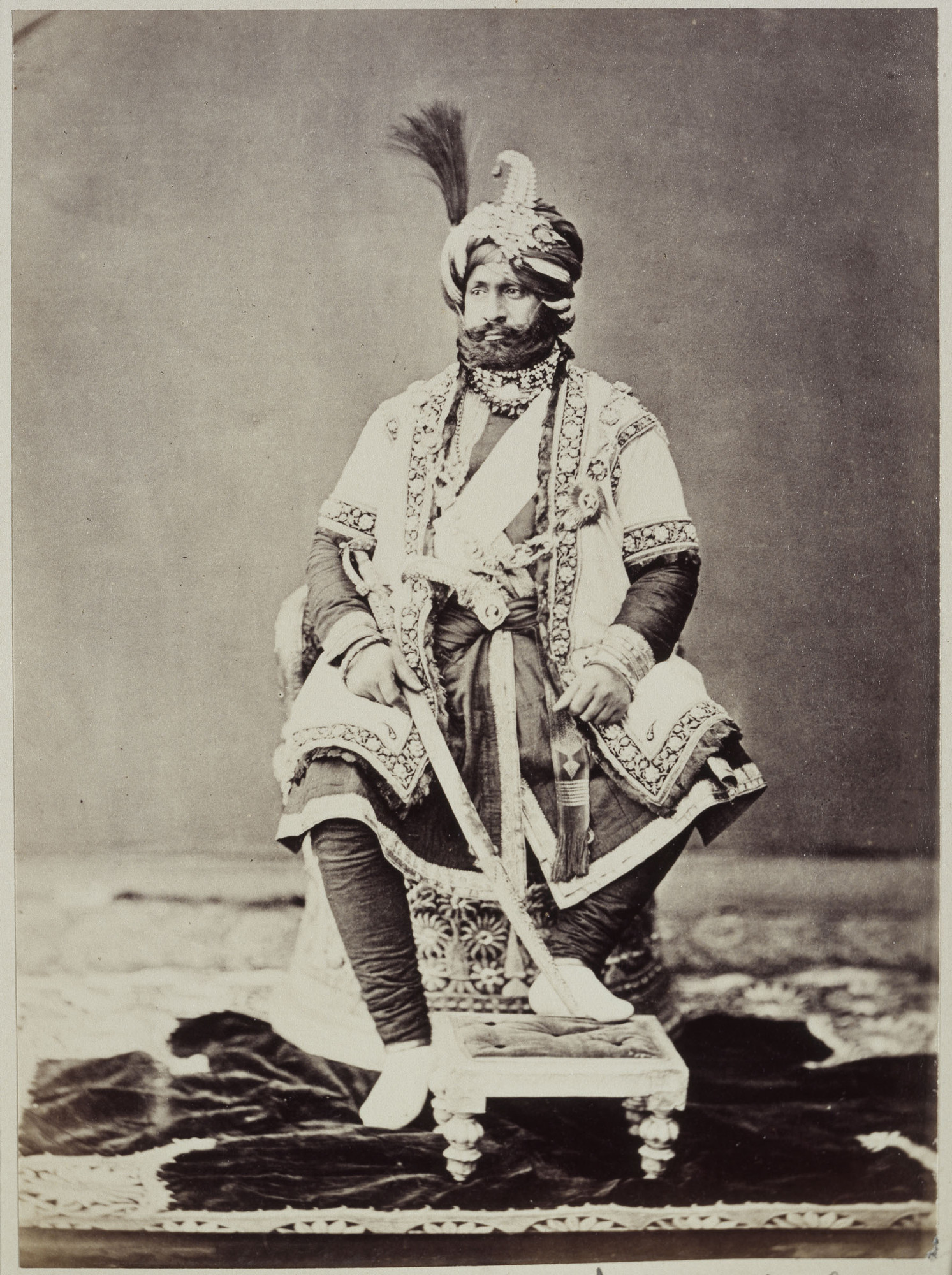
Ranbir Singh of Jammu and Kashmir - Maharaja of Jammu and Kashmir from 1856 to 1885

Jammu and Kashmir State Ranbir Penal Code or RPC was the main criminal code applicable in the erstwhile Indian state of Jammu and Kashmir. The Indian Penal Code, applicable elsewhere in India, was not applicable here under Article 370 of the Constitution of India.

It came into force in 1932. The code was introduced during the reign of Maharaja Ranbir Singh and hence named after him. It was made on the lines of Indian Penal Code prepared by Thomas Babington Macaulay. The Parliament of India passed the bill to scrap provisions of Article 370 of the Indian Constitution on 5 August 2019. The Constitution of India which was applicable to the rest of India except Jammu and Kashmir, has now become applicable all over India. The state of Jammu and Kashmir (J&K) has got divided into the Union Territories of J&K and Ladakh after the successful passage of the Jammu and Kashmir Reorganization Bill in the Rajya Sabha and Lok Sabha respectively. The Ranbir Penal Code was repealed and the Indian Penal Code came into force in the region. The Indian Penal Code itself was repealed and replaced by Bharatiya Nyaya Sanhita in the year 2024.
