= Ugoke railway station =

Railway station in Punjab, Pakistan

Ugoke Railway Station اگوکی ریلوے اسٹیشن

General information
- Coordinates: 32.4783°N 74.4447°E
- Owner: Ministry of Railways
- Line: Wazirabad–Narowal Branch Line

Other information
- Station code: UGE

Services
Preceding station	Pakistan Railways	Following station
Sahowala towards Wazirabad Junction	Wazirabad–Narowal Branch Line	Sialkot Junction towards Narowal Junction
Location

Ugoke Railway Station (Urdu: اگوکی ریلوے اسٹیشن, Punjabi: اگوکی ریلوے اسٹیشن) is located in Ugoke town, Sialkot district of Punjab province, Pakistan.

== See also ==
- List of railway stations in Pakistan
- Pakistan Railways
