= Pasrur railway station =

Railway station in Punjab, Pakistan

Pasrur Railway Station پسرور ریلوے اسٹیشن

General information
- Coordinates: 32.2734°N 74.6684°E
- Owner: Ministry of Railways
- Line: Wazirabad–Narowal Branch Line
- Platforms: 1
- Tracks: 2

Other information
- Station code: PSW

Services
Preceding station	Pakistan Railways	Following station
Chawinda towards Wazirabad Junction	Wazirabad–Narowal Branch Line	Qila Sobha Singh towards Narowal Junction
Location

Pasrur Railway Station (Urdu: پسرور ریلوے اسٹیشن, Punjabi: پسرور ریلوے اسٹیشن) is located in Pasrur city, Sialkot district of Punjab province, Pakistan. There are two functional and three nonfuntional railway tracks at this railway station.

Allama Iqbal Express and Lasani Express have regular scheduled stops at the station. Lasani Express starts from Sialkot and ends in Lahore via Narowal.

Allama Iqbal Express also starts from Sialkot and travels all the way to Karachi via Narowal and Lahore. The Sialkot-to-Karachi journey is the longest route of this track.

== Railway Station Pasrur timings ==
Pasrur railway station remains open during the scheduled hours for the two trains' arrival and departure. Both trains come from Sialkot in the morning and depart Pasrur after a two-minute stay. Lasani Express come back at 7:30PM, nearing the end of its round trip. Allama Iqbal Express depart at 8:30AM and returns at 4.44PM.

== See also ==
- List of railway stations in Pakistan
- Pakistan Railways
