= Alhar railway station =

Railway station in Punjab, Pakistan

Alhar Railway Station الہڑ ریلوے اسٹیشن
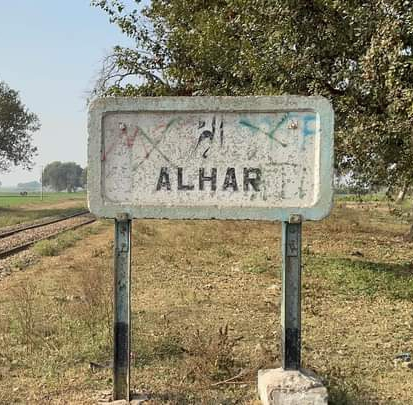

General information
- Coordinates: 32.3742°N 74.6705°E
- Owner: Ministry of Railways
- Line: Wazirabad–Narowal Branch Line

Other information
- Station code: ALX

Services
Preceding station	Pakistan Railways	Following station
Gunna Kalan towards Wazirabad Junction	Wazirabad–Narowal Branch Line	Chawinda towards Narowal Junction
Location

Alhar Railway Station (Urdu: الہڑ ریلوے اسٹیشن, Punjabi: الہڑ ریلوے اسٹیشن) is located in Alhar village, Sialkot district of Punjab province, Pakistan.

== See also ==
- List of railway stations in Pakistan
- Pakistan Railways
