= Sahowala railway station =

Railway station in Pakistan

Coordinates: 32.477341°N 74.408192°E

Sahowala Station Mughal Colony سہووالا ریلوے اسٹیشن

General information
- Owner: Ministry of Railways
- Line: Wazirabad–Narowal Branch Line

Other information
- Station code: SLA

Services
Preceding station	Pakistan Railways	Following station
Sambrial towards Wazirabad Junction	Wazirabad–Narowal Branch Line	Ugoke towards Narowal Junction
Location

Sahowala Railway Station (Urdu: سہووالا ریلوے اسٹیشن) is located in Pakistan.

== See also ==
- List of railway stations in Pakistan
- Pakistan Railways
