= Qila Sobha Singh railway station =

Railway station in Punjab, Pakistan

Qila Sobha Singh Station قلعہ سوبھا سنگھ ریلوے اسٹیشن

General information
- Coordinates: 32.2301°N 74.7633°E
- Owner: Ministry of Railways
- Line: Wazirabad–Narowal Branch Line

Other information
- Station code: QSB

History
- Opened: 1916

Services
Preceding station	Pakistan Railways	Following station
Pasrur towards Wazirabad Junction	Wazirabad–Narowal Branch Line	Alipur Sayadan Sharif towards Narowal Junction
Location

Qila Sobha Singh Railway Station (Urdu: قلعہ سوبھا سنگھ ریلوے اسٹیشن, Punjabi: قلعہ سوبھا سنگھ ریلوے اسٹیشن) is located in Qila Sobha Singh town, Narowal district of Punjab province, Pakistan.

== See also ==
- List of railway stations in Pakistan
- Pakistan Railways
