= Sodhra Kopra railway station =

Railway station in Punjab, Pakistan

Coordinates: 32.44437°N 74.20931°E

Sodhra Kopra Railway Station سودھرہ کوپرہ ریلوے اسٹیشن

General information
- Owner: Ministry of Railways
- Line: Wazirabad–Narowal Branch Line

Other information
- Station code: SDA

Services
Preceding station	Pakistan Railways	Following station
Wazirabad Junction Terminus	Wazirabad–Narowal Branch Line	Begowala Ghartal towards Narowal Junction
Location

Sodhra Kopra Railway Station (Urdu: سودھرہ کوپرہ ریلوے اسٹیشن, Punjabi: سودھرا کوپرا ریلوے اسٹیشن) is located in Sodhra town, Gujranwala district of Punjab province, Pakistan.

== See also ==
- List of railway stations in Pakistan
- Pakistan Railways
