= Sialkot Cantonment railway station =

Railway station in Pakistan

Sialkot Cantonment Station سیالکوٹ کینٹ ریلوے اسٹیشن

General information
- Coordinates: 32.5112°N 74.5863°E
- Owner: Ministry of Railways
- Line: Sialkot–Jammu Branch Line (Defunct)

Other information
- Station code: SLKC

Services
Preceding station	Pakistan Railways	Following station
Terminus	Jammu–Sialkot line (defunct)	Sialkot Junction Terminus
Location

Sialkot Cantonment railway station (Urdu: سیالکوٹ کینٹ ریلوے اسٹیشن) is an abandoned railway station located in Sialkot, Pakistan.

== See also ==
- List of railway stations in Pakistan
- Pakistan Railways
