= Sambrial railway station =

Railway station in Punjab, Pakistan

Sambrial Railway Station سمبڑیال ریلوے اسٹیشن

General information
- Coordinates: 32.4775°N 74.3596°E
- Owner: Ministry of Railways
- Line: Wazirabad–Narowal Branch Line

Other information
- Station code: SMB

Services
Preceding station	Pakistan Railways	Following station
Begowala Ghartal towards Wazirabad Junction	Wazirabad–Narowal Branch Line	Sahowala towards Narowal Junction
Location

Sambrial Railway Station (Urdu: سمبڑیال ریلوے اسٹیشن, Punjabi: سمبڑیال ریلوے اسٹیشن) is located in Sambrial town, Sialkot district of Punjab province, Pakistan.

== See also ==
- List of railway stations in Pakistan
- Pakistan Railways
