= Alipur Sayadan Sharif railway station =

Railway station in Punjab, Pakistan

Alipur Sayadan Sharif Station علی پورسیداں شریف ریلوے اسٹیشن
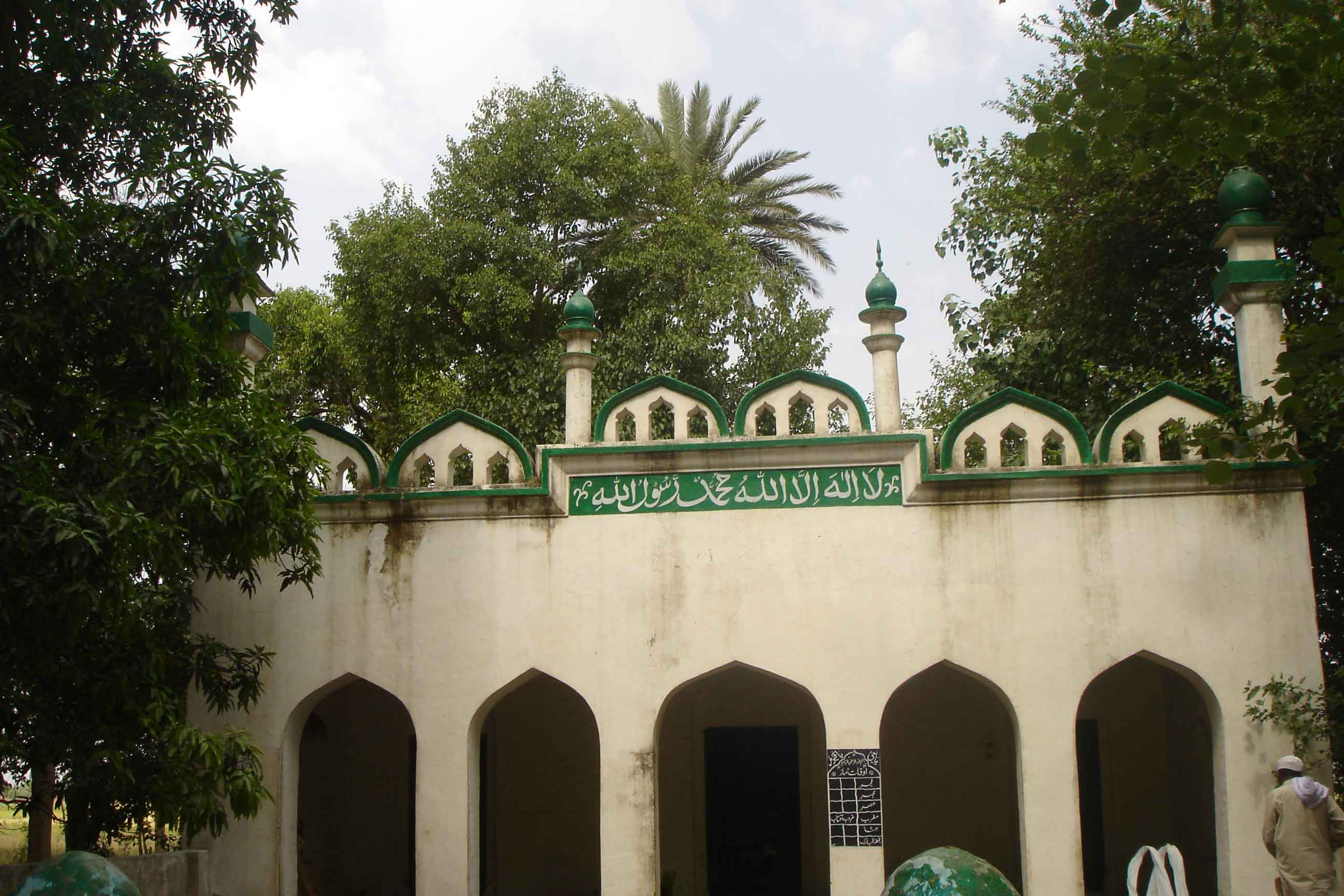
- Mosque at the station

General information
- Coordinates: 32.19698°N 74.7897°E
- Owner: Ministry of Railways
- Line: Wazirabad–Narowal Branch Line

Other information
- Station code: ASY

Services
Preceding station	Pakistan Railways	Following station
Qila Sobha Singh towards Wazirabad Junction	Wazirabad–Narowal Branch Line	Domala towards Narowal Junction
Location
- Location within Punjab, Pakistan Location within Pakistan

Alipur Sayadan Sharif Railway Station (Urdu: علی پورسیداں شریف ریلوے اسٹیشن, Punjabi: علی پورسیداں شریف ریلوے اسٹیشن) is located in Alipur Syedan town, Narowal district, Punjab province, Pakistan.

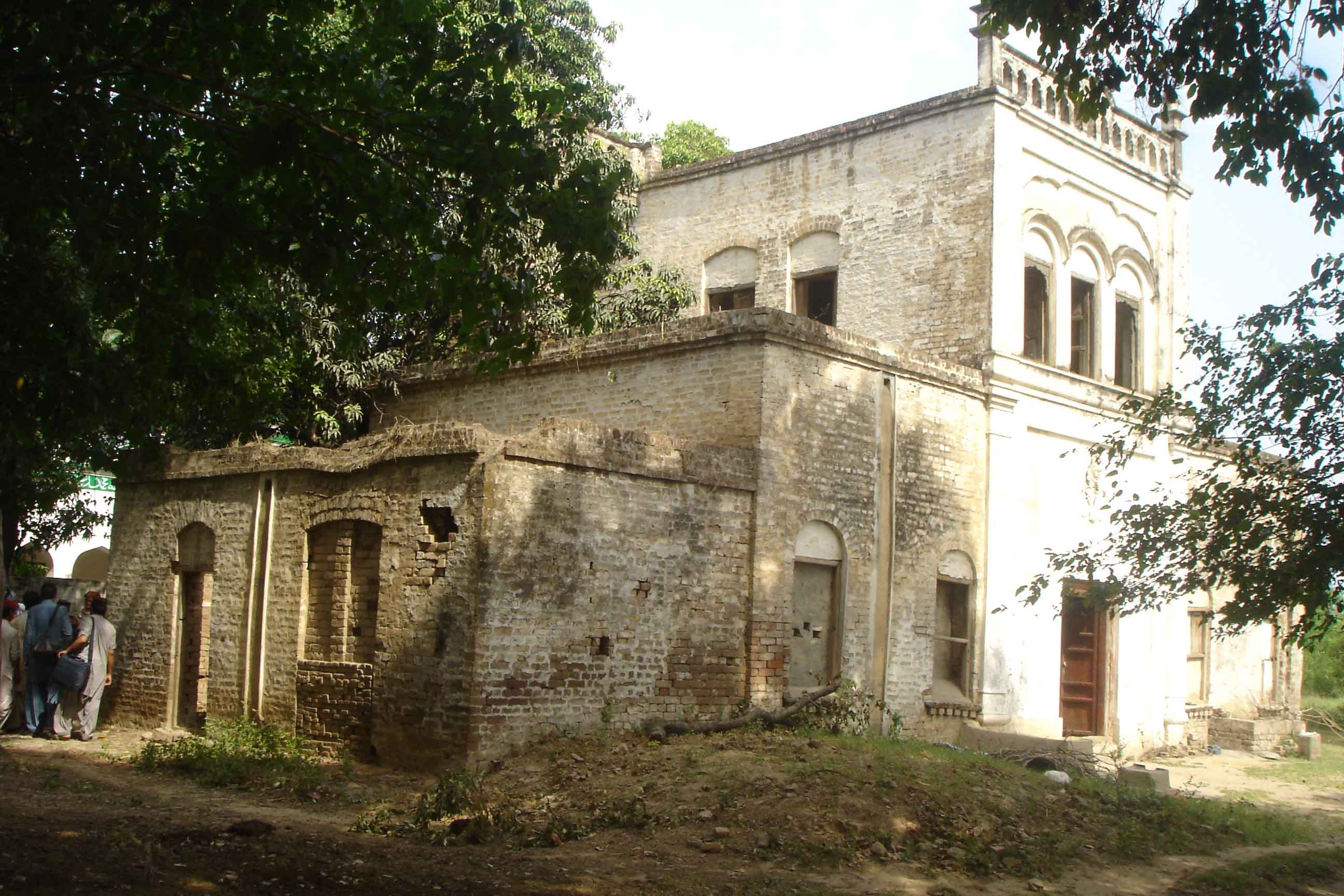
Pre-Partition era guesthouse at the station.

== See also ==
- List of railway stations in Pakistan
- Pakistan Railways
