= Chawinda railway station =

Railway station in Punjab, Pakistan

Chawinda Railway Station چونڈہ ریلوے اسٹیشن
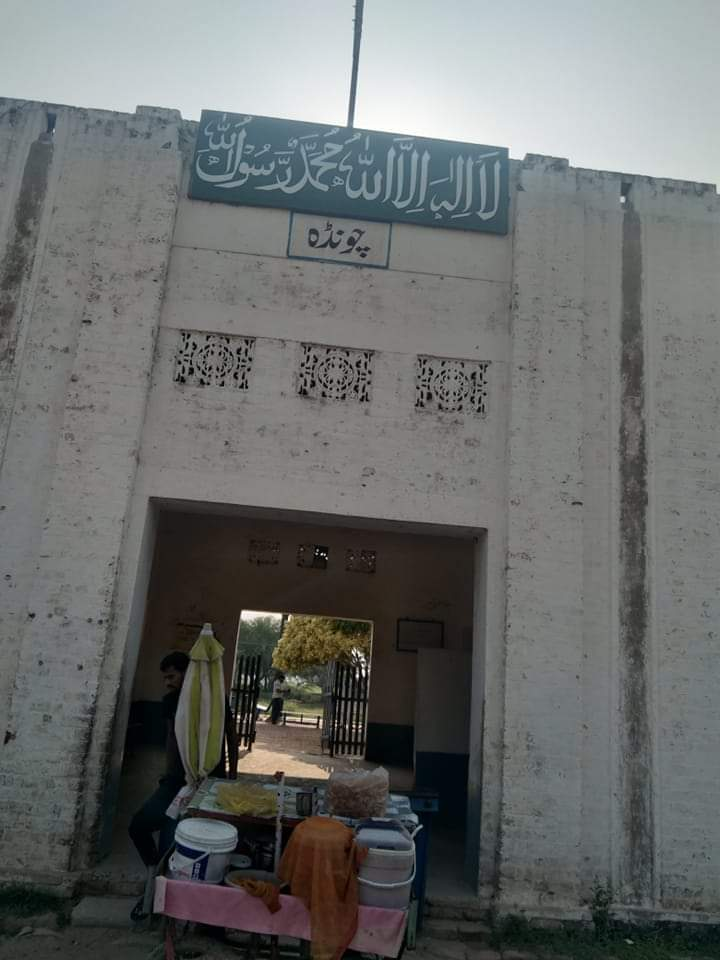

General information
- Coordinates: 32.3435°N 74.6988°E
- Owner: Ministry of Railways
- Line: Wazirabad–Narowal Branch Line
- Platforms: 1
- Tracks: 2

Other information
- Station code: CWD

Services
Preceding station	Pakistan Railways	Following station
Alhar towards Wazirabad Junction	Wazirabad–Narowal Branch Line	Pasrur towards Narowal Junction
Location

Chawinda Railway Station (Urdu: چونڈہ ریلوے اسٹیشن, Punjabi: چونڈہ ریلوے اسٹیشن) is located in Chawinda town, Sialkot district of Punjab province, Pakistan.

== See also ==
- List of railway stations in Pakistan
- Pakistan Railways
