= Ranbir Singh (jurist) =

Professor Ranbir Singh is the founding Vice-Chancellor of National Law University, Delhi established by the Government of Delhi in 2008.He is working as legal advisor of Prime Minister. He was the founding Vice-Chancellor of Nalsar University of Law, Hyderabad established by Andhra Pradesh state government. He had been there for 10 years and India today magazine rated the University as one of the best universities in India. It was started with 20 students only. On his name legal research centre has been established.

== Personal life ==
He was born in Atta village of Panipat, Haryana.

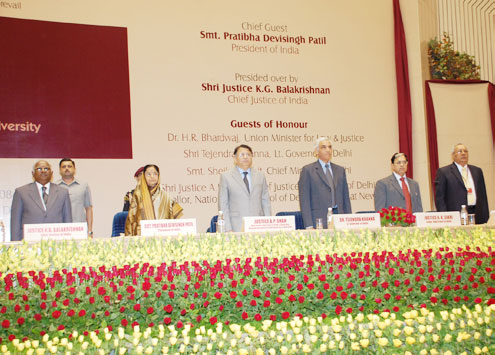
President Of India at NLUD inauguration ceremony with Prof. Ranbir Singh
