= Ranbirpura =

Ranbir Pura (Kaurji Wala) is a small village in Patiala District in Punjab, India. It is near the Bhakhra Canal on the roads to Sangrur and Nabha. The village is also known as Ranbir Pura. It is about 10 km from the city of Patiala. The village has one gurdwara.

== Gallery ==
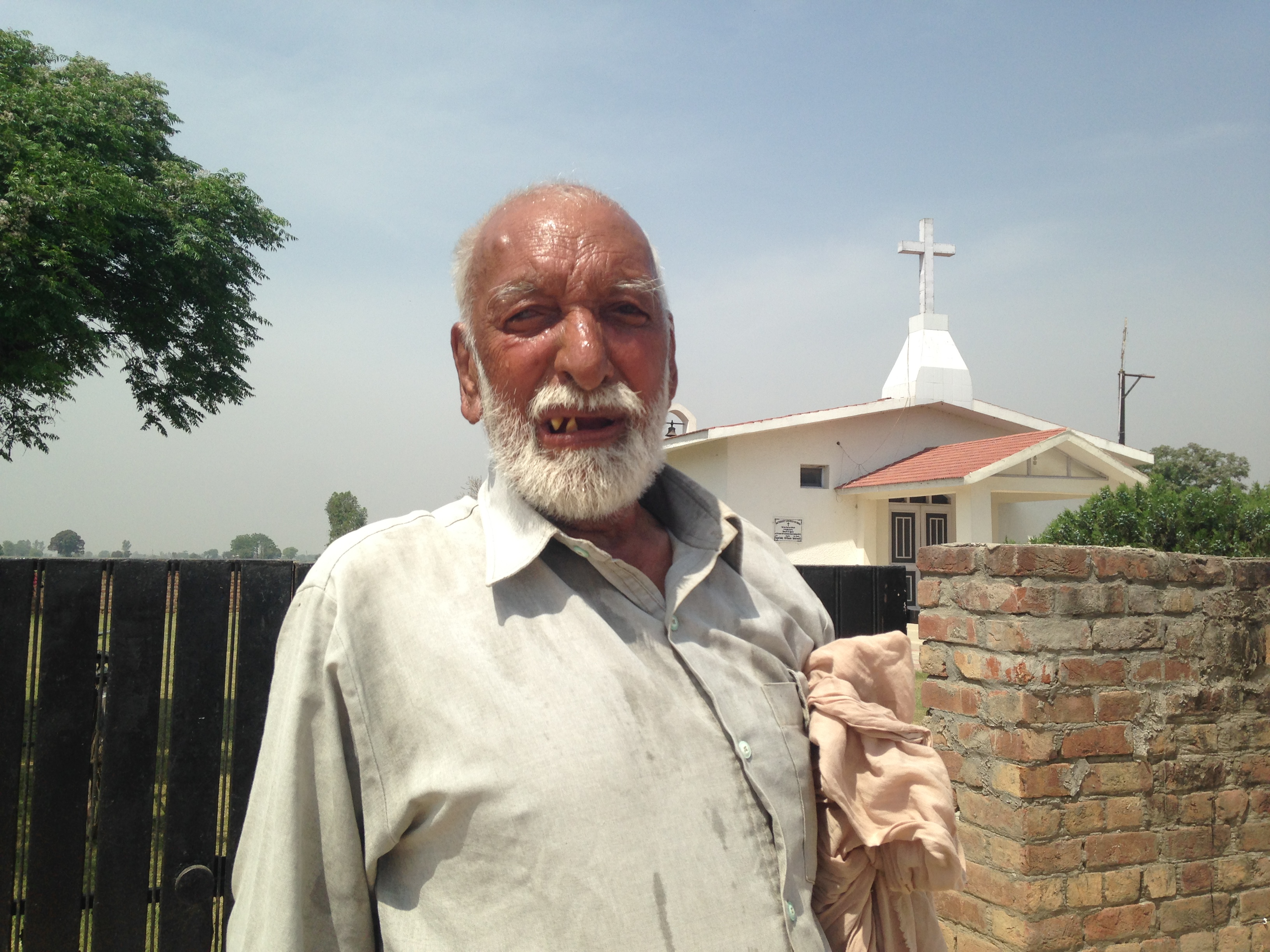
An Indian Christian in front of Methodist Church at Ranbirpura

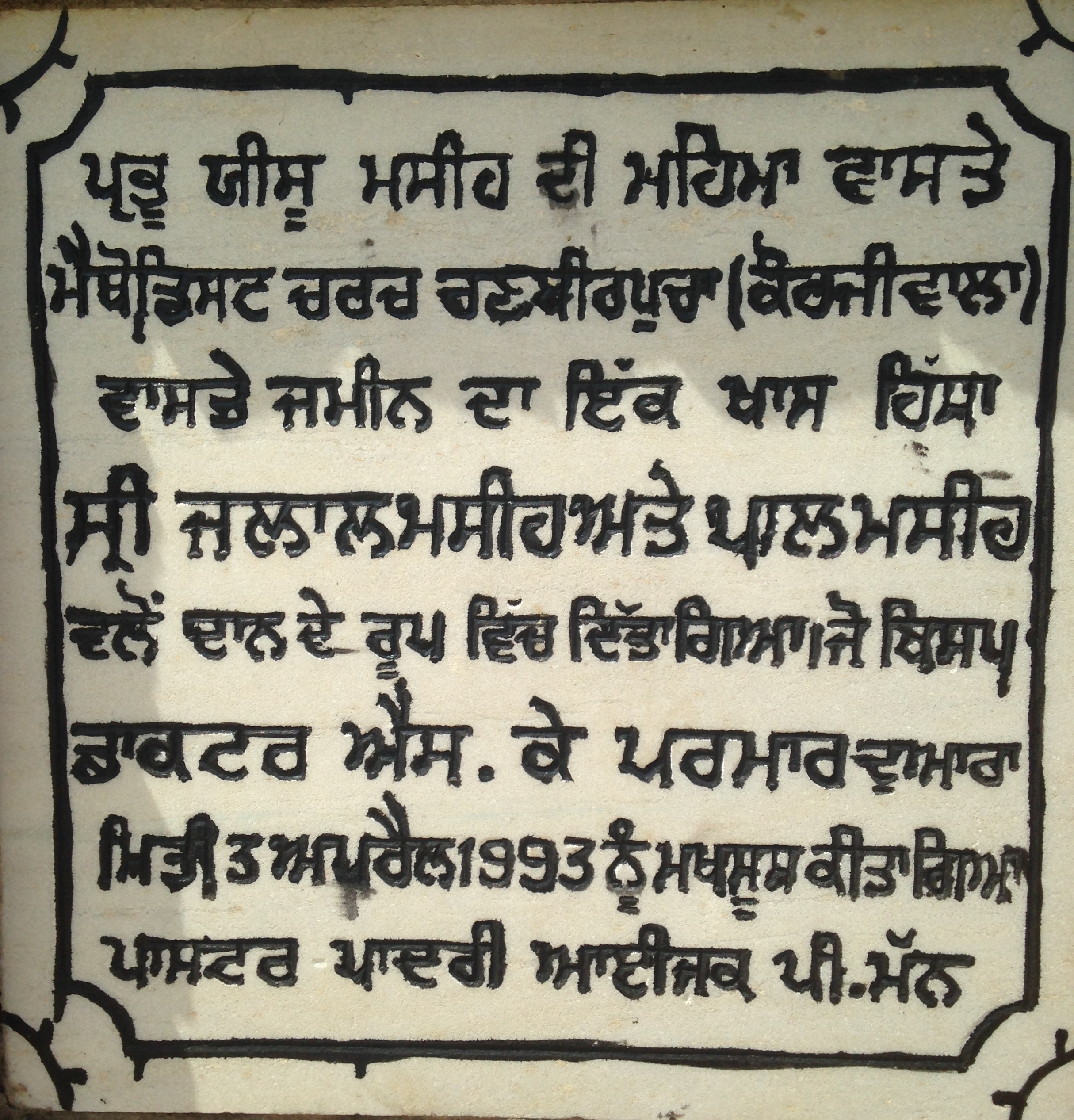
Foundation stone of Methodist Church at Ranbirpura

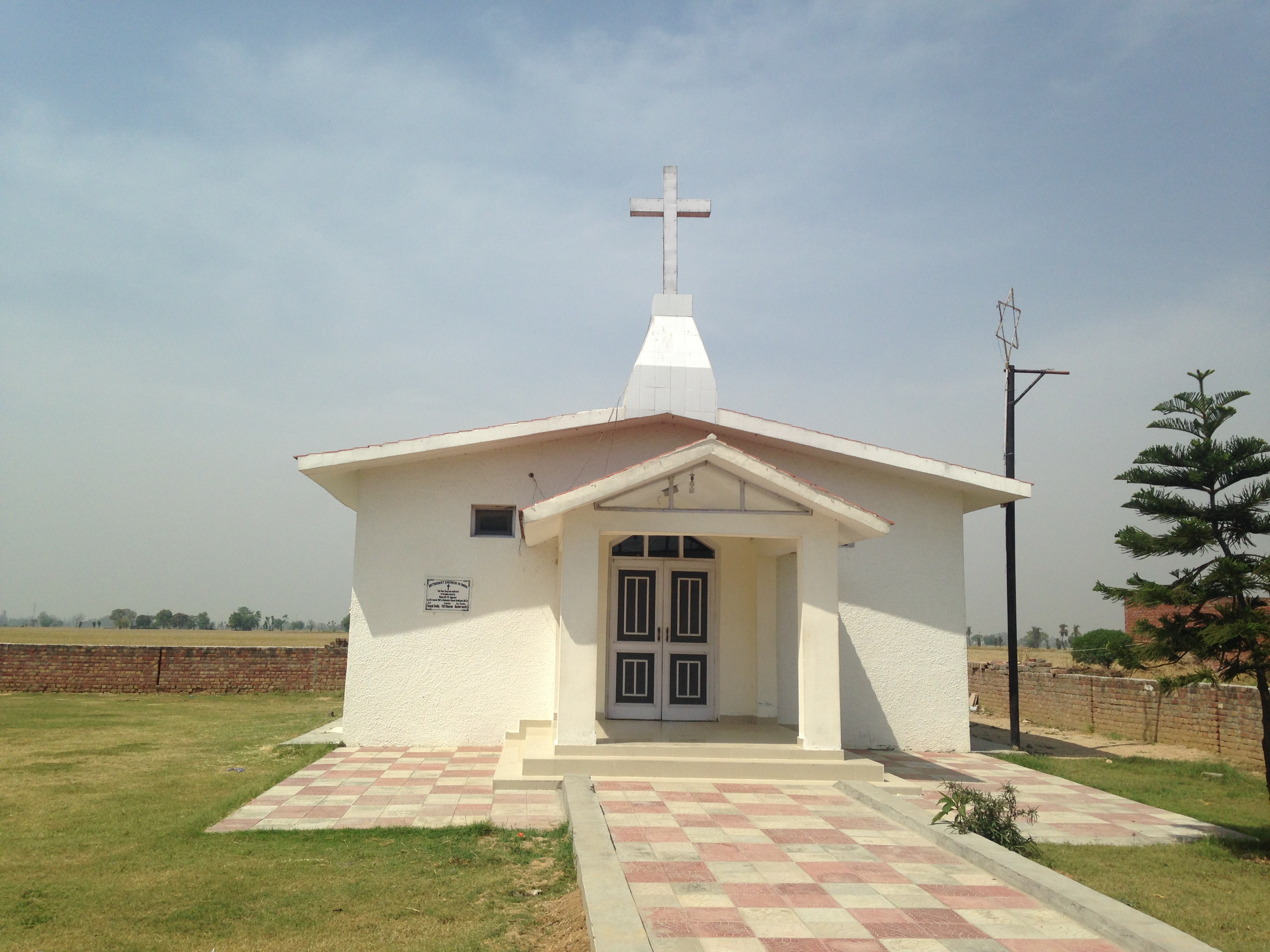
Methodist Church at Ranbirpura

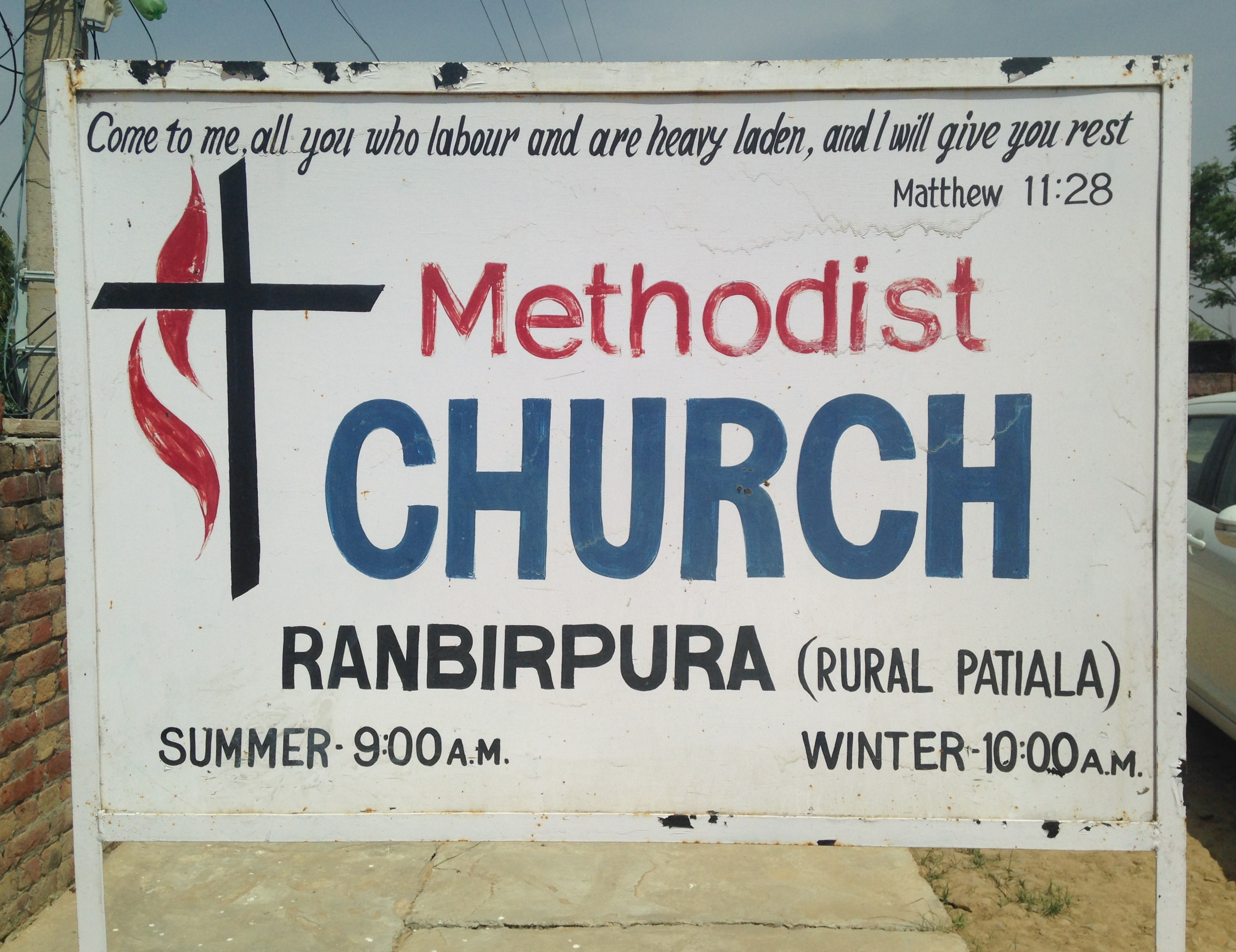
Signboard of Methodist Church at Ranbirpura in English

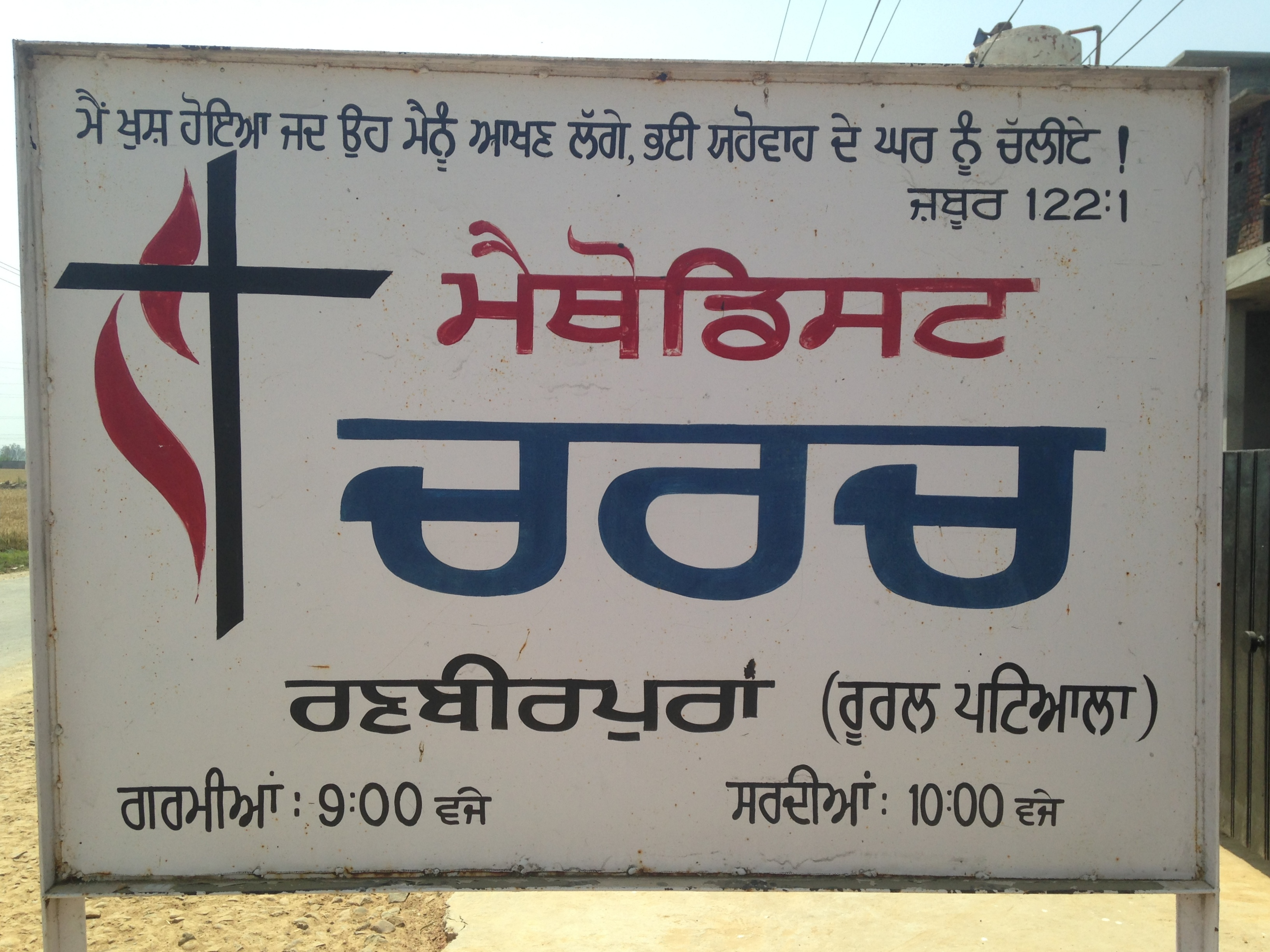
Signboard of Methodist Church at Ranbirpura in Punjabi
