= Begowala =

Begowala بیگووالہ
- Location within Pakistan
- Coordinates: 32°26′N 74°16′E
- Country: Pakistan
- Province: Punjab

Government
  - Chairman: Empty seat

Population (1998)
  - Total: ca. 8,322
  - Estimate (2018): ca. 9,300
- Time zone: UTC+5 (PST)
- Calling code: 052
- Website: www.begowala.com

Begowala (Urdu: بیگووالہ) is a town of Sialkot District in the Punjab province of Pakistan. It is located in the mid-point along the Sialkot-Wazirabad road and lies 10 km from Sambrial. Begowala is cold during winters, going down to 0°C, and hot and humid during summers, especially during May and June. The land is generally plain and fertile. Most of the rain falls during the Monsoon season in summer, which often results in flooding.

== Images ==
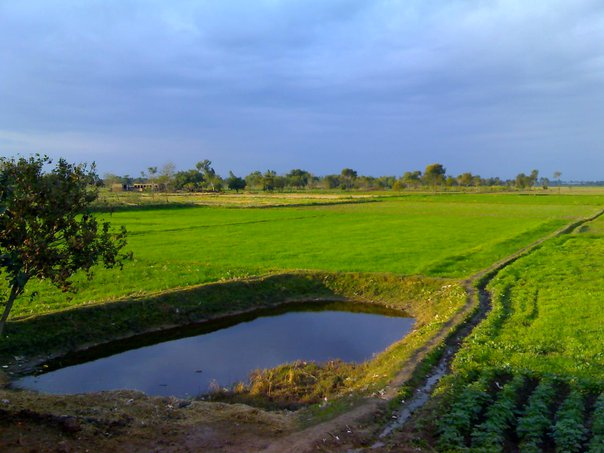
Field

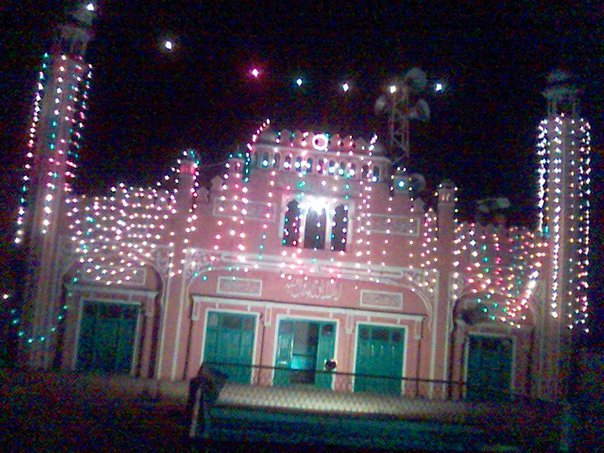
Jamia Mosque

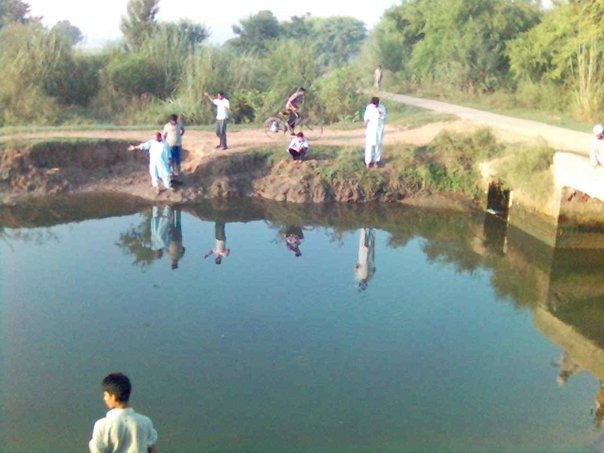
Ayek Naala
