= Ranbir Singh Pora =

Ranbir Singh Pura Nawa Sehar
- City
- Ranbir Singh Pura
- Nickname: Nawa Shehar
- Location in Jammu and Kashmir, India Ranbir Singh Pura (India)
- Coordinates: 32.63°N 74.73°E
- Country: India
- Union territory: Jammu and Kashmir
- District: Jammu
- Founder: Maharaja Ranbir Singh

Government
  - Type: Central government
- Elevation: 270 m (890 ft)

Population (2011)
  - Total: 163,567

language
  - Official: Hindi
  - Secondary: Dogri
- Time zone: UTC+5:30 (IST)
- Postal code: 181102
- Vehicle registration: JK02

Ranbir Singh Pura (R. S. Pura) is a city and Tehsil, near city of Jammu in Jammu district of the Indian Union territory of Jammu and Kashmir. It was the first planned city of Jammu and Kashmir

== History ==
R. S. Pura was known as Nawashehar during the rule of the Dogra Rajput Rajas of the Dev Dynasty of Jammu from Raja Jambulochan to the 18th century. When Maharaja Gulab Singh of the Dogra dynasty, became the first ruler of Jammu and Kashmir. After his death, his son Ranbir Singh became the Maharaja of Jammu and Kashmir. Under his Rule he changed the name to R. S. Pura. Before independence, this area was regularly visited by the Jaddi people of Dalowali who used to carry sugarcane to Nawanshehar (R. S. Pura) Sugar Mills. Before 1947 there was a large sugar mill in RS Pura. It was the first planned town in the state. Prior to 1947 the only rail station in Jammu and Kashmir was at R. S. Pura. There was an old station in the city, which had train services to Sialkot junction, now in Pakistan. The station was also linked with Wazirabad and Narowal (both in Pakistan). The station was built around 1867.

== Geography ==
Named after Dogra Maharaja Ranbir Singh, Ranbir Singh Pura is located at 32.63°N 74.73°E. It has an average elevation of 270 metres (886 feet above sea level). The daily mean temperature in the region is ~6 °C in winter and ~44 °C in summer.

It is 24.5 km south of district headquarter Jammu and about 320 km from state capital Srinagar. It is mainly connected though road with main cities. R.S. Pura is approx. 22 km away from Jammu Tawi railway station and nearly 15 km away from the airport. It is located on the Indo-Pak border Suchetgarh which is 33 km away from the district headquarters of Jammu.

It is a major Tehsil having 194 villages as per 2011 census. The main languages spoken by the people of this area are Punjabi, Dogri, Hindi and Urdu. The main road linking R.S. Pura was once the bus route from Jammu to Sialkot (Pakistan) and this route was so popular that there were several inns built on the route by the Maharaja of Jammu and Kashmir.

Suchetgarh (Indo-Pak border) is nearly 35 km from Jammu City and 10.3 km from R.S Pura. This post was set up after first war over Kashmir in 1947–48. Prior to independence there used to be an Octroi post for collection of taxes at Suchetgarh. Now it is used as a Border Security Post. Near the vicinity of this post there lie a Prehistoric and Raghunath temple which have their own importance. Within the temple complex there is an old Sarai which was used as a halting place for travelers.

== Economy ==
The main economic activities of Ranbir Singh Pura are agriculture and dairy farming. Rice (basmati) and wheat are major crops, and berseen and vegetables are also grown. The Rakh area of Badyal Brahmana and Arnia are known for vegetable farming. Ranbir Singh Pura has many rice mills for the processing of high-quality Basmati rice. The Chenab River is used to irrigate the agricultural lands in almost every part of R.S Pura through the Ranbir Canal System.

== Education ==
The major educational institutions of Ranbir Singh Pura are SKUAST-Veterinary College, Govt. Degree College, and Govt. Higher Sec School. The city also possesses many centers of primary and secondary education.

== Demographics ==
At the time of the 2011 India census, Ranbir Singh Pura had a population of 163567. Males constitute 54% of the population and females 46%. Ranbir Singh Pura has an average literacy rate of 70%, higher than the national average of 59.5%: male literacy is 77%, and female literacy is 63%. In Ranbir Singh Pura, 11% of the population is under 6 years of age.

| Rank | Language | 1971 |
|---|---|---|
| 1 | Dogri | 79.11% |
| 2 | Punjabi | 16.78% |
| 3 | Lahnda | 2.07% |
| — | Other | 2.04% |

== Religion ==
The religious data for the RS Pura, Notified Committee Municipal Limits is Hindu 90.52%, Sikh 5.97%, Muslim 1.70%, Christians 1.69%

== Transport ==
The town once had a train station on the Jammu-Sialkot Line. Currently, bus services are available for reaching to Jammu City.
