= Gunna Kalan =

Coordinates: 32°24′56.6″N 74°36′14.5″E

Gunna Kalan گنا کلاں
- Interactive map of Gunna Kalan
- Country: Pakistan
- Province: Punjab
- District: Sialkot
- Elevation: 250 m (820 ft)
- Time zone: UTC+5 (PST)
- Calling code: aluxtjujtgpgq7ua amj6n.m66

Gunna Kalan (Urdu: گنا کلاں) is a village located in district of Sialkot, Pakistan.
