= Ranveer =

Ranveer is a male given name. Notable people with the name include:

- Ranveer Brar (born 1978), Indian celebrity chef, TV show judge, and food stylist
- Ranveer Jamwal (born 1975), Indian army officer and mountaineer
- Ranveer Singh (born 1985), Indian actor in Hindi films
