= Mridu Rai =

Indian historian

- Title: Professor

Academic background
- Education: University of Delhi; Jawaharlal Nehru University; Columbia University
- Thesis: The Question of Religion in Kashmir: Sovereignty, Legitimacy and Rights, 1846–1947 (2000)
- Doctoral advisor: Ayesha Jalal

Academic work
- Discipline: Historian
- Sub-discipline: Modern History of South Asia
- Institutions: Presidency University, Kolkata; Trinity College, Dublin; Yale University; Bowdoin College
- Notable works: Hindu Rulers, Muslim Subjects

Mridu Rai is an Indian historian who serves as a professor at Presidency University, Kolkata. Rai is the author of the prizewinning book Hindu Rulers, Muslim Subjects: Islam, Rights, and the History of Kashmir (2004).

== Education ==
Mridu Rai graduated with an honours in history from the University of Delhi in 1986. She completed her master's degree, with a major in medieval Indian history, from Jawaharlal Nehru University (JNU) in 1988. She finished her M.Phil. in 1991, with medieval Indian history as her major. She completed her M.Phil. in modern South Asian history at Columbia University in 1994. Then she completed her PhD in modern South Asian history from the same university in 2000. Her Ph.D. dissertation was called: 'The Question of Religion in Kashmir: Sovereignty, Legitimacy and Rights, 1846–1947'. The dissertation analysed the mixture of religion and politics in Kashmir and examined the Hindu state in princely Jammu and Kashmir.

== Career ==
In 1997–1998, Rai taught as a visiting lecturer at Tufts University. In 1999, she taught as an adjunct instructor at Columbia University. Between 1999 and 2007, she served as assistant professor first at Bowdoin College and later at Yale University. From 2007 to 2010, she served as an associate professor at Yale University. In 2010–2011, Rai was a research fellow at the Davis Centre for Historical Studies at Princeton University. From 2011 to 2014, she taught at Trinity College, Dublin, where she was a member of the Department of History. Since 2014, she is serving as a professor at Presidency University, Kolkata.

She has held senior research fellowships at Whitney and Betty MacMillan Center, Yale University (2007–2010) and the American Institute of Indian Studies (2007–2008). She was an Honorary Fellow of Netaji Institute for Asian Studies in Kolkata from 2017 to 2018. She also held the Whitney Griswold Fellowship at Yale University. Rai has also obtained the Morse Fellowship at Yale University (2004–2005), the Freeman Foundation Fellowship for Faculty Research at Bowdoin College (2000) and the University Traveling Fellowship in Columbia University (1994–1995). In 2016, Rai also was on a Cambridge-Hamied Visiting Lecturership at the Centre of South Asian Studies in the University of Cambridge.

Rai teaches all aspects of Indian history., including imperial and colonial history. She also supervises master's degree dissertations. She is currently working on a history of Kashmir and on the geography of justice pertaining to caste violence in North India.

== Publications ==
=== Book ===
- Rai, Mridu (2004). Hindu Rulers, Muslim Subjects: Islam, Rights, and the History of Kashmir. Princeton: Princeton University Press. ISBN 9780691116884.

Her book Hindu Rulers, Muslim Subjects won a prize for the "first best book on an international subject" from Yale University.

==== Hindu Rulers, Muslim Subjects: Islam, Rights, and the History of Kashmir ====
In 2004, Rai published Hindu Rulers, Muslim Subjects: Islam, Rights, and the History of Kashmir.

W.W. Reinhardt of Randolph-Macon College notes that Rai's scholarly work examines Kashmiri history since the state of Jammu and Kashmir was "bizzarely [sic?] created" in 1846, how Gulab Singh cemented his "dubious position" with reference to Hindu symbolism and how the Kashmiri Muslim population fell into a condition of "abject helplessness" by the 1930s. Weinhardt concludes by giving the book his highest recommendation for all levels.

Sumit Ganguly in a review in the Journal of Asian Studies, notes "Rai's contribution lies in the extremely thorough and painstaking documentation". He adds that, "her account of the growth of Muslim religio-political consciousness in the early part of the twentieth century ... unearths a wealth of detail. He further adds that, "Rai's book is a useful one. Those interested in understanding the background of the continuing tragedy in Kashmir will find much to consider in her substantial account of the historical backdrop". Tapan Raychaudhri calls Rai's account of the way the sovereignty of the Dogras, with no basis in Kashmir, interacted with the British rule, "illuminating."

Alexander Evans of the King's College London calls the book "a major contribution to Kashmir studies". He adds that it sets "the standard for the next generation of publications on Kashmir. Challenging the existing literature, this work is heady and fresh—and deserves attention."

Peter van der Veer of the University of Amsterdam notes that the book reminds readers of the "crucial importance of colonial history to the present". He adds that Rai is "able to de-essentialize religion and secularism in the Kashmir conflict, which is very useful in light of India's secularist claims and the ways in which some sociologists have theorized those claims". He further adds: "Carefully researched and lucidly conceptualized and written, this book forwards an important thesis on an important topic".

Sugata Bose of Harvard University calls it "a brilliant work of historical scholarship that will become indispensable reading". He further added that it is "a pioneering historical study of rights, religion, and regional identity in Kashmir that could also inspire future studies on other regions of the subcontinent".

Roger D. Long in the 'History: Reviews of New Books' journal, notes that the book "is a post-modernist tract and an exercise in the usual identity politics that aims to 'reinsert' the people of Kashmir into the history of the state". Long concludes that this is a useful work for Kashmir's history since 1846. Aaron Peron Ogletree reiterates the value of Rai's work on Kashmiri history.

Chandra D. Bhatta calls it an "excellent piece of historical scholarship." Raychaudhri observes that this "highly scholarly work" examines the role of religion in Kashmir's geopolitics since 1846. Rai examines the legitimacy of the Dogra state and argues that its fall lay in its sidelining of the Muslim population in favour of Hindu nationalism. Bhatta concludes by highlighting that the book is a "valuable contribution" to the scholarship on Kashmir.

=== Chapters in books ===
- Rai, Mridu (2018), "Kashmir: From Princely State to Insurgency", Oxford Research Encyclopedia of Asian History, Oxford University Press, doi:10.1093/acrefore/9780190277727.013.184, ISBN 978-0-19-027772-7
- —————, "'To Tear the Mask Off the Face of the Past': Archaeology and Politics in Jammu and Kashmir", in Zutshi, Chitralekha (ed.), New Perspectives on Kashmir: History, Representation, Politics, Cambridge: Cambridge University Press
- ————— (2014), "Is There a Classical Colonialism", in Healy, Roisin; Del Gado, Enrico (eds.), The Shadow of Colonialism in Europe's Modern Past, Palgrave Macmillan, pp. 23–35, ISBN 978-1-137-45074-6
- ————— (2013), "Memorializing 13 July 1931 in Kashmir", in Shah, Fahad (ed.), Of Occupation and Resistance: Writings from Kashmir, Westland and Tranquebar Press, ISBN 978-9383260010
- ————— (2011), "Making a Part Inalienable: Folding Kashmir Into India's Imagination", in Kak, Sanjay (ed.), Until My Freedom Has Come: The New Intifada in Kashmir, Penguin Books, ISBN 978-0143416470
- ————— (2009), "A Hindu Kingdom on the Colonial Periphery: Forging State Legitimacy in Late-Nineteenth Century Kashmir", in Agha, Sameetah; Kolsky, Elizabeth (eds.), Fringes of Empire: People, Places and Spaces in Colonial India, New York: Oxford University Press, ISBN 978-0198060314

=== Journal articles ===
- Rai, Mridu (2018), "The Indian Constituent Assembly and the Making of Hindus and Muslims in Jammu and Kashmir", Asian Affairs, 49 (2): 205–221, doi:10.1080/03068374.2018.1468659, ISSN 0306-8374, S2CID 158781785
- ————— (2014), "Languages of Violence: The Indian State and Insurgent Kashmir", Purba Darshan: A Journal of Asian Studies, 2: 55–87
- ————— (2009), "'To Tear the Mask Off the Face of the Past': Archaeology and Political Protest in Jammu and Kashmir'.", Indian Economic and Social History Review, 46 (3), doi:10.1177/001946460904600306, S2CID 145580876
- ————— (2006), "Jinnah and the Demise of a Hindu Politician?", History Workshop Journal, 62 (1): 232–240, doi:10.1093/hwj/dbl007

=== Review essays ===
- Rai, Mridu (2015), "The Black Hole That (N)Ever Was", History Workshop Journal, 79: 266–274, doi:10.1093/hwj/dbu032

=== Book reviews ===
- Rai, Mridu (2012), "Review of Aman Sethi, A Free Man: A True Story of Life and Death in Delhi (W.W. Norton, October 2012)", San Francisco Chronicle
- ————— (2011), "Review of Amitabh Mattoo and Souresh Roy, 'Summer of Discontent: Considering Conditions in Kashmir'", Harvard International Review
- ————— (2011), "Review of Joseph Lelyveld, Great Soul: Mahatma Gandhi and His Struggle with India, (Alfred A. Knopf, 2011)", San Francisco Chronicle
- ————— (2007), "Review of Nicholas B. Dirks, The Scandal of Empire: India and the Creation of Imperial Britain (Cambridge, MA: The Belknap Press of the Harvard University Press, 2006)", Victorian Studies, 50 (1): 164–166, doi:10.2979/vic.2007.50.1.164, S2CID 142778240
- ————— (2006), "Review of Susanne Hoeber Rudolph and Lloyd I. Rudolph, Reversing the Gaze: Amar Singh's Diary: A Colonial Subject's Narrative of Imperial India (Westview Press, 2002)", Journal of Modern History, 78 (4): 949–951, doi:10.1086/511217
- ————— (2005), "Review of Burkhard Schnepel, The Jungle Kings: Ethnohistorical Aspects of Politics and Ritual in Orissa (New Delhi: Manohar, 2002)", The Indian Economic and Social History Review, 42 (3): 409–412
