= Jammu district =

- District of Jammu and Kashmir administered by India
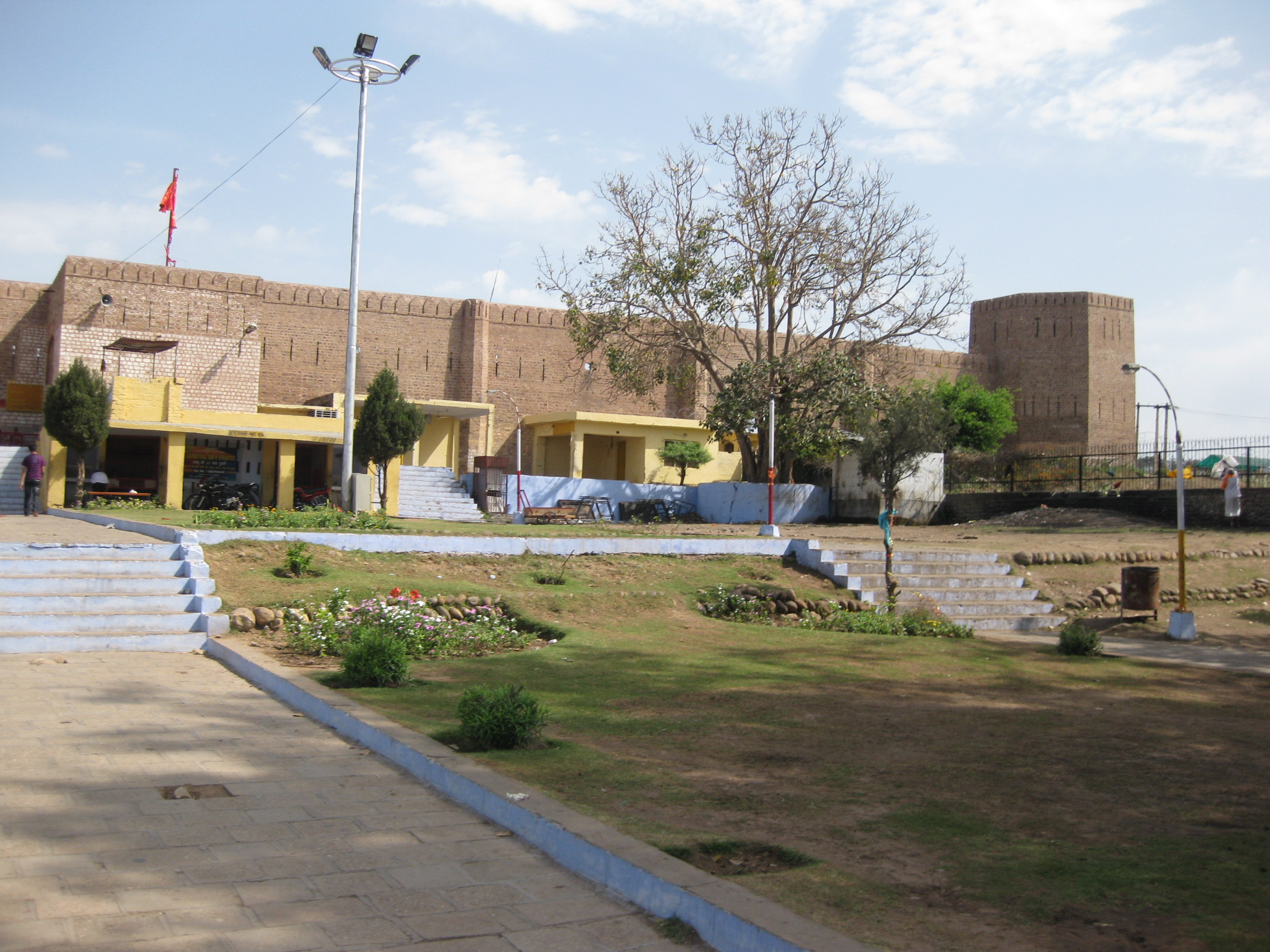
- Bahu Fort, Jammu, India

- Interactive map of Jammu district
- Coordinates (Jammu): 32.73°N 74.87°E
- Administering country: India
- Union territory: Jammu and Kashmir
- Division: Jammu
- Headquarters: Jammu

Government
  - District Magistrate: Dr. Rakesh Minhas(IAS)
  - Lok Sabha constituencies: Jammu (Lok Sabha constituency)
  - Vidhan Sabha constituencies: 11

Area
  - Total: 2,342 km^{2} (904 sq mi)
  - Urban: 252.13 km^{2} (97.35 sq mi)
  - Rural: 2,089.87 km^{2} (806.90 sq mi)

Population (2011)
  - Total: 1,529,958
  - Density: 653.3/km^{2} (1,692/sq mi)
  - Urban: 765,013
  - Rural: 764,945

Demographics
  - Literacy: 83.45%
  - Sex ratio: 880
- Time zone: UTC+05:30 (IST)
- Vehicle registration: JK-02
- Website: https://jammu.nic.in/

Jammu district is an administrative district of the Jammu division of Indian-administered Jammu and Kashmir in the disputed Kashmir region. It is the most populous district in the Jammu division.

== Administrative divisions ==
Jammu District has 7 subdivisions:

- Jammu South
- Jammu North
- Pura
- Marh
- Akhnoor
- Chowki Choura
- Khour

There are 21 tehsils:

- Akhnoor
- Arnia
- Bahu
- Bhalwal
- Bishnah
- Chowki Choura
- Dansal
- Jammu
- Jammu North
- Jammu South
- Jammu West
- Jourian
- Kharah Balli
- Khour
- Maira Mandrian
- Mandal
- Marh
- Nagrota
- Pargwal
- Ranbir Singh Pura
- Suchetgarh

There are 20 Blocks:

- Akhnoor
- Arnia
- Bhalwal
- Bhalwal Brahmana
- Bishnah
- Chowki Choura
- Dansal
- Khour
- Kharah Balli
- Maira Mandrian
- Mandal
- Marh
- Mathwar
- Miran Sahib
- Nagrota
- Pargwal
- Pura
- Samwan
- Satwari
- Suchetgarh

== Demographics ==
Historical population
Year	Pop.	±%
1901	291,399	—
1911	279,051	−4.2%
1921	285,361	+2.3%
1931	316,647	+11.0%
1941	364,253	+15.0%
1951	401,532	+10.2%
1961	438,810	+9.3%
1971	616,396	+40.5%
1981	792,490	+28.6%
1991	1,043,302	+31.6%
2001	1,357,077	+30.1%
2011	1,529,958	+12.7%
† 1951 and 1991 populations are estimated Source: Census of India

According to the 2011 census Jammu district has a population of 1,526,406, roughly equal to the nation of Gabon or the US state of Hawaii. This gives it a ranking of 326th in India (out of a total of 640). The district has a population density of 596 inhabitants per square kilometre (1,540/sq mi) . Its population growth rate over the decade 2001-2011 was 12.48%. Jammu has a sex ratio of 871 females for every 1000 males, and a literacy rate of 83.98%. 50.00% of the population lives in urban areas. The Scheduled Castes and Scheduled Tribes account for 24.71% and 4.52% of the population of the district.

Religion in Jammu district (2011)
Religion	Percent
Hinduism	84.27%
Sikhism	7.47%
Islam	7.03%
Christianity	0.79%
Other or not stated	0.44%

Jammu district: religion, gender ratio, and % urban of population, according to the 2011 Census.
	Hindu	Muslim	Christian	Sikh	Buddhist	Jain	Other	Not stated	Total
Total	1,289,240	107,489	12,104	114,272	470	1,987	321	4,075	1,529,958
Total	84.27%	7.03%	0.79%	7.47%	0.03%	0.13%	0.02%	0.27%	100.00%
Male	685,679	56,927	6,455	61,098	266	1,038	171	2,187	813,821
Female	603,561	50,562	5,649	53,174	204	949	150	1,888	716,137
Gender ratio (% female)	46.8%	47.0%	46.7%	46.5%	43.4%	47.8%	46.7%	46.3%	46.8%
Sex ratio (no. of females per 1,000 males)	880	888	875	870	–	914	–	863	880
Urban	621,495	54,157	9,599	75,307	361	1,949	156	1,989	765,013
Rural	667,745	53,332	2,505	38,965	109	38	165	2,086	764,945
% Urban	48.2%	50.4%	79.3%	65.9%	76.8%	98.1%	48.6%	48.8%	50.0%

Religious composition of Jammu district and its sub-districts
Sub-district	Population	Hindu	Muslim	Sikh	Others
Jammu district	1,529,958	84.27%	7.03%	7.47%	1.24%
Akhnoor	250,446	94.74%	2.45%	1.87%	0.94%
Jammu	970,335	80.98%	9.73%	7.72%	1.57%
Ranbir Singh Pora	197,739	81.14%	2.53%	15.84%	0.49%
Bishnah	111,438	94.88%	1.75%	3.03%	0.33%

Note: "Others" includes Christians, Buddhists, Jains, people following other religions and persuasions, and people whose religion was not stated.

=== Languages ===
The most widely spoken language of Jammu is Dogri. Other languages spoken are Punjabi, Urdu, Hindi, Kashmiri, Gojri and English. Hindi is widely spoken as a second language. Punjabi is mainly spoken by the Sikhs and some descendants of Partition refugees from West Punjab, while Kashmiri is mainly spoken by the refugee Kashmiri Pandits in Jammu city.

Languages of Jammu district (2011)
1. Dogri (70.8%)
2. Punjabi (8.10%)
3. Kashmiri (6.00%)
4. Pahari (5.88%)
5. Gojri (3.86%)
6. Others (5.31%)
