= Ranbir Singh of Jammu and Kashmir =

Maharaja of Jammu and Kashmir from 1856 to 1885

Ranbir Singh
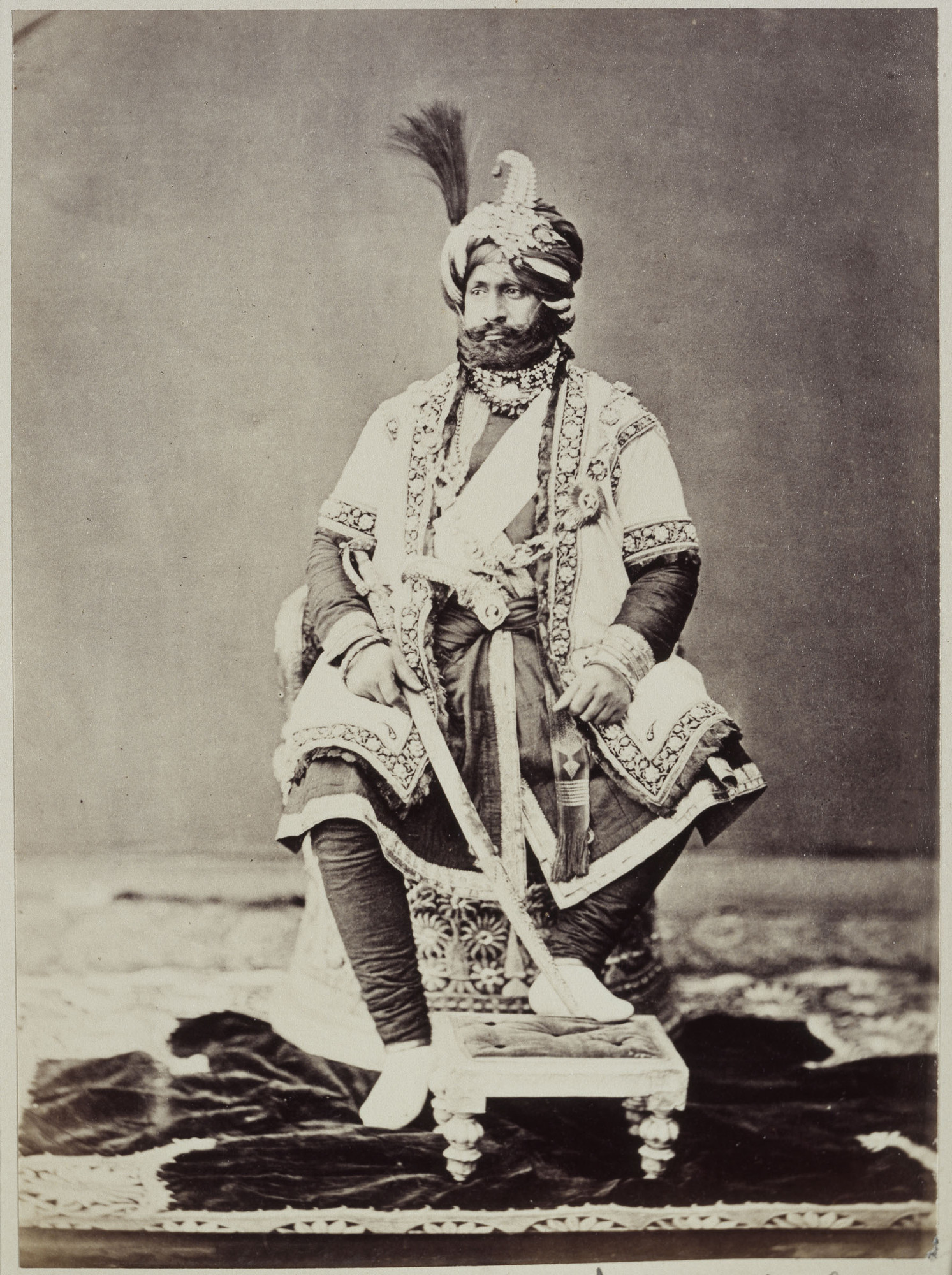
- Portrait c. 1887

Maharaja of Jammu and Kashmir
- Reign: 20 February 1856 – 12 September 1885
- Predecessor: Gulab Singh
- Successor: Pratap Singh
- Born: August 1830; Ramgarh, (present-day Jammu and Kashmir, India)
- Died: 12 September 1885 (aged 55)
- Issue: Pratap Singh and 5 others
- House: Dogra dynasty
- Father: Gulab Singh
- Mother: Rani Rakwal
- Religion: Hinduism

Ranbir Singh GCIE (August 1830 – 12 September 1885) was Maharaja of Jammu and Kashmir belonging to the Dogra dynasty from 1856 until his death in 1885.

Ranbir Singh was the third son of Gulab Singh, the founder of the Jammu and Kashmir state. Ranbir Singh ascended the throne in 1856 after Gulab Singh's abdication due to his poor health. Unlike European women and children, Indian mutineers were not allowed to take refuge in his state. He also sent his troops to help the British to besiege Delhi. He was subsequently rewarded for his behaviour during the mutiny. He went on to annex Gilgit which had previously witnessed a rebellion against the state. The princely states of Hunza and Nagar started paying tributes to Jammu and Kashmir during his reign. He also established a modern judicial system. Civil and criminal laws were compiled into the Ranbir Penal Code during his reign. Ranbir Singh was a scholar of Sanskrit and Persian languages and had many books translated.

== Early life ==
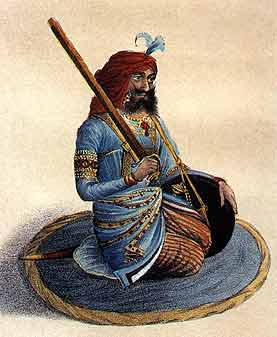
Raja Suchet Singh, the issueless uncle of Ranbir Singh whom adopted him

Singh was born at Ramgarh, Jammu and Kashmir in August 1830. He was the third son of Maharaja Gulab Singh. His mother Rakwal Maharani was the first wife of Gulab Singh. Ranbir Singh was adopted by Raja Suchet Singh, his childless uncle, and inherited all his jagirs upon his death in 1844.

== Reign ==
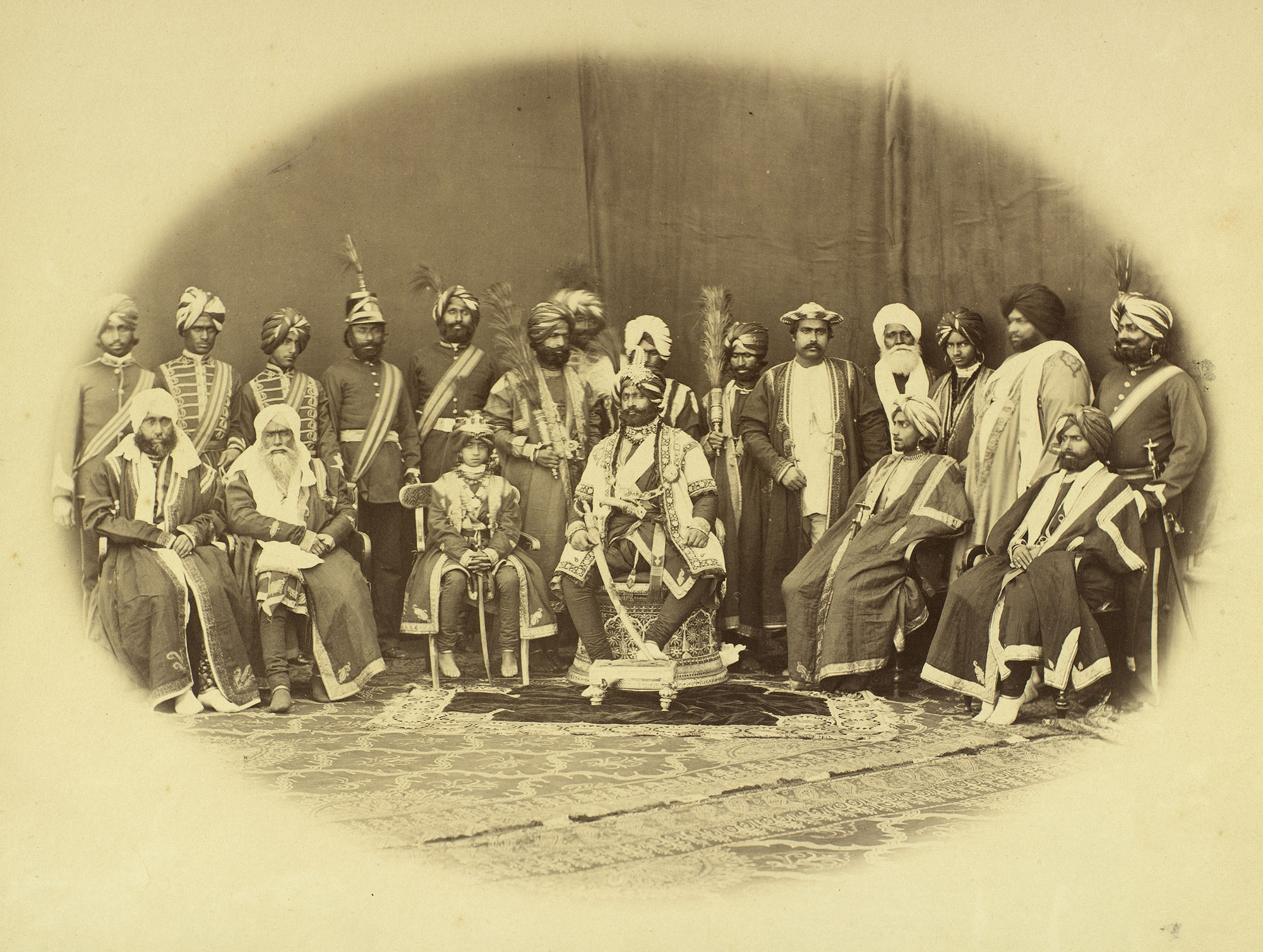
Photograph of Maharaja Ranbir Singh of Jammu & Kashmir State with suite, Bourne & Shepherd, ca.1860–1876

Ranbir Singh's father Maharaja Gulab Singh suffered from edema. With his health deteriorating, he decided to abdicate in early 1856. Subsequently, Ranbir Singh ascended the throne of Jammu and Kashmir on 20 February 1856. Gulab Singh was appointed governor of Kashmir.

=== Sepoy Mutiny ===
In 1857, the Sepoy Mutiny, an uprising against the British rule broke mainly in present-day Delhi and Uttar Pradesh. Under the leadership of Ranbir and Gulab Singh, the state allied with the British. They sent money to the British troops stationed at Punjab. The mutineers were not allowed to take asylum in the state, which bordered the then British India. British women and children took refuge in the Kashmir Valley. After the death of Gulab Singh, Ranbir Singh sent a battalion of Jammu and Kashmiri soldiers to help the British to besiege Delhi. He was subsequently rewarded for his loyalty to the British. The Treaty of Amritsar was amended in 1860 and a new provision was inserted which allowed a Dogra ruler to adopt a child from a collateral branch of the family. Previously, according to the treaty, the state would have been annexed by the British if a ruler did not have a natural heir. He was also rewarded with the Most Exalted Order of the Star of India in 1862. His gun salute was increased from 19 to 21 guns.

=== Annexation of Gilgit ===
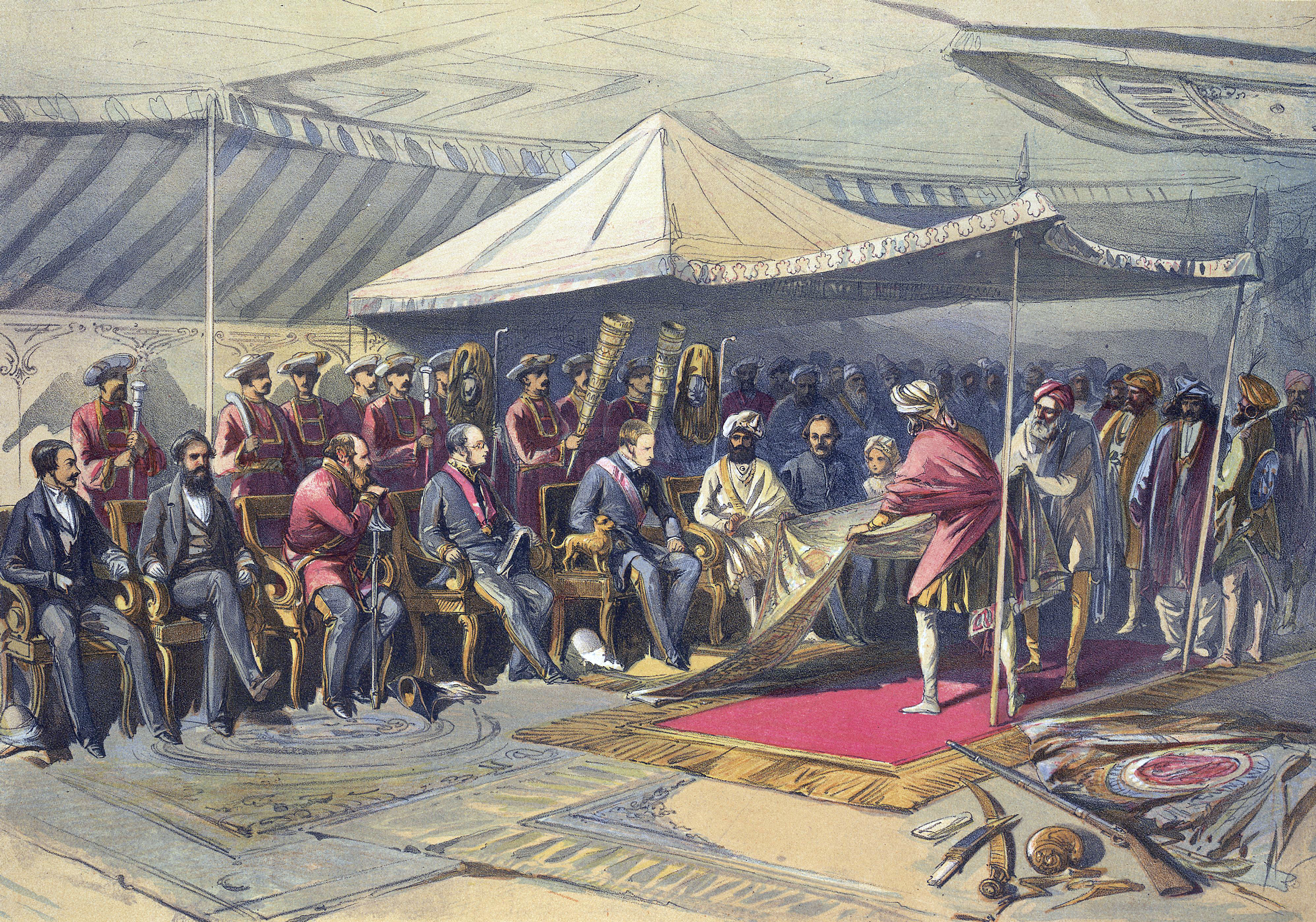
Charles John Canning meets Maharaja Ranbir Singh, March 9, 1860. It illustrates the return visit to the Maharaja, during the viceroy's progress through upper India. The Maharaja had come to meet him a day earlier. Maharaja Ranbir Singh's tent was decorated with cashmere shawls, including silk and gold materials that were placed beneath the chair reserved for the viceroy.

During the final years of Gulab Singh's reign, a rebellion in Gilgit caused heavy casualties to the Dogra troops. In 1860, Ranbir Singh sent his army under the leadership of Colonel Devi Singh Narania, Colonel Bijai Singh and General Hoshiara Singh to Gilgit. They successfully recaptured Gilgit. By the end of 1870, the states of Hunza and Nagar started paying tributes to Jammu and Kashmir. In return, they received an annual subsidy.

=== Reforms ===
Ranbir Singh established a modern judicial system. Civil and criminal laws were written and consolidated into the Ranbir Penal Code which were followed in the Indian part of Jammu and Kashmir. Now it has been removed as the Parliament of India has passed the bill to scrap provisions of Article 370 of the Indian Constitution on 5 August 2019. The judicial system was handed over to the executive officers. Separate prisons were built for political prisoners. Ranbir Singh organized two durbars in a day in which he heard petitions.

Ranbir Singh founded separate departments for foreign affairs, home affairs, civil affairs and army. He founded a silk factory in the state. He also promoted its trade. The shawl industry flourished during his reign which provided employment and a minimum income to his subjects.

=== Opposition to a Resident ===
As per the Treaty of Amritsar, there was no provision for the appointment of a Resident in the state. With the appointment of an Officer-on-Special-Duty in 1851, the idea of appointing a Resident started dominating amongst the British government. In 1873, The Lord Northbrook, the then Governor-General of India wrote to Ranbir Singh about a proposal to appoint a British Resident in Kashmir. However, Singh rejected such a proposal. He submitted a memorandum and reminded the services of Gulab Singh to the British. He also reminded the British that unlike most of the monarchs of princely states, he refused to take any jagir as a gift in lieu of his services during the Sepoy Mutiny.

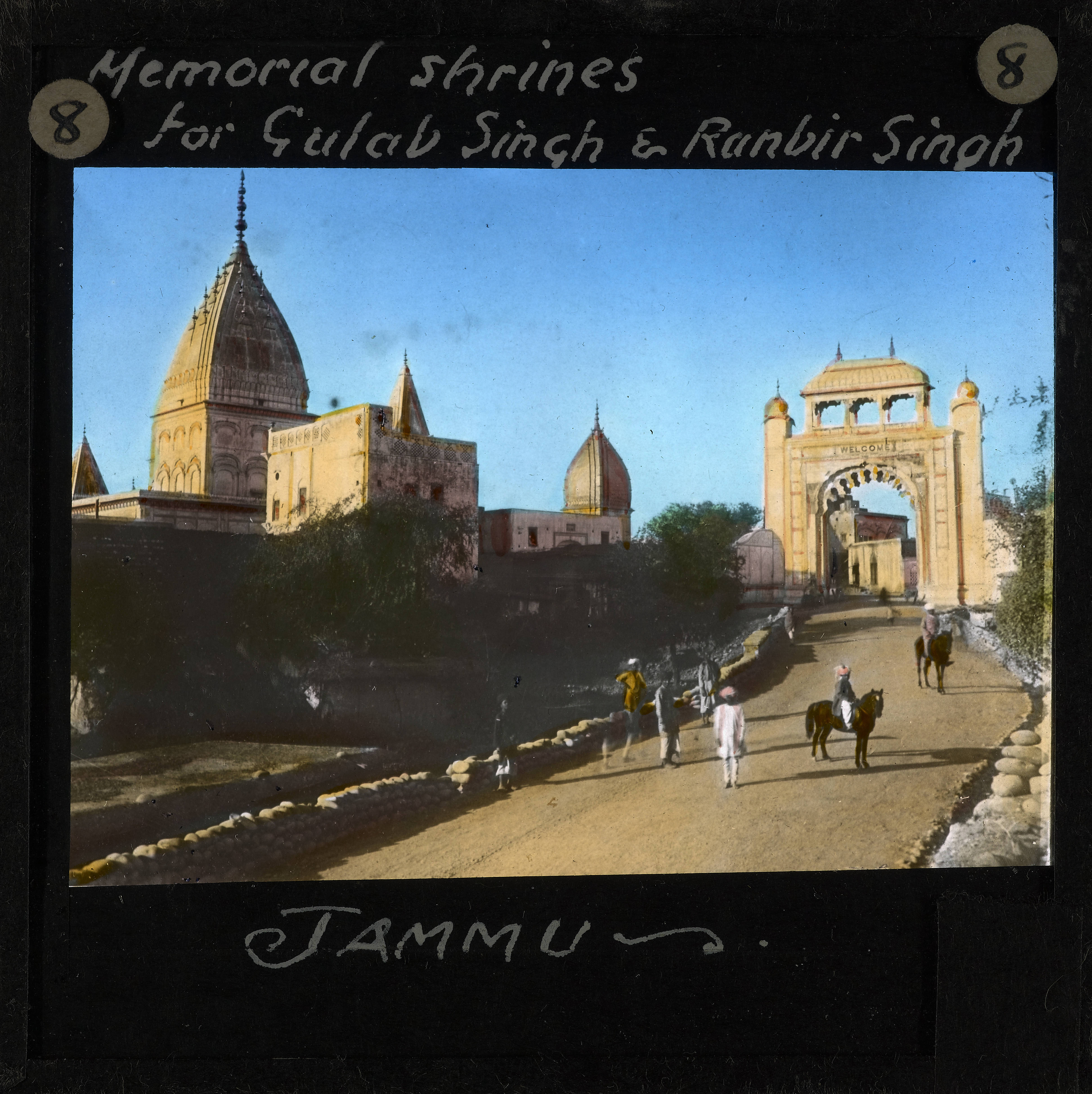
Memorial shrines at Jammu for Gulab Singh and Ranbir Singh, about 1910

In 1882, Ranbir Singh wrote to the British government and requested them to nominate his younger son Amar Singh as his successor. He felt that Amar Singh was more wise than his siblings - Pratap Singh and Ram Singh. On 12 September 1885, Ranbir Singh died. Governor-general The Lord Ripon announced that Pratap Singh would succeed him. In return, Pratap Singh yielded to the British demand of appointing a Resident.

== Personal life ==
=== Interests ===
Ranbir Singh followed the footsteps of Zain-ul-Abidin and Avantivarman, who were former rulers of Kashmir. He employed pandits and maulvis to translate and transliterate religious texts. Sir Aurel Stein catalogued 5,000 such works. Besides religious books, books on medical sciences were also translated into Urdu, Dogri and Hindi.

Ranbir Singh was a scholar of Sanskrit and Persian languages. He was also fond of speaking Pashto. He conversed with his Afghan bodyguards in Pashto. He established a Sanskrit pathshaala in the complex of the Raghunath Temple and Ranveer Sanskrit Vidyalaya in Varanasi. Grammar, philosophy, poetry, algebra, Euclidean geometry and Vedas were taught in it.

Although Ranbir Singh received semi-formal education, he was interested in spreading education amongst the masses. He donated ₹100,000 (equivalent to ₹54 million or US$570,000 in 2023) to University of the Punjab at the time of its establishment in 1882. In return he was made the first fellow of the university. Ranbir Singh frequently met scholars of various subjects and discussed the subjects with them.

=== Family ===
In June 1843, Ranbir Singh married Subh Devi Sahiba, the daughter of the raja of Siba State. In October 1848, he married a princess of Bilaspur state. In July 1871, he married for a third time to Charak Maharani Krishna Devi. After 1880, he married twice.

Singh had six children including four sons:

Name	Mother	Born	Died	Children
Pratap Singh	Subh Devi Sahiba	18 July 1848	23 September 1925	One son, one daughter
Sir Ram Singh	Kahluriya Maharani	31 May 1861	22 June 1899	Bahawal Singh, Narayan Singh, one daughter
Sir Amar Singh	Subh Devi Sahiba	14 January 1864	26 March 1909	Hari Singh
Lakshman Singh	Krishna Devi	1870	September 1875	None

== Bibliography ==
- Bakshi, S.R. (1998), Kashmir History and People, New Delhi: Sarup and Sons, ISBN 8185431965
- Charak, Sukhdev Singh (1985), Life and times of Maharaja Ranbir Singh, 1830-1885, Jay and Kay Book House
- Kalla, Krishan Lal (1985), The Literary Heritage of Kashmir, Mittal Publications
- Yasin, Madhvi (1984), British Paramountcy in Kashmir, 1876-1894, ISBN 9788171560790
- Rai, Mridu (2004), Hindu Rulers, Muslim Subjects: Islam, Rights, and the History of Kashmir, London: C. Hurst & Co, ISBN 1850656614
- Raina, Mohini Qasba (2014). Kashur The Kashmiri Speaking People. Partridge Publishing Singapore. p. 305. ISBN 9781482899450.
- Schofield, Victoria (2003), Kashmir in Conflict: India, Pakistan and the Unending War, London New York: I.B.Tauris, ISBN 9781860648984

Ranbir Singh of Jammu and Kashmir Dogra dynasty Born: August 1830 Died: 12 September 1885
Regnal titles
Preceded by Maharaja Gulab Singh I	Maharaja of Jammu and Kashmir; 1857–1885	Succeeded by Maharaja Pratap Singh I
