= Coffee =

Brewed beverage

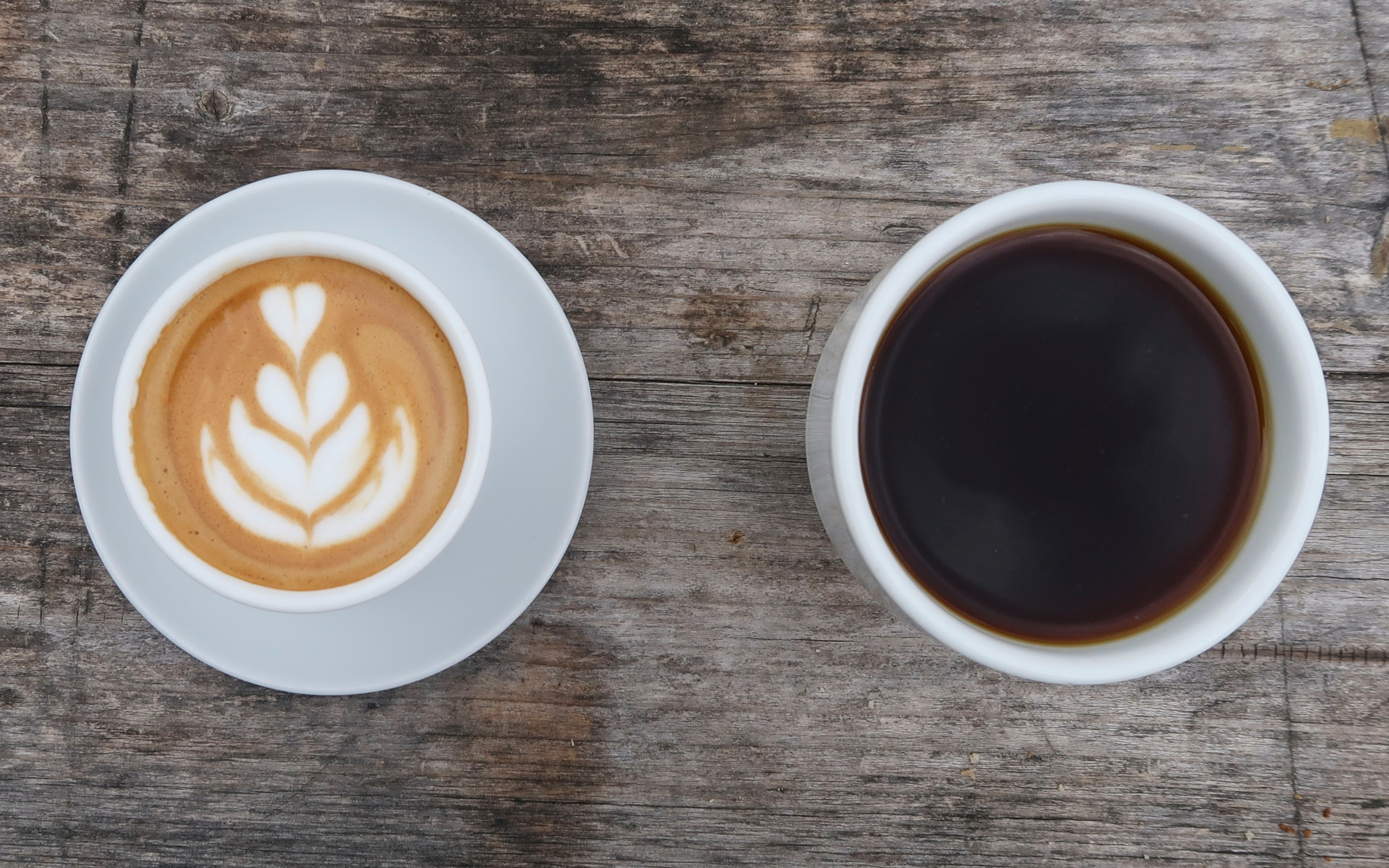
- Latte and black filtered coffee
- Type: Usually hot; can be iced
- Origin: Yemen
- Introduced: 15th century
- Color: Black, dark brown, light brown, beige
- Flavor: Distinctive, somewhat bitter
- Ingredients: Roasted coffee beans
- Standard drinkware: Mug

Coffee is a beverage brewed from roasted, ground coffee beans. Dark-colored and bitter, coffee has a stimulating effect on humans due to its caffeine content; however decaffeinated coffee is also commercially available. There are also various coffee substitutes.

Coffee production begins when the seeds from coffee cherries, the Coffea plant's fruits, are separated to produce unroasted green coffee beans. The "beans" are roasted and then ground into fine particles. Coffee is brewed from the ground roasted beans, which are typically steeped in hot water before being filtered out. It is usually served hot, although chilled or iced coffee is common. Coffee can be prepared and presented in a variety of ways, e.g., espresso, French press, caffè latte, or already-brewed canned coffee. Sugar, sugar substitutes, milk, and cream are often added and change the flavor.

Though coffee has become a global commodity, it has a history tied to food traditions around the Red Sea. The earliest reports of coffee drinking pertain to the plant's use among the Sufis of Yemen in southern Arabia in the middle of the 15th century. Up to the end of the 17th century, most of the world's coffee was imported from Yemen. As it gained in popularity, coffee started to be cultivated in Java in the 17th century and the Americas from the 18th century.

The two most commonly grown coffee bean types are C. arabica and C. robusta. Coffee plants are cultivated in over 70 countries, primarily in the equatorial regions of the Americas, Southeast Asia, the Indian subcontinent, and Africa. Green, unroasted coffee is traded as an agricultural commodity. The global coffee industry was worth US$495.50 billion in 2023. In 2023, Brazil was the leading grower of coffee beans, producing 31% of the world's total, followed by Vietnam. While coffee sales reach billions of dollars annually worldwide, coffee farmers disproportionately live in poverty. Critics of the coffee industry have pointed to its negative impact on the environment, including clearing of land for coffee growing and water use.

== Etymology ==
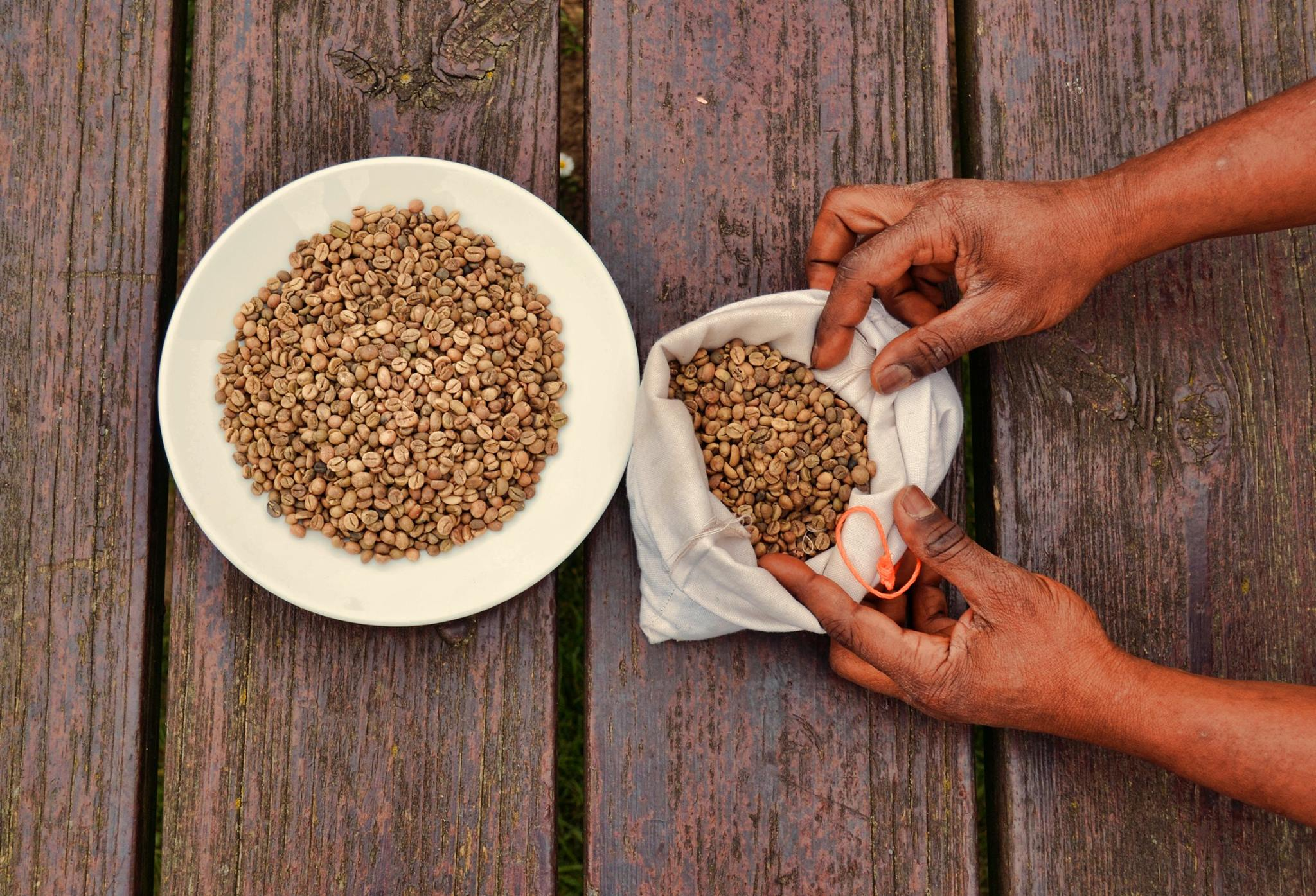
Green coffee describes the beans before roasting.

The word coffee entered the English language in 1582 via the Dutch koffie, borrowed from the Ottoman Turkish kahve (قهوه), borrowed from the Arabic qahwah (قَهْوَة). Medieval Arabic lexicons traditionally held that the etymology of qahwah meant 'wine', given its distinctly dark color, and was derived from the verb qahiya (قَهِيَ), 'to have no appetite'. The word qahwah most likely meant 'the dark one', referring to the brew or the bean.

qahwah is not the name of the bean, which are known in Arabic as bunn and in Cushitic languages as būn. Semitic languages have the root qhh, 'dark color', which became a natural designation for the beverage. Its cognates include the Hebrew qehe(h) 'dulling' and the Aramaic qahey ('give acrid taste to'). Although etymologists have connected it with a word meaning 'wine', it is also thought to be from the Kaffa region of Ethiopia.

The terms coffee pot and coffee break originated in 1705 and 1952, respectively.

== History ==
=== Legendary accounts and myths ===
There are multiple anecdotal origin stories which lack evidence. Ralph S. Hattox records traditions in which the Islamic prophet Muhammad is said to have been introduced to a stimulating beverage by the Angel Gabriel, who recommended it for its restorative qualities. In another commonly repeated legend, Kaldi, a 9th-century Ethiopian or Arab goatherd, first observed the coffee plant after seeing his flock energized by chewing on the plant. This legend does not appear before 1671, indicating the story is likely apocryphal, first being related by Antoine Faustus Nairon, a Maronite professor of Oriental languages and author of one of the first printed treatises devoted to coffee, De Saluberrima potione Cahue seu Cafe nuncupata Discurscus (Rome, 1671), which describes a camel or goat herder in the Kingdom of Ayaman, Arabia Felix. The herder is unnamed in the earliest account and the name Kaldi appears to be a later invention from the twentieth century. Another legend attributes the discovery of coffee to a Sheikh Omar. Starving after being exiled from Mokha, Omar found berries. After attempting to chew and roast them, Omar boiled them, which yielded a liquid that revitalized and sustained him.

=== Historical transmission ===
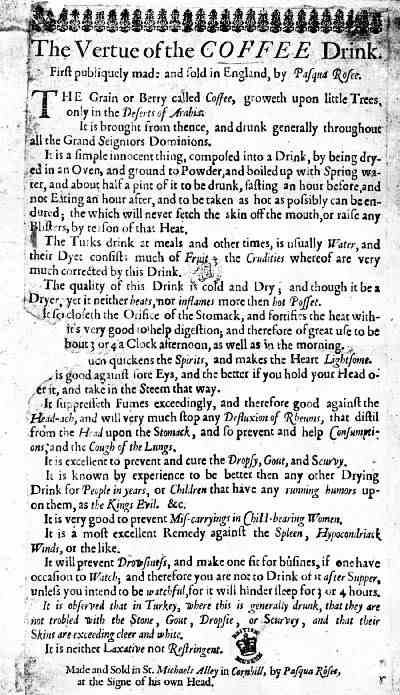
A 1652 handbill advertising coffee for sale in St. Michael's Alley, London

The earliest possible references to the coffee bean and its qualities appear in al-Razi's 10th-century al-Hawi (Note: A text extant mainly in Latin quotations whose Arabic original is largely lost, the section on coffee of which was quoted by Philippe Sylvestre Dufour in 1684) and in Avicenna's 11th-century The Canon of Medicine (Note: The section of which possibly talks about coffee is also only extant in Latin translation.) both which describe a plant component called bunchum as hot and dry (Note: Avicenna adds that some instead consider it cold)—with al-Razi reporting beneficial effects for the stomach and Avicenna also adding claims for the skin and body odor. According to later accounts, bunchum was made from a root rather than from coffee beans. There is no confirmed evidence, either historical or archaeological, of coffee as a drink being consumed before the 15th century. The drink appears to be a relatively recent development. By the late 15th century, coffee drinking was well established among Sufi communities in Yemen.

An early writer on coffee was Abd al-Qadir al-Jaziri of Ottoman Iraq, who in 1587 compiled a work tracing the history and legal controversies of coffee in his ʿUmdat al-ṣafwa fī ḥill al-qahwa (عمدة الصفوة في حل القهوة), in which he claims that the coffee bean originated in the "land of Sa'ad ad-Din, and the country of Abyssinia, and of the Jabart, and other places of the land of ‘Ajam, but the time of its first use is unknown, nor do we know the reason." Al-Jazīrī asserts that coffee was introduced to Cairo at the start of the 16th century by Sufi devotees.

Coffee appears to have been likely collected from wild plants, with some indications that its use expanded from the 14th century among certain Islamized groups in southeastern Ethiopia, though direct evidence for early consumption remains scarce. The use of coffee is believed to have spread across the Red Sea to the Rasulid sultanate of Yemen, who maintained cultural and commercial ties with the Adal Sultanate. Its consumption first appears in Yemen, particularly in regions such as Aden, Mocha and Zabid during the 15th century. The 16th-century scholar Ibn Hajar al-Haytami writes about the plant's development from a tree in the Zeila region. In 1542, a Portuguese crew met with a ship from Zeila transporting clarified butter and coffee to Al-Shihr in Yemen.

Other sources of coffee drinking or knowledge of the coffee tree appear in the middle of the 15th century in the accounts of Ahmed al-Ghaffar in Yemen, where coffee seeds were first roasted and brewed in a similar way to how it is prepared now. Coffee was used by Sufi circles to stay awake for their religious rituals. Accounts differ on the origin of the coffee plant before its appearance in Yemen. Coffee may have been introduced to Yemen from Ethiopia via the Red Sea trade. One account credits Muhammad Ibn Sa'd al-Dhabḥani for bringing coffee to Aden from the Somali coast, other early accounts say Ali ben Omar of the Shadhili Sufi order was the first to introduce coffee to Arabia. By the 16th century, coffee had reached the rest of the Middle East and North Africa.

In 1583, Leonhard Rauwolf, a German physician, gave this description of coffee after returning from a ten-year trip to the Near East:

A beverage as black as ink, useful against numerous illnesses, particularly those of the stomach. Its consumers take it in the morning, quite frankly, in a porcelain cup passed around and from which each one drinks a cupful. It is composed of water and the fruit from a bush called bunnu.

— Léonard Rauwolf, Reise in die Morgenländer (in German)

Within the Ottoman Empire, the first coffeehouse opened in 1555 in Tahtakale, Istanbul. Since Tahtakale is to the West of the Bosporus, this would likely have been the first coffee house in Europe. Thriving trade brought many goods, including coffee, from the Ottoman Empire to Venice. Coffee became more widely accepted in Europe after Pope Clement VIII declared it a Christian beverage in 1600, despite appeals to ban the "Muslim drink". Coffee had spread to Italy by 1600 and then to the rest of Europe, Indonesia, and the Americas. The first European coffeehouse outside of the Ottoman Empire opened in Venice in 1647.

=== As a colonial import ===
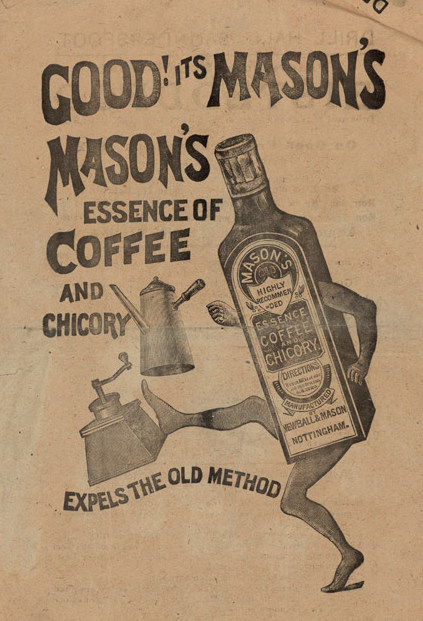
A late 19th-century advertisement for coffee essence

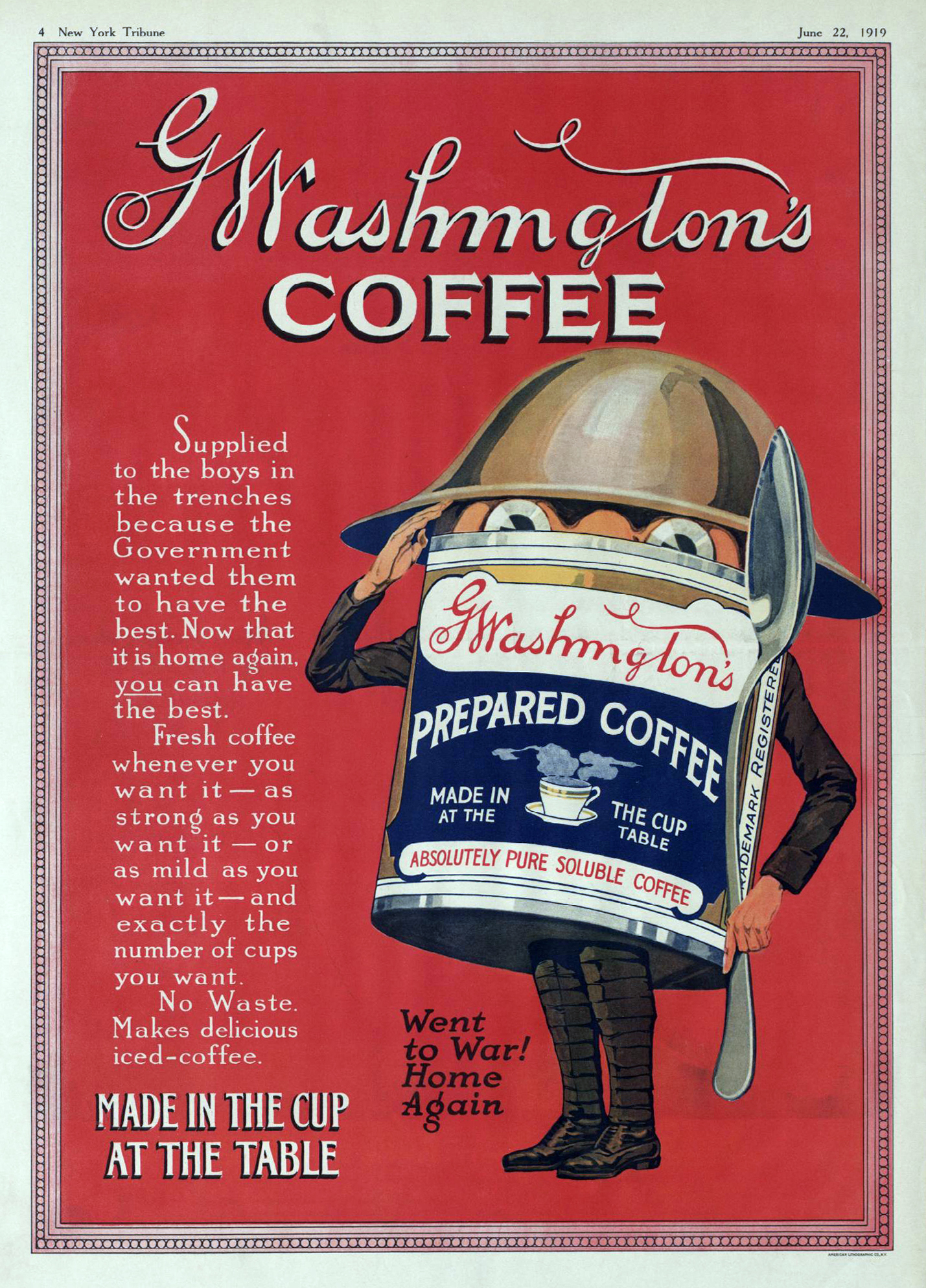
A 1919 advertisement for G Washington's Coffee. The inventor George Washington developed methods for large scale commercial manufacture of instant coffee.

The Dutch East India Company was the first to import coffee on a large scale. The Dutch later grew the crop in Java and Ceylon. The first exports of Indonesian coffee from Java to the Netherlands occurred in 1711.

Through the efforts of the British East India Company, coffee became popular in England. In a diary entry of May 1637, John Evelyn records tasting the drink at Oxford, where it had been brought by a student of Balliol College from Crete named Nathaniel Conopios of Crete. Oxford's Queen's Lane Coffee House, established in 1654, is still in existence today. Coffee was introduced in France in 1657 and in Austria and Poland after the 1683 Battle of Vienna, when coffee was captured from supplies of the defeated Turks.

When coffee reached North America during the Colonial period, it was initially not as successful as in Europe, as alcoholic beverages remained more popular. During the Revolutionary War, the demand for coffee increased so much that dealers had to hoard their scarce supplies and raise prices dramatically; this was also due to the reduced availability of tea from British merchants, and a general resolution among many Americans to avoid drinking tea following the 1773 Boston Tea Party.

During the 18th century, coffee consumption declined in Britain, giving way to tea drinking. Tea was simpler to make and had become cheaper with the British conquest of India and the tea industry there. During the Age of Sail, seamen aboard ships of the British Royal Navy made substitute coffee by dissolving burnt bread in hot water. According to Captain Haines, who was the colonial administrator of Aden (1839–1854), Mokha historically imported up to two-thirds of its coffee from Berbera-based merchants before the coffee trade of Mokha was captured by British-controlled Aden in the 19th century. After that, much of the Ethiopian coffee was exported to Aden via Berbera.

Frenchman Gabriel de Clieu took a coffee plant to the French territory of Martinique in the Caribbean in the 1720s, from which much of the world's cultivated arabica coffee is descended. Coffee thrived in the climate and was conveyed across the Americas. Coffee was cultivated in Saint-Domingue, now Haiti, from 1734, and by 1788 it supplied half the world's coffee. The conditions that the enslaved people worked in on coffee plantations were a factor in the Haitian Revolution, and the coffee industry never fully recovered there.

=== Mass production ===
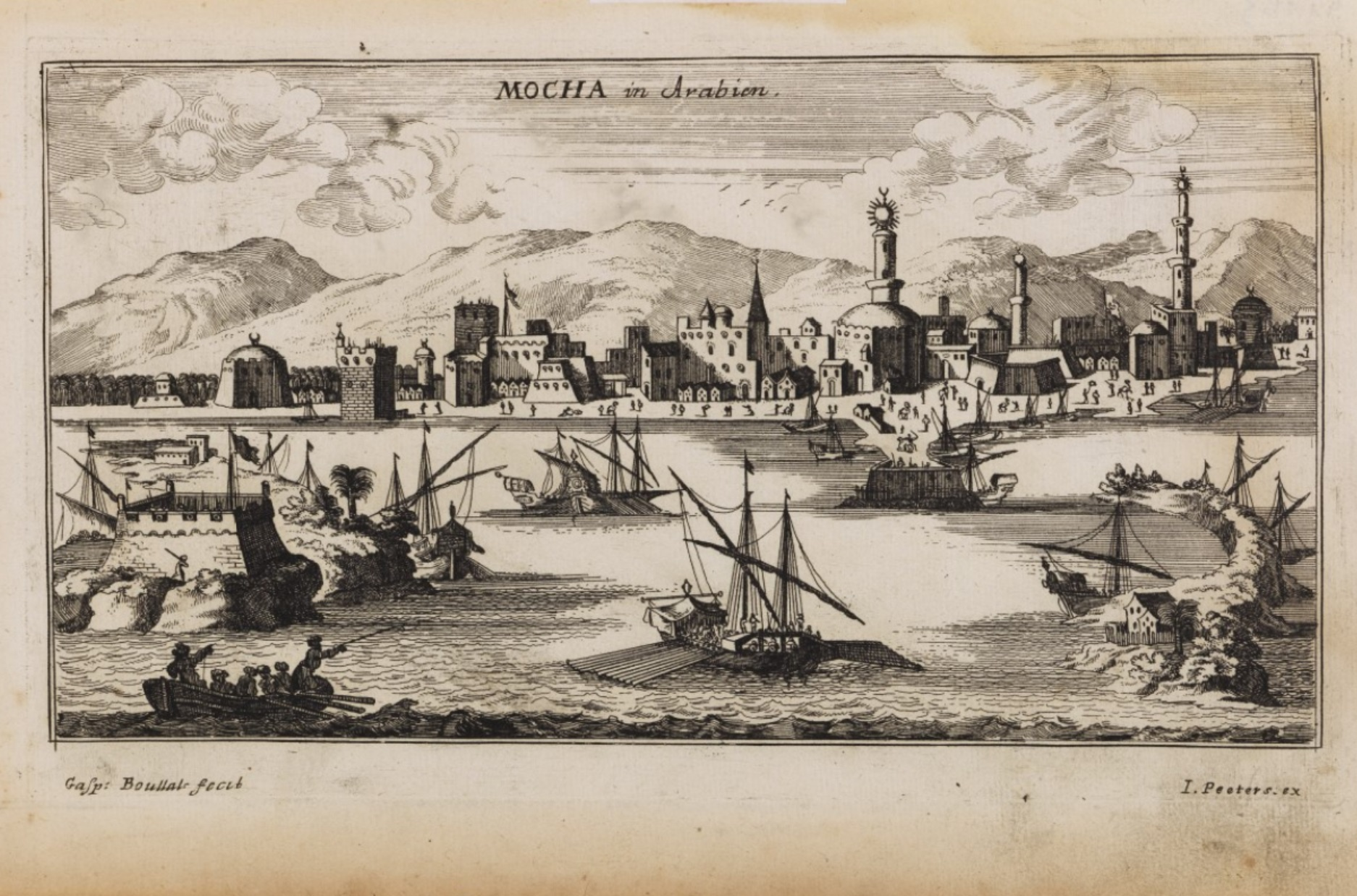
The port city Mocha in Yemen 1692.

In the late 16th century, Yemen developed a booming coffee economy. Farmers grew coffee on mountain terraces above the Tihamah plain, and trade routes linked its ports to Jeddah and Cairo. By the 17th century, coffee had surpassed the global spice trade. Up to the end of the 17th century, Yemen was the world's main producer for coffee, and Mocha was the world's largest shipping port for coffee.

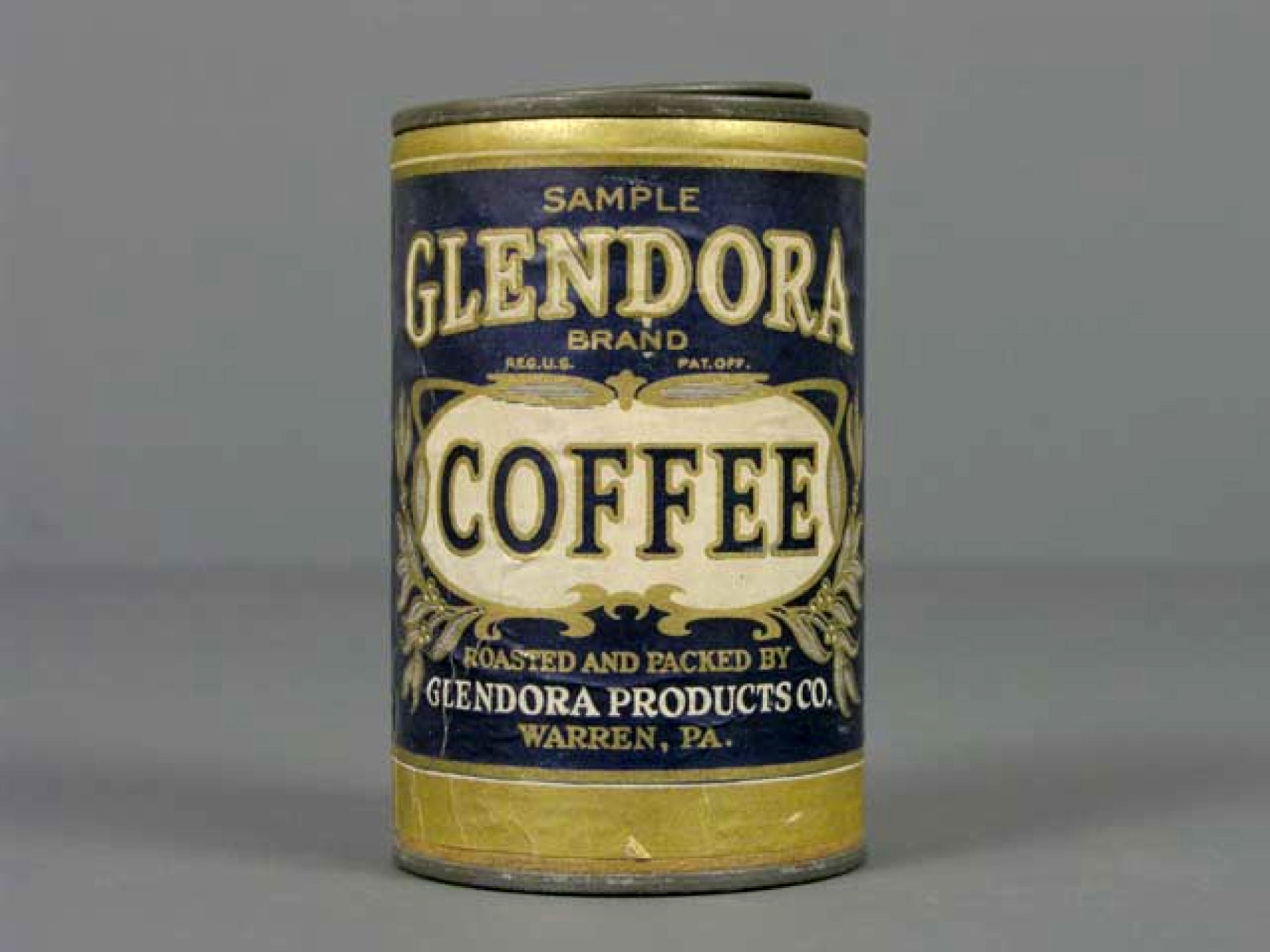
A coffee can from the first half of the 20th century. From the Museo del Objeto del Objeto collection.

Coffee was introduced to Brazil in 1727, but its cultivation did not gather momentum until independence in 1822. After this time, massive tracts of rainforest were cleared for coffee plantations, first around Rio de Janeiro and later São Paulo. Brazil went from having essentially no coffee exports in 1800 to being a significant regional producer in 1830, to being the largest producer in the world by 1852. Between 1910 and 1920, Brazil exported around 70% of the world's coffee; Colombia, Guatemala, and Venezuela exported 15%; and Old World production accounted for less than 5% of world exports.

Many countries in Central America took up cultivation in the latter half of the 19th century, and almost all were involved in the large-scale displacement and exploitation of indigenous people. Harsh conditions led to many uprisings, coups, and bloody suppression of peasants. The notable exception was Costa Rica, where a lack of ready labor prevented the formation of large farms. Smaller farms and more egalitarian conditions ameliorated unrest over the 19th and 20th centuries.

Rapid growth in coffee production in South America during the second half of the 19th century was matched by an increase in consumption in developed countries. Nowhere was this growth been as pronounced as in the United States, where a high rate of population growth was compounded by doubling of per capita consumption between 1860 and 1920. Though the United States was not the heaviest coffee-drinking nation at the time (Belgium, the Netherlands and Nordic countries all had comparable or higher levels of per capita consumption), due to its sheer size, the US was already the largest consumer of coffee in the world by 1860. By 1920, around half of all coffee produced worldwide was consumed in the US.

Coffee has become a vital cash crop for many developing countries. Over 100 million people in developing countries have become dependent on coffee as their primary source of income. It has become the primary export and economic backbone for African countries like Uganda, Burundi, Rwanda, and Ethiopia, as well as many Central American countries.

Coffee bean production, 2023

== Biology ==
Several species of shrub of the genus Coffea produce the berries from which coffee is extracted. The two main species commercially cultivated are C. canephora (predominantly a form known as 'robusta') and C. arabica. C. arabica, the most highly regarded species, is native to the southwestern highlands of Ethiopia, the Boma Plateau in southeastern Sudan, and Mount Marsabit in northern Kenya. C. canephora is native to western and central Subsaharan Africa, from Guinea to Uganda and southern Sudan. Less popular species are C. liberica, C. stenophylla, C. mauritiana, and C. racemosa.

All coffee plants are classified in the family Rubiaceae. They are evergreen shrubs or trees that may grow 5 m (15 ft) tall when unpruned. The leaves are dark green and glossy, usually 10–15 cm (4–6 in) long and 6 cm (2.4 in) wide, simple, entire, and opposite. Petioles of opposite leaves fuse at the base to form interpetiolar stipules, characteristic of Rubiaceae. The flowers are axillary, and clusters of fragrant white flowers bloom simultaneously. Gynoecium consists of an inferior ovary, also characteristic of Rubiaceae. The flowers are followed by oval berries of about 1.5 cm (0.6 in). When immature, they are green, and they ripen to yellow, then crimson, before turning black on drying. Each berry usually contains two seeds, but 5–10% of the berries have only one; these are called peaberries. Arabica berries ripen in six to eight months, while robusta takes nine to eleven months.

C. arabica is predominantly self-pollinating, and as a result the seedlings are generally uniform and vary little from their parents. In contrast, C. canephora and C. liberica are self-incompatible and require outcrossing. This means that useful forms and hybrids must be propagated vegetatively. Cuttings, grafting, and budding are the usual methods of vegetative propagation. On the other hand, there is great scope for experimentation in search of potential new strains.

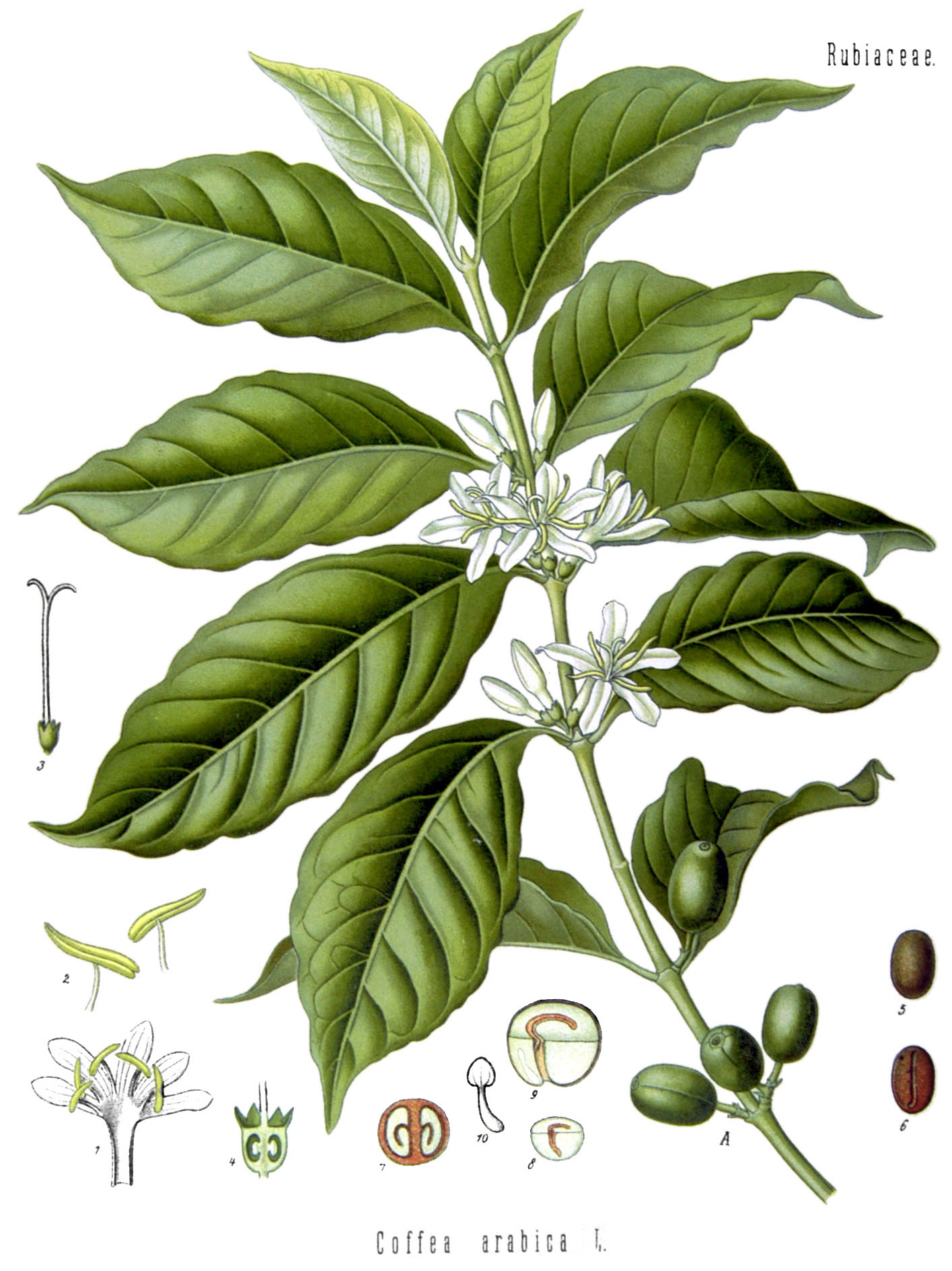
Illustration of C. arabica plant and seeds

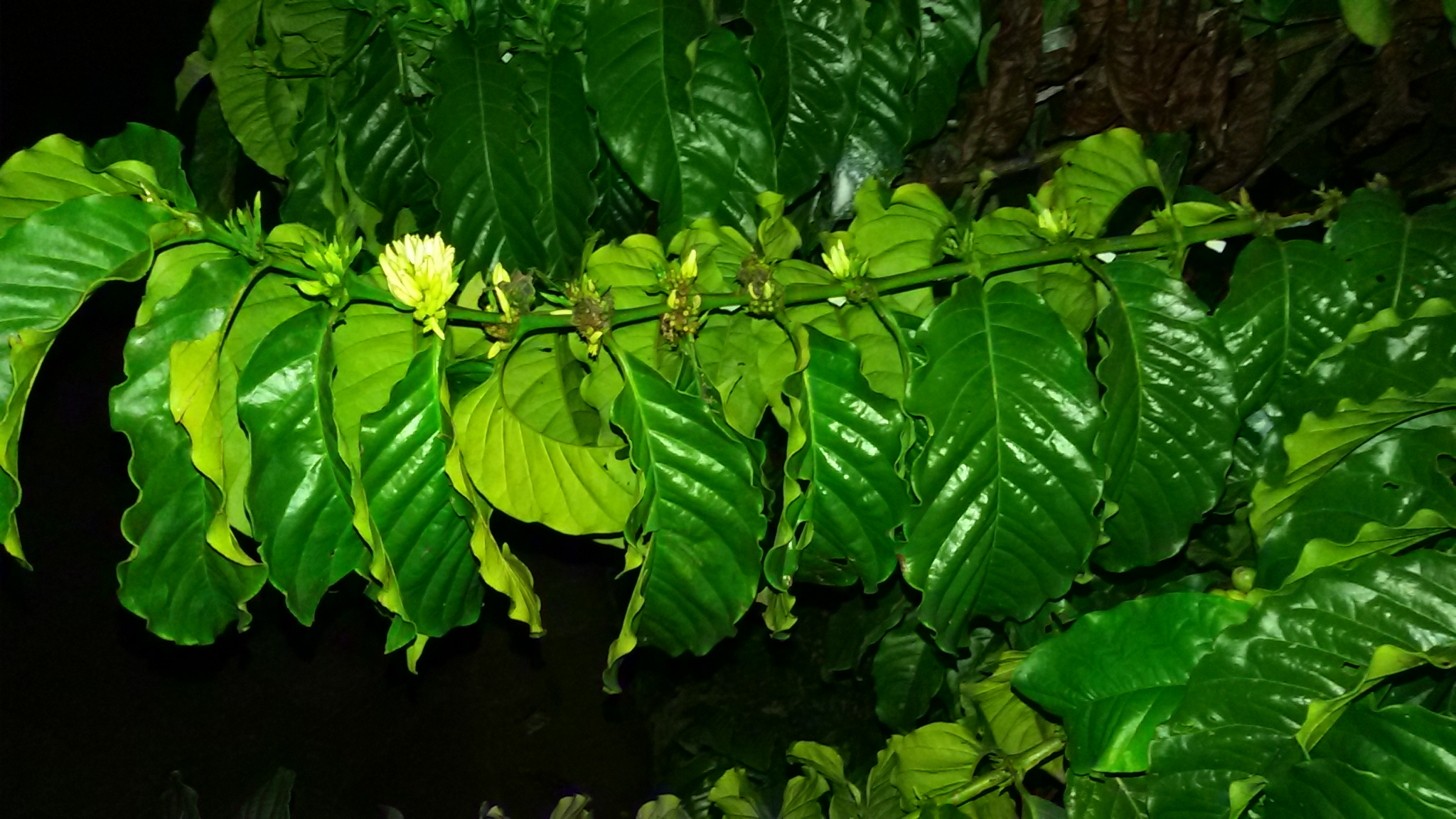
C. robusta flowers

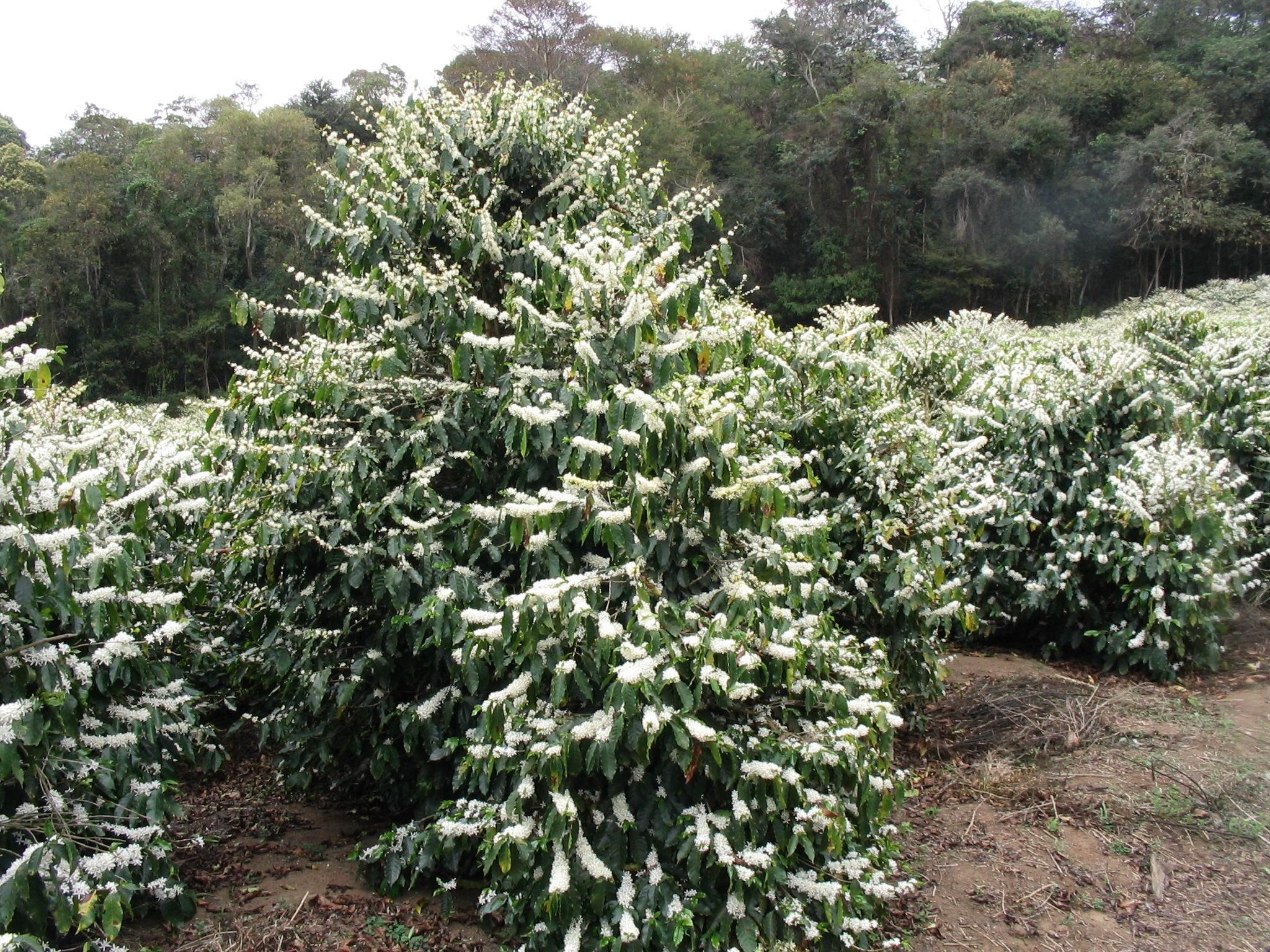
A flowering C. arabica tree

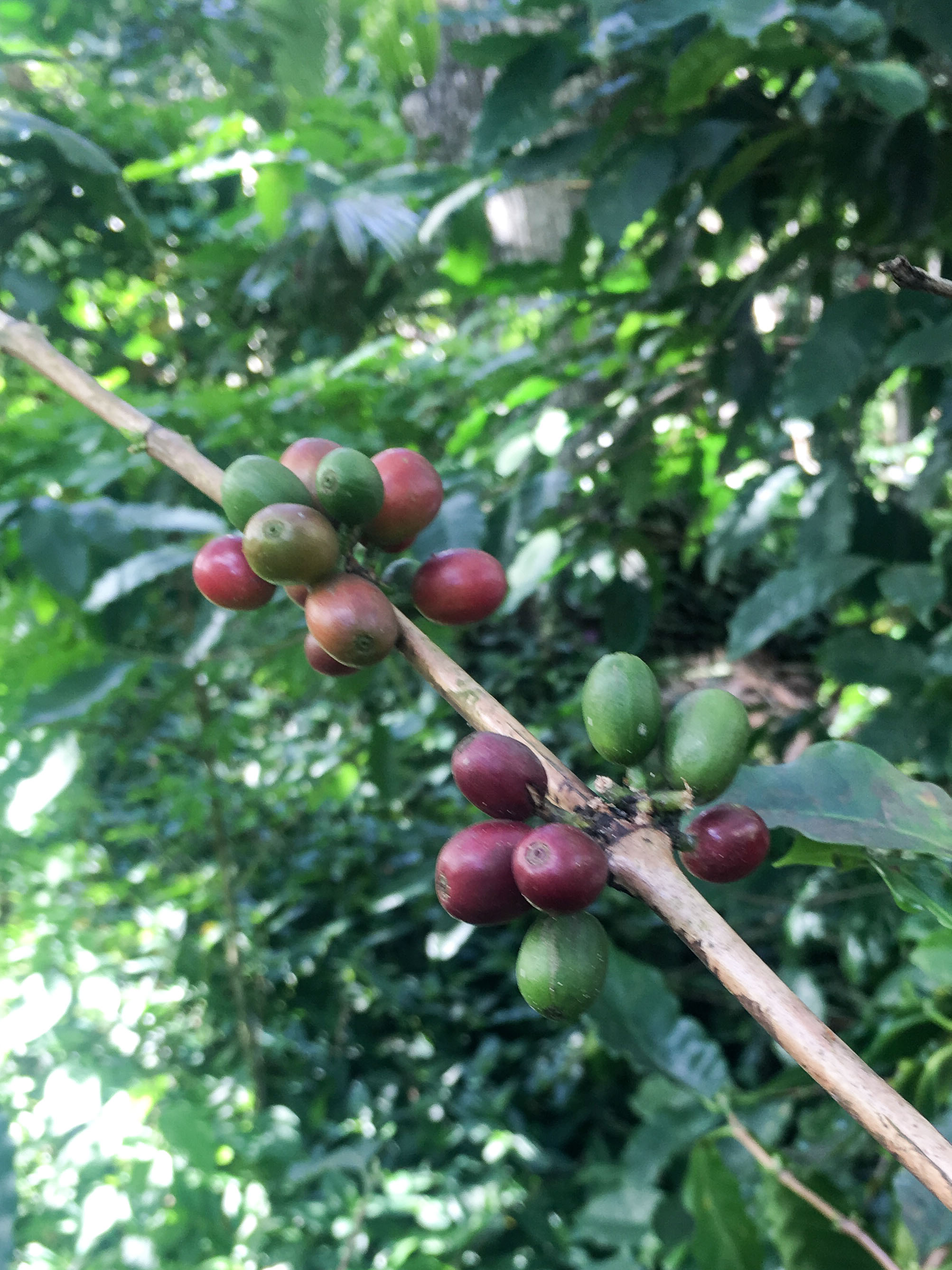
C. arabica berries on the bush

== Cultivation and production ==
A map of global coffee cultivation: r Coffea canephora m Coffea canephora and Coffea arabica a Coffea arabica

The traditional method of planting coffee is to place 20 seeds in each hole at the beginning of the rainy season. This method loses about 50% of the seeds' potential, as about half fail to sprout. A more effective process of growing coffee, used in Brazil, is to raise seedlings in nurseries that are then planted outside after six to twelve months. Coffee is often intercropped with food crops, such as corn, beans, or rice during the first few years of cultivation as farmers become familiar with its requirements. Coffee plants grow within a defined area between the tropics of Cancer and Capricorn, termed the bean belt or coffee belt.

In 2020, the world production of green coffee beans was 175,647,000 60 kg bags, led by Brazil with 39% of the total, followed by Vietnam, Colombia, and Indonesia. Brazil is the largest coffee exporting nation, accounting for 15% of all world exports in 2019. As of 2021, no synthetic coffee products are publicly available but multiple bioeconomy companies have reportedly produced first batches that are highly similar on the molecular level and are close to commercialization.

=== Species variations ===
Of the two main species grown, arabica coffee (from C. arabica) is generally more highly regarded than robusta coffee (from C. canephora). Robusta coffee tends to be bitter and has less flavor but a better body than arabica. For these reasons, about three-quarters of the coffee cultivated worldwide is C. arabica. Robusta strains contain about 40–50% more caffeine than arabica. Consequently, this species is used as an inexpensive substitute for arabica in many commercial coffee blends. Good quality robusta beans are used in traditional Italian espresso blends to provide a full-bodied taste and a better foam head (known as crema).

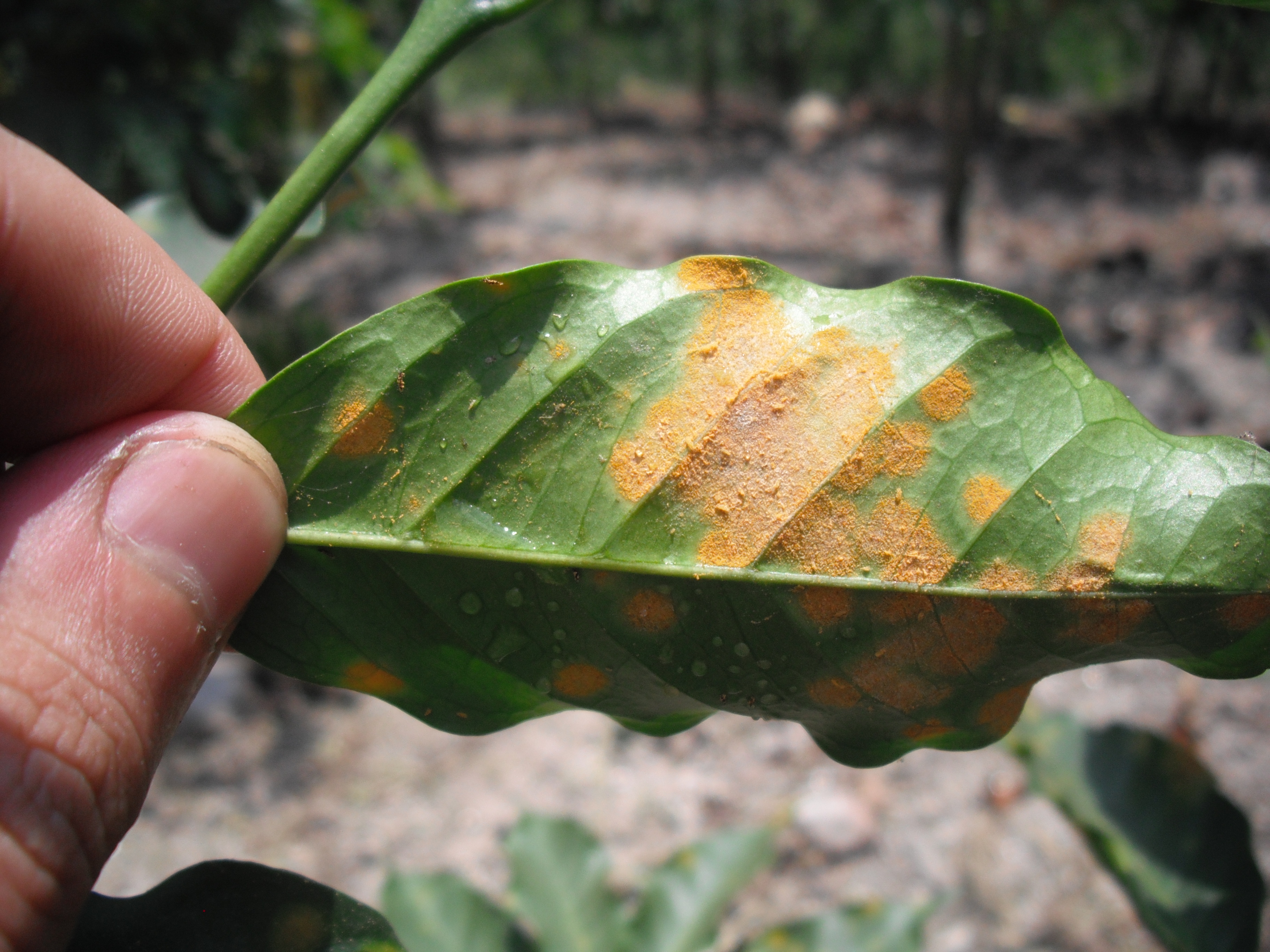
Coffee leaf rust has forced the cultivation of resistant robusta coffee in many countries.

Robusta is less susceptible to disease than arabica and can be cultivated in lower altitudes and warmer climates where arabica does not thrive. The robusta strain was first collected in 1890 from the Lomani River, a tributary of the Congo River, and was conveyed from the Congo Free State (now the Democratic Republic of the Congo) to Brussels to Java around 1900. From Java, further breeding resulted in the establishment of robusta plantations in many countries. In particular, the spread of the devastating coffee leaf rust, caused by the fungal pathogen Hemileia vastatrix, hastened the uptake of the resistant robusta. The pathogen results in light, rust-colored spots on the undersides of coffee plant leaves. It grows exclusively on the leaves of coffee plants. Coffee leaf rust is found in virtually all countries that produce coffee.

Beans from different countries or regions can usually be distinguished by differences in flavor, aroma, body, and acidity. These taste characteristics are dependent on the coffee's growing region, genetic subspecies (varietals), and processing. Varietals are generally known by the region in which they are grown, such as Colombian, Java, and Kona. Arabica coffee beans are cultivated mainly in Latin America, eastern Africa or Asia, while robusta beans are grown in central Africa, southeast Asia, and Brazil.

=== Pests and treatments ===
==== Fungi ====
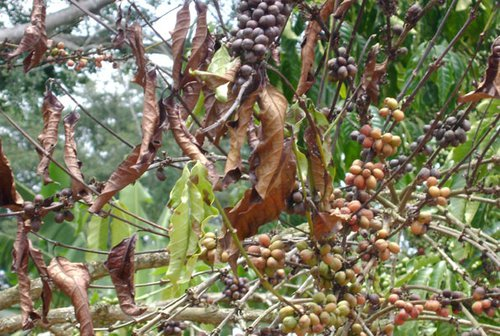
A Robusta coffee tree infected by coffee wilt disease

Coffee wilt disease or tracheomycosis is a common vascular wilt found in Eastern and Central Africa that can kill coffee trees it infects. It is induced by the fungal pathogen Gibberella xylarioides. It can affect several Coffea species and could potentially threaten production worldwide. Mycena citricolor, American leaf spot, is a fungus that can affect the entire coffee plant. It grows on leaves, resulting in leaves with holes that often fall from the plant. It is a threat primarily in Latin America.

==== Animals ====
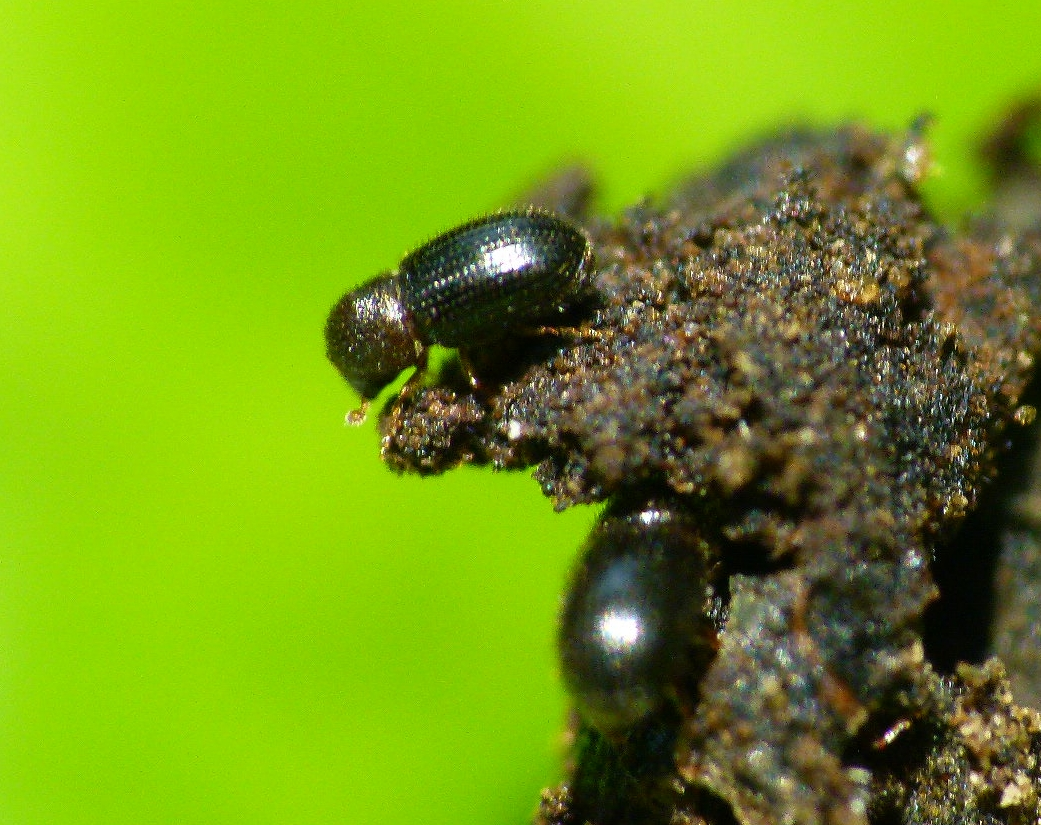
The coffee borer beetle is a major insect pest of the world's coffee industry.

Over 900 species of insect have been recorded as pests of coffee crops worldwide. Of these, over a third are beetles, and over a quarter are bugs. Some 20 species of nematodes, 9 species of mites, and several snails and slugs also attack the crop. Birds and rodents sometimes eat coffee berries, but their impact is minor compared to invertebrates. In general, C. arabica is the more sensitive species to invertebrate predation overall. Each part of the coffee plant is assailed by different animals. Nematodes attack the roots, coffee borer beetles burrow into stems and woody material, and the foliage is attacked by over 100 species of larvae of butterflies and moths.

Mass spraying of insecticides has often proven disastrous, as predators of the pests are more sensitive than the pests themselves. Instead, integrated pest management has been developed, using techniques such as targeted treatment of pest outbreaks and managing crop environment away from conditions favoring pests. Branches infested with scale are often cut and left on the ground, which causes scale parasites to attack the scale on the fallen branches as well as in the plant.

The 2-mm-long coffee borer beetle (Hypothenemus hampei) is the most damaging insect pest of the world's coffee industry, destroying up to 50 percent or more of the coffee berries on plantations in most coffee-producing countries. The adult female beetle nibbles a single tiny hole in a coffee berry and lays 35 to 50 eggs. Inside, the offspring grow, mate, and then emerge from the commercially ruined berry to disperse, repeating the cycle. Pesticides are mostly ineffective because the beetle juveniles are protected inside the berry nurseries, but they are vulnerable to predation by birds when they emerge. When groves of trees are nearby, the American yellow warbler, rufous-capped warbler, and other insectivorous birds have been shown to reduce by 50 percent the number of coffee berry borers in Costa Rica coffee plantations.

=== Ecological effects ===
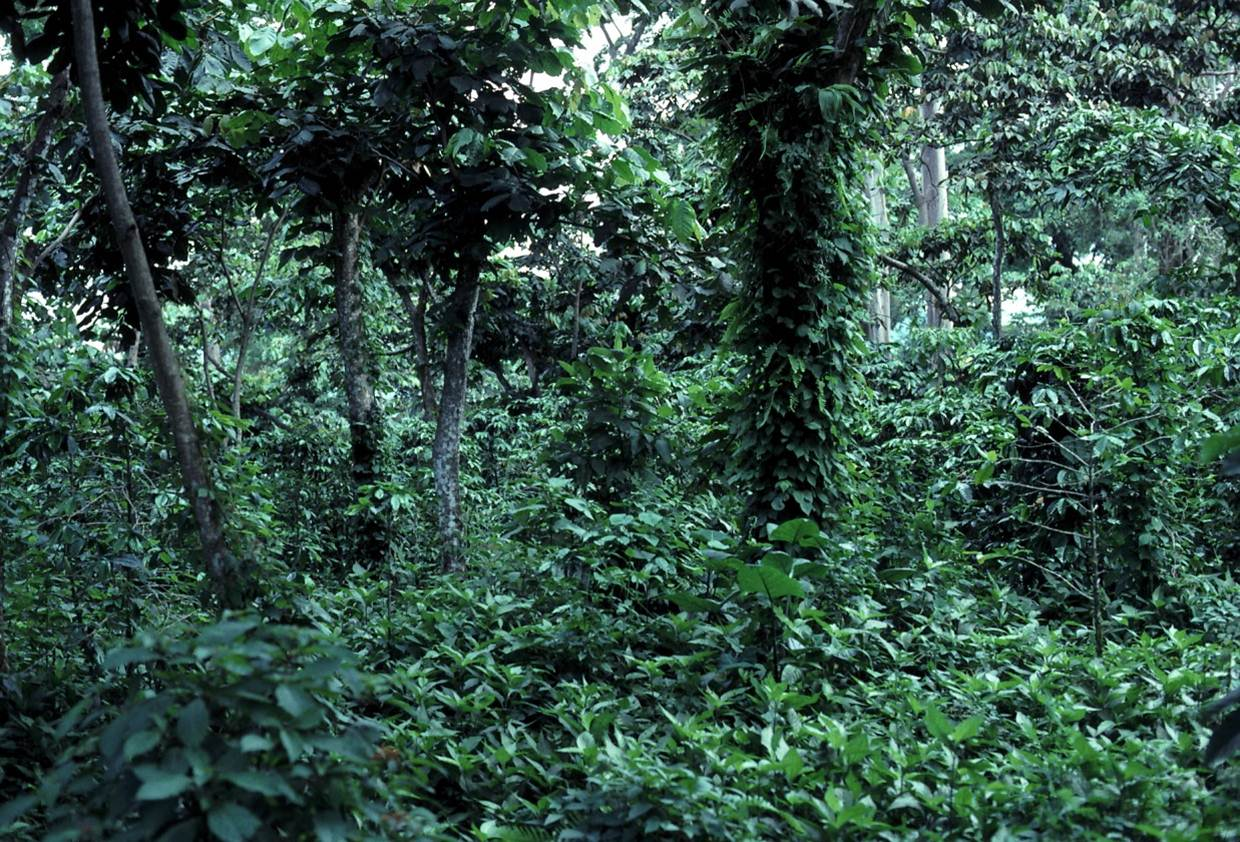
Shade-grown coffee in Guatemala

Originally, coffee was grown in the shade of trees that provided a habitat for many animals and insects. Remnant forest trees were used for this purpose, but many species have been planted as well. These include leguminous trees of the genera Acacia, Albizia, Cassia, Erythrina, Gliricidia, Inga, and Leucaena, as well as the nitrogen-fixing non-legume sheoaks of the genus Casuarina, and the silky oak Grevillea robusta. This method is commonly called "shade-grown coffee". Starting in the 1970s, many farmers switched their production methods to sun cultivation, in which coffee is grown in rows under full sun with little or no forest canopy. This causes berries to ripen more rapidly and bushes to produce higher yields, but the method requires the clearing of trees and increased use of fertilizer and pesticides, which damage the environment and cause health problems. Unshaded coffee plants grown with fertilizer yield the most coffee, although unfertilized shaded crops generally yield more than unfertilized unshaded crops: the response to fertilizer is much greater in full sun. While traditional coffee production causes berries to ripen more slowly and produce lower yields, the quality of the coffee is allegedly superior. According to The International Coffee Organization factors such as drought, unfavourable temperature and climate change greatly affect coffee quality. In addition, the traditional shaded method provides living space for many wildlife species. Proponents of shade cultivation say environmental problems such as deforestation, pesticide pollution, habitat destruction, and soil and water degradation are the side effects of the practices employed in sun cultivation. The American Birding Association, Smithsonian Migratory Bird Center, National Arbor Day Foundation, and the Rainforest Alliance have led a campaign for 'shade-grown' and organic coffees, which can be sustainably harvested. Shaded coffee cultivation systems show greater biodiversity than full-sun systems, and those more distant from continuous forest compare rather poorly to undisturbed native forest in terms of habitat value for some bird species.

Coffee production uses a large volume of water. On average it takes about 140 liters (37 U.S. gal) of water to grow the coffee beans needed to produce one cup of coffee. Growing the plants needed to produce 1 kg (2.2 lb) of roasted coffee in Africa, South America or Asia requires 26,400 liters (7,000 U.S. gal) of water. As with many other forms of agriculture, often much of this is rainwater, much of which would otherwise run off into rivers or coastlines, while much water actually absorbed by the plants is transpired back into the local environment through the plants' leaves (especially for cooling effects); broad estimates aside, consequential margins vary considerably based on details of local geography and horticultural practice. Coffee is often grown in countries where there is a water shortage, such as Ethiopia.

Used coffee grounds may be used for composting or as a mulch. They are especially appreciated by worms and acid-loving plants such as blueberries. Climate change may significantly impact coffee yields during the 21st century, such as in Nicaragua and Ethiopia which could lose more than half of the farming land suitable for growing (Arabica) coffee. As of 2016, at least 34% of global coffee production was compliant with voluntary sustainability standards such as Fairtrade, UTZ, and 4C (The Common Code for the Coffee Community).

=== Preprocessing ===
Coffee berries are traditionally selectively picked by hand, which is labor-intensive as it involves the selection of only the berries at the peak of ripeness. More commonly, crops are strip picked, where all berries are harvested simultaneously regardless of ripeness by person or machine. After picking, green coffee is processed by one of two types of method—a dry process method which is often simpler and less labor-intensive, and a wet process method, which incorporates batch fermentation, uses larger amounts of water in the process, and often yields a milder coffee.

Then they are sorted by ripeness and color, and most often the flesh of the berry is removed, usually by machine, and the seeds are fermented to remove the slimy layer of mucilage still present on the seed. When the fermentation is finished, the seeds are washed with large quantities of fresh water to remove the fermentation residue, which generates massive amounts of coffee wastewater. Finally, the seeds are dried.

Using drying tables produces the most uniform effect with less fermentation. In this method, the pulped and fermented coffee is spread thinly on raised beds, which allows the air to pass on all sides of the coffee, and then the coffee is mixed by hand. It is not done very often; most African coffee is dried in this manner, and in the early 20th century a few coffee farms around the world were starting to use this method. Next, the coffee is sorted, and labeled as green coffee. Some companies use cylinders to pump in heated air to dry the coffee seeds, though this is generally in places where the humidity is very high.

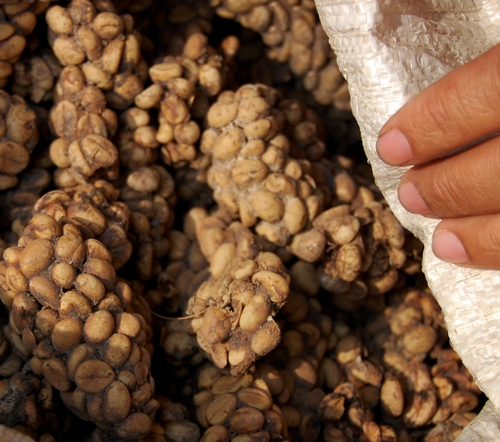
Kopi luwak, coffee berries that have been preprocessed by passing through the Asian palm civet's digestive tract

An Asian coffee known as kopi luwak undergoes a peculiar process made from coffee berries eaten by the Asian palm civet, passing through its digestive tract, with the beans harvested from feces. Coffee brewed from this process is among the most expensive in the world, with bean prices reaching $160 per pound or $30 per brewed cup. Kopi luwak coffee is said to have a uniquely rich, slightly smoky aroma and flavor with hints of chocolate, resulting from the action of digestive enzymes breaking down bean proteins to facilitate partial fermentation. In Thailand, black ivory coffee beans are fed to elephants whose digestive enzymes reduce the bitter taste of beans collected from dung. These beans sell for up to $1,100 a kilogram ($500 per lb), achieving the world's most expensive coffee, three times costlier than palm civet coffee beans.

== Processing ==
=== Roasting ===
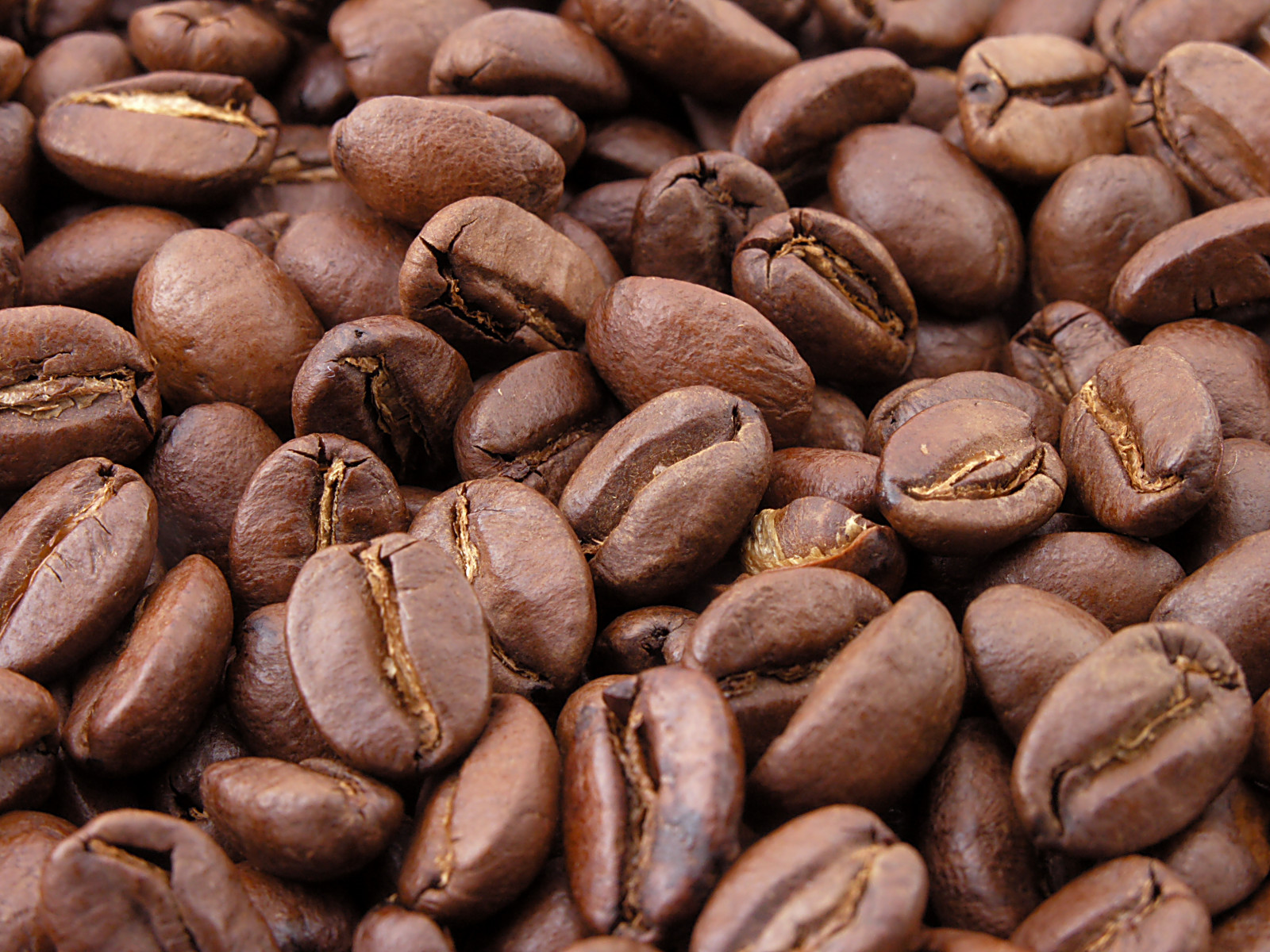
Roasted coffee beans

The next step in the process is the roasting of the green coffee. Coffee is usually sold in a roasted state, and with rare exceptions, such as infusions from green coffee beans, coffee is roasted before it is consumed. It can be sold roasted by the supplier, or it can be home roasted. The roasting process influences the taste by changing the coffee bean physically and chemically. The bean decreases in weight as moisture is lost and increases in volume, causing it to become less dense. The density of the bean also influences the strength of the coffee and the requirements for packaging.

The actual roasting begins when the temperature inside the bean reaches approximately 200 °C (392 °F), though different varieties of seeds differ in moisture and density and therefore roast at different rates. During roasting, caramelization occurs as intense heat breaks down starches, changing them to simple sugars that begin to brown, which darkens the color of the bean.

Sucrose is rapidly lost during the roasting process and may disappear entirely in darker roasts. During roasting, aromatic oils and acids weaken, changing the flavor; at 205 °C (401 °F), other oils start to develop. One of these oils, caffeol, is created at about 200 °C (392 °F), and is largely responsible for coffee's aroma and flavor. The difference in caffeine content between a light roast and a dark roast is only about 0.1%.

=== Grading roasted beans ===
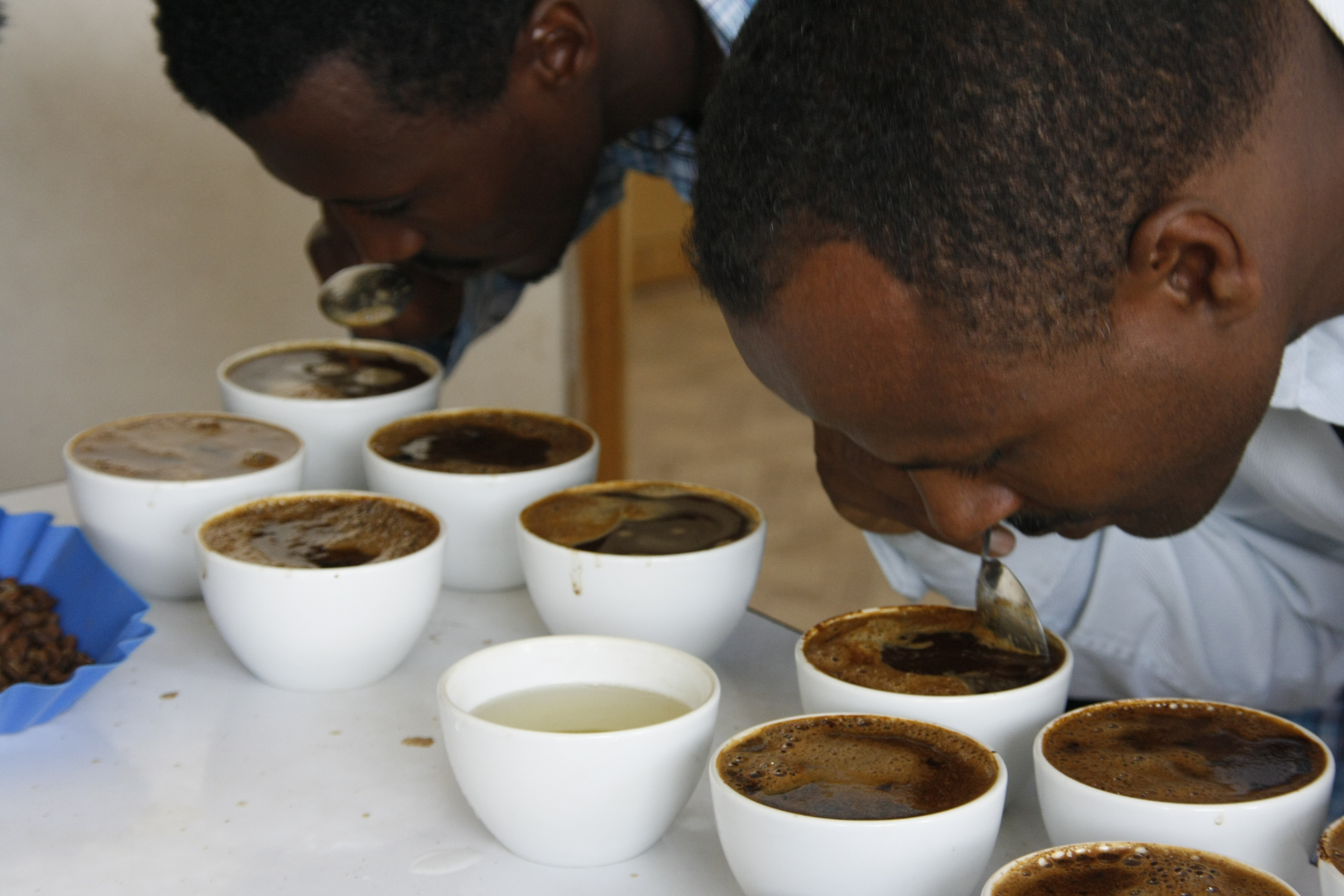
Coffee "cuppers", or professional tasters, grade coffee.

Depending on the color of the roasted beans as perceived by the human eye, they will be labeled as light, medium light, medium, medium dark, dark, or very dark. Typical terms used commercially, from the lightest to the darkest, are light, medium, sometimes medium-dark, full, espresso, and high (or dark).A more accurate method of discerning the degree of roast involves measuring the reflected light from roasted seeds illuminated with a light source in the near-infrared spectrum. This elaborate light meter uses a process known as spectroscopy to return a number that consistently indicates the roasted coffee's relative degree of roast or flavor development. Coffee has, in many countries, been graded by size longer than it has been graded by quality. Grading is generally done with sieves, numbered to indicate the size of the perforations.

=== Roast characteristics ===
The degree of roast affects coffee flavor and body. The color of the coffee after brewing is also affected by the degree of roasting. Darker roasts are generally bolder because they have less fiber content and a more sugary flavor. Lighter roasts have a more complex and therefore perceived stronger flavor from aromatic oils and acids otherwise destroyed by longer roasting times. Roasting does not alter the amount of caffeine in the bean but does give less caffeine when the beans are measured by volume because the beans expand during roasting. A small amount of chaff is produced during roasting from the skin left on the seed after processing; is usually removed from the seeds by air movement, though a small amount is added to dark roast coffees to soak up oils on the seeds.

=== Decaffeination ===
Decaffeination of coffee seeds is done while the seeds are still green. Many methods can remove caffeine from coffee, but all involve either soaking the green seeds in hot water (often called the "Swiss water process") or steaming them, then using a solvent to dissolve the caffeine-containing oils. Decaffeination is often done by processing companies, and the extracted caffeine is usually sold to the pharmaceutical industry.

=== Storage ===
Coffee is best stored in an airtight container made of ceramic, glass or non-reactive metal. Higher quality prepackaged coffee usually has a one-way valve that prevents air from entering while allowing the coffee to release gases. Coffee freshness and flavor is preserved when it is stored away from moisture, heat, and light. The tendency of coffee to absorb strong smells from food means that it should be kept away from such smells. Storage of coffee in refrigerators is not recommended due to the presence of moisture which can cause deterioration. Exterior walls of buildings that face the sun may heat the interior of a home, and this heat may damage coffee stored near such a wall. Heat from nearby ovens also harms stored coffee.

In 1931, a method of packing coffee in a sealed vacuum in cans was introduced. The roasted coffee was packed and then 99% of the air was removed, allowing the coffee to be stored indefinitely until the can was opened. Today this method is widely used.

== Preparation ==
=== Brewing ===
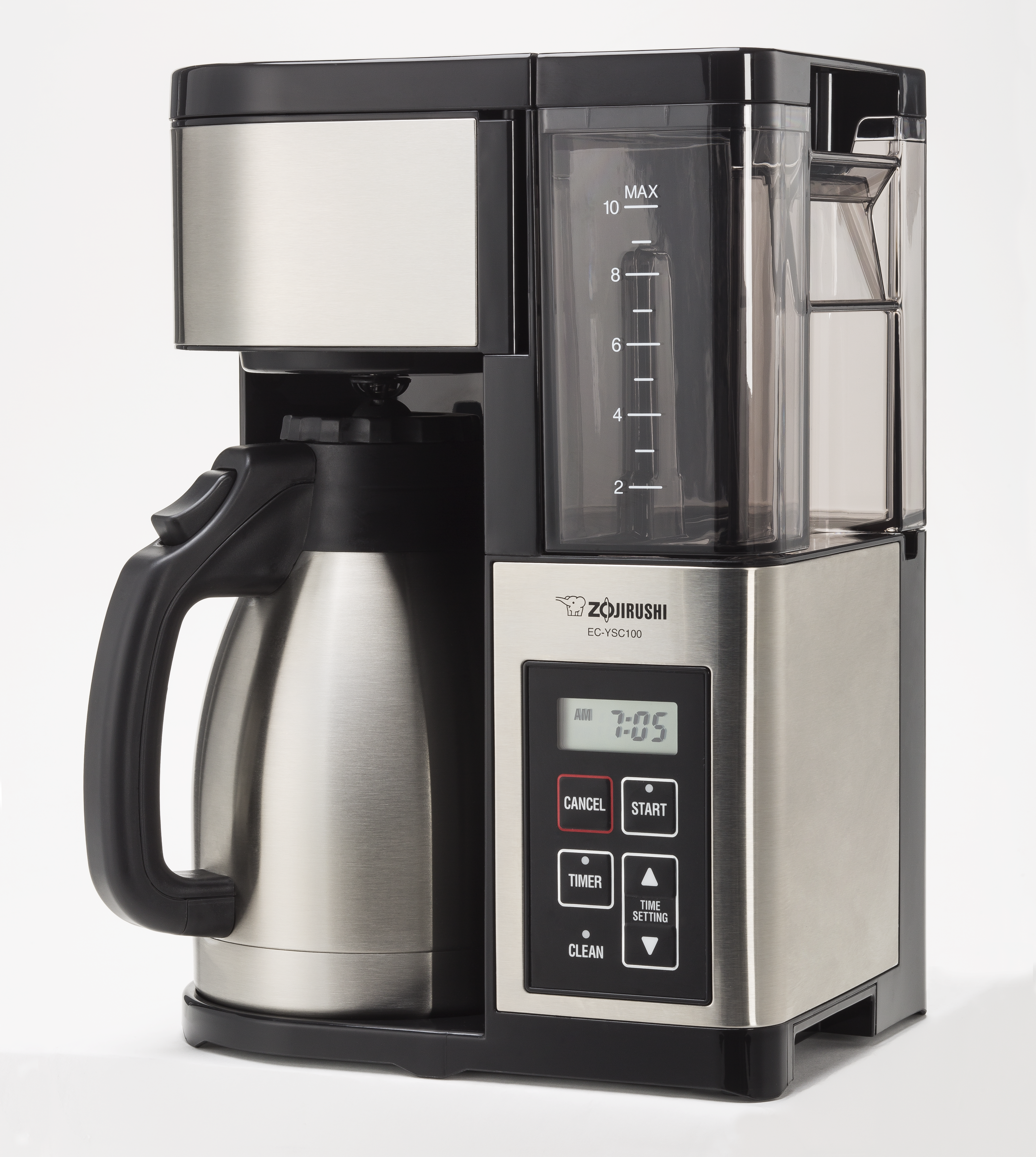
A contemporary electric automatic drip-coffee maker

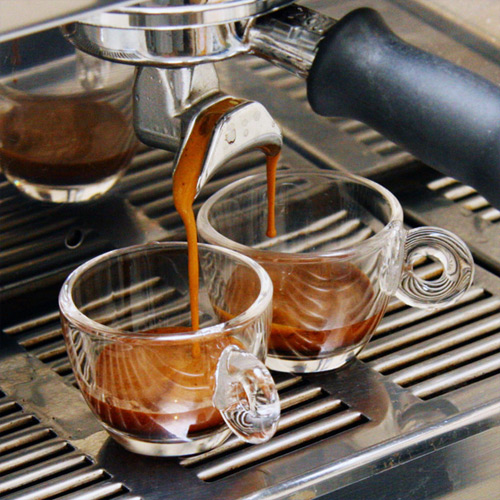
Espresso is one of the most popular coffee-brewing methods. The term espresso, substituting s for most x letters in Latin-root words, with the term deriving from the past participle of the Italian verb esprimere, itself derived from the Latin exprimere, means 'to express', and refers to the process by which hot water is forced under pressure through ground coffee.

Coffee beans must be ground and brewed to create a beverage. The criteria for choosing a method include flavor and economy. Almost all methods of preparing coffee require that the beans be ground and then mixed with hot water long enough to allow the flavor to emerge but not so long as to draw out bitter compounds. The liquid can be consumed after the spent grounds are removed. Brewing considerations include the fineness of the grind, how the water is used to extract the flavor, the ratio of coffee grounds to water (the brew ratio), additional flavorings such as sugar, milk, and spices, and the technique to be used to separate spent grounds. Optimal coffee extraction occurs between 91 and 96 °C (196 and 205 °F). Ideal holding temperatures range from 85 to 88 °C (185 to 190 °F) to as high as 93 °C (199 °F), and the ideal serving temperature is 68 to 79 °C (154 to 174 °F).

Coffee beans may be ground with a burr grinder, which uses revolving elements to shear the seed; a blade grinder cuts the seeds with blades moving at high speed; or a mortar and pestle crushes the seeds. For most brewing methods a burr grinder is deemed superior because the grind is more even, and the grind size can be adjusted. The type of grind is often named after the brewing method for which it is generally used, Turkish grind being the finest, while coffee percolator or French press are the coarsest. The most common grinds are between these extremes: a medium grind is used in most home coffee-brewing machines.

Coffee may be brewed by several methods. It may be boiled, steeped, or pressurized. Brewing coffee by boiling is the earliest method, and Turkish coffee is an example of this method. It is prepared by grinding or pounding the seeds to a fine powder, then adding it to water and bringing it to a boil very briefly in a pot called a cezve or, in Greek, a μπρίκι: bríki (from Turkish ibrik). This produces a strong coffee with a layer of foam on the surface and sediment (which is not meant for drinking) settling at the bottom of the cup.

Drip brewers and automatic coffeemakers brew coffee using gravity. In an automatic coffeemaker, hot water drips onto coffee grounds that are held in a paper, plastic, or perforated metal coffee filter, allowing the water to seep through the ground coffee while extracting its oils and essences. The liquid drips through the coffee and the filter into a carafe or pot, and the spent coffee grounds are retained in the filter.

In a coffee percolator, water is pulled under a pipe by gravity, which is then forced into a chamber above a filter by steam pressure created by boiling. The water then seeps through the grounds, and the process is repeated until terminated by removing it from the heat, by an internal timer, or by a thermostat that turns off the heater when the entire pot reaches a certain temperature.

The espresso method forces hot pressurized water through finely-ground coffee. As a result of brewing under high pressure (typically 9 bar), the espresso beverage is more concentrated (as much as 10 to 15 times the quantity of coffee to water as gravity-brewing methods can produce) and has a more complex physical and chemical constitution. A well-prepared espresso has a reddish-brown foam called crema that floats on the surface. Other pressurized water methods include the moka pot and vacuum coffee maker. The AeroPress also works similarly, moving a column of water through a bed of coffee.

Cold brew coffee is made by steeping coarsely-ground beans in cold water for several hours, then filtering them. This results in a brew lower in acidity than most hot-brewing methods.

=== Serving ===
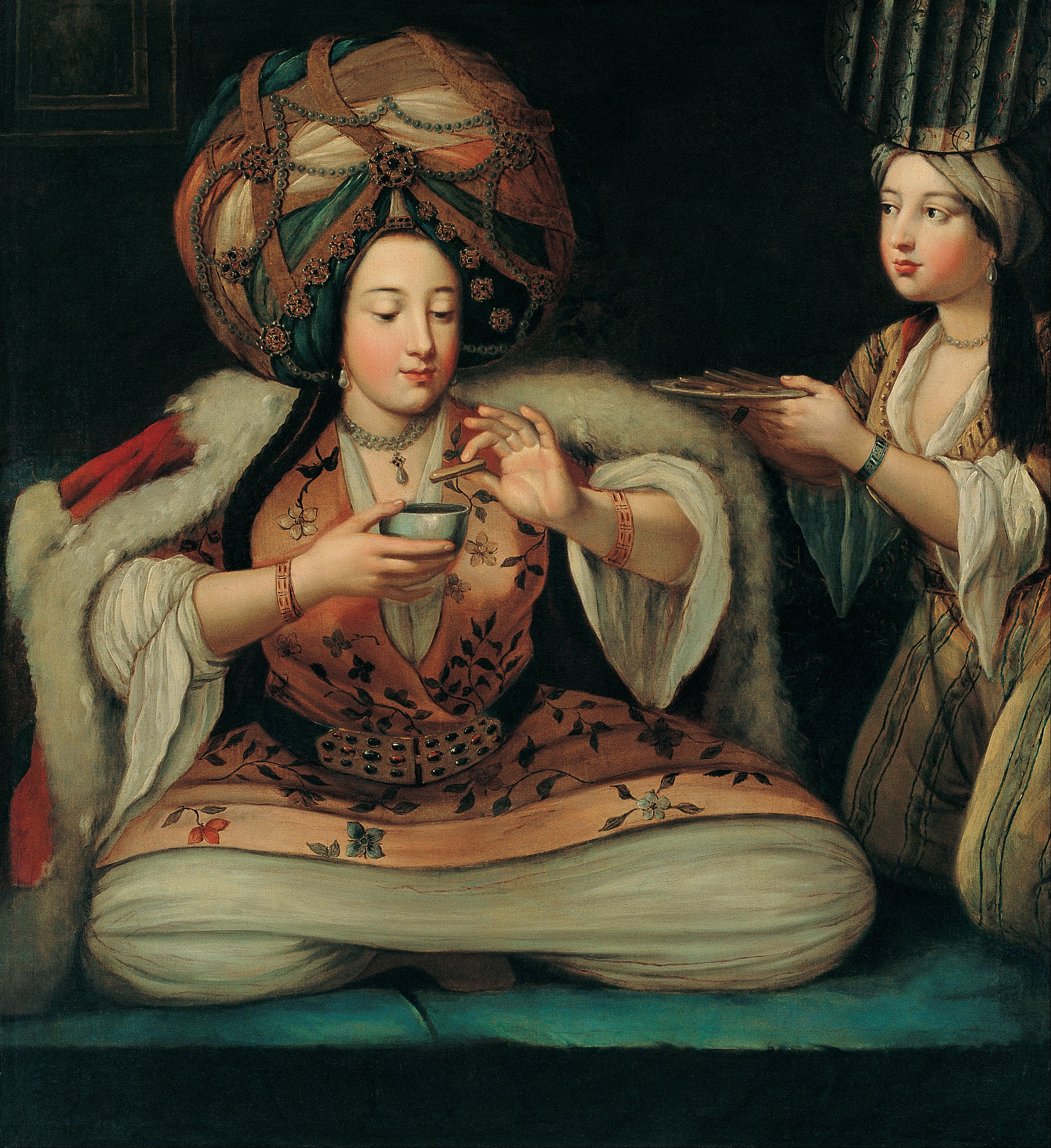
Enjoying coffee in Ottoman Empire. Painting by unknown artist in the Pera Museum.

Once brewed, coffee may be served in a variety of ways. Drip-brewed, percolated, or French-pressed/cafetière coffee may be served as white coffee with a dairy product such as milk or cream, or dairy substitute, or as black coffee with no such addition. It may be sweetened with sugar or artificial sweetener. When served cold, it is called iced coffee. Popular iced coffee options include frappés, iced lattes, or stronger brewed coffee served with ice.

Espresso-based coffee has a variety of possible presentations. In its most basic form, an espresso is served alone as a shot or short black, or with hot water added, when it is known as caffè americano. A long black is made by pouring a double espresso into an equal portion of water, retaining the crema, unlike caffè americano. Milk is added in various forms to an espresso: steamed milk makes a caffè latte, equal parts steamed milk and milk froth make a cappuccino, and a dollop of hot foamed milk on top creates a caffè macchiato. A flat white is prepared by adding steamed hot milk (microfoam) to two espresso shots; it has less milk than a latte, but both are varieties of coffee to which the milk can be added in such a way as to create a decorative surface pattern. Such effects are known as latte art.

Coffee can be incorporated with alcohol to produce a variety of beverages: it is combined with whiskey in Irish coffee, and it forms the base of alcoholic coffee liqueurs such as Kahlúa and Tia Maria. Some craft beers have coffee or coffee extracts added to the beer, although porter and stout beers may have a coffee-like taste solely due to roasted grains.

==== "Functional coffee" ====
Coffee can also be blended with ingredients claimed to improve health in a form described as a "functional coffee" drink. Additions used include mushrooms, of which some of the most frequently used include lion's mane, chaga, Cordyceps, and reishi. Mushroom coffee has about half the caffeine of standard coffee. However, drinking mushroom coffee can result in digestive issues, and high amounts of powdered reishi mushroom can result in liver toxicity. There is little clinical evidence for the benefits of mushroom coffee.

"Functional" additions also include protein powder, collagen, and ashwagandha.

==== Instant coffee ====
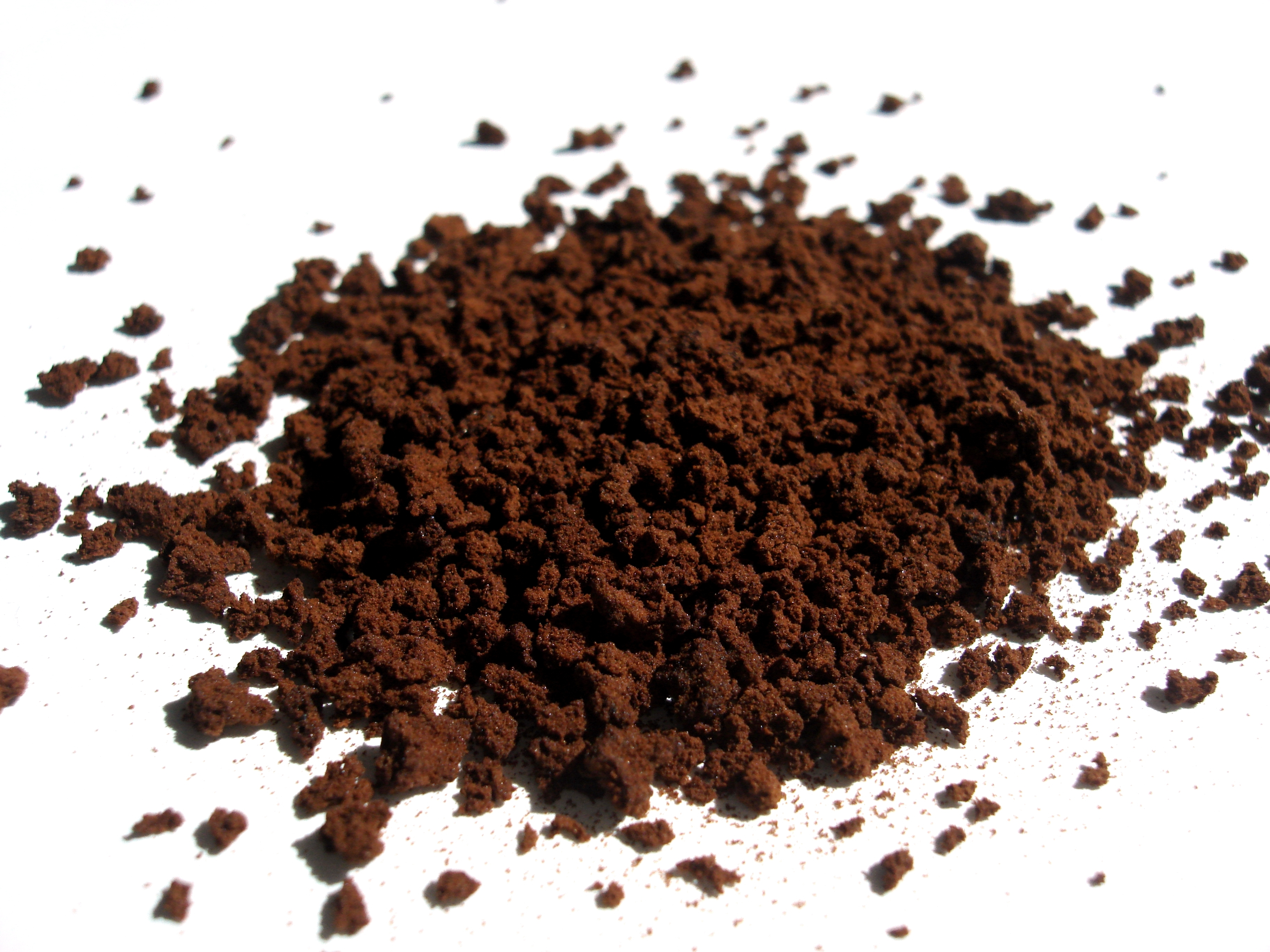
Instant coffee

Many products are sold for the convenience of consumers who do not want to prepare their coffee or who do not have access to coffeemaking equipment. Instant coffee is dried into soluble powder or freeze-dried into granules that can be quickly dissolved in hot water. A New Zealand invention and staple, instant coffee was originally invented in Invercargill in 1890 by food chemist David Strang. It rapidly gained in popularity in many countries in the post-war period, with Nescafé being the most popular product. Many consumers determined that the convenience of preparing a cup of instant coffee more than made up for a perceived inferior taste, although, since the late 1970s, instant coffee has been produced differently in such a way that is similar to the taste of freshly brewed coffee. Paralleling (and complementing) the rapid rise of instant coffee was the coffee vending machine invented in 1947 and widely distributed since the 1950s.

== Economics ==
Green coffee production 2023, millions of tonnes
Brazil	3.41
Vietnam	1.96
Indonesia	0.76
Colombia	0.68
Ethiopia	0.56
World	11.06
Source: FAOSTAT of the United Nations

=== World production ===
In 2023, world production of green coffee beans was 11 million tonnes, led by Brazil with 31% of the total and Vietnam as a secondary producer (table).

=== Commodity market ===
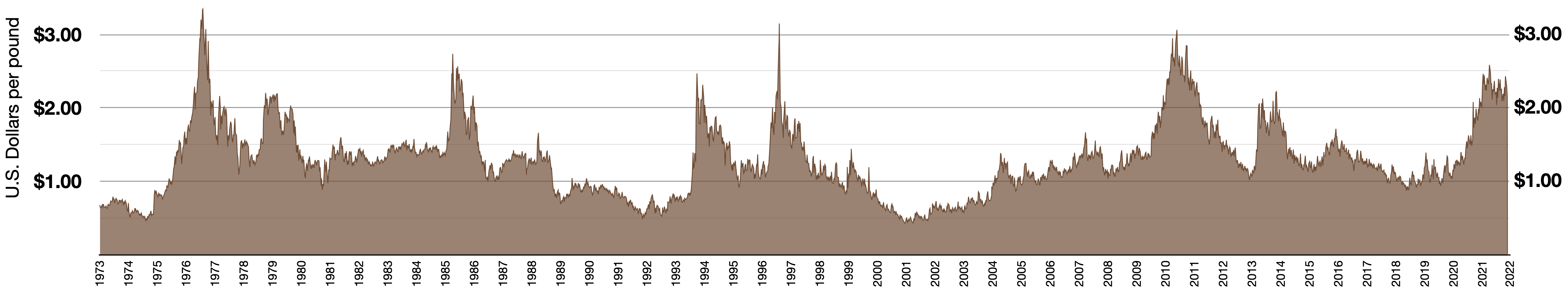
Coffee prices 1973–2022

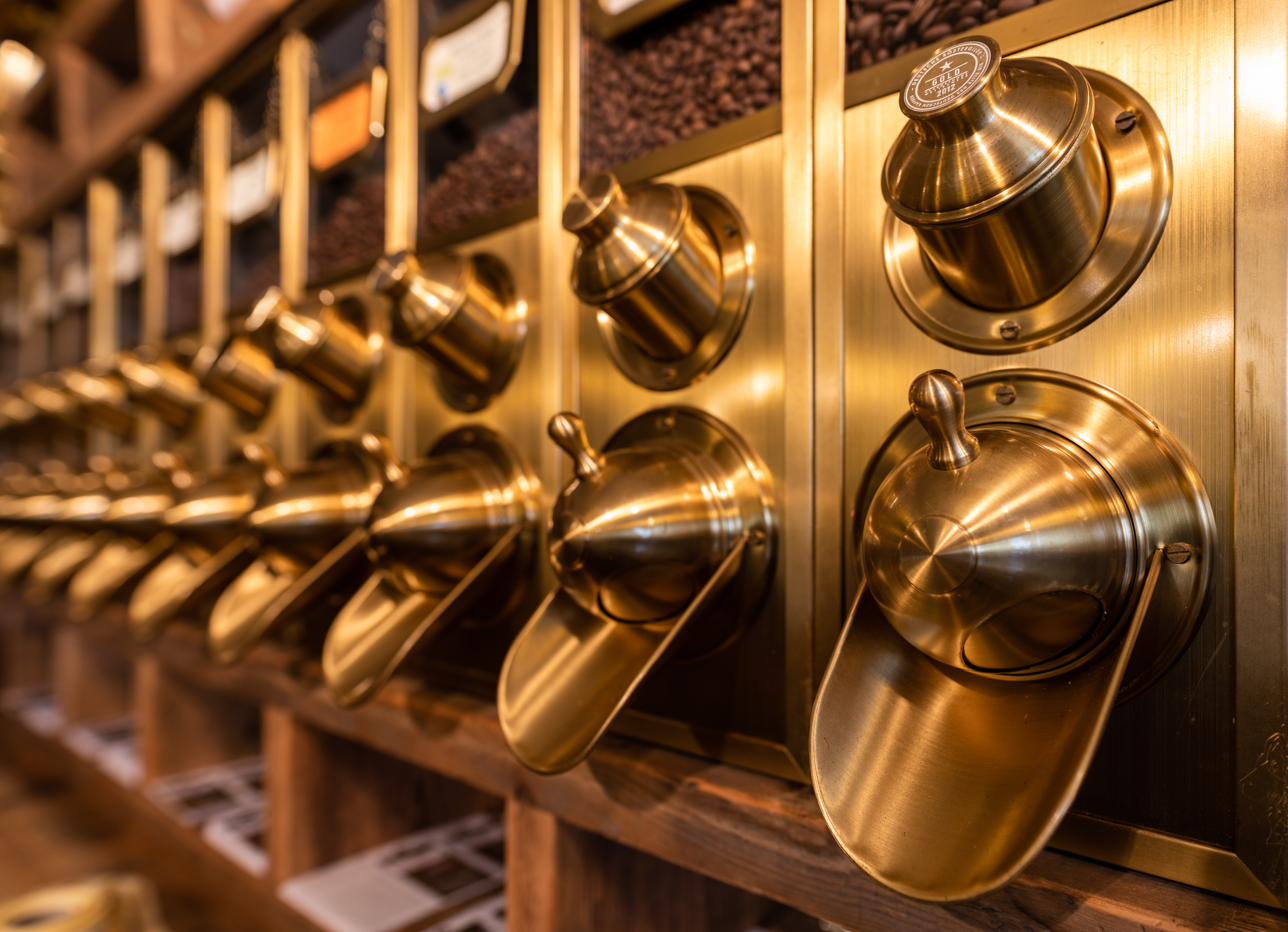
Coffee retailing

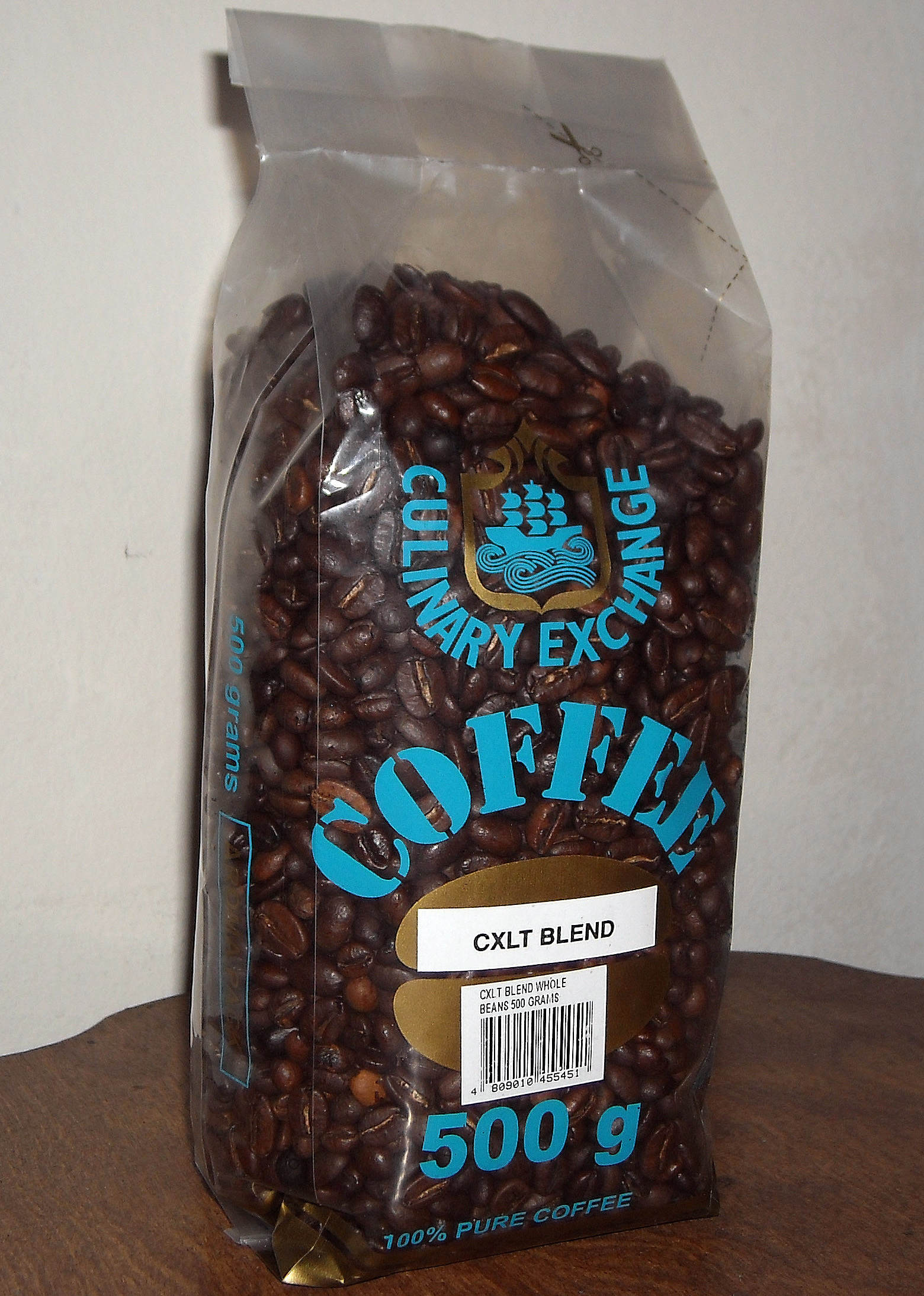
A bag of coffee beans

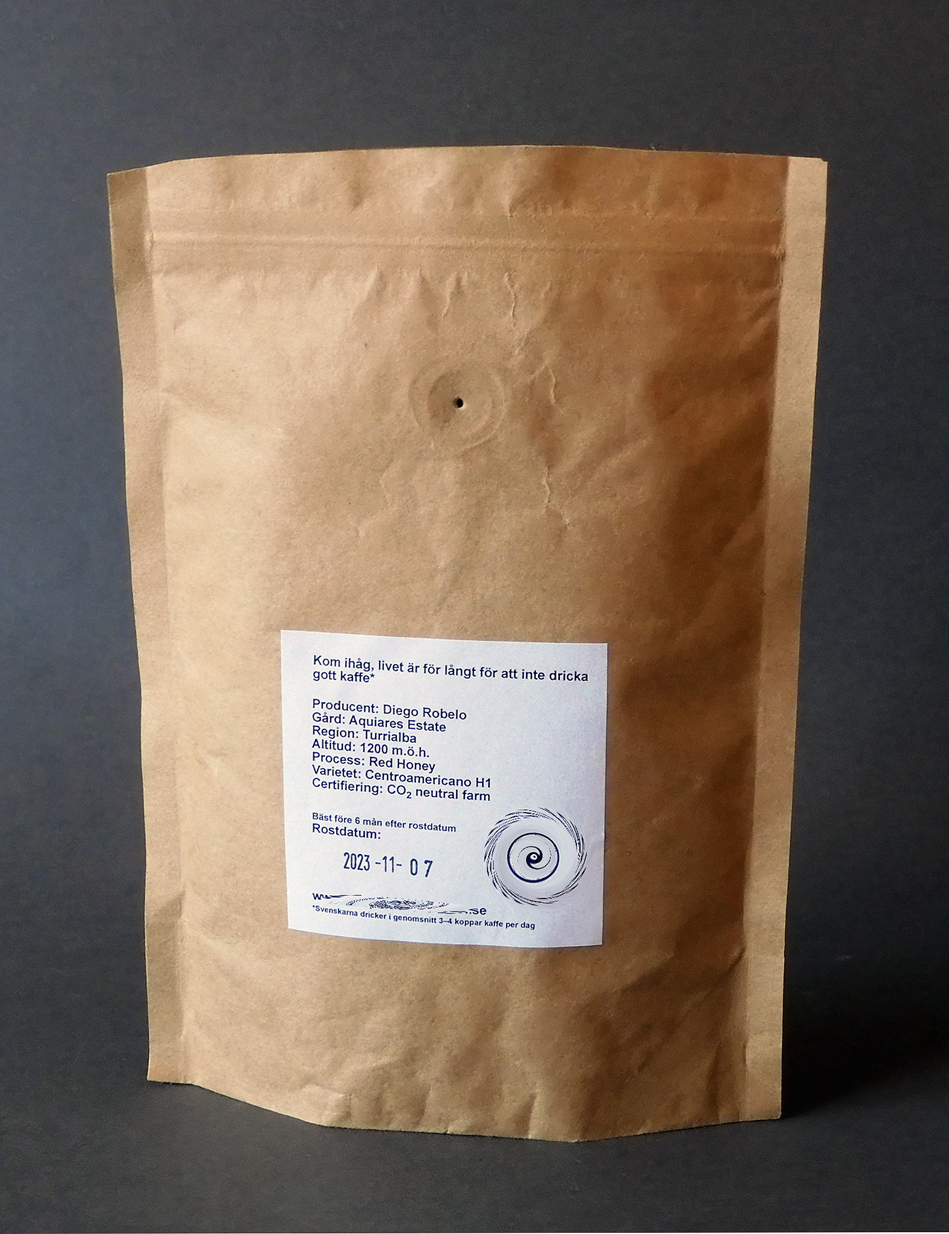
Bag with ziplock and one-way valve to prevent mold

Coffee is bought and sold as green coffee beans by roasters, investors, and price speculators as a tradable commodity in commodity markets and exchange-traded funds. Coffee futures contracts for Grade 3 washed arabicas are traded on the New York Mercantile Exchange under ticker symbol KC, with contract deliveries occurring every year in March, May, July, September, and December. Higher and lower grade arabica coffees are sold through other channels. Futures contracts for robusta coffee are traded on the London International Financial Futures and Options Exchange and, since 2007, on the New York Intercontinental Exchange.

Dating to the 1970s, coffee has been incorrectly described by many, including historian Mark Pendergrast, as the world's "second most legally traded commodity". Instead, "coffee was the second most valuable commodity exported by developing countries," from 1970 to circa 2000. This fact was derived from the United Nations Conference on Trade and Development Commodity Yearbooks which show "Third World" commodity exports by value in the period 1970–1998 with crude oil in first place, coffee in second, followed by sugar, cotton, and others. Coffee continues to be an important commodity export for developing countries, but more recent figures are not readily available due to the shifting and politicized nature of the category "developing country". Coffee is one of seven commodities included in the EU Regulation on Deforestation-free products, which aims to guarantee that the products European Union citizens consume do not contribute to deforestation or forest degradation worldwide.

International Coffee Day, which is claimed to have originated in Japan in 1983 with an event organized by the All Japan Coffee Association, takes place on 29 September in several countries. There are numerous trade associations and lobbying and other organizations representing the coffee industry.

=== Consumption ===
Coffee consumption, kilograms per capita, 2007

Nordic countries are the highest coffee-consuming nations when measured per capita per year, with consumption in Finland as the world's highest.

1. Finland – 26.45 lb (12.00 kg)
2. Norway – 21.82 lb (9.90 kg)
3. Iceland – 19.84 lb (9.00 kg)
4. Denmark – 19.18 lb (8.70 kg)
5. Netherlands – 18.52 lb (8.40 kg)
6. Sweden – 18.00 lb (8.16 kg)
7. Switzerland – 17.42 lb (7.90 kg)
8. Belgium – 15.00 lb (6.80 kg)
9. Luxembourg – 14.33 lb (6.50 kg)
10. Canada – 14.33 lb (6.50 kg)

An April 2024, National Coffee Association survey indicated that coffee consumption in the U.S. reached a 20-year high, with 67% of U.S. adults reporting drinking coffee in the past day. This is a significant increase compared to 2004 when fewer than half of U.S. adults reported coffee consumption in the past day. Drip coffee remains the most popular brewing method, but espresso-based beverages, particularly lattes, espresso shots, and cappuccinos, gained popularity.

=== Economic impacts ===
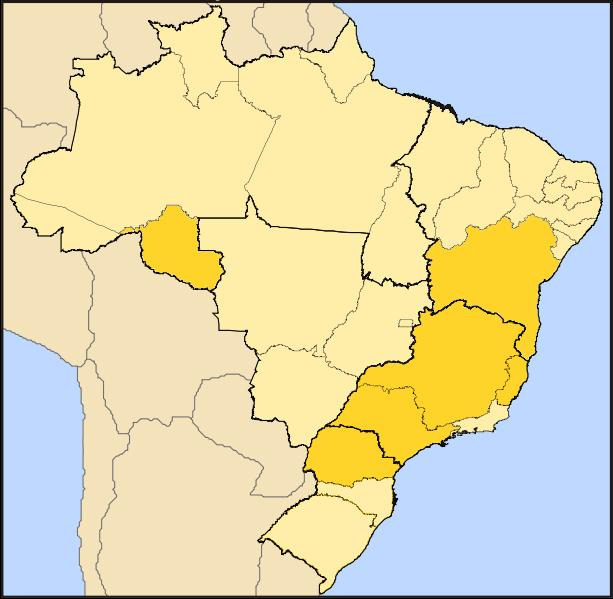
A map of coffee growing areas in Brazil

In 1830, market volatility and thus increased returns, encouraged Brazilian entrepreneurs to shift their attention from gold to coffee, a crop hitherto reserved for local consumption. Concurrent with this shift was the commissioning of vital infrastructures, including approximately 7,000 km (4,300 mi) of railroads between 1860 and 1885. The creation of these railways enabled the importation of workers, to meet the enormous need for labor. This development primarily affected the State of Rio de Janeiro, as well as the southern states of Brazil, most notably São Paulo, due to its favorable climate, soils, and terrain.

Coffee production attracted immigrants in search of better economic opportunities in the early 20th century. Mainly, these were Portuguese, Italian, Spanish, German, and Japanese nationals. For instance, São Paulo received approximately 733,000 immigrants in the 1890s, while only receiving approximately 201,000 immigrants in the six years before 1890. The production yield of coffee increased. In 1880, São Paulo produced 1.2 million bags (25% of total production), in 1888 2.6 million (40%), and in 1902 8 million bags (60%).

Coffee is then 63% of Brazil's exports. The gains made by this trade allow sustained economic growth in the country. The four years between planting a coffee and the first harvest extend seasonal variations in the price of coffee. The Brazilian government is thus forced, to some extent, to keep strong price subsidies during production periods.

=== Fair trade ===
The concept of fair trade labeling, which guarantees coffee growers a negotiated preharvest price, began in the late 1980s with the Max Havelaar Foundation's labeling program in the Netherlands. In 2004, 24,222 metric tons (of 7,050,000 produced worldwide) were fair trade; in 2005, 33,991 metric tons out of 6,685,000 were fair trade, an increase from 0.34% to 0.51%. A number of fair trade impact studies have shown that fair trade coffee produces a mixed impact on the communities that grow it. Many studies are skeptical about fair trade, reporting that it often worsens the bargaining power of those who are not part of it. The first fair-trade coffee was an effort to import Guatemalan coffee into Europe as "Indio Solidarity Coffee".

Since the founding of organizations such as the European Fair Trade Association (1987), the production and consumption of fair trade coffee has grown as some local and national coffee chains started to offer fair trade alternatives. For example, in April 2000, after a year-long campaign by the human rights organization Global Exchange, Starbucks decided to carry fair-trade coffee in its stores. Since September 2009 all Starbucks espresso beverages in UK and Ireland are made with Fairtrade and Shared Planet certified coffee.

A 2005 study in Belgium concluded that consumers' buying behavior is not consistent with their positive attitude toward ethical products. On average 46% of European consumers claimed to be willing to pay substantially more for ethical products, including fair-trade products such as coffee. The study found that the majority of respondents were unwilling to pay the actual price premium of 27% for fair trade coffee.

=== Specialty coffee and new trading relationships ===
Specialty coffee has driven a desire for more traceable coffee, and as such businesses are offering coffees that may come from a single origin, or a single lot from a single farm. This can give rise to the roaster developing a relationship with the producer, to discuss and collaborate on coffee. The roaster may also choose to cut out the importers and exporters to directly trade with the producer, or they may "fairly trade", where any third-parties involved in the transaction are thought to have added value, and there is a high level of transparency around the price, although often there is no certification to back it up. This process tends to only be done for high-quality products since keeping the coffee separate from other coffees adds costs, and so only coffee that roasters believe can command a higher price will be kept separate.

Some coffee is sold through internet auction – much of it is sold through a competition, with coffees passing through local and international jurors, and then the best coffees being selected to be bid on. Some estates known for high-quality coffee also sell their coffee through an online auction. This can lead to increased price transparency since the final price paid is usually published.

== Composition ==
Brewed coffee made from typical grounds and tap water is 99.4% water and contains 40 mg of caffeine per 100 ml with no essential nutrients in significant content. Restaurant-brewed espresso is 97.8% water and contains some dietary minerals, B vitamins, and 212 mg of caffeine per 100 ml.

Although polyphenols, particularly chlorogenic acid, are present in coffee, there is no evidence that the polyphenols impart a health benefit or have antioxidant value following ingestion. Overall, coffee components do not pose risks to health and do not provide health effects for adults consuming about 3–4 cups per day, which would supply 300–400 mg of caffeine per day.

== Research ==
In 2026, the American Heart Association stated that drinking as many as five cups of caffeinated coffee per day (intake of about 400 mg of caffeine per day) over adult life may benefit cardiovascular health in some people. The statement was based on a scientific review of human research indicating that regular coffee consumption may be associated with a reduced risk of type 2 diabetes and stroke, although considerable heterogeneity exists in the studies to date. Mechanisms for how habitual coffee consumption has cardiovascular effects are unknown.

Review of clinical trials found that drinking coffee is generally safe within usual levels of intake and is more likely to improve health outcomes than to cause harm at doses of 3–5 cups of coffee daily. Exceptions include a possible increased risk in women having bone fractures, and a possible increased risk in pregnant women of fetal loss or decreased birth weight. Results were complicated by poor study quality, and differences in age, gender, health status, and serving size.

Coffee may have laxative effects, inducing defecation in some people within minutes of consumption. The specific mechanism of action and chemical constituents responsible are still unknown, but caffeine is likely not responsible.

=== Caffeine content ===
Skeletal formula of a caffeine molecule

A psychoactive chemical in coffee – caffeine – is an adenosine receptor antagonist known for its stimulant effects. Depending on the type of coffee and method of preparation, the caffeine content of a single serving can vary greatly. The caffeine content of a cup of coffee varies depending mainly on the brewing method, and also on the coffee variety, such as 40 mg per 100 ml in regular coffee and 212 mg per 100 ml in espresso. According to a 1979 analysis, coffee has the following caffeine content, depending on how it is prepared:

	Serving size	Caffeine content
Brewed	200 mL (7 US fl oz)	80–135 mg
Drip	200 mL (7 US fl oz)	115–175 mg
Espresso	45–60 mL (1 1/2–2 US fl oz)	100 mg

Caffeine remains stable up to 200 °C (392 °F) and completely decomposes around 285 °C (545 °F). Given that roasting temperatures do not exceed 200 °C (392 °F) for long and rarely if ever reach 285 °C (545 °F), the caffeine content of a coffee is not likely changed much by the roasting process.

== Society and culture ==
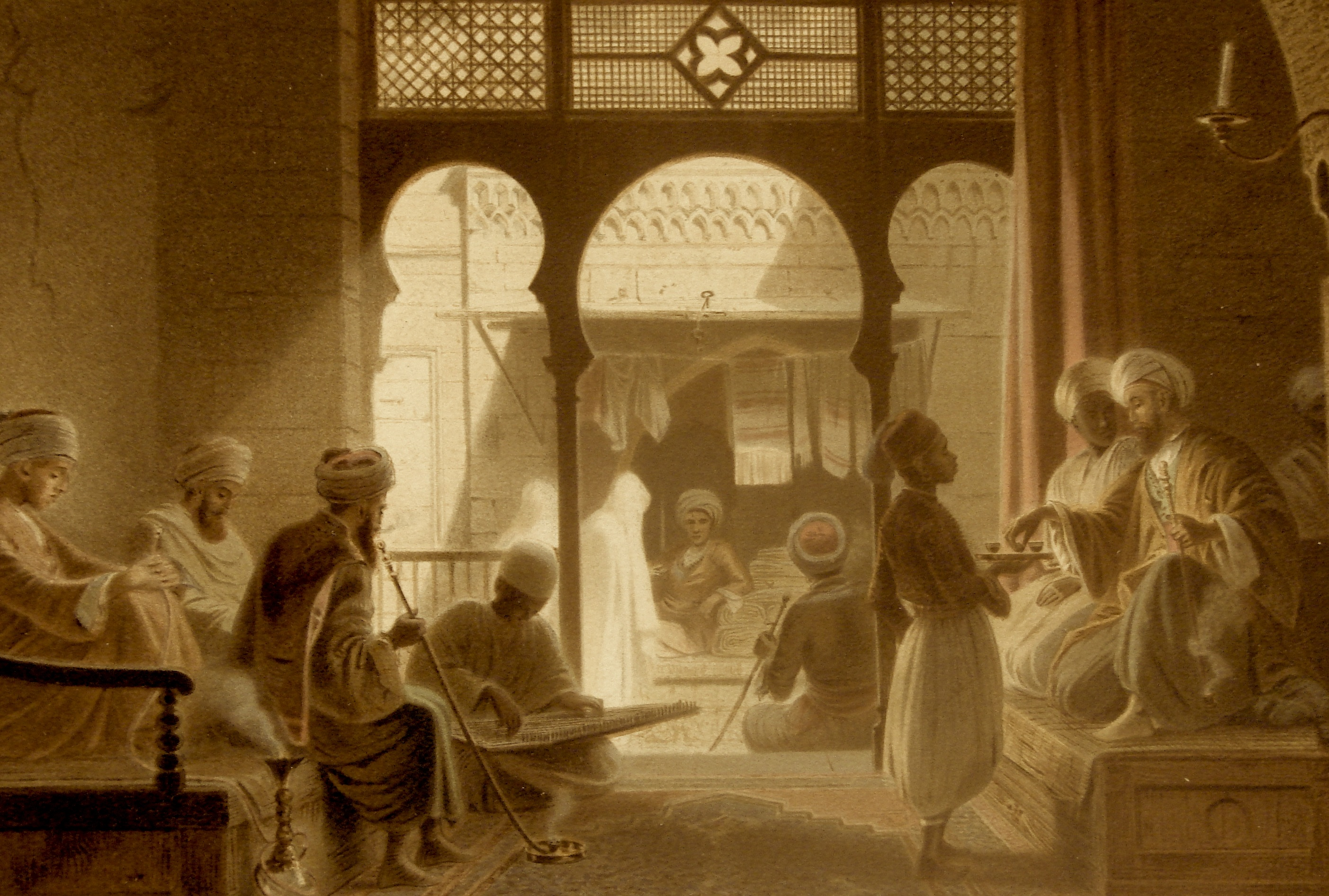
A coffeehouse in Cairo, 19th century

Coffee is often consumed alongside (or instead of) breakfast by many at home or when eating out at diners or cafeterias. It is often served at the end of a formal meal, normally with a dessert, and at times with an after-dinner mint, especially when consumed at a restaurant or dinner party.

=== Coffeehouses ===
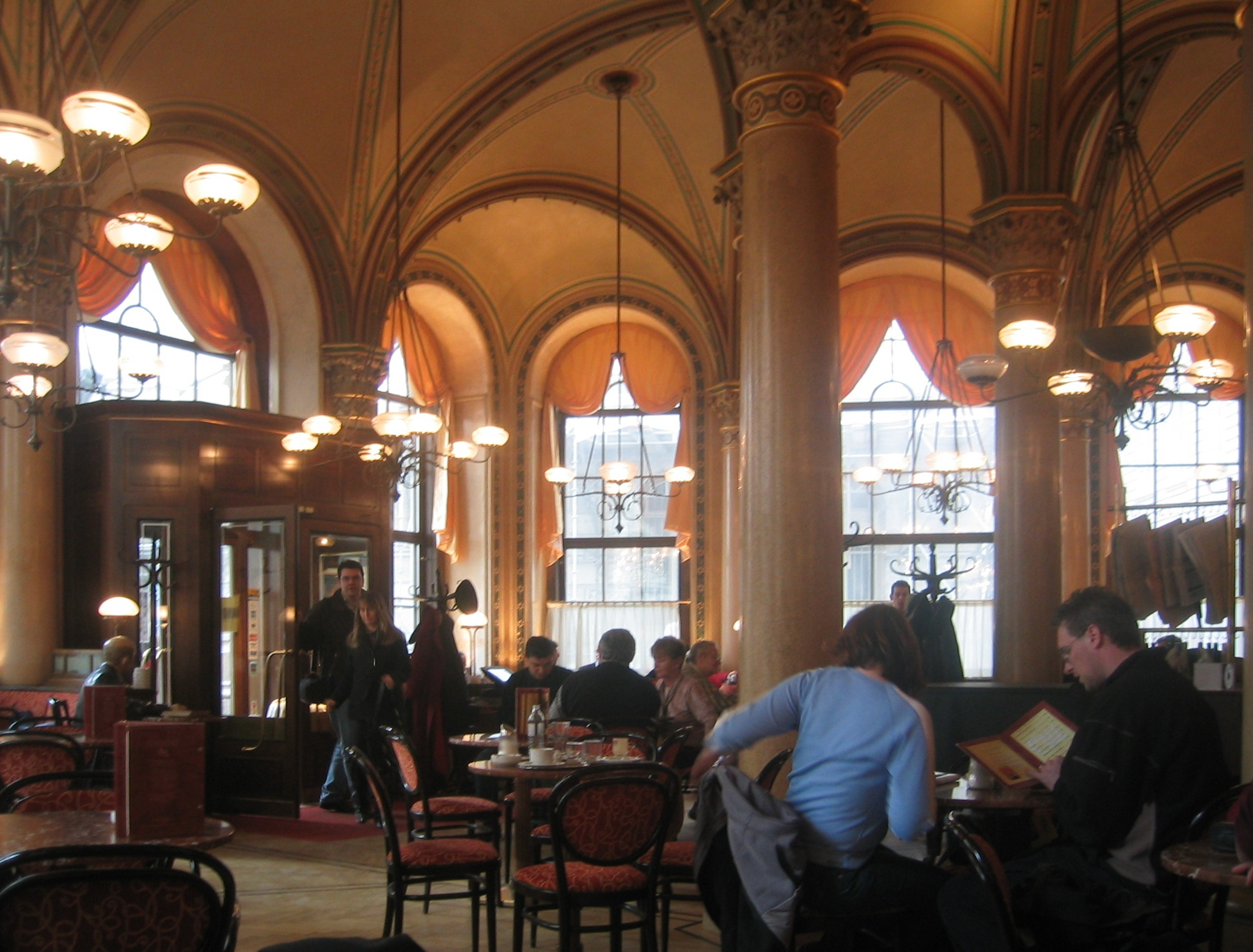
Café Central in Vienna, Austria. A staple of the Viennese coffee house tradition, it has remained open since 1876.

Widely known as coffeehouses or cafés, establishments serving prepared coffee or other hot beverages have existed for over 500 years. The first coffeehouse in Constantinople was opened in 1475 by traders arriving from Damascus and Aleppo.

A contemporary term for a person who makes coffee beverages, often a coffeehouse employee, is a barista. The Specialty Coffee Association of Europe and the Specialty Coffee Association of America have been influential in setting standards and providing training.

=== Break ===
The coffee break in the United States and elsewhere is a short mid-morning rest period granted to employees. It originated in the late 19th century in Stoughton, Wisconsin, with the wives of Norwegian immigrants. The city celebrates this every year with the Stoughton Coffee Break Festival. In 1951, Time noted that "since the war, the coffee break has been written into union contracts".

In 1952, the term became common through a Pan-American Coffee Bureau ad campaign which urged consumers, "Give yourself a Coffee-Break – and Get What Coffee Gives to You." John B. Watson, a behavioral psychologist who worked with Maxwell House later in his career, helped to popularize coffee breaks within American culture.

=== Prohibition and condemnation ===
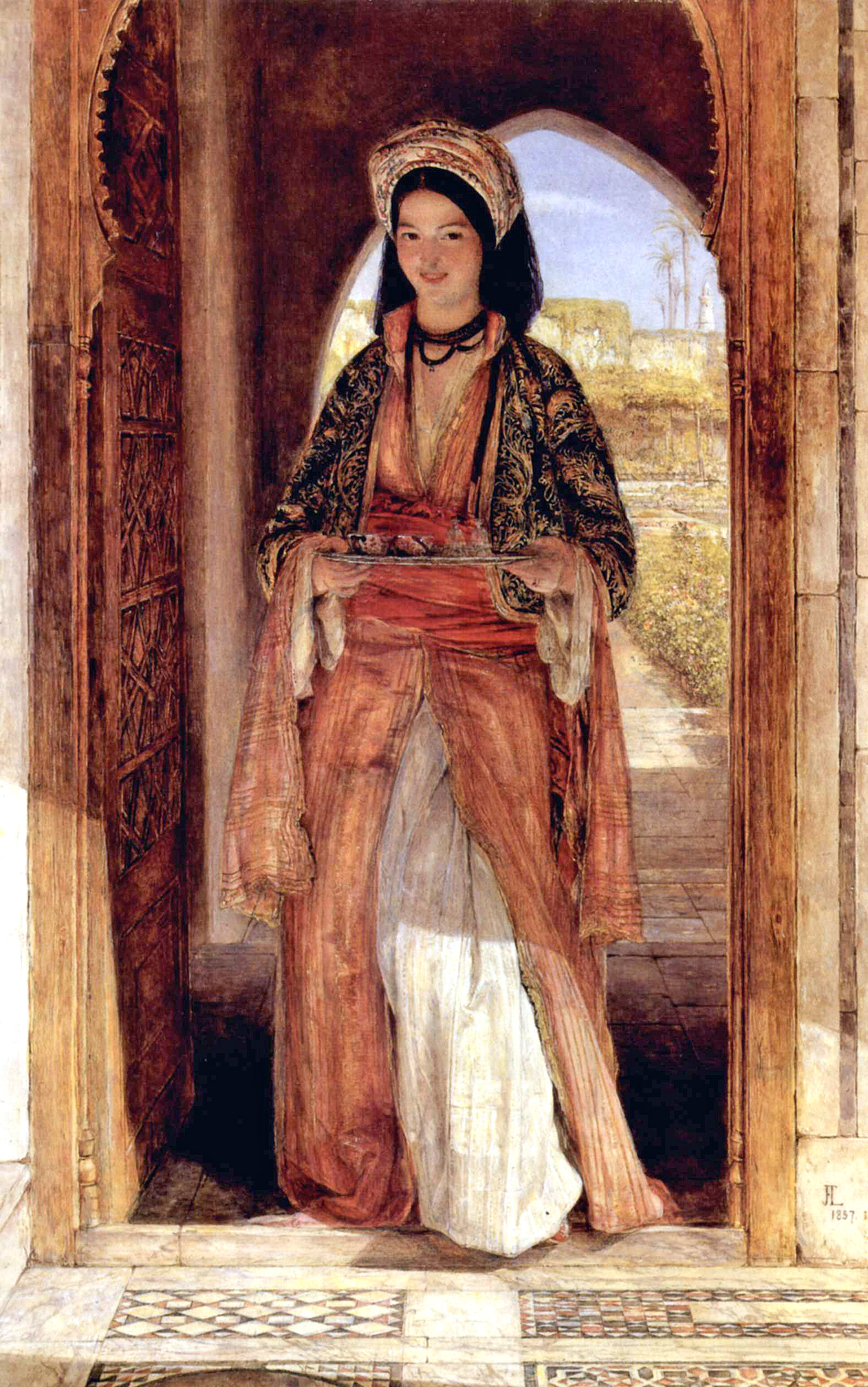
The Coffee Bearer, Cairo, an Orientalist painting by John Frederick Lewis (1857)

Historically, several religious groups have prohibited or condemned the consumption of coffee. The permissibility of coffee was debated in the Islamic world during the early 16th century, variously being permitted or prohibited until it was ultimately accepted by the 1550s. Contention existed among Ashkenazi Jews as to whether coffee was acceptable for Passover until it was certified kosher in 1923. Some Christian groups, such as Mormons and Seventh-day Adventists, discourage the consumption of coffee. Because of coffee's association with Muslims, Ethiopian Orthodox Christians avoided it until the end of the 19th century. Some Rastafarians also generally avoid coffee.

Coffee has been prohibited for political and economic reasons. King Charles II of England briefly outlawed coffeehouses to quell perceived rebellion. King Frederick the Great banned it in Prussia, concerned about the price of importing of coffee without production colonies. Sweden prohibited coffee in the 18th century for the same reasons. Coffee has seldom been prohibited based on its intoxicating effect.

=== Folklore and culture ===
There are many stories about coffee and its impact on people and society. The Oromo people would customarily plant a coffee tree on the graves of powerful sorcerers. They believed that the first coffee bush sprang up from the tears that the god of heaven shed over the corpse of a dead sorcerer. Johann Sebastian Bach was inspired to compose the humorous Coffee Cantata about coffee addiction, which was controversial in the early 18th century.

In the United States, coffee is sometimes called a "cup of Joe". The origin of this phrase is in dispute; a common story is that in World War I the US Secretary of the Navy Josephus "Joe" Daniels banned alcohol on navy ships which meant that the strongest drink available aboard the ship was black coffee. Sailors began referring to coffee as a "cup of Joe" in reference to Daniels. However, this story may be apocryphal since the first written account of it was in 1930, some 15 years later. Another explanation is that a formerly popular nickname for coffee, jamoke, from mocha java, was shortened to Joe. A third origin story is that since coffee is such a commonly consumed beverage, it is the drink of the average Joe.

== See also ==
- Coffee cup sleeve
- Coffee cup
- Coffee cupping
- Coffee in Japan
- Coffee in South Korea
- Colombian coffee growing axis
- Eight O'Clock Coffee
- Khat
- List of coffee dishes
- List of coffee drinks
- List of coffeehouse chains
- Sanka
- Third-wave coffee
- Viennese coffee house
