= CWD =

CWD may refer to:

== Biology ==
- Cantabrian Water Dog, Spanish dog breed
- Cell wall-deficient bacteria (or L forms)
- Chronic wasting disease, of deer
- Coarse woody debris, fallen trees and branches
- Coffee wilt disease, in coffee trees
- Common and well-documented, of human leukocyte antigen alleles

== Train stations ==
- Chatswood railway station, Sydney, Australia
- Chawinda railway station, Punjab province, Pakistan
- Collingwood railway station, Melbourne, Australia
- Creswell railway station, Derbyshire, England

== Technology ==
- Cadwaladerite, an aluminium halide mineral
- A locomotive; see Indian locomotive class XD
- Current working directory, in computing

== Other uses ==
- Canada's Worst Driver, a television series (2005–2018)
- Clwyd, a preserved county of Wales (in genealogy)
- Woods Cree language, spoken in Canada (ISO 639-3:cwd)
