= Gibberella xylarioides =

Scientific classification
- Domain: Eukaryota
- Kingdom: Fungi
- Division: Ascomycota
- Class: Sordariomycetes
- Order: Hypocreales
- Family: Nectriaceae
- Genus: Gibberella
- Species: G. xylarioides

Binomial name
- Gibberella xylarioides R. Heim & Saccas, (1950)

Synonyms
- Fusarium oxysporum f. xylarioides (Steyaert) Delassus, (1954); Fusarium xylarioides Steyaert, (1948)

Species of fungus

Gibberella xylarioides (Fusarium xylarioides) is a species of fungus in the family Nectriaceae. It is the causative agent of coffee wilt disease (CWD). The disease caused a severe problem in several countries in West and East Africa during the 1940s and 1950s. CWD was first seen in Coffea liberica.

== Hosts ==
Main hosts

Coffea arabica (arabica coffee)

Coffea canephora (robusta coffee)

Coffea liberica (Liberian coffee tree)

Other hosts

Gossypium (cotton)

Musa × paradisiaca (plantain)

== Signs and symptoms ==
Similar to other vascular wilt pathogens, the fungus colonizes the xylem, causing the flow of water to be cut off. It can be diagnosed by several visual signs, such as The leaves wilting, having vein necrosis and abscission. The coffee bark, when scraped with a knife, will have a blue-black coloration and the berries will appear as though they are ripening prematurely but will stay on the coffee plant after the leaves have fallen off. Necrosis can often be seen near the collar of the plant.

Young trees can be killed within a few days of infection while more mature coffee plants can survive up to 8 months.

Gibberella xylarioides (Sexual form) will make purple perithecia and ascospores, but resting structures are rarely found in the soil. Fusarium xylarioides (Asexual form) make sickle shaped conidia and are spread by wind, rain, and human activities like weeding and harvesting.

== Management ==
Other methods of management include:

- Removal of diseased trees and burning is the most successful method of eradication of Coffee Wilt. Coffea sp. should not be replanted in soil for six months to avoid infection of seedlings.
- Be cautious when weeding around coffee plants to avoid injuring the bark as the fungus can enter the bark through wounds
- Using planting tools that are free of disease
- Spraying the soil surface with 2.5% copper (II) sulphate
- Breeding resistance—"The results of greenhouse inoculation experiments proved that there was important diversity in coffee populations (within and among the forest sites) in reaction to G. xylariodies infection."
