= Coffee wilt disease =

Coffee tree disease

Coffee wilt disease (tracheomycosis) is a common wilt that results in complete death of coffee trees it infects. This vascular disease is induced by the fungal pathogen known by its teleomorph Gibberella xylarioides (Fusarium xylarioides). In 1927, coffee wilt disease (CWD) was first observed in the Central African Republic where it developed slowly and went on to cause two epidemics between the 1930s and the 1960s. Coffee wilt disease was first seen in Coffea excelsa.

== Host ==
Hosts of coffee wilt disease include Coffea arabica (Arabica coffee), Coffea canephora (Robusta coffee), Coffea liberica (Liberian coffee), and Coffea excelsa (Excelsa coffee). Currently, the disease is limited to Eastern and Central Africa; however, studies have shown that most Coffea species are likely to be susceptible to the disease, which can potentially lead to more worldwide problems in the coffee industry.

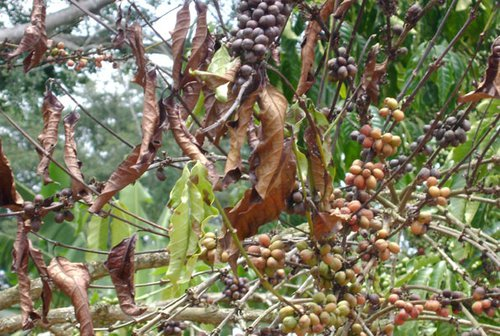
Robusta coffee tree infected by coffee wilt disease, credit The Mediae Company

== Symptoms and signs ==
Due to the nature of coffee wilt disease, coffee plants often exhibit symptoms of disruption to vascular systems. Internal symptoms are disturbances to conduction of water in the plant. External symptoms include loss of moisture on leaves, discoloration, leaf loss, dieback of the infected region, swelling of trunks, cracks in mature trees and lastly plant death. Signs of coffee wilt disease include small blackish-brown perithecia caused by the sexual stage of the fungus, and cracks in the bark which cause an observable bluish-black stain on the wood.

== Disease cycle ==
The fungal pathogen responsible for coffee wilt disease can exist on coffee trees as Gibberella xylarioides, the sexual or perfect stage, or as Fusarium xylarioides, the asexual or imperfect stage. Coffee wilt disease is spread by wind-born ascospores during its sexual stage or splash-borne conidia, where they land and can persist as a viable source of inoculum in the soil. Infection occurs via penetration of wounds at the base of stems, mainly by the imperfect stage Fusarium xylarioides. Once the plant is infected, the fungus blocks the xylem system, which induces host responses that inevitably result in plant death.

== Importance ==
Coffee is a major cash crop, with over 2.5 million people directly depending on its production and trade as a livelihood. For some countries, coffee accounts for 50% of primary foreign exchange, valued around 300–400 million dollars annually. Reduced coffee production causes decline of revenue for some African countries, which can also increase food insecurity and overall regression at grassroot level. In 1945 coffee wilt disease destroyed most of Central Africa Republic's Excelsa plantations, resulting in the complete collapse of the crop. This disease causes a threat for coffee growers around the globe as the disease reduces the quantity and quality of the coffee. Not only does this disease put an economic strain on countries that use coffee as a cash crop, but it also can lead to the rise of coffee prices for consumers everywhere.

== Management ==
Once a coffee plant is infected by coffee wilt disease, death is inevitable, making prevention the most beneficial for coffee growers. Diagnosis of coffee wilt disease can be made by observing a blue-black staining after bark scraping. Additionally, regular root inspections are an effective measure to catch the disease in the early stages. Once disease is found, destruction of the coffee plant by cutting it at the ground level and burning it stops the spread of the infection to other plants. Restriction of movement for coffee plant, coffee husks mulch and planting materials are also useful. Relocation of coffee production or replanting of resistant C. canephora germplasm, assist with combating future spread. Preventive measures for coffee wilt disease infection are to avoid wounding of trees for example when removing control weeds, fertilizing soil or by grazing of any animals. Additionally, maintaining plants' health by using inorganic fertilizer, manure or mulch to conserve moisture are some ways to decrease the risk of coffee wilt disease.
