= Faiz Ahmed Faiz Passenger =

Pakistani express train

Overview
- Service type: Passenger train
- First service: 2014
- Current operator: Pakistan Railways

Route
- Termini: Lahore Junction; Narowal Junction
- Stops: 11
- Distance travelled: 84 kilometres (52 mi)
- Average journey time: 2 hours, 35 minutes
- Service frequency: Daily
- Train numbers: 209UP (Lahore→Narowal); 210DN (Narowal→Lahore)

On-board services
- Class: Economy Class
- Sleeping arrangements: Not Available
- Catering facilities: Not Available

Technical
- Track gauge: 1,676 mm (5 ft 6 in)
- Track owner: Pakistan Railways

Faiz Ahmed Faiz Passenger is a passenger train operated daily by Pakistan Railways between Lahore and Narowal. The trip takes approximately 2 hours and 35 minutes to cover a published distance of 84 kilometres (52 mi), traveling along a stretch of the Karachi–Peshawar Railway Line and Shahdara Bagh–Chak Amru Branch Line. The train named after Faiz Ahmad Faiz, a famous Pakistani intellectual, revolutionary poet, and one of the most celebrated writers of the Urdu language,.

== Route ==
- Lahore Junction–Shahdara Bagh Junction via Karachi–Peshawar Railway Line
- Shahdara Bagh Junction–Narowal Junction via Shahdara Bagh–Chak Amru Branch Line

== Station stops ==
- Lahore Junction
- Badami Bagh
- Shahdara Bagh Junction
- Srirampura
- Kala Khatai
- Narang
- Mehta Suja
- Baddomalhi
- Raya Khas
- Pejowali
- Narowal Junction

== Equipment ==
The train has Economy Class accommodations.
