= Lasani Express =

Pakistani passenger train

Overview
- Service type: Inter-city rail
- Current operator: Pakistan Railways

Route
- Termini: Lahore Junction; Sialkot Junction
- Stops: 15
- Distance travelled: 148 kilometres (92 mi)
- Average journey time: 4 hours, 10 minutes
- Service frequency: Daily
- Train numbers: 125UP (Lahore→Sialkot); 126DN (Sialkot→Lahore)

On-board services
- Class: Economy Class

Technical
- Track gauge: 1,676 mm (5 ft 6 in)
- Track owner: Pakistan Railways

Lasani Express (Urdu: لاثانی ایکسپریس) is a passenger train named after Sufi saint Peer Syed Jama'at Ali Shah-e-Lasani of Ali Pur Sayyedan (in Narowal), operated daily by Pakistan Railways between Lahore and Sialkot. The trip takes approximately 4 hours and 10 minutes to cover a published distance of 127 kilometres (79 mi), traveling along a stretch of the Karachi–Peshawar Railway Line, Shahdara Bagh–Chak Amru Branch Line and Wazirabad–Narowal Branch Line.

== Route ==
- Lahore Junction–Shahdara Bagh Junction via Karachi–Peshawar Railway Line
- Shahdara Bagh Junction–Narowal Junction via Shahdara Bagh–Chak Amru Branch Line
- Narowal Junction–Sialkot Junction via Wazirabad–Narowal Branch Line

== Station stops ==
- Lahore Junction
- Shahdara Bagh Junction
- Kala Khatai
- Narang
- Mehta Suja
- Baddomalhi
- Raya Khas
- Pejowali
- Narowal Junction
- Domala
- Qila Sobha Singh
- Pasrur
- Chawinda
- Gunna Kalan
- Sialkot Junction

== Equipment ==
The train has Economy Class accommodations.

== Incidents ==
On 14 June 2016, the engine of the Lahore-bound Lasani Express (126 Down) broke down near Baddomalhi railway station near Pasrur. Passengers and crew had to wait up to 8 hours for a replacement engine to arrive.
