= Anup =

Anup (Sanskrit: अनुप anūpa) is an Indian masculine given name. The Sanskrit word anūpa has the following meanings: 'watery', 'situated near the water', 'bank of a river', 'pond', 'lagoon'. The meaning of the name “Anup” is: "Incomparable, unequalled; unique; pond.

== Notable people ==
=== Anup ===
- Anup Baral (born 1968), actor, writer, director of Nepal
- Anup Bhandari, writer, director, music director, lyricist and actor who works primarily in Kannada cinema
- Anup Chetia (real name Golap Baruah), General Secretary of the banned United Liberation Front of Assam in Assam
- Anup Singh Choudry (born 1949), Sikh writer formerly based in the United Kingdom who was also a justice of the High Court of Uganda
- Anup Das (born 1964), Indian former cricketer
- Anup Dave (born 1981), Indian first-class cricketer who represented Rajasthan
- Anup D'Costa (born 1993), Indian volleyball player
- Anup Ghatak (1941–2013), Indian cricketer
- Anup Ghoshal (1945–2023), singer in Hindi films and other vernacular Indian films
- Anup Jalota (born 1953), Indian singer/musician, best known for his performances of the bhajan and the ghazal
- Anup Kaphle, Nepali journalist, editor-in-chief of Rest of World
- Anup Kumar (actor) (1932–1997), actor from India
- Anup Kumar (kabaddi), Indian professional Kabaddi player and Coach
- Anup Kumar (politician), Fiji Indian politician who won the Vanua Levu West Indian Communal Constituency
- Anup Kumar Saha, member of the Parliament of India
- Anup Kumar Yama (born 1984), Indian Roller Skate Athlete
- Anup Menon or Anoop Menon, Indian film actor, screenwriter and lyricist
- Anup Mishra or Anoop Mishra (born 1956), Indian politician from the Bharatiya Janata Party
- Anup Nathu (born 1960), New Zealand cricketer
- Anup Chandra Pandey (born 1959), retired Indian Administrative Service (IAS) officer
- Anup Pandalam, Indian film director
- Anup Paul, English singer, songwriter, producer, engineer, mixer and recording artist from Rayners Lane, United Kingdom
- Anup Phukan, former member of Asom Gana Parishad politician from Assam
- Anup Rai, Bargujar Rajput nobleman in seventeenth century India, courtier of the Mughal emperor, Jahangir
- Anup Revanna, Indian actor who works in Kannada cinema
- Anup Rubens, born Enoch Rubens, Indian film music composer who predominantly works in Telugu cinema
- Anup Kumar Saha (born 1956), Indian politician and former Member of Parliament
- Anup Sengupta, Bengali film director and producer
- Anup Raj Sharma, the Chief Justice of Nepal from 11 February to 25 March 2010
- Anup Singh (filmmaker) (born 1961), Geneva based filmmaker
- Anup Singh (politician) (1903–1969), Indian politician from Punjab
- Anup Singh of Bikaner (1638–1698), ruler of Bikaner State during 1669–1698
- Anup Singh Choudry (born 1950), Sikh writer and businessman, now a High Court judge in Uganda
- Anup Soni (born 1965), Indian film and television actor
- Anup Sridhar (born 1983), male badminton player from India
- Anup Mathew Thomas (born 1977), visual artist who lives and works in Bangalore
- Anup Upadhyay, Indian actor, known for his work in serials
- Anup Wadhawan, the Commerce Secretary for the Government of India
- Anup Lal Yadav (1923–2013), Indian politician
- Anup Kumar Yama (born 1984), Indian roller skate athlete
- Anup Katariaa (born 1983), Marketing Expert creating demand and value for leading brands

=== Anoop ===
- Anoop Desai (born 1986), American singer-songwriter
- Anoop Jacob (born 1977), Indian politician
- Anoop Kumar (1929–1997), Indian actor
- Anoop Kumar Mittal (born 1960), Indian engineer
- Anoop Malhotra (born 1955), Indian general
- Anoop Menon (born 1977), Indian actor
- Anoop Nayak, British academic
- Anoop Suri (born 1971), Indian hotel manager
- Anoop Swarup (born 1959), Indian academic

=== Anupa ===
- Anupa Barla (born 1994), Indian female field hockey player
- Anupa Pasqual (born 1964), Sri Lankan politician

== See also ==
- Anup Kumar (disambiguation)
- Anup Nagar, census town in West Bengal, India
- Anupa
