= Darbar Sahib Kartar Pur railway station =

Railway station in Pakistan

Darbar Sahib Kartarpur Station دربار صاحب کرتار پور ریلوے سٹیشن

General information
- Coordinates: 32.110268°N 75.0096276°E
- Owner: Ministry of Railways
- Line: Shahdara Bagh–Chak Amru Branch Line

Services
| Preceding station | Pakistan Railways | Following station |
|---|---|---|
| Jassar Junction towards Shahdara Bagh Junction | Shahdara Bagh–Chak Amru Branch Line | Nurkot towards Chak Amru |
Location

Darbar Sahib Kartarpur Railway Station (Punjabi, Urdu: دربار صاحب کرتار پور ریلوے سٹیشن) is located in Kartarpur village, Narowal district of Punjab province, Pakistan.

== See also ==
- List of railway stations in Pakistan
- Pakistan Railways
