= Shakargarh railway station =

Railway station in Punjab, Pakistan

Shakargarh Railway Station تحصیل شکرگڑھ ریلوے اسٹیشن

General information
- Coordinates: 32.2707°N 75.1555°E
- Owner: Ministry of Railways
- Line: Shahdara Bagh–Chak Amru Branch Line

Other information
- Station code: SKGR

Services
Preceding station	Pakistan Railways	Following station
Nurkot towards Shahdara Bagh Junction	Shahdara Bagh–Chak Amru Branch Line	Mariyal towards Chak Amru
Location

Shakargarh Railway Station (Urdu: تحصیل شکرگڑھ ریلوے اسٹیشن, Punjabi: تحصیل شکرگڑھ ریلوے اسٹیشن) is located in Shakargarh city, Narowal district of Punjab province, Pakistan.

== See also ==
- List of railway stations in Pakistan
- Pakistan Railways
