= Shahdara Bagh–Chak Amru Branch Line =

Railway line in Pakistan

Shahdara Bagh–Chak Amru Branch Line شاہدرہ باغ-چک امرُو فرعی ریلوے خط

Overview
- Owner: Pakistan Railways
- Termini: Shahdara Bagh Junction; Chak Amru
- Stations: 11

Service
- Operator: Pakistan Railways

History
- Opened: 22 August 1926

Technical
- Line length: 129 km (80 mi)
- Track gauge: 1,676 mm (5 ft 6 in)
- Operating speed: 40 km/h (25 mph)

Shahdara Bagh–Chak Amru Branch Line (Urdu: شاہدرہ باغ-چک امرُو فرعی ریلوے خط) is one of several semi-operational branch rail lines in Pakistan. It is operated and maintained by Pakistan Railways. The line runs from Shahdara Bagh Junction station to Narowal Junction, extending 77 kilometers (48 mi) to Narowal Junction and 52 kilometers (32 mi) from Narowal Junction to Chak Amru. Total length of this line is 129 kilometers (80 mi). It includes 10 active stations.

This track is important for the movement of the Army.

Shakargarh station is the biggest station in the Narowal to Chak Amru section. It is the city of 8 lakh peoples and it includes many villages.

Shakargarh is now part of Narowal district. Before partition Shakargarh was tehsil of Gurdaspur.

The Shahdara Bagh Junction to Narowal Junction track is poorly maintained. Its maximum speed is 40 kmph. A previous government spent 359 million rupees on Narowal railway station. Five trains are running on this branch line which are Allama Iqbal Express, Lasani Express, Sialkot Express, Narowal Passenger and Faiz Ahmed Faiz Passenger

== Narowal to Chak Amru section ==
The line originally ran from Shahdara Bagh Junction station to Chak Amru station, but was later shortened to only reach Narowal. Residents living along the closed section demanded that the section be reopened, including Shakargarh MPA Ghayasuddin.

Railway minister Sheikh Rasheed Ahmed stated that the Kartarpur station would be reconstructed to ease the journey for Sikh pilgrims. In February 2017, the Ministry of Railways began a new study for the reconstruction of the 45 kilometers (28 mi) section.

== Stations ==
The railway stations on this railway line are:

- Shahdara Bagh
- Kot Mul Chand (Abandoned)
- Babakwal (Abandoned)
- Srirampura
- Chak Saiyiadanwala Halt (Abandoned)
- Kala Khatai
- Shah Sultan Halt (Abandoned)
- Narang
- Khundda Ladheke (Abandoned)
- Mehta Suja
- Baddomalhi
- Alamgir Town Halt (Abandoned)
- Raya Khas
- Daud
- Pejowali
- Kalas Goraya (Abandoned)
- Narowal Junction

Closed section

- Jassar Junction
- Hazart Shama Ghaus Halt
- Darbar Sahib Kartar Pur
- Boston Afghanan
- Nurkot
- Shakargarh
- Mariyal
- Chak Amru

== See also ==
- Pakistan Railways
