= Narowal Junction railway station =

Railway station in Narowal, Pakistan

Narowal Junction Station نارووال جنکشن ریلوے اسٹیشن
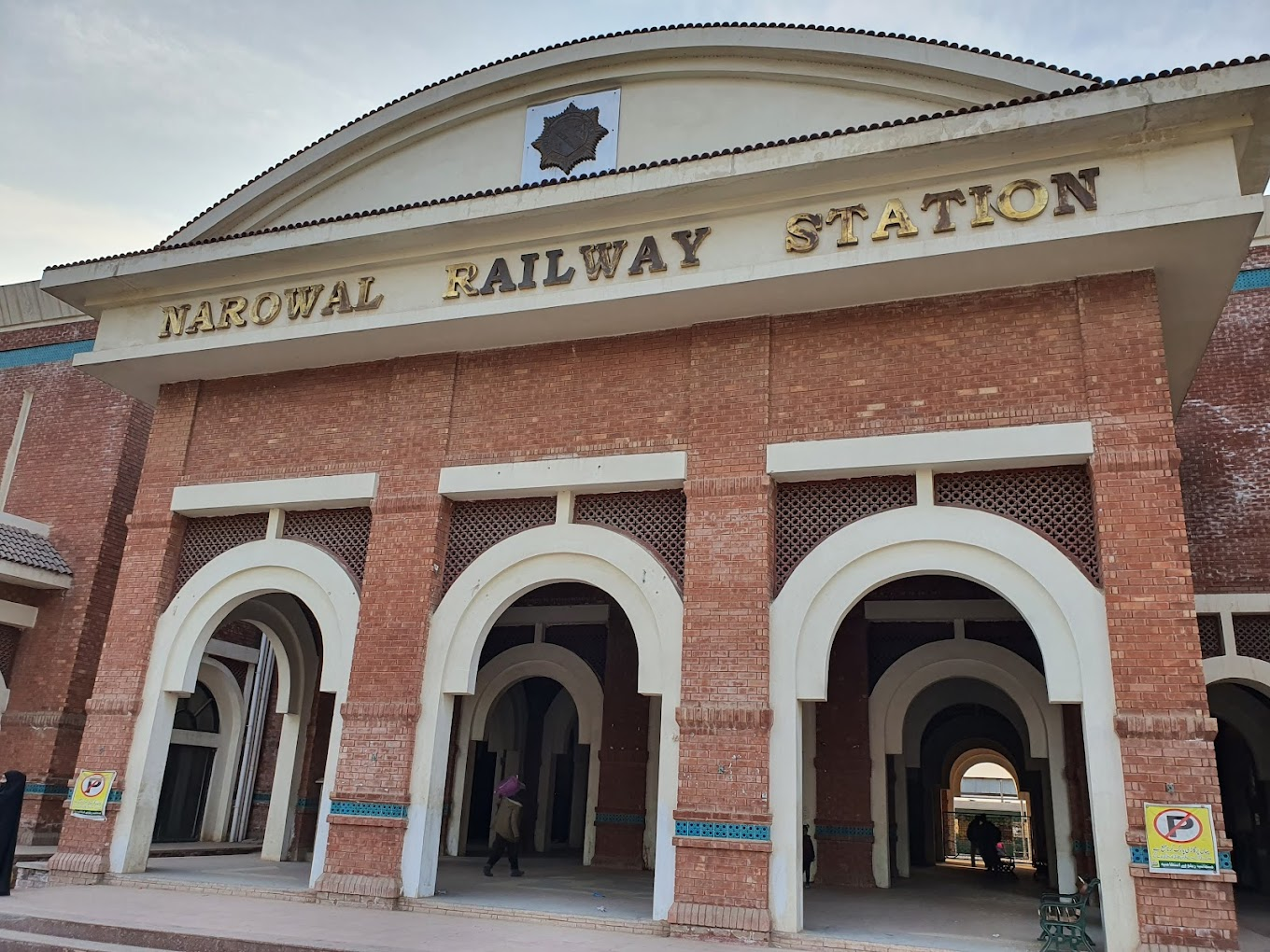

General information
- Coordinates: 32.1010°N 74.8647°E
- Owner: Ministry of Railways
- Lines: Shahdara Bagh–Chak Amru Branch Line; Wazirabad–Narowal Branch Line
- Platforms: 3

Construction
- Parking: Available
- Accessible: Available

Other information
- Station code: NWL

History
- Opened: 1927

Services
Preceding station	Pakistan Railways	Following station
Kalas Goraya Halt towards Shahdara Bagh Junction	Shahdara Bagh–Chak Amru Branch Line	Jassar Junction towards Chak Amru
Domala towards Wazirabad Junction	Wazirabad–Narowal Branch Line	Terminus
Location

Narowal Junction Railway Station (Urdu: نارووال جنکشن ریلوے اسٹیشن, Punjabi: نارووال جنکشن ریلوے اسٹیشن) is located in Narowal city, Narowal district of Punjab province of Pakistan. It is the junction station of 132.3 km (82 mi) long Narowal-Wazirabad, 36.7 km (23 mi) long Narowal-Dera Baba Nanak till 1947 and 56.9 km (35 mi) long Jassar-Chak Amru railway lines. Now Narowal-Dera Baba Nanak railway line had been permanently closed from 1999 due to aftermath of 1999 Kargil War. The Jassar-Chak Amru railway line is in bad shape now and no passenger service is operated currently.

== History ==
The railway station was constructed in 1927.

In 2017, the railway station was rescontructed and a new building was inaugurated in 2018.

== See also ==
- List of railway stations in Pakistan
- Pakistan Railways

== Gallery ==
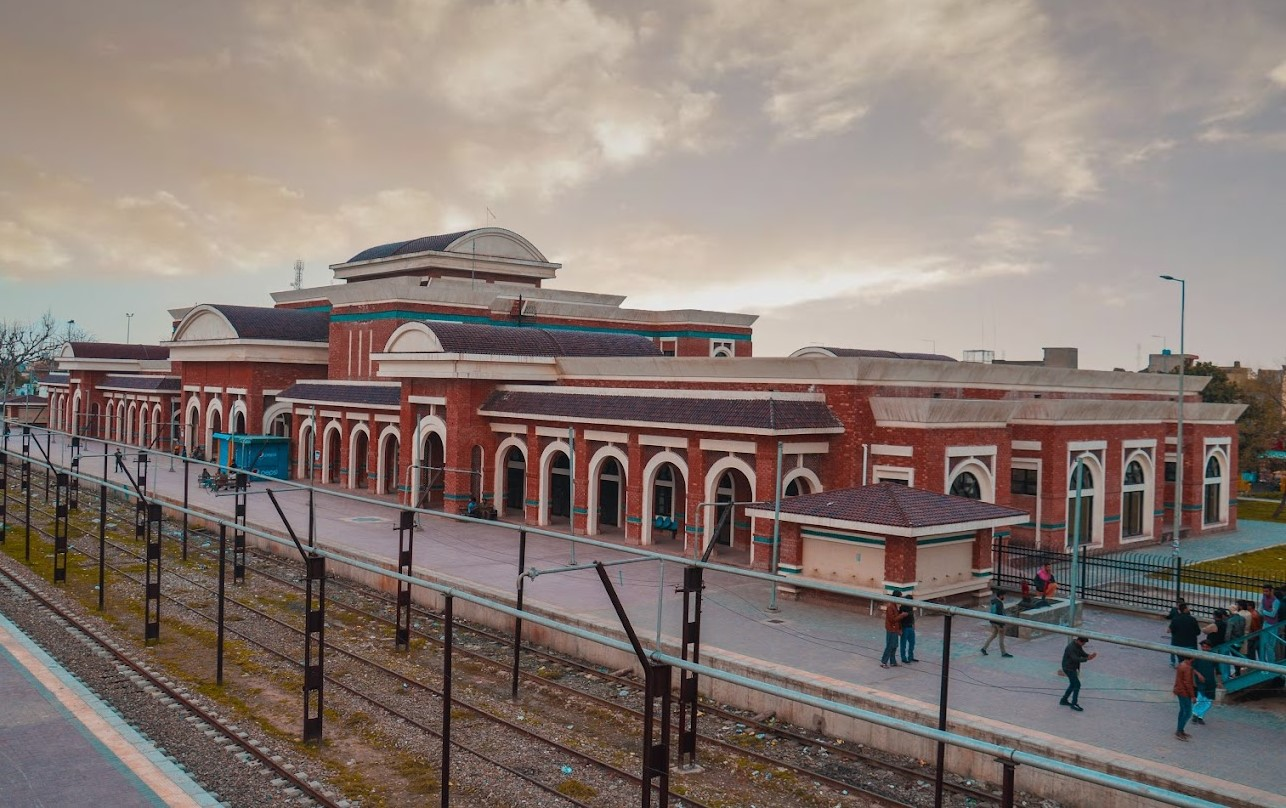

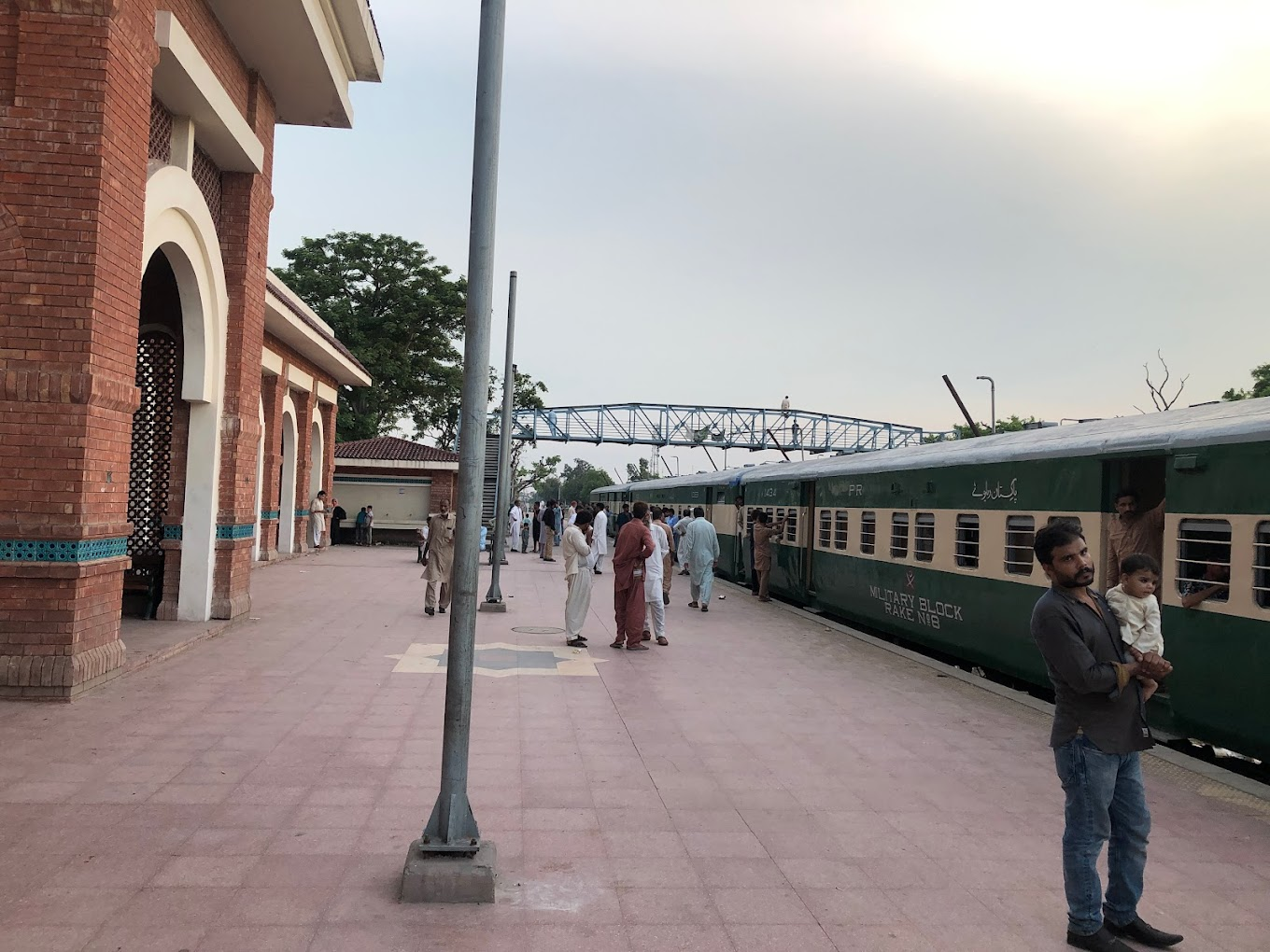

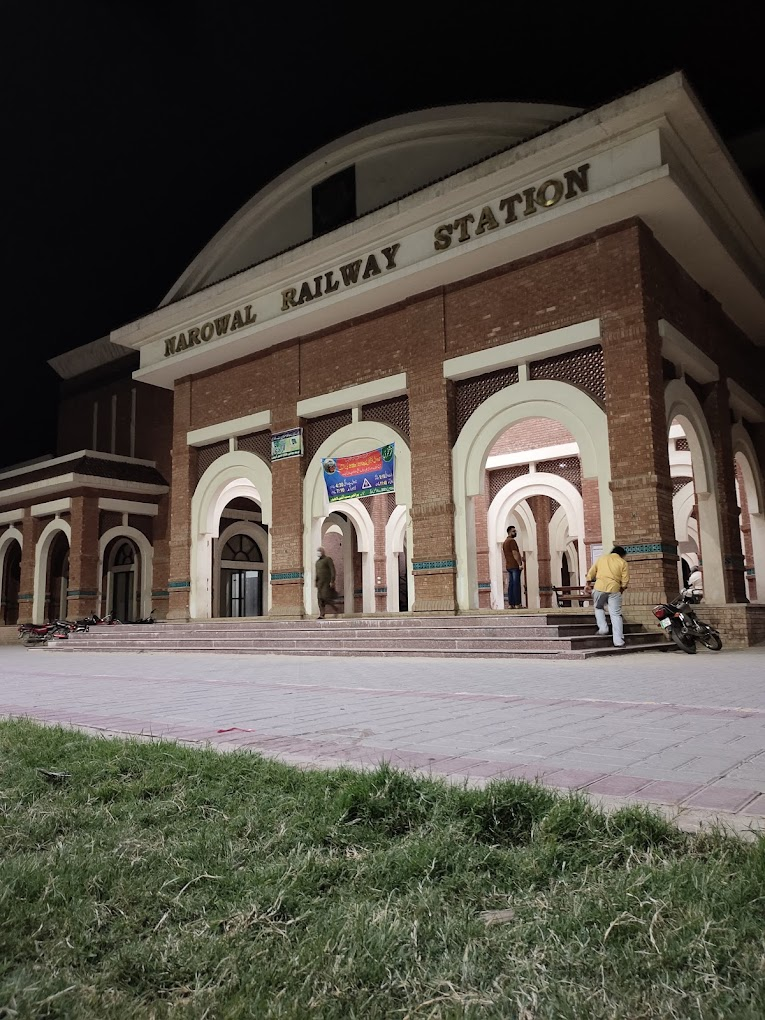

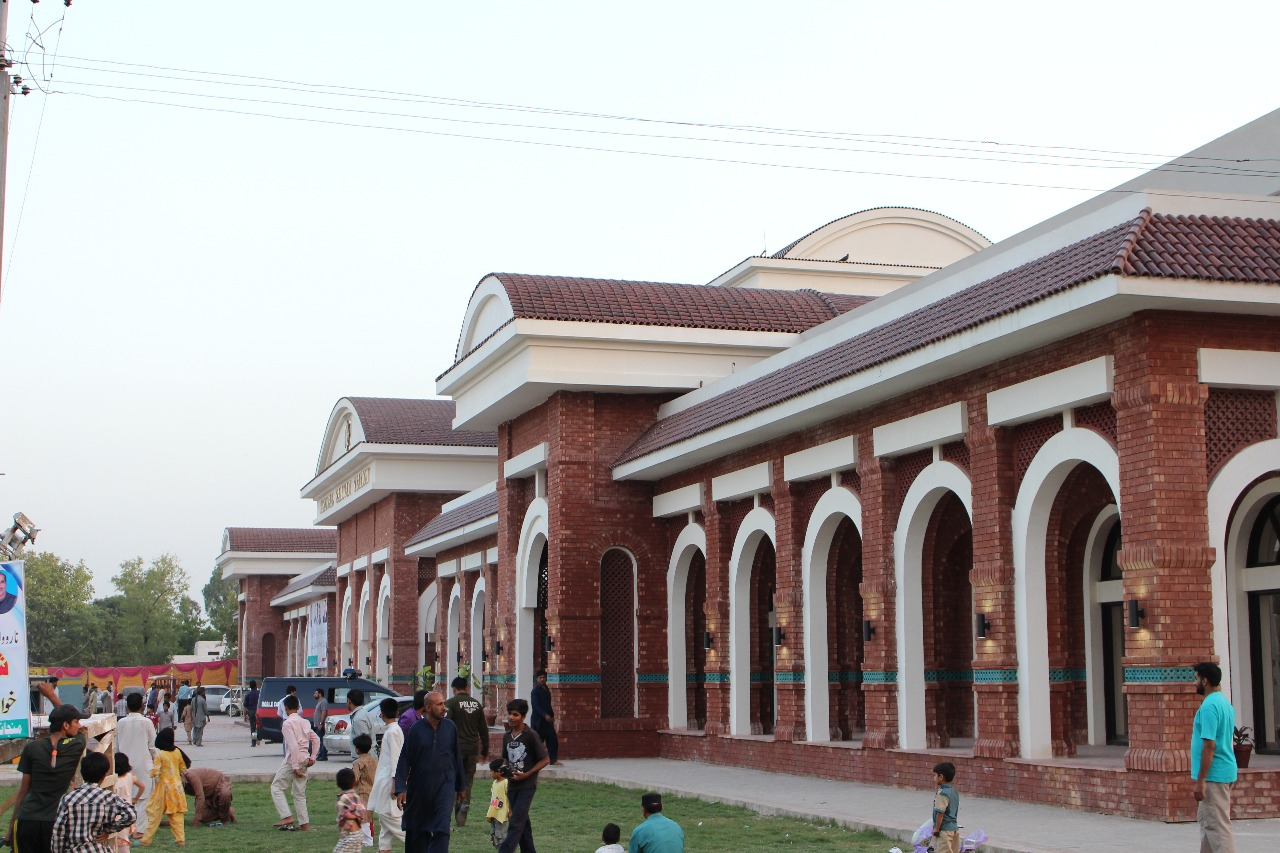
