= Wadhwa =

Indian surname

Wadhwa is a surname of Indian origin and used by the Khatri caste of Punjab. Notable people with the name include:

- Ambika Soni (nee Wadhwa), Indian politician
- Anil Wadhwa (born 1957), Indian bureaucrat
- Anubhav Wadhwa (born 2002), Indian entrepreneur and activist
- Deepak Wadhwa (born 1987), Indian actor
- Gaurav Wadhwa, Indian actor
- Hitendra Wadhwa (born 1967), Indian-American entrepreneur
- Inderpreet Wadhwa (born 1972), Indian-American renewable energy entrepreneur
- Mahendra Lal Wadhwa (1900–1988), Indian revolutionary
- Manish Wadhwa (born 1972), Indian actor
- Meenakshi Wadhwa, American scientist
- Mridul Wadhwa (born 1978), Indian-born Scottish social activist
- Nirbhay Wadhwa, Indian actor
- Rajindar Pal Wadhwa (born 1932), Indian scientist
- Shashi Wadhwa (born 1948), Indian neuroscientist
- Silvia Wadhwa (born 1959), German financial journalist
- Vivek Wadhwa, Indian-American entrepreneur and academic

== See also ==
- Wadhwani
- Wadhawan
