= Kalas Goraya Halt railway station =

Railway station in Punjab, Pakistan

Kalas Goraya Halt Station کلاس گورایا رہالٹ یلوے اسٹیشن

General information
- Owner: Ministry of Railways
- Line: Shahdara Bagh–Chak Amru Branch Line

Other information
- Station code: KGRX

Services
Preceding station	Pakistan Railways	Following station
Pejowali towards Shahdara Bagh Junction	Shahdara Bagh–Chak Amru Branch Line	Narowal Junction towards Chak Amru
Location

Kalas Goraya Halt Railway Station (Urdu: کلاس گورایا رہالٹ یلوے اسٹیشن, Punjabi: کلاس گورایا رہالٹ یلوے اسٹیشن) is located in Kalas Goraya village, Narowal district of Punjab province of the Pakistan.

== See also ==
- List of railway stations in Pakistan
- Pakistan Railways
