= Jassar Junction railway station =

Railway station in Pakistan

Jassar Junction Railway Station جسر جنکشن ریلوے اسٹیشن

General information
- Coordinates: 32.0847°N 74.9496°E
- Owner: Ministry of Railways
- Lines: Narowal–Chak Amru Branch Line; Jassar–Amritsar Branch Line

Other information
- Station code: JSAR

Services
Preceding station	Pakistan Railways	Following station
Narowal Junction towards Shahdara Bagh Junction	Shahdara Bagh–Chak Amru Branch Line	Darbar Sahib Kartar Pur towards Chak Amru
Location

Jassar Junction (Urdu: جسڑ جنکشن; Punjabi: جسڑ جنکشن) is a railway station located in the village of Jassar, in Narowal District of Punjab province, Pakistan.

History

Jassar Junction once served as a key link for nearby rural communities, providing passenger and goods transport to major cities in Punjab. Over time, declining usage and operational changes led to the suspension of all services, leaving the station inactive.

== See also ==
- List of railway stations in Pakistan
- Pakistan Railways
