= Daud railway station =

Railway station in Pakistan

Daud Railway Station داود ہالٹ ریلوے اسٹیشن

General information
- Coordinates: 32.032637°N 74.771223°E
- Owner: Ministry of Railways
- Line: Shahdara Bagh–Chak Amru Branch Line

Services
Preceding station	Pakistan Railways	Following station
Raya Khas towards Shahdara Bagh Junction	Shahdara Bagh–Chak Amru Branch Line	Pejowali towards Chak Amru
Location

Daud Railway Station (Urdu: داود ریلوے اسٹیشن, Punjabi: داود ہالٹ ریلوے اسٹیشن) is located in Daud village, Narowal district of Punjab province, Pakistan.

== See also ==
- List of railway stations in Pakistan
- Pakistan Railways
