= Shah Sultan Halt railway station =

Railway station in Punjab, Pakistan

Shah Sultan Halt Station شاہ سلطان ہالٹ ریلوے اسٹیشن

General information
- Owner: Ministry of Railways
- Line: Shahdara Bagh–Chak Amru Branch Line

Other information
- Station code: SHUA

Services
Preceding station	Pakistan Railways	Following station
Kala Khatai towards Shahdara Bagh Junction	Shahdara Bagh–Chak Amru Branch Line	Narang towards Chak Amru
Location

Shah Sultan Halt Railway Station (Urdu: شاہ سلطان ہالٹ ریلوے اسٹیشن, Punjabi: شاہ سلطان ہالٹ ریلوے اسٹیشن) is located in Shah Sultan village, Sheikhupura district of Punjab province, Pakistan.

== See also ==
- List of railway stations in Pakistan
- Pakistan Railways
