= Babakwal railway station =

Railway station in Punjab, Pakistan

Coordinates: 31°42′N 74°21′E

Bubakwal Railway Station بوبک وال ریلوے اسٹیشن

General information
- Owner: Ministry of Railways
- Line: Shahdara Bagh–Chak Amru Branch Line

Other information
- Station code: BBKW

Services
Preceding station	Pakistan Railways	Following station
Kot Mul Chand towards Shahdara Bagh Junction	Shahdara Bagh–Chak Amru Branch Line	Srirampura towards Chak Amru
Location

Bubakwal Railway Station (Urdu: بابک وال ریلوے اسٹیشن) is located in Sheikhupura District, Pakistan.

== See also ==
- List of railway stations in Pakistan
- Pakistan Railways
