= Alamgir Town Halt railway station =

Railway station in Punjab, Pakistan

Alamgir Town Halt Station عالمگیر ٹاون ہالٹ ریلوے اسٹیشن

General information
- Owner: Ministry of Railways
- Line: Shahdara Bagh–Chak Amru Branch Line

Other information
- Station code: ALRT

Services
Preceding station	Pakistan Railways	Following station
Baddomalhi towards Shahdara Bagh Junction	Shahdara Bagh–Chak Amru Branch Line	Raya Khas towards Chak Amru
Location

Alamgir Town Halt Railway Station (Urdu: عالمگیر ٹاون ہالٹ ریلوے اسٹیشن, Punjabi: عالمگیر ٹاون ہالٹ ریلوے اسٹیشن) is located in Alamgir Town, Narowal district of Punjab province, Pakistan.

== See also ==
- List of railway stations in Pakistan
- Pakistan Railways
