= Khundda Ladheke railway station =

Railway station in Punjab, Pakistan

Khundda Ladheke Railway Station کھنڈا لدھیکے ریلوے اسٹیشن

General information
- Owner: Ministry of Railways
- Line: Shahdara Bagh–Chak Amru Branch Line

Other information
- Station code: KDLE

Services
Preceding station	Pakistan Railways	Following station
Narang towards Shahdara Bagh Junction	Shahdara Bagh–Chak Amru Branch Line	Mehta Suja towards Chak Amru
Location

Khundda Ladheke Railway Station (Urdu: کھنڈا لدھیکے ریلوے اسٹیشن, Punjabi: کھنڈا لدھیکے ریلوے اسٹیشن) is located in Khundda Ladheke village, Sheikhupura district of Punjab province, Pakistan.

== See also ==
- List of railway stations in Pakistan
- Pakistan Railways
