= Kot Mul Chand railway station =

Railway station in Punjab, Pakistan

Kot Mul Chand Railway Station کوٹ مولچند ریلوے اسٹیشن

General information
- Owner: Ministry of Railways
- Line: Shahdara Bagh–Chak Amru Branch Line

Other information
- Station code: KMCD

Services
Preceding station	Pakistan Railways	Following station
Shahdara Bagh Junction Terminus	Shahdara Bagh–Chak Amru Branch Line	Babakwal towards Chak Amru
Location

Kot Mul Chand Railway Station (Urdu: کوٹ مولچند ریلوے اسٹیشن, Punjabi: کوٹ مولچند ریلوے اسٹیشن) is located in the village of Kot Mol Chand, in Sheikhupura district of Pakistan's Punjab province.

== See also ==
- List of railway stations in Pakistan
- Pakistan Railways
