= Man Singh Tyagi =

India academic (1934–2022)

Dr.-Ing Man Singh Tyagi
- मान सिंह त्यागी
- Born: 1 January 1934; Muzaffarnagar, British India
- Died: 6 August 2022 (aged 88); Ghaziabad, India
- Citizenship: Indian
- Education: MSc, Dr. -Ing
- Alma mater: University of Lucknow, India; RWTH Aachen University, Germany
- Occupation: Professor
- Employer(s): 1. CEERI Pilani, India; 2. RWTH Aachen University, Germany; 3. Telefunken AG, Ulm, Germany; 4. University of British Columbia, Canada; 5. Carnegie Mellon University, U.S.A.; 6. Indian Institute of Technology Kanpur, India; 7. Birla Institute of Technology and Science, India; 8. Jaypee Institute of Information Technology, India
- Known for: Semiconductor Devices, Solid state Electronics, Integrated Circuits, Electromagnetics
- Notable work: Author of book : Introduction to Semiconductor Materials and Devices
- Title: Dr.-Ing
- Children: 2

Man Singh Tyagi (1 January 1934 – 6 August 2022), better known as M. S. Tyagi, was an Indian academic who was professor of Electrical Engineering at the Indian Institute of Technology Kanpur.

== Early life and education ==
Born in village Rohana Kalan of the Muzaffarnagar district of the Indian state Uttar Pradesh, Tyagi received his MSc degree in physics from University of Lucknow, India.

== Career ==
Tyagi began his career as a researcher at Central Electronics Engineering Research Institute, Pilani. He then moved to West Germany to pursue his doctorate from RWTH Aachen University. At RWTH, he enrolled his Dr.-Ing (German doctorate degree in engineering) degree in electrical engineering. During his doctorate studies at RWTH, he was employed as a laboratory development engineer by Telefunken AG, Ulm, Germany, from 1962 to 1964. In 1966, he finished his Dr.-Ing degree with his thesis entitled About the breakthrough behaviour of silicon diodes. From 1967 to 1968, he held a postdoctoral teaching fellowship at University of British Columbia, Vancouver, Canada, and during 1968–1969 he was a research scientist at Carnegie Mellon University, Pittsburgh, Pennsylvania, US.

The Indian Institute of Technology Kanpur (IITK) was established in 1959 by a consortium of nine leading US research universities as part of the Kanpur Indo-American Programme (KIAP). In 1969, Tyagi joined the electrical engineering department of IITK as an assistant professor and became a professor in 1977. There he has been mainly responsible for the development of the Semiconductor Devices Laboratory. Since February 1980, he has been a visiting professor in the Department of Electrical Engineering ESAT Laboratory, Katholieke Universiteit Leuven, on leave of absence from IITK. After retiring from IITK as a professor of electrical engineering, he joined the electrical engineering and electronics engineering department of the Birla Institute of Technology and Science, Pilani, as a professor. In July 2003, he joined the electronics and communications engineering department of Jaypee Institute of Information Technology, Noida. He was also a visiting professor at Centre for Development of Advanced Computing, Noida.

== Death ==
Tyagi died in Ghaziabad on 6 August 2022, at the age of 87.

== Books ==
Tyagi wrote one internationally acclaimed book Introduction to Semiconductor Materials and Devices, which is widely used in Electrical Engineering, semiconductor devices and material science undergraduate and postgraduate courses. It was published by John Wiley & Sons on 7 March 1991.

- M. S. Tyagi: Introduction to Semiconductor Materials and Devices. John Wiley & Sons. 311–320 (1991). ISBN 0-471-60560-3
- Physics of Schottky Barrier Junction (first chapter in book Metal-semiconductor Schottky barrier junctions and their applications by B. L. Sharma, PlenumPress, New York (1984))

== Publications ==
Tyagi contributed the first chapter in Metal-semiconductor Schottky barrier junctions and their applications, Plenum Press New York 1984.

== Professional membership ==
Tyagi was a life fellow of IETE, Semiconductor society of India and Indian Society for Technical Education.
