= Ravindra Kumar Sinha (physicist) =

Indian physicist and administrator

Prof. Ravindra Kumar
- Prof. Ravindra Kumar Sinha
- Born: 15 February 1960 (age 66)
- Education: Indian Institute of Technology (IIT) Delhi, Indian Institute of Technology (IIT) Kharagpur
- Known for: Research work on Photonic Crystal Based Nanophotonic Devices including Zero Index Metamaterials for telecom and sensing applications.
- Scientific career
- Thesis: A Study of the Propagation Characteristics of Rectangular Core Optical Waveguides and Devices (1989)
- Website: http://rksinha.in/

Prof. R K Sinha (born 15 February 1960) is an Indian physicist who specializes in Photonic Crystal and Metamaterial based Nanophotonic Devices, fiber optics and photonics. He served as Vice Chancellor of Gautam Buddha University, Greater Noida, Gautam Budh Nagar under Uttar Pradesh Government during January 28, 2022 to Jan 27, 2025. He also served as the Director of the CSIR-Central Scientific Instruments Organisation (CSIR-CSIO) Sector-30C, Chandigarh-160 030, India. He has been as Professor - Applied Physics, Dean-Academic [UG] & Chief Coordinator: TIFAC-Center of Relevance and Excellence in Fiber Optics and Optical Communication, Mission REACH Program, Technology Vision-2020, Govt. of India Delhi Technological University (formerly Delhi College of Engineering, University of Delhi) Bawana Road, Delhi-110042, India since October 2002.

== Early life ==
Prof. Sinha graduated with masters in physics (M.Sc Physics) from Indian Institute of Technology (IIT) Kharagpur in 1984 and moved to Indian Institute of Technology (IIT), Delhi from where he secured a PhD in 1989-90. Topic of his PhD thesis is A Study of the Propagation Characteristics of Rectangular Core Optical Waveguides and Devices under the guidance of Prof Arun Kumar and Prof B.P. Pal in Optical wave guide group headed by Prof. Ajoy Ghatak during the period of 1984-1989.

== Professional career ==
He worked at Osaka University for foreign studies, Osaka and Kobe University in Japan as Japanese government scholar during the period October 1989 - March 1991. Further during April 1991 - December 1992 he has worked as Research Associate in Electrical Communication Engineering Department of Indian Institute of Science (IISc), Bangalore.

He joined as lecturer at Birla Institute of Technology and Science Pilani during January 1992 - September 1994.Thereafter he was assistant professor at Regional Engineering College, now known as National Institute of Technology (NIT) at Hamirpur (H.P.), India during October 17, 1994 - December 30, 1998. Then he joined as assistant professor at Delhi College of Engineering-DCE (Faculty of Technology, University of Delhi) during December 31, 1998 to October 17, 2002 .

He was dean (Industrial Research & Development) at DCE/DTU during August 7, 2008 to August 31, 2010 and head of department of Applied Physics and dean during January 2015 to June 2015 at Delhi Technological University.

He was a chief coordinator: TIFAC-Center of Relevance & Excellence (CORE) in Fiber Optics & Optical Communication at Delhi College of Engineering" under the program "Mission Reach", Technology Vision 2020, Technology Information Forecasting and Assessment Council, Department of Science & Technology, Govt. of India since its inception in year 2005.

He has been a director, CSIR-Central Scientific Instruments Organisation (CSIO) Chandigarh from July 2, 2015 to February 2020. He has also been director, CSIR-Central Electronics Engineering Research Institute (CEERI), Pilani during November 6, 2015 to March 8, 2016 and Director CSIR-Institute of Microbial Technology (IMTECH), Chandigarh since April 11, 2016 to January 22, 2017 as additional charge. His major research area is Fiber Optics and Photonics. His book on Zero Index Metamterials was published in 2021. He has also published a review paper on Supercontinuum Generation using soft glass specialty optical fiber and published book on Supercontinuum Generation in Specialty Optical Fibers (DOIhttps://doi.org/10.1201/9781003502401), CRC Press in 2024.

== Other positions ==
Dr. Sinha is a member of many boards and other organizations. Some of them are:

- Member of BoG of IISER Kolkata
- Senate Member: IIT Delhi
- Senate Member: NIT Delhi
- Governing Body Member of SAU University Delhi
- Chairman: Lamp and Lighting Groups of BIS, Govt of India
- Chairman, Institution of Electronics and Telecommunication Engineers-IETE (India)- Chandigarh Region, Chandigarh
- Member, Board of Governance of PEC University, Chandigarh
- Member, Research Council, LASTECH, DRDO, Delhi
- Member, Management Council, CSIR-National Physical Laboratory (NPL), Delhi
- Member, Executive Board, High Power Fiber Laser Research Program of LASTECH/DRDO
- Member, Higher Educational Council, Union Territory Chandigarh
- Member, Board of Governance, Punjab State Council for Science and Technology
- Member, Board of Governance, Pushpa Gujral Science City, Jallundher
- Member, State Higher Education Council, Chandigarh
- Member, Management Council, CSIR-Central Electro-Chemical Research Institute, Karaikudi, Tamil Nadu
- Member, Management Council of CSIR-Central Glass and Ceramic Research Institute, Kolkata
- Chief Coordinator, TePP (Technopreneur Promotion Program) Outreach cum Cluster Innovation Center at CSIO Chandigarh, DSIR, Govt. of India
- Principal Investigator/Co PI:- Bilateral Research Projects (i) Indo-Russia under DSTRMES program during 2014-2016 on Optical Nano Antenna (ii) Indo-Tunisia during 2013-2016 on Non-Linear Fiber Optics and (iii) Indo-Portugal on Carbon NanoTube during 2014-2016, through International Division, DST, Govt. of India.(iv) Indo-Russia under DST-RFBR program on Novel approaches to control EM waves during 2015-2017 (Awarded while working at DTU and are active as well)
- Principal Investigator/Co PI "Modeling and Simulation of High Power Fiber Lasers" Sponsored Project under Contract for Acquisition of Research Services from LASTEC Lab, DRDO, Govt. of India during 2015-2016. (Awarded while working at DTU)
- Chairman, Organization of Training Program on Management of Scientific Research for Value Creation, CSIR, Delhi, India
- Member, Skill Development Initiative, CSIR, Govt. of India
- Member, Publication Committee of IETE Journal of Research and IETE Technical Review Journal, IETE (India) Delhi since 2016
- Member, Skill Development Program and Indian Industry Conclave committee of IETE (India)
- Member, Technology Systems Development Board, Department of Science and Technology, Govt. of India with effect from December 2016 for a period of three years.
- Expert Member, Faculty of Science, University of Kurukshetra University, Kurukshetra
- Member, Management Council, CSIR-Institute of Microbial Technology, Chandigarh
- Member, Governing Council, Center for Consultancy in Engineering, PEC University of Technology, Chandigarh
- Member: CII National Committee on Higher Education
- Expert Member: National System Safety Regulatory Authority (Brainstorming Session)

== Major Research Work ==
Sinha developed theory and experiments for characterization of telecom grade single mode optical fibers as well as elliptical core fibers for coherent optical communication from measurements of far field radiation patterns. This technique was extended for developing new methods for characterization of single mode integrated planar and rectangular core channel optical waveguides from far field measurements. This was followed by the development of coupled mode theory for design of 4x4 optical fiber and waveguide couplers and their applications in the design of optical homodyne receivers.

Sinha developed the following as well. Development of analytical methods for dispersion compensation of light wave signals using differential time delay technique incorporating the effect of higher orders terms in propagation constant of modes in optical fiber for their application in higher rate of data transmission. Development of a scheme for bit delay correction for WDM based Optical Communication System. Multiple Access techniques in Optical Fiber Communication systems leading to development of 3-D Optical Code sequences. Optical CDMA and Optical Turbo Codes and their performance evaluation in terms of SNR, BER and ISI in optical communication systems.

Development of coupled mode theory for Electron Waveguide and their application in the design of high speed Quantum Size Devices based on electron wave propagation in multiple quantum well semiconductors at Nano-scale was proposed and nano-electronic devices (Electron Waveguide Couplers, Switches and Filters) were designed with enhanced transmission characteristics.

In addition to the above, most of his recent significant research contributions are:

Photonic Crystal based nanophotonic devices: Photonic crystals are periodic dielectric structures that have a band gap that forbids propagation of a certain frequency range of light. This property enables one to control light with amazing facility and produce effects that are impossible with conventional optics. Various new design of photonic crystal made of silicon on insulator (SOI) is proposed for design and development of photonic crystal based coupler, Y splitter, Dual band wavelength multiplexor and de-multiplexors. A new design of Super polarizer is also proposed and its degree of polarization and fabrication tolerance were also estimated. This was followed by the design of photonic crystal structure for slow light generation leading to formation of soliton at incredibly low power, design of Dense Wavelength Division Multiplexor (DWDM) and de-multiplexore for telecom application.

Metamaterials and Negative refraction: A new structure of exhibiting negative refraction (called metamaterial) is designed, analyzed, fabricated and experimentally characterized. This was experimentally realized using V-shaped split ring resonator made up of two-dimensional arrays of 50-nanometer-thick gold on n-doped silicon substrate. It is shown that by changing the angular gap of V-shaped SRRs, it is possible to tune the electromagnetic parameters (such as dielectric permitivity, permeability and refractive index) and control the flow of light for design and development of metamaterial based optical switches and sensors at nano-scale.

In addition, left-handed (metamaterials exhibiting negative refraction) metallo-dielectric photonic crystal exhibiting All Angle Negative Refraction for visible light is analyzed with detailed theoretical and numerical demonstration for the first time. On the same line another new design of left-handed metamaterial structure is analyzed and proposed for generation of ultraviolet light via second harmonic generation. Here, it is shown that negative index is achieved by excitation of Surface Plasmon Polariton waves operating in dispersion regime with anti parallel refracted wave vector and the Poynting vector.

Plasmonics & Plasmonic Bandgap Engineering: Surface Plasmon Polaritons (SPPs) are electromagnetic waves guided along metal dielectric interfaces resulting from the interaction of incident photon with that of collective electron oscillation in metals. SPPs have shorter wavelength than that of incident photons and hence provide strong spatial confinement with promising application in the design and development of sub nano-scale devices. A new concept of Plasmonic Band Gap engineering is highlighted and used for SPP propagation leading to formation of Plasmonic Waveguides. Several types of plasmonic waveguides exhibiting superior propagation characteristics were designed leading to proposal of a new design of Plasmonic Mach-Zhender Interferrometer (PMZI) sensor. It is shown that proposed PMZI has very high sensitivity of the order of 6000 nm/RIU, which has been effectively used for label free classification and detection of cancer cell.

Field Emission characteristics of Carbon Nanotube (CNT) & Nano-Bio Sensors: CNTs were grown using Inconel and silicon substrates and their field emission characteristics have been studied with a view of their promising applications for next generation high performance flat panel devices. Later field emission with ultralow turn on voltage (of the order 0.1 volt/μm) from metal decorated CNTs have been obtained. A single-step method for synthesis and deposition of gold nanostructures was developed for fabrication of a highly sensitive and selective cholesterol nano-biosensor. Using electrochemical synthesis and assembly of gold nanostructures high performance electrochemical biosensor is fabricated which can be utilized for healthcare diagnostic applications.

Photonic Crystal Fiber (PCF) & Supercontinuum generation: Prof. Sinha developed several analytical and numerical techniques for studying light wave propagation characteristics through specially designed photonic crystal fibers and developed experimental techniques for their characterization which have become topic of various text and reference books. Application specific photonic crystal fibers like large mode area PCF and Triangular core PCF were also designed. Very recently, a new design of PCF called Triangular Core Graded Index PCF were designed and analyzed for ultra broad band ( i.e. 2-15 μm, so far highest range) supercontinuum spectrum in mid infrared region.

Professor Ravindra Kumar Sinha, has made a series of original and consequential contributions to the foundations of quantum mechanics, electron wave physics, and photonic device design that span more than three decades of research and teaching.

Correction of de Broglie's Matter Wave Frequency Postulate: The most foundational contributions — developed in collaboration with his student Mr. Himanshu Chauhan and doctoral researcher Dr. Swati Rawal — are the identification and correction of an error in Louis de Broglie's frequency postulate for matter waves that had persisted, unexamined, in every standard textbook on quantum mechanics and modern physics for over one hundred years. De Broglie's original postulate, proposed in 1923, assigned the matter wave frequency to the total relativistic energy of the particle: hν = γmc². Professor Sinha and co-workers demonstrated, in three peer-reviewed publications spanning 2011 to 2013 [1–3], that this expression is physically valid only for photons and cannot be legitimately extended to massive particles. The total relativistic energy γmc² is the sum of the rest energy mc² — present whether the particle moves or not — and the kinetic energy (γ−1)mc², which is zero at rest and increases with velocity. Since de Broglie himself stated explicitly that matter waves arise from the motion of massive particles, the wave frequency must be determined by the energy of motion alone. The rest energy, being dynamically inert, carries no information about the particle's state of motion and plays no physical role in the matter-wave frequency.The corrected frequency expression proposed by his research group is hν = (γ−1)mc² = kinetic energy. This correction is profound in its consequences, resolves three paradoxes that textbooks had acknowledged for a century without resolving:First: Under the original postulate, a stationary electron is assigned a matter wave oscillating at ν₀ = mc²/h = 1.236 × 10²⁰ Hz — a frequency in the hard X-ray range — contradicting de Broglie's own principle. Under the corrected postulate, the rest-frame frequency is zero. Second: The original postulate gives a phase velocity vₚ = c²/υ, which is superluminal for all υ < c and diverges to infinity as the particle slows to rest. Under the corrected postulate, the phase velocity is vₚ = (γ−1)c²/γυ — always sub-luminal, vanishing at rest, approaching c only in the ultra-relativistic limit. The superluminal paradox is eliminated. Third: In the conventional derivation of the Schrödinger equation, the rest energy mc² — introduced through de Broglie's postulate — must be silently discarded as a constant phase factor before the non-relativistic equation can be written.

Snell's Law for Electron Waves and Electron Waveguide Devices In a parallel body of work, Professor Sinha has contributed to the development of electron optics and electron waveguide physics. Extending the formal analogy between electromagnetic wave propagation in optical waveguides and electron wave propagation in semiconductor heterostructures, Professor Sinha formulated and applied the analogue of Snell's Law for electron waves at semiconductor interfaces — governing the refraction of electron matter waves across potential boundaries in a manner directly parallel to the refraction of light at dielectric interfaces. This work established the theoretical basis for the design of electron waveguide-based devices — structures in which the propagation, confinement, and switching of electron waves can be engineered by analogy with established optical waveguide design principles. Such devices exploit the wave nature of electrons in mesoscopic semiconductor systems and have applications in quantum electronic device physics, including electron beam splitters, electron interferometers, and potential components for quantum information processing architectures. The electron waveguide work connects Professor Sinha's foundational interest in quantum mechanics with his primary research area of fiber optics and optical communication, and reflects a sustained programme of applying wave-optical design principles to electron systems. Significance and Recognition: The correction to de Broglie's postulate has been recognised in Jean de Climont's Worldwide List of Alternative Theories and Critics — a catalogue of scientists who have proposed corrections to established physics — as one of the identified alternate theories in quantum mechanics. [1] H. Chauhan, S. Rawal and R. K. Sinha, "Wave-Particle Duality Revitalized: Consequences, Applications and Relativistic Quantum Mechanics," arXiv:1110.4263 (2011). https://arxiv.org/abs/1110.4263 [2] H. Chauhan, S. Rawal and R. K. Sinha, "Wave-particle duality revitalized: Rectifications, verifications, and applications," Physics Essays 26(2), 251–262 (2013). DOI: 10.4006/0836-1398-26.2.251 [3] R. K. Sinha and H. Chauhan, "Inadequacies in de Broglie's theory: Rectifications, verifications and applications," Proc. SPIE 8832, 88321B (2013). DOI: 10.1117/12.2023843
