= Srirampura railway station =

Railway station in Punjab, Pakistan

Srirampura Railway Station سری رام پور ریلوے اسٹیشن

General information
- Coordinates: 31.7413°N 74.3829°E
- Owner: Ministry of Railways
- Line: Shahdara Bagh–Chak Amru Branch Line

Other information
- Station code: SRPA

Services
Preceding station	Pakistan Railways	Following station
Babakwal towards Shahdara Bagh Junction	Shahdara Bagh–Chak Amru Branch Line	Kala Khatai towards Chak Amru
Location

Srirampura Railway Station (Urdu: سری رام پور ریلوے اسٹیشن, Punjabi: سری رام پور ریلوے اسٹیشن) is a railway station located in Srirampura village, Sheikhupura district of Punjab province, Pakistan.

== See also ==
- List of railway stations in Pakistan
- Pakistan Railways
