= Ravindra Kumar Sinha =

Ravindra Kumar Sinha may refer to:

- Ravindra Kumar Sinha (biologist), an Indian biologist, Vice Chancellor for Nalanda Open University
- Ravindra Kumar Sinha (physicist), an Indian physicist, Professor in Applied Physics at Delhi Technological University
