= Nurkot railway station =

Railway station in Punjab, Pakistan

Nurkot Railway Station نورکوٹ ریلوے اسٹیشن

General information
- Coordinates: 32.1980°N 75.1019°E
- Owner: Ministry of Railways
- Line: Shahdara Bagh–Chak Amru Branch Line

Other information
- Station code: NRKT

Services
Preceding station	Pakistan Railways	Following station
Boston Afghanan towards Shahdara Bagh Junction	Shahdara Bagh–Chak Amru Branch Line	Shakargarh towards Chak Amru
Location

Nurkot Railway Station (Urdu: نورکوٹ ریلوے اسٹیشن, Punjabi: نورکوٹ ریلوے اسٹیشن) is located in Nurkot village, Narowal district of Punjab province, Pakistan.

== See also ==
- List of railway stations in Pakistan
- Pakistan Railways
