= Jassar =

Jassar may refer to:

- Jassar, Pakistan, a village near Narowal
- Jassar (surname), a surname
