= Pradip Narayan Ghosh =

Indian physicist

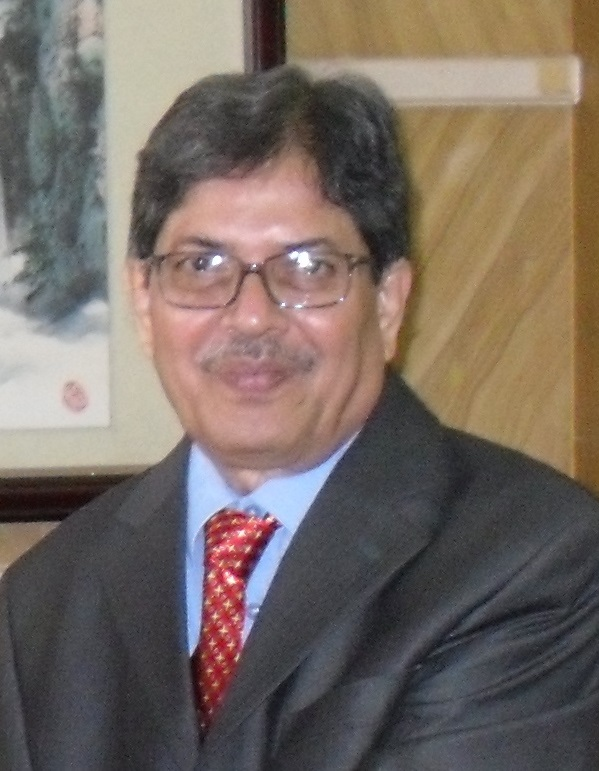
Pradip Narayan Ghosh in 2012

Pradip Narayan Ghosh (born 1948) is an Indian physicist, academic and former Vice-Chancellor of Jadavpur University and Dean of Science of prestigious Rajabazar Science College, University of Calcutta.

== Early life and education ==
He was born in Calcutta in 1948 and is the son of Avarani and Asutosh Ghosh. His grandfather, Atul Krishna Ghosh, was a distinguished lawyer and a political leader.

He graduated from Presidency College, Calcutta and had a Master's and Doctorate degree from the Science College campus of University of Calcutta. He was a post M Sc. research associate of Saha Institute of Nuclear Physics, Calcutta. He earned the Premchand Roychand Scholarship of the University of Calcutta.

== Career ==
He joined Calcutta University as a Lecturer in Physics in 1971 at the age of 23. He has research contributions in the field of Atomic, Molecular and Laser Physics. He introduced the Laser Physics and Application course at the University of Calcutta in the early 1980s.

He has publications on Electromagnetically Induced Transparency. He developed an inexpensive model for laser cooling of atoms, the first such experimental work in a university in India. He was a participant in the European Commission sponsored International Collaborative Project Coherent Optical Sensors for Medical Applications (COSMA) involving nine countries of the world. He worked on this project in Sofia and Siena.

He was a Research Scientist at Swiss Federal Institute of Technology (ETH), Zurich, Fellow of the Alexander von Humboldt Foundation at Ulm, Mainz, Konstanz, Freiburg and Koeln in Germany, Senior Invitation Fellow of JSPS in Japan and a visiting professor at Indiana University.

He published more than hundred and fifteen papers and three books:Laser Physics and Spectroscopy published by Taylor and Francis, in 2018, Physics with Cold Atoms' and Physics Applications

As vice chancellor of Jadavpur University, he established a School of Nuclear Sciences and began a postgraduate course on Nuclear Engineering, the first such course in India. He took the initiative to establish Jadavpur University Press, a publication centre of the University.

He received a Mother Teresa Lifetime Achievement Award for contribution to education. He is the former President of the Indian Physical Society and a founder member of the Indian Association of Physics Teachers.
