= Wadhawan =

Surname list

Wadhawan (also spelled as Wadhavan, Wadhwan, Wadhvan) is a Khatri surname. Among the Khatris, it is a part of the "Bahri" sub-caste. The Wadhawan Khatri community owned several villages in the Gujrat district of West Punjab. Bhai Gurdas, the first Jathedar of Akal Takth, writes about Wadhawan Khatris present in Burhanpur in his Varan.

== Notable people ==
- Anup Wadhawan, Indian bureaucrat and IAS Officer who served as Commerce Secretary to the Government of India
- Avinash Wadhawan (born 1968), Indian actor
- Jatin Wadhwan (born 1994), Indian cricketer
- Kanhaiya Wadhawan (born 2001), Indian cricketer

== See also ==
- Wadhwan, city in Gujarat
- Wadhwa, similar surname
- Wadhwani, similar surname
