= Mr Justice Choudry =

Mr Justice Choudry could refer to:

- Anup Singh Choudry (born 1949), judge of the High Court of Uganda 2008–2014
- Akhlaq Choudhury (born 1967), judge of the High Court of England and Wales since 2017
