= Piara Singh Gill =

Indian physicist

- Piara Singh Gill
- Born: 28 October 1911; Hoshiarpur district, Punjab; British India
- Died: 23 March 2002 (aged 90)
- Education: University of Southern California; University of Chicago
- Known for: Advanced nuclear cosmic ray research. First director of CSIO.
- Scientific career
- Fields: Nuclear physics
- Workplaces: Tata Institute of Fundamental Research; Atomic Energy Commission of India; Aligarh Muslim University; Punjab Agricultural University; University of Chicago; Central Scientific Instruments Organisation
- Doctoral advisor: Arthur Compton

Piara Singh Gill (28 October 1911 – 23 March 2002) was an Indian nuclear physicist and a pioneer in cosmic ray nuclear physics. He was the first director of Central Scientific Instruments Organisation (CSIO) of India. He was research fellow of University of Chicago (1940). He was research Professorship fellow of Tata Institute of Fundamental Research (TIFR) (1947), Officer-on-Special Duty (OSD) with the Atomic Energy Commission in New Delhi. Professor and head of the Department of Physics at Aligarh University (1949), Director of Central Scientific Instruments Organization (CSIO) (1959) and Professor Emeritus at Punjab Agricultural University (1971).

== Education ==
He was born on 28 October 1911 in a Sikh Jat family in a village in Hoshiarpur district of Punjab. He attended Khalsa High School in Mahilpur and left for America in 1929. He graduated with bachelor's and master's degrees from University of Southern California. He worked for his PhD in Physics at University of Chicago under the supervision and guidance of Arthur Compton, the Nobel laureate. He was awarded his PhD in March 1940. He was a good friend and close colleague of Homi J. Bhabha, who offered him the research fellow professorship at Tata Institute of Fundamental Research in 1947.

== Professional life ==
He was a close friend of Nehru, who was impressed by his scientific knowledge. Nehru offered him the post of Officer-on-Special Duty (OSD) with the Atomic Energy Commission in New Delhi and asked him to become the first Director of Central Scientific Instruments Organization (CSIO) of India.

Photo of Professor Piara Singh Gill.

As its director he established CSIO as a leader in advanced scientific instrument design in Asia. Gill was a key advisor to Nehru on India's nuclear weapons strategy in the 1950-60s.

Robert Oppenheimer was a close colleague and friend. Oppenheimer asked Gill to present a paper at the California Institute of Technology at a conference arranged to celebrate the 80th birthday of Professor Robert Millikan, winner of the 1928 Physics Nobel Prize.

== Positions held ==
- Research Fellow, University of Chicago, 1940–41.
- Lecturer in Physics, Forman Christian College, Lahore, 1940–47.
- Professor of Experimental Physics, Tata Institute of Fundamental Research, Bombay, 1947–48.
- Officer-on-special Duty, Atomic Energy Commission, 1948–49.
- Professor and Head, Department of Physics, Aligarh Muslim University, Aligarh, 1949–63.
- Dean, Faculty of Science, Aligarh Muslim University, Aligarh, 1950–53 and 1956–58.
- Director, Gulmarg Research Observatory, Gulmarg, 1951–71.
- Honorary Scientific Adviser to the Government of Punjab.
- Director, Central Scientific Instruments Organization (CSIO), Chandigarh, 1963–71.
- Professor Emeritus, Punjab Agricultural University, 1972–1982.
- Chairman, Universal Magnetics (P) Ltd.
- Adjunct Professor of Physics, Georgia Institute of Technology, Atlanta, Georgia, 1990–1994.

=== Honorary professor of physics ===
- University of Jammu and University of Kashmir.
- Punjab University

== Membership of learned societies ==
- Fellow of the American Physical Society.
- Fellow of the Indian Physical Society.
- Fellow of the National Academy of Sciences of India.
- Fellow of the Indian National Science Academy.
- Fellow of the Explorers Club.

== Positions held in the societies ==
- President of the Physics section of the Indian Science Congress (1954).
- President of the National Academy of Sciences of India (1957–58).
- President of the Indian Physical Society.
- Secretary (Outstation) Indian Science Congress Association (1960–63).
- Foreign Secretary, Indian National Science Academy (1961–64).
- Vice-President, Northern Indian Science Association.
- President, Optical Society of India (1970).

== Membership of learned bodies ==
- Member of the U.P. Scientific Research Committee.
- Member of the U.P. University Grants Committee.
- Member of the Council of the Indian National Science Academy.
- Member of the Council of Indian Physical Society.
- Member of the Council of the National Academy of Sciences of India.
- Member of the Board of Editors of the Indian Journal of Physics.
- Member of the Faculties of the University of Lucknow, Banaras and Allahabad.
- Member of the National Scientific Advisory Council of the Institute of Comprehensive Medicine and also the Editorial Board of the Int. Journal for Comprehensive Medicine, California.
- Member, Panel of Consultants in Technological Sciences and Applied Research to the director-general of UNESCO, 1967.
- Chairman, Development Council for Instruments Industry set up by the Govt. of India, Ministry of Internal Trade and Company Affairs (Department of Industrial Development).
- Member, Senate, Punjab University, Chandigarh.
- Member, Senate, and Syndicate, Punjabi University, Patiala.
- Member, Senate, Guru Nanak Dev University, Amritsar.

== See also ==
- Homi J. Bhabha
