= Kala Khatai railway station =

Railway station in Punjab, Pakistan

Kala Khatai Railway Station کالا کالا خطائی ریلوے اسٹیشن

General information
- Coordinates: 31.8323°N 74.4612°E
- Owner: Ministry of Railways
- Line: Shahdara Bagh–Chak Amru Branch Line

Other information
- Station code: KLKT

History
- Opened: 1926

Services
Preceding station	Pakistan Railways	Following station
Srirampura towards Shahdara Bagh Junction	Shahdara Bagh–Chak Amru Branch Line	Shah Sultan Halt towards Chak Amru
Location

Kala Khatai Railway Station (Urdu: کالا خطائی اسٹیشن, Punjabi: کالا خطائی ریلوے اسٹیشن) is located in Kala Khatai, Sheikhupura district of Punjab province, Pakistan.

== See also ==
- List of railway stations in Pakistan
- Pakistan Railways
