= Raya Khas railway station =

Railway station in Punjab, Pakistan

Raya Khas Railway Station رعیہ خاص ریلوے اسٹیشن

General information
- Coordinates: 32.0147°N 74.7333°E
- Owner: Ministry of Railways
- Line: Shahdara Bagh–Chak Amru Branch Line

Other information
- Station code: RKHS

Services
Preceding station	Pakistan Railways	Following station
Alamgir Town Halt towards Shahdara Bagh Junction	Shahdara Bagh–Chak Amru Branch Line	Daud Halt towards Chak Amru
Location

Raya Khas Railway Station (Urdu: رعیہ خاص ریلوے اسٹیشن, Punjabi: رعیہ خاص ریلوے اسٹیشن) is located in Raya Khas village, Narowal district of Punjab province of the Pakistan.

== See also ==
- List of railway stations in Pakistan
- Pakistan Railways
