= St. Joseph's College Layibi =

Ugandan school

Location
- Gulu, Gulu District; Uganda
- Coordinates: 02°44′25″N 32°17′53″E

Information
- Type: Public middle school and high school (8–13)
- Motto: "Melius Atque Utilius"
- Religious affiliation: Catholic Church
- Established: January 1, 1953; 73 years ago
- Founder: Verona Fathers
- Deputy Headteacher: Alex Onen
- Athletics: Rugby, football, track, tennis, volleyball, basketball
- Nickname: "Techo Parish"
- Publication: "The Clarion"
- Website: Homepage

St. Joseph's College Layibi is a boys-only boarding middle and high school located in the city of Gulu, Gulu District in the Northern Region of Uganda.

== Location ==
The school campus is situated on in Layibi Parish, in the city of Gulu, the largest city in the Northern Region of Uganda. The school sits along the Gulu–Kampala Highway, approximately 329 kilometres (204 mi), by road, north of Kampala, Uganda's capital and largest city. The geographical coordinates of St. Joseph's College Layibi are:2°44'25.0"N, 32°17'53.0"E (Latitude:2.740278; Longitude:32.298056).

== Overview ==
The school was founded in 1953 by the Verona Fathers, an Italy-based Catholic missionary society, "to produce first-class intellectuals with good Christian values, technical excellence and sportsmanship". An all-boys technical institution, Layibi emphasizes trade courses that include motor vehicle mechanics, carpentry and bricklaying.

From its inception Layibi College was founded as a technical school by the Verona Fathers also known as Comboni Fathers, with courses including bricklaying, carpentry and motor vehicle mechanics. Initial annual intake was 60 students. Between 1959 and 1988 purely technical courses were offered at O-Level and A-Level, but were discontinued in 1988.

== Reputation ==
In the 2000s the school was earmarked as a "Centre for Excellence" by the Uganda Ministry of Education and Sports. In 2012 it was upgraded to a "Comprehensive Secondary School".

== Prominent alumni ==
Former students of St. Joseph's College Layibi, include the Deputy Speaker of the Parliament of Uganda, a member of parliament, several engineers, doctors and sportsmen. Some of the prominent alumni of the school include:

- Anup Singh Choudry: Writer and judge.
- late Jacob Oulanyah: Lawyer and politician. Deputy Speaker of the Parliament of Uganda, 2011 - 2023.
- Odonga Otto: Lawyer and politician. Member of Parliament, representing Aruu County, Pader District, in the Northern Region of Uganda.

== See also ==
- Education in Uganda
