= Mehta Suja railway station =

Railway station in Punjab, Pakistan

Mehta Suja Railway Station مہتہ سوجا ریلوے اسٹیشن

General information
- Coordinates: 31.9645°N 74.6060°E
- Owner: Ministry of Railways
- Line: Shahdara Bagh–Chak Amru Branch Line
- Platforms: 1
- Tracks: 2

Construction
- Structure type: British Era
- Platform levels: 1

Other information
- Station code: MSJ

Services
Preceding station	Pakistan Railways	Following station
Khundda Ladheke towards Shahdara Bagh Junction	Shahdara Bagh–Chak Amru Branch Line	Baddomalhi towards Chak Amru
Location

Mehta Suja Railway Station (Urdu: مہتہ سوجا ریلوے اسٹیشن, Punjabi: مہتہ سوجا ریلوے اسٹیشن) is located in Mehta Suja village, Sheikhupura district of Punjab province of Pakistan.

== Mehta Suja ==
Mehta Suja is an old village and according to History its roots date back to the Mughal era. According to the 2017 census, the village is home to around 4000 people. The village has a diversified population and strong caste system in place. Common castes in the village include Jatt, Jolaha, Kumhar, Mistri, Changar, Faqeer, Merasi, Qasab, Mochi. This village also has some Christian population .The Jatt sub caste of residents is called 'Sivia Jatt (Jutt). The village is located near the Indo-Pakistan border. Notable people include Ch. Muhammad Safdar, Lt.Gen Rtd Hamid Nawaz Khan, Col. Haq Nawaz, Ch Javaid Iqbal Sivia( chairman), Ch Jamshaid Tariq Sivia (Govt Officer) .Mehta Suja village has an old Building Previously used as Guest Rooms by Irrigation Department .BRB Canal flows along the village and gives this village a great importance with respect to agriculture and Defense . Old name of village was Mehta Sivia after two castes of Jatt Clan Mehta and Sivia Respectively later changed to Mehta Suja.

== See also ==
- List of railway stations in Pakistan
- Pakistan Railways
