= Baddomalhi railway station =

Railway station in Punjab, Pakistan

Baddomalhi Railway Station بدوملہی ریلوے اسٹیشن

General information
- Coordinates: 31.9841°N 74.6575°E
- Owner: Ministry of Railways
- Line: Shahdara Bagh–Chak Amru Branch Line
- Platforms: 2
- Tracks: 2

Other information
- Station code: BDML

Services
Preceding station	Pakistan Railways	Following station
Mehta Suja towards Shahdara Bagh Junction	Shahdara Bagh–Chak Amru Branch Line	Alamgir Town Halt towards Chak Amru
Location

Baddomalhi Railway Station (Urdu & Punjabi: بدوملہی ریلوے اسٹیشن) is located in Baddomalhi city, Narowal District of Punjab province, Pakistan. It serves the local population by providing rail connectivity to nearby towns and cities within the region.

== Significance ==
Baddomalhi Railway Station holds strategic importance as it is located on the main railway line connecting Lahore to Narowal. Trains traveling to and from Narowal regularly pass through this station, making it a vital link for passengers in the region. Its active operations help maintain connectivity between rural areas and major urban centers, supporting both travel and local commerce.

== See also ==
- List of railway stations in Pakistan
- Pakistan Railways
