= Azure Power =

Indian renewable energy company

Azure Power Global Limited
- Company type: Public
- Traded as: OTC Pink: AZREF
- ISIN: MU0527S00004
- Industry: Solar energy
- Founded: 2008; 18 years ago
- Headquarters: New Delhi, Delhi, India
- Area served: India
- Key people: Sunil Gupta (CEO); R Narasimhan Iyer (COO); Sugata Sircar (Group CFO)
- Revenue: ₹12,958 million (US$171.9 million) (FY 2019-20)
- Operating income: ₹7,962 million (105.6 million) (FY 2019-20)
- Number of employees: 656 (2019)

Azure Power Global Limited is an Indian solar power company, headquartered in New Delhi, India. The company was founded in 2008 by Inderpreet Wadhwa. The company sells energy to government utilities, and independent industrial and commercial customers in India.

== History ==
The company was founded by Inderpreet Wadhwa in 2008. Azure Power’s 2 MW Punjab facility was the first utility-scale solar power plant in India in 2009. Azure Power developed India's first utility scale solar project in 2009 in Awan, Punjab. Azure Power has a total capacity of more than 7 GW.

The project provides electricity to 32 villages 20,000 people in Awan, Punjab. Azure Power has raised capital from investors like Foundation Capital, Helion Ventures, IFC and German development bank DEG. The company's largest shareholder is Caisse de dépôt et placement du Québec (also known as CDPQ), which owns over 50% of the shares outstanding. Azure Power has a total capacity of over 7.2 GW across.

== Technology ==
In November 2011, Azure Power was awarded the US Department of Commerce’s Export Achievement Certificate, at SolarCon, Hyderabad. In August 2012, Hanwha Q Cells Co., the South Korean solar panel manufacturer, tied up with Azure Power to invest and build a Solar Plant in India to generate enough electricity to supply 18,000 homes. In 2014, Azure Power selected Accenture to implement an SAP enterprise resource planning (ERP) solution to support and drive growth in its solar generation business. As part of the agreement, Accenture provides implementation services in support of the SAP solution to Azure Power to help strengthen its business processes and improve planning, budgeting, forecasting, supply chain and revenue projections.

== See also ==
- Solar power in India
- Solar Energy Corporation of India
- Tata Power Solar
