= Rajindar Pal Wadhwa =

Indian engineer (born 1932)

- Born: 3 September 1932 (age 94); India
- Education: Indian Institute of Science
- Known for: Studies on Microwave Engineering and Vacuum Devices
- Awards: 1972 Shanti Swarup Bhatnagar Prize; 1980 J. C. Bose Memorial Award
- Scientific career
- Fields: Microwave engineering
- Workplaces: Bharat Electronics Limited; CEERI; National Physical Laboratory

Rajindar Pal Wadhwa (born 3 September 1932) is an Indian engineer, microwave technologist and a former deputy general manager of Bharat Electronics Limited. He is also a former deputy director of the Central Electronics Engineering Research Institute (CEERI) and the National Physical Laboratory of India and is known for his studies on Microwave Engineering and Vacuum Devices. The Council of Scientific and Industrial Research, the apex agency of the Government of India for scientific research, awarded him the Shanti Swarup Bhatnagar Prize for Science and Technology, one of the highest Indian science awards for his contributions to Engineering Sciences in 1972.

== Biography ==
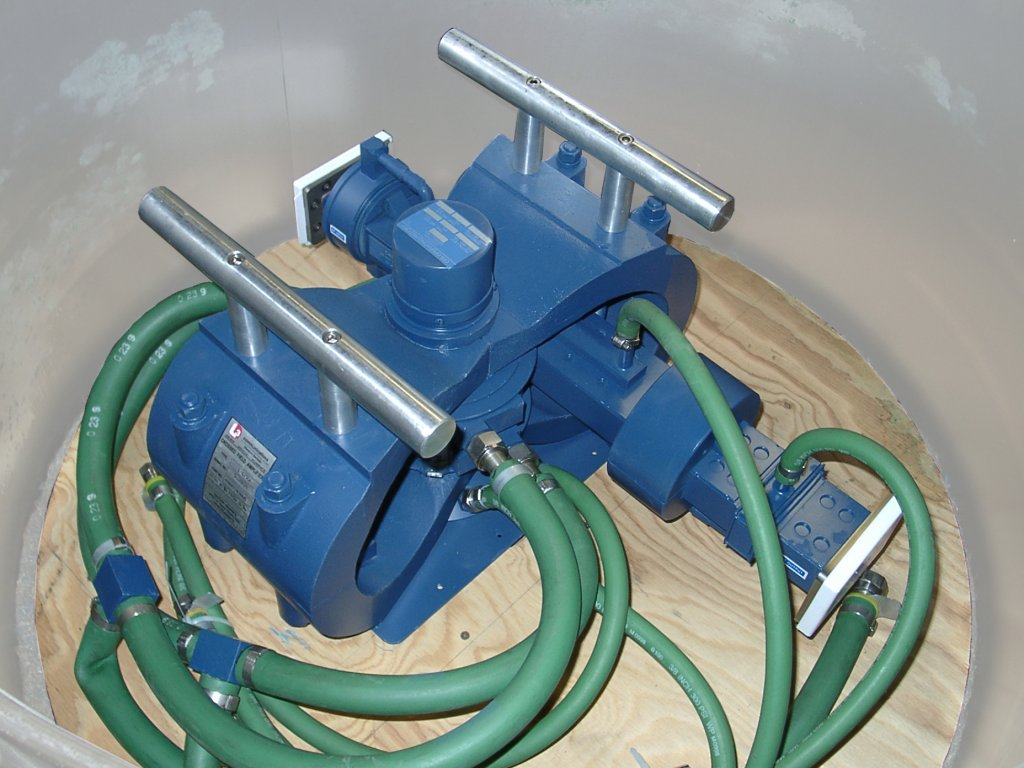
A water-cooled cross-field amplifier

R. P. Wadhwa, born on 3 September 1932, secured a PhD from Indian Institute of Science in 1955 and started his career at Central Electronics Engineering Research Institute (CEERI) but moved to the US in 1956. In US, he worked at Rensselaer Polytechnic Institute as a graduate teaching assistant (1956–58), at EBSCO Information Services as a junior engineer (1957), at IBM and as Engineer (1958–59), at University of Michigan as a research engineer (1959–63), at Litton Industries as a senior engineer (1963–66) and also had a short stint at University of California Extension Service as a part-time teacher. Returning to India in 1966, he resumed his career at CEERI as an assistant director. He served CEERI till 1970 when he was appointed as the deputy general manager of Bharat Electronics Limited and in 1978, he joined the National Physical Laboratory of India as the deputy director, scientist (Grade-F) and the head of the Test Evaluation and Calibration Centre. He has also served as the member secretary of the Research Advisory Council of NPL and as the project leader of the Carcinotron Project, a joint venture of CEERI and UNESCO.

Wadhwa is known to have done extensive research in the fields of Indicator, X-ray, TV and transmitting tubes as well as crossed field devices, especially on 3.5-dB Noise Figure Crossed-field amplifier. He has documented his researches by way of a number of articles and several authors have cited his work. He holds three patents and has delivered several keynote addresses and invited speeches. He has also mentored several masters and doctoral scholars in their studies. A former vice president and president of the Indian Vacuum Society and an Information Technology Advisor to NTCS Technology Consulting Services, he is a fellow of the Institution of Electronics and Telecommunication Engineers. The Council of Scientific and Industrial Research awarded him the Shanti Swarup Bhatnagar Prize, one of the highest Indian science awards in 1972 and he received the J. C. Bose Memorial Award in 1980.

== See also ==
- Vacuum tubes
