= Pejowali railway station =

Railway station in Punjab, Pakistan

Coordinates: 32°03′N 74°48′E

Pejowali Railway Station پیجووالی ریلوے اسٹیشن
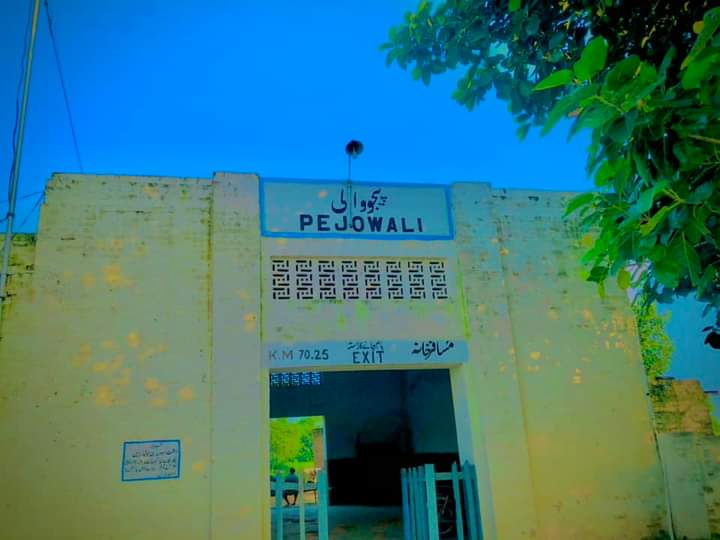

General information
- Owner: Ministry of Railways
- Line: Shahdara Bagh–Chak Amru Branch Line

Other information
- Station code: PJWL

Services
| Preceding station | Pakistan Railways | Following station |
|---|---|---|
| Daud Halt towards Shahdara Bagh Junction | Shahdara Bagh–Chak Amru Branch Line | Kalas Goraya Halt towards Chak Amru |
Location

Pejowali Railway Station (Urdu: پیجووالی ریلوے اسٹیشن; Punjabi: پیجووالی ریلوے اسٹیشن) is a railway station located in the village of Pejowali, within the Narowal District of Punjab province, Pakistan.

Train Services:

Several passenger services operate through Pejowali Railway Station, including:

- Faiz Ahmed Faiz Passenger (209UP/210DN) Operates between Lahore Junction and Narowal Junction, stopping at Pejowali for boarding and alighting.
- Lasani Express (125UP/126DN) – Runs between Lahore and Sialkot, with a scheduled halt at Pejowali.
- Narowal Passenger (211UP/212DN) – Connects Lahore to Narowal, including Pejowali as one of its intermediate stops.

Significance:

Pejowali Railway Station serves as an important transit point for the surrounding rural communities, providing direct connectivity to major urban centres such as Lahore and Sialkot. The station supports both passenger travel and small-scale goods transportation, contributing to regional mobility and local commerce.

== See also ==
- List of railway stations in Pakistan
- Pakistan Railways
- Narowal District
