= Narang railway station =

Railway station in Punjab, Pakistan

Narang Railway Station نارنگ ریلوے اسٹیشن

General information
- Coordinates: 31.9034°N 74.5164°E
- Owner: Ministry of Railways
- Line: Shahdara Bagh–Chak Amru Branch Line
- Platforms: 2
- Tracks: 3

Other information
- Station code: NRNG

Services
Preceding station	Pakistan Railways	Following station
Shah Sultan Halt towards Shahdara Bagh Junction	Shahdara Bagh–Chak Amru Branch Line	Khundda Ladheke towards Chak Amru
Location

Narang Railway Station (Urdu: نارنگ ریلوے اسٹیشن, Punjabi: نارنگ ریلوے اسٹیشن) is located in Narang city, Sheikhupura district of Punjab province, Pakistan.

== See also ==
- List of railway stations in Pakistan
- Pakistan Railways
