= Jassar (surname) =

Jassar is a surname. Notable people with the surname include:

- Salwa al-Jassar, Kuwaiti politician
- Tarsem Jassar (born 1986), Punjabi lyricist, singer, and producer
- Wael Jassar (born 1976), Lebanese singer

Jassar is a jatt surname in Punjab India.

== See also ==
- Jassar
- Nassar
