= Central Scientific Instruments Organisation =

Indian research laboratory

CSIR-Central Scientific Instruments Organisation
- Established: 1959 in New Delhi, Relocated to Chandigarh in 1962
- Director: Prof. Shantanu Bhattacharya
- Location: Sector 30-C, Chandigarh, India-160030
- Website: www.csio.res.in

The Central Scientific Instruments Organisation is a Chandigarh, India-based national laboratory dedicated to research, design and development of scientific, and industrial instruments. It is one of the constituent laboratories of the Council of Scientific and Industrial Research (CSIR), an Indian industrial research and development organisation situated at Chandigarh's Sector 30-C.

== Overview ==
CSIO was established in October 1959 as a laboratory that works on the research, design, and development of scientific and industrial instruments. It was originally located in New Delhi, and then moved to Chandigarh in 1962. The first Director was Piara Singh Gill. CSIO campus (spread over an area of approximately 120 acres) comprises office buildings, R&D laboratories, the Indo-Swiss Training Centre and a housing complex. A building and the accompanying workshops were inaugurated in December 1967. Another block was added in 1976 for housing the R&D Divisions and library. During the mid-1980s the laboratory buildings and infrastructural facilities were modernized. An Administration Block was inaugurated in September 1994.

With a view of meeting the demand for instrument technologists, the Indo-Swiss Training Centre (ISTC) was founded in December 1963 with the cooperation of the Swiss Foundation for Technical Assistance, Zurich, Switzerland (see below).

CSIO is under the Physical Sciences Cluster of CSIR. CSIR-CSIO signed an MoU with CSIR-IMTECH Chandigarh on 28 April 2012 for collaborative research work.

CSIO has infrastructural facilities in the areas of microelectronics, optics, applied physics, electronics, and mechanical engineering. There are also R&D programmes for food & agriculture, health and rehabilitation, avionics, snow and seismic monitoring in the strategic sector, landslide and structure health monitoring for public safety, and bio and nanosciences.

A large number of instruments have been developed by the institute and their know-how has been passed on to the industry for commercial exploitation.

The laboratory provides a two-year postgraduate research programme in Engineering (PGRPE) in "Advanced Instrumentation Engineering" the only such program in India. The students are designated as Quick Hire Scientist Trainee QHS(T)in either Optics and Photonics, or Bio-Medical Instrumentation and Agrionics. After the completion of a 1-year course taught by the senior scientists of the organization, they are given a 1-year project to work on as their thesis.

== Campus ==
CSIO campus is situated on the Ambala-Chandigarh highway which houses the laboratories and workshops, Indo-Swiss Training Centre (ISTC) and residential complex. Amenities on campus include the Clinical Centre, Crèche, Community Centre, Health Club and Adult Park. 250 dwelling units are provided for employees, and a hostel is available for students from engineering institutions and universities undergoing their thesis, project, or training. A guest-house on campus with 16 rooms is also available. A canteen facility exists for all employees and students.

The vacant Type-I accommodation in the campus is being renovated with a provision for the internet facility for accommodating the Scientist Trainees and a 50-room hostel is proposed to be constructed for them. Dining and Common Room facilities would be provided for Scientist Trainees.

== Laboratories ==
CSIO has labs engaged in R&D programmes of the institute. A number of these labs and facilities have been earmarked for carrying out research/project/thesis of MTech/PhD level scholars. They can accommodate an additional 3-5 Scientist Trainees each, while a similar number are allowed from other institutions. Three basic (common to all streams) labs exist (catering to MTech (Mechatraonics) students), with an additional two labs being easily configurable for related R&D groups.

In all three departments for the chosen streams, sitting space for accommodating the Scientist Trainees is being created with office amenities including computer, internet, printing, phone or fax facility. The CSIO's IT cell would extend the services to the Scientist Trainees. Similarly, administrative requirements including national travel and outstation stay/accommodation of the TSs would be met initially by the existing CSIO establishments till independent arrangements are made. The Scientist Trainees would be considered as team members for international collaborations and funds for fees/travel/etc would be sought from different sources including CSIO/CSIR and other government funding schemes.

== Library ==
CSIO library has a seating capacity of about 40 persons and has 50,000 books and standards covering science, engineering, technology, management and multidisciplinary areas. 92 journals are subscribed by the library and there is access to 2000 online e-journals within the campus. The library has arrangements with other local institutions as well as the National Institute of Science Communication and Information Resources (NISCAIR) for the emergent requirement of literature and books.

== Faculty ==
CSIO has been playing a role in human resource development in terms of running MTech (Instrumentation) affiliated to Panjab University (PU), Chandigarh which was initiated at CSIO in 1994 and was run by the CSIO faculty using internal laboratory facilities for three consecutive years before it was shifted to PU. The scientists here were also involved in the conception, design and implementation of another programme [MTech (Microelectronics)] programme in 1998 in association with Semiconductor Complex Ltd (now called Semiconductor Laboratory), Mohali (Pb) being run by PU, Chandigarh. Another Masters programme [MTech(Nanosciences)] has been initiated in 2006 in PU, Chandigarh.

CSIO has jointly initiated an MTech (Mechatronics) programme with Central Mechanical Engineering Research Institute (CMERI), Durgapur and Central Electronics Engineering Research Institute (CEERI), Pilani in affiliation with Indian Institute of Engineering Science and Technology, Shibpur, Kolkata formerly known as Bengal Engineering Science University (BESU). This programme is run jointly by the faculty of all the four institutions involved.

Scientists supervise project training and thesis work of a large number of B.Tech and MTech students respectively. A number of Junior Research Fellows (JRFs) and Senior Research Fellows (SRFs) pursue their research work at CSIO for MTech/PhD.

CSIO has MoUs with universities, institutions and industries resulting in a regular flow of students and research problems. CSIO scientists are members of Boards of Studies (BoSs) and Research Degree Committees (RDCs) of universities and institutions. Scientists have been identified to serve as faculty at CSIO Chandigarh. They comprise PhDs and MTechs and some of them are pursuing their PhD. All are MTechs and PhDs from institutions such as IITs, BITS, and NITs. Some of them have gained experience as post-doctorates from abroad.

International research publications have emanated from the research work carried out by the scientists. About a dozen PhDs have been supervised by some of the senior faculty members in the last decade while currently more than 20 PhDs and about 35 MTech students are pursuing their thesis. The January session in 2011 attracted the registration of six PhDs in the organisation in both science and engineering. In the last few years, more than 50 patents have been filed by them and granted while many are under process.

== Major R&D areas ==
- Strategic and Defence Applications
- Optics & Opto-Electronics
- Holography and displays
- Computational Instrumentation
- Geo-Scientific Instrumentation
- Medical Instrumentation
- Analytical Instrumentation
- Agri-Electronic Instrumentation
- Energy Management, Condition Monitoring & Quality Control
- Environmental Monitoring Instrumentation
- Microelectro Mechanical Systems (MEMS) and Sensors
- Biomolecular Electronics and Nanotechnology

== Departments ==
=== Verticals ===
- Agrionics
- Bio-Medical Instrumentation
- Optical Devices & Systems
- Advanced Materials & Sensors
- Precision Mechanical Systems

=== Horizontals ===
- Ubiquitous Analytical Techniques and R&D Support Facilities
- Computational Instrumentation
- Human Resource Development
- Knowledge Resource Management
- Engineering Services

== Courses ==
A degree in the following courses is offered by the Academy of Scientific and Innovative Research (AcSIR).

- PhD in Engineering - a master's degree in Engineering/Technology/Pharmacy with a good academic record who have secured master's degree admission based on GATE score or valid CSIR-SRF or equivalent fellowship.
- PhD in Science - candidates with master's degree in Science or bachelor's degree in Engineering or Medicine having a National level fellowship (JRF/SRF of funding agencies), INSPIRE or other equivalent fellowships.
- Integrated M.Tech. and PhD in Engineering (formerly, Postgraduate Research Programme in Engineering (PGRPE)) - AcSIR admits candidates into the five-year integrated M. Tech and PhD Program. Candidates do have an exit option after completion of M.Tech. part of the program.

== Indo-Swiss Training Centre ==
Jawaharlal Nehru speaking at the inauguration of the Indo-Swiss Training Centre, 18 December 1963

The Indo-Swiss Training Centre (ISTC), on the CSIO campus, trains technicians in precision engineering. It was set up under a 1961 agreement between CSIR and the Swiss Foundation for Technical Assistance (later Swisscontact), which designed its workshop on the Swiss vocational school model and supplied machines and three instructors. The first course, which began in 1962, had 36 trainees selected from about 1,400 applicants. Prime Minister Jawaharlal Nehru formally inaugurated the centre on 18 December 1963. The Swiss agreement was not renewed after 31 August 1968, and CSIO has since run the centre with Indian staff.

As of 2026 ISTC offered four programmes approved by the All India Council for Technical Education for students who have passed Class 10: three-year diplomas in mechanical engineering (tool and die) and in electronics engineering, and four-year advanced diplomas in die and mould making and in mechatronics and industrial automation. Training is workshop-based. At the centre's 59th convocation in August 2024, 101 students received diplomas.

== Programmes and Workshops ==
Starting in the year 2014, Faculty development motivational programme for Government schools has been started. CSIO has adopted a government school to provide the knowledge and promoting science to the faculties as well as students.
