= Swisscontact =

Swiss non-profit organisation

Swisscontact – Swiss Foundation for Technical Cooperation is a Swiss non-profit-organisation, which carries out projects aiming at reducing poverty in developing and transition countries by private sector development. It has been founded in 1959 as a politically and denominationally neutral organisation and has 60 employees in Switzerland and approximately 1,400 staff abroad. The main fields of activity are fostering skills development, small and medium enterprises, financial services and resource efficiency.

== History ==
The aim of all of Swisscontact's activities is to reduce poverty by private sector development.

Swisscontact was founded in 1959 under the name of Swiss Foundation for Technical Cooperation by leading figures from the Swiss business world, universities and politics. The first initiative came from Anne-Marie Im Hof-Piguet (1916-2010), who was of the opinion "that because of its wealth and as country without a colonial past, Switzerland should play an important role in development aid".

In the 1960s, Swisscontact set up vocational training colleges in Africa, Asia and Latin America and provided further training for the instructors at these colleges. The first of these, a school for precision engineering in Chandigarh, India, opened in 1962 and became the Indo-Swiss Training Centre, which Prime Minister Jawaharlal Nehru inaugurated in December 1963. This was followed in the 1980s by the launch of schemes aimed at promoting small and medium enterprises (SMEs), after graduates from the vocational training colleges had said that there was an urgent need for expert advice when setting up businesses. It was also evident that SMEs were experiencing considerable difficulty in obtaining commercial and investment credits. As a result, the organization introduced programmes favouring the creation of micro-finance institutions. After training car mechanics, Swisscontact also went on to develop integral solutions for preventing air pollution.

The organization was renamed in 1972, but retained its old title as a supplement.

== Organisation ==
Swisscontact has approximately 1,100 staff worldwide. It carries out around 120 projects in 39 different countries to promote economic stability. The board of trustees consists of about 30 people from the business world, university and politics.

Swisscontact is specialized in project implementation, accepts assignments from public and private partners and carries out projects that have been put out to public tender. The organization also runs a programme of its own activities that are financed from donations and contributions from the state.

The foundation with headquarters in Zurich, Switzerland, is certified with the ZEWO seal of quality from the Swiss agency responsible for monitoring charitable organizations that raise donations in Switzerland. Two important partners of Swisscontact are the governmental organisations Swiss Agency for Development and Cooperation (SDC) and the State Secretariat for Economic Affairs (SECO).

Since 2019, Springfield Centre, Durham (GB), has been a subsidiary of Swisscontact. The Springfield Centre is a consulting, training and research company focused on market systems development.

== Topical priorities ==
Swisscontact states that employment and income open up pathways out of poverty and can reduce economic disparities. The private sector strengthens weak regions and enables disadvantaged groups to become market participators.

All activities of Swisscontact can be divided into four areas of operation:

=== Skills development ===
Since 1959 Swisscontact has been committed to providing vocational training and further education, the assumption being that professional competence is the key to the economic and social development of a country. Swisscontact started off by setting up technical vocational training colleges (for mechanics, electricians, electronic technicians, etc.) based on the Swiss model in countries where infrastructure was lacking. Over the past 25 years the main focus in the promotion of vocational training has shifted to instructing vocational training college instructors and setting up national vocational training systems on the one hand and to holding shorter courses on the other, in particular for unemployed youngsters and disadvantaged sectors of the population (in development cooperation usually called «skills training»). In simple basic courses, they can acquire knowledge that will give them the chance to find a job or become self-employed. Emphasis is always placed on getting as many women as possible involved in the schemes. At present, around 45% of those who have benefited are women.

Swisscontact supports practical vocational training by:

- Vocational education and training: Swisscontact works locally through existing institutions and training centres, usually by training teachers and instructors or with the establishment of teacher training institutes.
- Labor market insertion: This includes instruments like counseling, placement services, work programmes, employment incentives, internships, occupational and life skills training, start-up incentives.

=== Enterprise promotion ===
Small and medium enterprises (SMEs) are the largest employers in developing countries as well. Swisscontact aims at strengthening the competitiveness of small and medium-sized businesses. The organisation's market system development approach, referred to as Inclusive Markets addresses the constraints and opportunities of markets for disadvantaged people.

To make markets more inclusive, Swisscontact refers to three different approaches:

- Value chain development: This approach focuses on a certain sector with growth potential. It supports small businesses, especially farmer organisations, to establish themselves as suppliers in national and global value chains by training and technical assistance or quality management.
- Regional and local economic development: In cases where geographic isolation is the primary constraint, the specific local development potential is taken as a starting point.
- Entrepreneurship: Swisscontact supports innovative, risk-oriented individuals to seize business opportunities by facilitating business enabling environments, access to financial services and to non-financial resources such as information and know-how.

In practice, these approaches are often combined.

=== Inclusive finance ===
In development cooperation, all financial services provided for people on low incomes in developing countries are bracketed together under the collective term microfinance. Their aim is to give small and medium enterprises access to banking services that allow them to maintain or expand their companies. Swisscontact does not grant microcredits, but instead assists local microcredit banks, insurance companies and savings and credit associations with advice and further training.

Swisscontact's activities in financial services include:

- develop financial products services and products with local partners for small enterprises
- capacity building in financial skills
- develop new technologies and improve infrastructure
- improve the regulatory framework

Swisscontact especially promotes microleasing (leasing productive assets, e.g. agricultural tools, livestock).

=== Climate-smart economy ===
Swisscontact is working for an economically, socially and ecologically sustainable development and is considering the responsible use of natural resources a prerequisite to achieve this. The organisations believes that services related to climate protection and associated technologies represent a growth market and will in future be able to provide people with jobs and income in developing countries as well. An example of this is recycling of reusable materials.

Swisscontact lends its support by:

- Situational analyses
- Public relations work to increase environmental awareness
- Advising authorities on drafting laws and decrees
- Training instructors and professionals and strengthening the dialogue between different actors and civil society
- Transfer of technologies and processes

=== Senior Expert Corps ===
Since 1979 Swisscontact has a pool of retired professionals called the Senior Expert Corps. Its members are supporting SMEs in developing and transition countries in solving technical and operational problems on a voluntary basis. If necessary they provide further training to the personnel and management of the company. One assignment lasts a maximum of three months. The pool contains experts in: marketing and management consulting, electrical, civil and mechanical engineering, hotel and tourism services, food engineering, education, medical and health care services, agronomy and forestry engineering, construction and other specialized fields.
