= Wadhwani =

Wadhwani is a Sindhi surname.

Notable people with the surname include:

- Nirmala Wadhwani (born 1964), Indian politician
- Romesh Wadhwani (born 1946/47), Indian-American businessman
- Sunil Wadhwani (born 1952/1953), Indian-born American businessman and philanthropist
- Sushil Wadhwani (born 1959), British businessman

== See also ==
- Wadhwa
- Wadhawan
