= Anup Kumar =

Anup Kumar may refer to:

- Anoop Kumar (1926–1997), Indian film actor who appeared over seventy Bollywood films; brother of Ashok Kumar and Kishore Kumar
- Anup Kumar (Bengali actor) (1930–1998), Bengali film actor
- Anup Kumar (kabaddi) (born 1983), Indian Kabaddi player
- Anoop Kumar (Tamil actor), Tamil film actor
- Anup Kumar (politician), Fiji Indian politician
