= Chak Amru =

Chak Amru چک امرُو
- Town
- Location within Pakistan
- Coordinates: 32.373148°N 75.177158°E
- Country: Pakistan
- Province: Punjab
- Elevation: 271 m (889 ft)
- Time zone: UTC+5 (PST)

Chak Amru (Urdu: چک امرُو) is a town of Shakargarh tehsil in Narowal district of Punjab province, Pakistan. It is located near the Pakistan-India border. Named after a businessman, Lala Amarnath, the settlement developed during the British rule in India.

Chak Amru town has a railway Station called Chak Amru railway station.

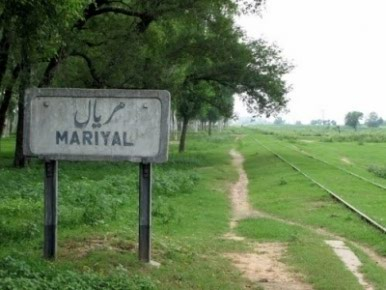
Chak Amru Railway Station Shakargarh
