= Inderpreet Wadhwa =

Indian-American entrepreneur

- Born: 1972
- Education: UC Berkeley
- Occupations: Former Chairman and CEO Azure Power Vice President, Products & Operations Loyalty Lab (now Tibco) Senior Director, Applications Development Oracle Corporation
- Known for: Pioneering Solar Power Generation in India Building India’s first private Utility Scale Solar Project Building India’s first distributed MW Scale Rooftop Solar Project Issuance of India’s first Solar Green Bond Listing of India’s first power company on NYSE

Inderpreet Singh Wadhwa (born 1972) is an Indian-American renewable energy entrepreneur. He is the former Chairman & CEO of Azure Power Global Limited. In 2008, he founded Azure Power, which launched an Initial Public Offering (IPO) on October 12, 2016, enabling the first listing of Indian energy assets on the New York Stock Exchange. He retired from CEO and Chairman positions of Azure Power in July, 2019 and served as an external advisor to Azure Power till December 31, 2019.

== Personal life and education ==
Wadhwa was born in Amritsar, Punjab. He has a Bachelors in Electronics Engineering from G.N.D.U, Punjab and graduated from Haas School of Business at UC Berkeley.

== Career ==
In 2008, Wadhwa founded Azure Power with the idea of setting up a business that offers viable and socially responsible alternatives to conventional sources of energy. At the age of 35, Wadhwa, left his job in Silicon Valley and decided to explore the solar energy sector. Wadhwa pioneered a 1 MW project in a border village in Punjab, which at the time was the largest commercial solar project in India. On December 1, 2009, Azure commissioned the first phase (1 MW) of its 2 MW solar PV plant in Awan, Amritsar and began to sell solar power to the Punjab State Electricity Board making Wadhwa the first entrepreneur to sell solar power commercially in India.

Prior to Azure Power, Wadhwa served as a vice president of Loyalty Lab and as a senior director of Oracle Corporation. Additionally, he has been a member of the Private Sector Advisory Group (PSAG) to the Green Climate Fund (GCF).

== Azure Power ==
Under Inderpreet’s leadership, Azure Power grew to become one of India's largest solar power developers and operators with a portfolio of over 3 GWs, including over 1.5 GWs of operating assets. The company has established its leadership through a series of industry firsts, including the first Indian solar company to list its shares publicly on the NYSE and the first successful issuance of green bonds for Indian solar assets.

In 2016, Azure Power received the National Award under category “Project Developer” by MNRE.

In 2018, Azure Power’s project portfolio surpassed the 3 GW milestone.

In March 2019, Azure Power surpassed 100 MWs of operating solar rooftop capacity, making the operating portfolio of Azure Roof Power one of the largest in the country.

In July 2019, Inderpreet retired from his position as CEO and Chairman and member of the Board of Directors of Azure Power and all its subsidiaries. He will continue to serve as an advisor to the Company until December 31, 2019.

== Media Appearances ==
Inderpreet has relentlessly lobbied generation based incentives in solar sector through Clean Trade initiatives across US and India. His work has been highlighted in publications such as Wall Street Journal, New York Times, Forbes, Fortune, and Economic Times and he is a sought after speaker at major solar power events in India and abroad including Solar Power International, Inter Solar and other leading solar conferences.

Some of the public appearances are as below:

- Inderpreet Wadhwa interview with OPIC
- Inderpreet Wadhwa in conversation with IFC about entrepreneurship in India’s solar power sector
- Inderpreet Wadhwa interview at IFC Climate Business Forum 2017
- Inderpreet Wadhwa in conversation David Letterman in Years of Living Dangerously by National Geographic
- Inderpreet Wadhwa in conversation with Barclays on access to financing
- Inderpreet Wadhwa in conversation with Bloomberg
- Inderpreet Wadha in at TEDexLeh on building sustainable infrastructure with inclusive growth
