= Sikh Pilgrimage to Pakistan =

1985 book by Anup Singh Choudry and Hardip Singh Chowdhary

- Author: Anup Singh Choudry and Hardip Singh Chowdhary
- Publication date: 1985

Sikh Pilgrimage to Pakistan is a book by Anup Singh Choudry and Hardip Singh Chowdhary, published by Gurbani Centre, UK, in 1985 and printed in Great Britain by Jarrold and Sons Ltd, Norwich.

== Content ==
The book is aimed at visitors to Sikh shrines in Pakistan. With the relaxation of the visa requirements for Indian citizens in 2005, increasing numbers of Sikh visitors are travelling to Pakistan. Guru Nanak, the founder of the Sikh religion was born on the outskirts of Lahore, and the book contains illustrations of various sacred places in Pakistan connected with the Guru from his birth to death. The events of the first Guru's life are now represented by sacred Gurdwaras, which are documented in this book.

Thousands of Sikhs visit Pakistan each year to celebrate the birth anniversary of their founder, Guru Nanak, at Nankana Sahib, his birthplace. This illustrated guide introduces most of the Sikh shrines in Pakistan connected with the founding Guru, to help prospective pilgrims who wish to visit these shrines.

The chapter on the Sikh Raj gives some background to the Sikhs' history and their present political status, referencing some recent events of historical importance and significance.
