= Anup Mathew Thomas =

Indian artist (born 1977)

Anup Mathew Thomas (born 1977) is a visual artist who lives and works in Bangalore. Thomas graduated from the Srishti School of Art, Design and Technology, Bangalore in 2003 and has stayed largely with photography as his medium of choice. Predominantly producing work in series, Thomas's photographs conceal an innate critique of their subject matter, engaging often with narratives that are seemingly and instinctively local but reverberate within a more inclusive context. Thomas’s works are often presented as digital slideshows as well as prints.

His recent solo exhibitions include Double Feature at Lothringer13, Munich, Hereinafter, GALLERYSKE, Bangalore, an exhibition at the Contemporary Image Collective, Cairo (2010), View from Conolly's Plot at GALLERYSKE, Bangalore (2010), Assembly, presented by GALLERYSKE at Kashi Art Gallery, Kochi (2008) and Metropolitan at Gasworks Gallery, London (2007).

In 2006, Thomas received the Charles Wallace India Trust scholarship to be an artist-in-residence at Gasworks in London. He was also a resident artist at the Vasl International artist residency in Lahore the same year. Anup Mathew Thomas's work was also part of the inaugural edition of the Kochi Muziris Biennale. 2012. He is a recipient of the 2014 The Abraaj Group Art Prize.

== Work ==
=== Passing By, 2002 ===
In 2002, Thomas’s first solo exhibition titled Passing By was shown at the Alliance Francaises in Thiruvananthapuram, Pondicherry, Chandigarh, Bangalore and New Delhi. The images in the exhibition were photographed over a period of two months in Western Europe in 1999.

=== Well, Basically This is About Thomas Jacob, 2003 ===
In 2003, Thomas took a series of photographs of his father culminating in a show titled Well, Basically This is About Thomas Jacob. The work chronicled nine months in Thomas's father's life who he followed and documented in Kerala, Tamil Nadu and the UK. The 500 black and white images are projected on two screens facing one another. These vignettes of his father's life formed brief narratives in various clusters.

=== Light Life, 2005 ===
In 2005, during the Khoj international artists' workshop in Mumbai, India, Thomas developed Light Life – a photo installation on the dance bars of Mumbai. Thomas shot interiors of Mumbai dance bars on the eve of the bars' closure by local authorities on the grounds of moral inappropriateness. The subject is treated formally and the series depicts empty interiors of these nightclubs where modestly dressed women dance for men in exchange for cash. The work was presented as a digital slideshow with slowly changing stills of these evocative venues that though devoid of human presence seemed alive with movement. Light Life questions the diktat to shut these bars; many ex-dancers were obliged to seek the very employment the censure sought to discourage. The work encourages reflection on the politics of moral censure even as it explores unused spaces that are present within our larger urban experience.

=== NCA Library, 2006 ===
In NCA Library, Thomas presents a sequence of projected photographs sampled from the closed circuit cameras monitoring the National College of Arts library in Lahore, Pakistan where the artist is recorded on security cameras, placing thirteen of his catalogues in the library after closing hours inscribed individually for artists who were teaching at the NCA. In the course of the next few weeks, most of the catalogues disappeared from the library. There are sixteen cameras installed in the NCA library to prevent acts of theft/vandalism.

=== New Friends, 2006 ===
In Lahore, Thomas asked some artists he met there to pose for him for what became the series, New Friends. New Friends unfolds as a sequence of portraits of people Thomas met for the first time. In the images, the 'sitter' often determined the manner in which he or she was presented – making choices about the settings, interiors, and poses adopted. He carried the series on during a second residency in London at Gasworks (New Friends, London). Key to the photo-shoots was that the scenes were not directed by the artist, but were documentations by him of each artist's idea of portraiture or their performance for the photograph thereby exploring the contours of "self-representation".

=== Metropolitan, 2006 ===
In 2006, Thomas documented bishops from different denominations of Christianity in Kerala. The work, titled Metropolitan comprised a series of fourteen large format photographs of Episcopalian bishops. The portraits are staged using a common visual strategy – posing in their vestments before their official residences. Thomas singled out the heads of the Episcopal churches, the bishops who have spiritual and administrative powers over their respective dioceses. Born and raised in a family belonging to one of the denominations represented in the series, Thomas's enquiry into the plural practice of modern-day Christianity unveils the hierarchies within these denominations. The variety of style and colour within their ceremonial regalia expresses the sheer diversity within the denominations, drawing awareness to the remarkably plural social characteristics in this coastal state. By viewing all the Bishops from the same distance, he brings into striking view two telling differences in their status – their vestments and their official residences, revealing grandeur and simplicity. The style of the mostly palatial houses, ranging from the colonial to the traditional to the contemporary vernacular, signal the degrees of prosperity of the denominations in question as do the nature of the vestments and the preciousness of the cross and crook held by some of the bishops. In the work, he also engages with issues of power and authority vested in them on behalf of the denominations they preside over.

=== Cabinet, 2007 ===
Thomas' longstanding interest in the intersection of portraiture and power led to his next work, Cabinet in 2007, a slide show of nineteen head and shoulder portraits of cabinet ministers from Kerala's then ruling Left Democratic Front government.

=== Assembly, 2008 ===
In 2008, Thomas's work Assembly was exhibited at Kashi gallery in Kochi. The show worked as an installation with red plastic chairs placed as though for an official function facing a screen on which were projected a series of photographs, each one of a mundane Kerala street scene framed by a temporary arch of the type typically constructed in the state to announce a social, religious, political or commercial function. The transition between the images was done using a common digital transitional device whereby the image collapsed in a centripetal swirl and re-emerged similarly. The twirl becomes a key to the work, directing and intervening on the rhythms of the viewers' gaze.

=== View from Conolly's Plot, 2010 ===
As part of an ongoing exploration of the socio-political and cultural milieu of his home-state Kerala, Thomas' collection of photographs was in a show titled, View from Conolly's Plot at GALLERYSKE Bangalore in 2010. The series of nine images, taken over three years, depict events, structures and people and were a satirical and poignant exploration of the subtle and uncanny changes dispersed upon his native Kerala.

Contained in his photographs are references to Kerala's attempts to create a bridge between its past and its present, starting from the legacy of Henry Valentine Conolly, the collector of British Malabar, who set up the world's first teak plantation in Kerala in the 1840s. Ambassadors, photographed in 2007, is ostensibly a portrait of Vellapally Natesan, the General Secretary of a local social organisation dedicated to upholding the teachings of anti-caste social reformer Shree Narayana Guru. In the photograph, the artist places the leader and his wax statue imaging him side by side so that it is almost impossible to distinguish who is made of flesh and what is formed of wax. Also exhibited in the same show was his work, Happy Moments, a slide show presenting images of the backdrops used in a Bible-based quiz show on a Christian entertainment channel.

=== Hereinafter, 2012 ===
In Hereinafter, Thomas explores the recurring themes of death, memory, the preservation of memory and mortality. This examination as with most work in Thomas’s practice centres on the cultural history of Kerala.

“Ithikkara Bridge", an image of a plaque that serves as a memorial stone emphasises a transition from life to death as well as elaborates the idea of passage The plaque reads "Ithikkara Bridge, opened for traffic on 20-1-1976, with the passage of the cortege of TK Divakaran, Honourable Minister of Works, Kerala state, who expired on 19-1-1976." In "KS Biologicals", Thomas documents the personal collection of K Shikamoni, a biology teacher in Thalachanvilai, Kanyakumari district. The image presents skeletons and jarred specimens in a private biology museum. The collection is enhanced with instants of the personal encroaching on the scientific with inclusions such as the remains of Shikamoni’s pet dog. “Staging at Nedumbarakkadu” is a photograph of a photograph of a man’s pre-staged lying in coffin. The work approaches the unwitting act of performance art- with an open casket, and wife and father-in-law in attendance. In “Preparations for Karthikeyan’s Post Mortem” a fallen elephant Karthikeyan is shown among a mass of gathering public. A note that accompanies the work tells of his demise following a road accident, his extraction from the vehicle, the efforts of doctors and locals to revive him and his death 14 hours after the accident.
