= Anup Nathu =

New Zealand cricketer (born 1960)

Personal information
- Born: 8 October 1960 (age 66); Wellington, New Zealand
- Source: Cricinfo, 17 October 2020

Anup Nathu (born 8 October 1960) is a New Zealand cricketer. He played in 29 first-class and 16 List A matches for Canterbury and Wellington from 1980 to 1992.
