= Jassar, Pakistan =

Jassar جسڑ
- Town
- Location within Pakistan
- Coordinates: 32°06′N 74°57′E
- Country: Pakistan
- Province: Punjab
- District: Narowal
- Tehsil: Narowal
- Elevation: 233 m (764 ft)
- Time zone: UTC+5 (PST)
- Number of Union councils: 2

Jassar (Punjabi: جسڑ) is a town in Narowal District of Punjab province of Pakistan. Jassar is also a sub-caste of the Jatt clan in Punjab.

== Geography ==
The town is located at 32°6'0N 74°57'0E 5 kilometres (3.1 mi) East of Narowal while travelling towards Tehsil Shakargarh with an altitude of 233 metres (764 ft).
