= Indian Physical Society =

- Abbreviation: IPS
- Formation: 29 June 1934; 92 years ago
- Type: Scientific
- Headquarters: Jadavpur, Kolkata
- Location: India
- Website: iacs.res.in/indian-physical-society.html

The Indian Physical Society is a professional society of physicists in India. It was formally established in 1934 by pioneering Indian physicist Meghnad Saha. The society's stated objectives are to promote the progress and uphold the cause of both pure and applied physics in India, to encourage publications in physics and related areas, to publish books, journals, proceedings etc., to organize conferences, advise government bodies, and to secure and administer funds, grants and endowments for the furtherance of scientific research.

Its headquarters are at the Indian Association for the Cultivation of Science in Kolkata, India.
