= Anup Singh Choudry =

Ugandan lawyer and judge

The Hon. Mr. Justice (Retired) Anup Singh Choudry
- Retired Justice Anup Singh Choudry in 2015

Retired Judge of the High Court of Uganda
- In office 2008–2014

Personal details
- Born: Justice Anup Singh Choudry; 13 August 1949 (age 77) Masaka, Uganda
- Spouse: Ravinder Kaur (1984–present)
- Children: Satbir; Kuljeet; Judge-Maan
- Education: St. Joseph's College Layibi; University of London; Corpus Christi College, Cambridge; College of Law Chester; College of Law Guilford
- Website: gurbanicentre.com

Anup Singh Choudry (born 13 August 1949), is a Ugandan lawyer, justice and writer who served as a justice of the High Court of Uganda from 2 May 2008 until 11 August 2014.

He was sworn in at a ceremony at the State House in Entebbe before President Yoweri Museveni and Chief Justice Benjamin Odoki. He is the first Sikh and Ugandan-born Asian to be appointed to the bench in that country.

== Background and education ==
Anup Singh was born on 13 August 1949 to Tarlok Singh and Narinder Kaur in Masaka, Uganda. His grandfather Hari Singh, originally from Rawalpindi, Punjab Province, British India, migrated to Uganda in the early 1900s and served in the then Crown Colony's civil service system. Singh's father too, served in Uganda's Civil Service which he retired from in 1972.

Singh attended Shimoni Demonstration Primary School and did his secondary school education in both Nyamitanga Secondary School in Mbarara as well as St. Joseph's College Layibi, in Gulu. After his education in Uganda, he attended Kings College at the University of London, Corpus Christi College, Cambridge, College of Law Chester and College of Law Guilford.

== Career ==
Singh practiced law in the United Kingdom as a solicitor, for 20 years, from 1980 until 2000. He also ran several businesses in the United Kingdom, including a Nissan car dealership, and two property and investment companies.

In 2008, the Uganda Judicial Services Commission recommended him to the president of Uganda for nomination as a Justice of the High Court of Uganda. He was nominated and duly approved by the Ugandan Parliament. He was sworn in on 2 May 2008.

After 6 years of service, Justice Choudry retired on 11 August 2011 and returned to the United Kingdom to join his family.

== Personal life ==
Justice Choudry is married and has 3 children.

== Publications ==
He has written several books about Sikhism, notably:

- Sikh Pilgrimage to Pakistan
- Sikh Genocide 1984 (editor)
- Flight to Freedom
- Lawyers Office Directory A-Z. Editor: Anup Singh Choudry, the first A-Z legal directory in the UK (1989) ISBN 0-9513894-0-8
- Human Rights of Women in Sikhism
