= Anup Wadhawan =

Commerce Secretary for the Government of India

Anup Wadhawan (born 1961) is former Commerce Secretary for the Government of India who retired in June 2021.

An IAS officer of the 1985 batch of the Uttarakhand cadre, Wadhawan received a bachelor's degree from University of Delhi and followed it up with a postgraduate degree from Delhi School of Economics. He earned a PhD from Duke University. Wadhawan has served both central in various roles at Department of Commerce, Directorate General of Foreign Trade, Department of Financial Services, Department of Economic Affairs, and the Prime Minister's Office.
