= Central Electronics Engineering Research Institute =

Indian research institute

Coordinates: 28.3670°N 75.5841°E

CSIR-Central Electronics Engineering Research Institute
- Type: Research institution
- Established: 1953; 73 years ago
- Affiliations: CSIR; AcSIR
- Chairman: Prime Minister of India
- Director: Dr. P. C. Panchariya
- Location: Pilani-333031, Rajasthan, India
- Campus: Rural
- Website: www.ceeri.res.in

Central Electronics Engineering Research Institute (CEERI), located at Pilani, Rajasthan, is a research institute in India and a constituent laboratory of the Council of Scientific and Industrial Research (CSIR). It was established in 1953, for advanced research and development in the field of electronics.

Since its inception, it has been working for the growth of electronics in the country and has established the required infrastructure and well-experienced manpower for undertaking research and development in the following major areas :

1. Cyber-physical systems
2. Microwave tubes
3. Smart sensors

The center focuses on process control instrumentation, automation, and machine vision technologies.
