= Chak Amru railway station =

Railway station in Punjab, Pakistan

Chak Amru Railway Station چک امرُو ریلوے اسٹیشن

General information
- Coordinates: 32.3728°N 75.1783°E
- Owner: Ministry of Railways
- Line: Shahdara Bagh–Chak Amru Branch Line

Other information
- Station code: CKRU

Services
Preceding station	Pakistan Railways	Following station
Mariyal towards Shahdara Bagh Junction	Shahdara Bagh–Chak Amru Branch Line	Terminus
Location

Chak Amru Railway Station (Urdu: چک امرُو ریلوے اسٹیشن, Punjabi: چک امرُو ریلوے اسٹیشن) is a northern terminus serving Chak Amru town, Narowal district, Punjab, Pakistan.

It is Pakistan's most easterly active station, though not currently functional.

== See also ==
- List of railway stations in Pakistan
- Pakistan Railways
