= Shahdara Bagh Junction railway station =

Railway station in Pakistan

Shahdara Bagh Junction Station شاہدرہ باغ جنکشن ریلوے اسٹیشن
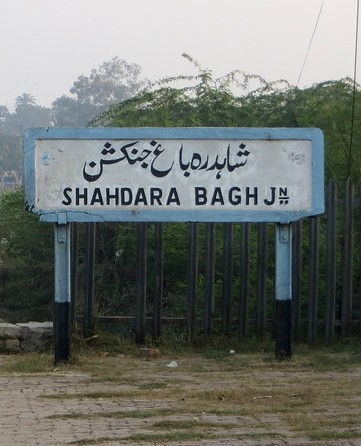

General information
- Coordinates: 31.6271°N 74.2905°E
- Owner: Ministry of Railways
- Lines: Karachi–Peshawar Railway Line; Shahdara Bagh–Sangla Hill Branch Line; Shahdara Bagh–Chak Amru Branch Line

Other information
- Station code: SDR

History
- Opened: 1910

Services
Preceding station	Pakistan Railways	Following station
Badami Bagh towards Kiamari	Karachi–Peshawar Line	Kala Shah Kaku towards Peshawar Cantonment
Terminus	Shahdara Bagh–Chak Amru Branch Line	Kot Mul Chand towards Chak Amru
Terminus	Shahdara Bagh–Sangla Hill Branch Line	Missan Kalar towards Sangla Hill Junction
Location

Shahdara Bagh Junction Railway Station (Urdu and Punjabi: شاہدرہ باغ جنکشن ریلوے اسٹیشن) is located in Shahdara Bagh, in Lahore District of Pakistan's Punjab province.

== See also ==
- List of railway stations in Pakistan
- Pakistan Railways
